= List of Perth Glory FC end-of-season awards =

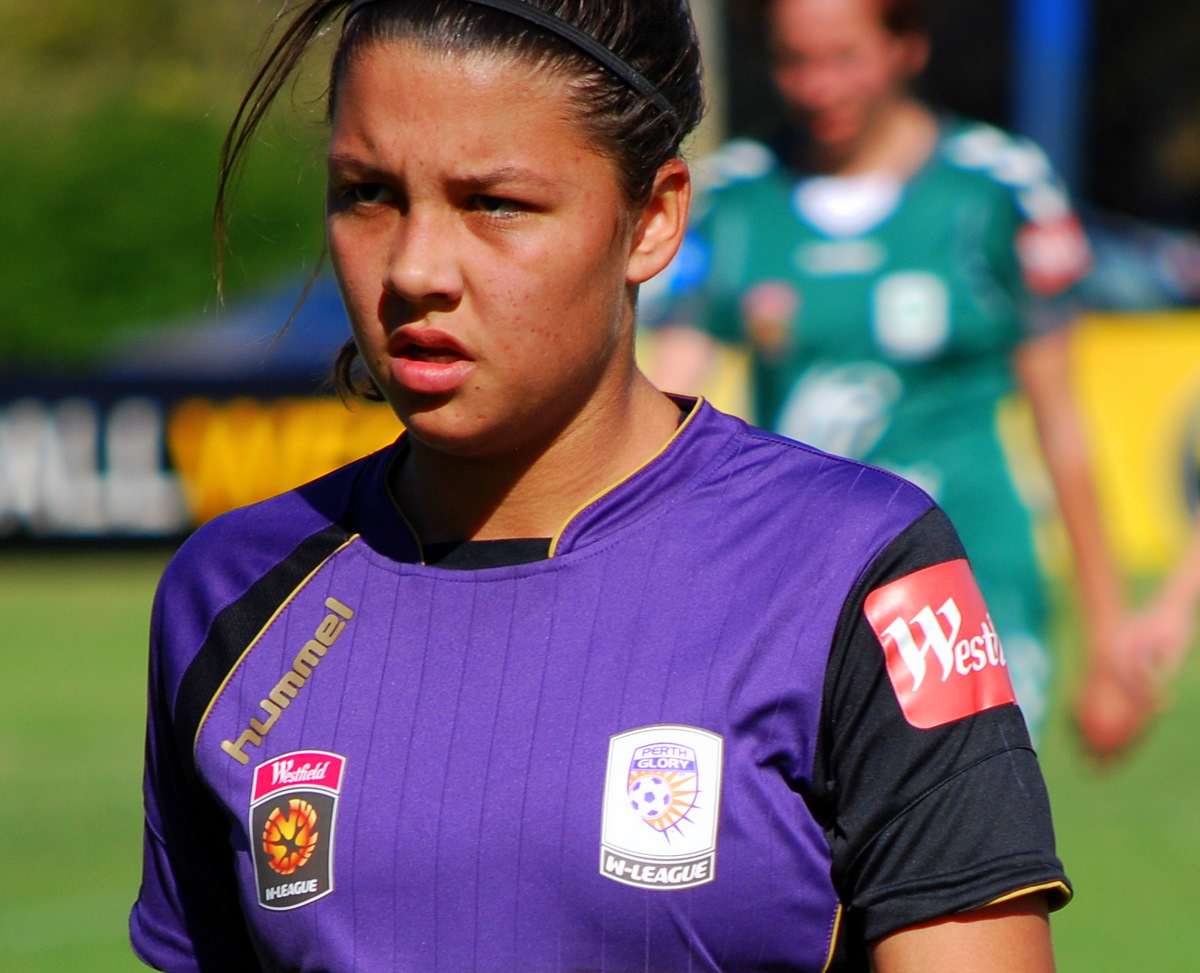
Sam Kerr won multiple awards when she played for Perth, including four Most Glorious Player Awards

The Perth Glory end-of-season awards are the individual awards won by players of Perth Glory Football Club, an Australian soccer club based in Perth, Western Australia. The club's teams compete in the A-League Men, A-League Women and A-League Youth. These awards are presented annually at the club's presentation night following the completion of the A-League Men season.

== Men's ==
=== Most Glorious Player ===
Year	Player
1996–97	(New Zealand) Gavin Wilkinson
1997–98	(New Zealand) Danny Hay
1998–99	(New Zealand) Danny Hay (Australia) Scott Miller
1999–2000	(Australia) Gareth Naven
2000–01	(Australia) Bobby Despotovski
2001–02	(Australia) Bobby Despotovski
2002–03	(Australia) Scott Miller
2003–04	(Australia) Bobby Despotovski
2005–06	(Australia) Bobby Despotovski
2006–07	(Australia) Simon Colosimo (Australia) David Tarka
2007–08	(Australia) Nikolai Topor-Stanley
2008–09	(Australia) Adriano Pellegrino
2009–10	(England) Andy Todd
2010–11	(Australia) Jacob Burns
2011–12	(Australia) Josh Risdon
2012–13	(Scotland) Steven McGarry
2013–14	(Australia) Michael Thwaite
2014–15	(Australia) Dino Djulbic
2015–16	(Spain) Diego Castro
2016–17	(Spain) Diego Castro
2017–18	(Australia) Shane Lowry
2018–19	(Spain) Diego Castro
2019–20	(Uruguay) Bruno Fornaroli (Australia) Neil Kilkenny
2020–21	(Uruguay) Bruno Fornaroli
2021–22	(Curaçao) Darryl Lachman
2022–23	(England) Mark Beevers
2023–24	(Australia) Adam Taggart
2024–25	(Australia) Adam Taggart
2025–26	(Vanuatu) Brian Kaltak

=== Players' Player of the Year ===
Year	Player
2006–07	(Australia) David Tarka
2008–09	(Australia) Nikita Rukavytsya
2009–10	(England) Andy Todd
2010–11	(Australia) Scott Neville
2011–12	(Australia) Josh Risdon
2012–13	(Scotland) Steven McGarry
2013–14	(Australia) Danny Vukovic
2015–16	(Spain) Diego Castro
2016–17	(Spain) Diego Castro
2017–18	(Australia) Shane Lowry
2018–19	(Spain) Juande
2019–20	(Spain) Juande
2020–21	(Uruguay) Bruno Fornaroli
2021–22	(Curaçao) Darryl Lachman
2022–23	(England) Mark Beevers
2023–24	(Australia) Adam Taggart
2024–25	(Australia) Nicholas Pennington
2025–26	(Vanuatu) Brian Kaltak

=== Young Player of the Year ===
Year	Player
2006–07	(Australia) David Tarka
2008–09	(Australia) Tando Velaphi
2013–14	(Australia) Chris Harold
2015–16	(Australia) Josh Risdon
2020–21	(Australia) Luke Bodnar
2021–22	(Australia) Giordano Colli
2022–23	(Australia) Keegan Jelacic
2023–24	(Australia) Daniel Bennie
2024–25	(Australia) Jaylan Pearman
2025–26	(Australia) Giovanni de Abreu

=== Best Clubman ===
Year	Player
2008–09	(Australia) Jamie Harnwell
2009–10	(Australia) Naum Sekulovski
2010–11	(Australia) Scott Neville
2012–13	(Australia) Travis Dodd
2013–14	(Australia) Travis Dodd
2015–16	(Australia) Josh Risdon
2016–17	(Australia) Richard Garcia
2017–18	(Australia) Shane Lowry

=== Bobby Despotovski Golden Boot ===
Year	Player	Goals
2006–07	(Australia) Jamie Harnwell	7
2008–09	(Ivory Coast) Eugène Dadi (Australia) Nikita Rukavytsya	10
2009–10	(Australia) Mile Sterjovski	6
2010–11	(England) Robbie Fowler	9
2011–12	(New Zealand) Shane Smeltz	17
2012–13	(New Zealand) Shane Smeltz	7
2013–14	(Scotland) Steven McGarry (New Zealand) Shane Smeltz	4
2014–15	(Republic of Ireland) Andy Keogh	12
2015–16	(Spain) Diego Castro	13
2016–17	(Spain) Diego Castro (Australia) Adam Taggart (Republic of Ireland) Andy Keogh	12
2017–18	(Australia) Adam Taggart	9
2018–19	(Republic of Ireland) Andy Keogh	15
2019–20	(Uruguay) Bruno Fornaroli	13
2020–21	(Uruguay) Bruno Fornaroli	13
2021–22	(Uruguay) Bruno Fornaroli	8
2022–23	(Australia) Adam Taggart (Australia) David Williams	5
2023–24	(Australia) Adam Taggart	20
2024–25	(Australia) Adam Taggart	10
2025–26	(Wales) Tom Lawrence (Australia) Nicholas Pennington (Australia) Adam Taggart	5

=== Goal of the Year ===
Year	Player
2012–13	(Scotland) Steven McGarry
2013–14	(Brazil) Sidnei Sciola
2015–16	(Australia) Mitchell Oxborrow
2016–17	(Serbia) Nebojša Marinković
2017–18	(Australia) Adam Taggart
2018–19	(Australia) Neil Kilkenny
2019–20	(Australia) James Meredith
2020–21	(Republic of Ireland) Andy Keogh
2021–22	(Australia) Antonee Burke-Gilroy
2022–23	(Australia) Adam Taggart
2023–24	(North Macedonia) Stefan Colakovski
2024–25	(England) Luke Amos
2025–26	(Australia) Jaiden Kucharski

=== Supporters' / Members' Players of the Year ===
Year	Player
2008–09	(Ivory Coast) Eugène Dadi
2009–10	(England) Andy Todd
2010–11	(Australia) Scott Neville
2011–12	(Republic of Ireland) Liam Miller
2012–13	(Australia) Josh Risdon
2013–14	(Australia) Danny Vukovic
2018–19	(Australia) Neil Kilkenny
2020–21	(Spain) Diego Castro
2021–22	(Curaçao) Darryl Lachman
2022–23	(Australia) Ryan Williams
2023–24	(Australia) Adam Taggart
2024–25	(Australia) Adam Taggart
2025–26	(Vanuatu) Brian Kaltak

=== Volunteers' Player of the Year ===
Year	Player
2008–09	(Australia) Adriano Pellegrino
2009–10	(England) Andy Todd
2010–11	(Australia) Adriano Pellegrino
2012–13	(Republic of Ireland) Liam Miller
2013–14	(Australia) Michael Thwaite
2015–16	(Spain) Diego Castro
2016–17	(Spain) Diego Castro
2017–18	(Spain) Diego Castro

== Men's Youth ==
=== Naven's Most Glorious Youth players ===
Year	Player
2008–09	(Australia) Scott Neville
2009–10	(Australia) Dean Evans
2012–13	(Australia) Riley Woodcock
2013–14	(Australia) Jacob Collard
2014–15	(Australia) Jacob Collard
2015–16	(Australia) Jordan Thurtell
2016–17	(Australia) Joe Knowles
2018–19	(Australia) Henry Hore
2019–20	(Australia) Alessandro Circati

== Women's ==
=== Most Glorious Player ===
Year	Player
2008–09	(Australia) Tanya Oxtoby
2009	(Australia) Shannon May
2010–11	(Sweden) Alexandra Nilsson
2011–12	(Australia) Tanya Oxtoby
2012–13	(Australia) Aivi Luik
2013–14	(Australia) Collette McCallum
2014	(Australia) Sam Kerr
2015–16	(United States) Vanessa DiBernardo
2016–17	(Australia) Sam Kerr
2017–18	(Australia) Sam Kerr
2018–19	(Australia) Sam Kerr
2019–20	(Spain) Celia
2020–21	(New Zealand) Elizabeth Anton
2021–22	(Denmark) Mie Leth Jans
2022–23	(United States) Cyera Hintzen
2023–24	(Australia) Hana Lowry
2024–25	(Australia) Isobel Dalton
2025–26	(Australia) Tijan McKenna

=== Players' Player of the Year ===
Year	Player
2009	(United States) Alex Singer
2010–11	(Sweden) Alexandra Nilsson
2011–12	(England) Katie Holtham
2014	(Australia) Sam Kerr
2018–19	(Australia) Sam Kerr
2019–20	(United States) Morgan Andrews
2020–21	(New Zealand) Lily Alfeld
2021–22	(Australia) Natasha Rigby
2022–23	(United States) Cyera Hintzen
2023–24	(Australia) Morgan Aquino
2024–25	(Australia) Tijan McKenna
2025–26	(Australia) Teresa Morrissey

=== Golden Boot ===
Year	Player	Goals
2009	(Australia) Kate Gill	3
2010–11	(Australia) Kate Gill (Australia) Sam Kerr	3
2011–12	(Australia) Marianna Tabain	3
2012–13	(Australia) Kate Gill	11
2013–14	(Australia) Kate Gill	6
2014	(Australia) Kate Gill	12
2015–16	(United States) Vanessa DiBernardo	6
2016–17	(Australia) Sam Kerr	10
2017–18	(Australia) Sam Kerr	13
2018–19	(Australia) Sam Kerr	13
2019–20	(United States) Morgan Andrews	7
2020–21	(Australia) Caitlin Doeglas (Australia) Hana Lowry	2
2021–22	(United States) Cyera Hintzen	5
2022–23	(United States) Cyera Hintzen	6
2023–24	(England) Millie Farrow	7
2024–25	(New Zealand) Kelli Brown	5
2025–26	(United States) Rola Badawiya	5
