= 2012–13 Perth Glory FC (women) season =

Perth Glory (W-League)
2012–13 season
- Chairman: Tony Sage
- Head Coach: Jamie Harnwell
- W-League: 2nd
- W-League Finals: Semi-finals
- Top goalscorer: League: Kate Gill (11); All: Kate Gill (11)
- Highest home attendance: 1,589 vs. Melbourne Victory (20 January 2013); W-League Finals
- Lowest home attendance: 736 vs. Newcastle Jets (5 January 2013); W-League
- Biggest win: 6–1 vs. Newcastle Jets (A) (10 November 2012); W-League
- Biggest defeat: 0–2 vs. Western Sydney Wanderers (A) (3 November 2012); W-League
Home colours	Away colours

The 2012–13 season was Perth Glory Football Club's fifth season, in the W-League. Perth Glory finished 2nd in their W-League season, finishing in the semi-finals.

== Players ==
Note: Flags indicate national team as defined under FIFA eligibility rules; some limited exceptions apply. Players may hold more than one non-FIFA nationality.

No.	Pos.	Nation	Player
1	GK	ENG	Carly Telford
2	DF	AUS	Sarah Carroll
3	DF	WAL	Carys Hawkins
4	DF	AUS	Bronwyn Studman
5	MF	AUS	Shannon May
6	DF	CAN	Sasha Andrews
7	MF	AUS	Aivi Luik
8	MF	AUS	Ella Mastrantonio
9	FW	AUS	Rosie Sutton
10	MF	AUS	Jaymee Gibbons
11	FW	AUS	Lisa De Vanna

No.	Pos.	Nation	Player
12	FW	AUS	Kate Gill
13	MF	AUS	Elisa D'Ovidio
14	MF	AUS	Collette McCallum
15	DF	NZL	Elizabeth Milne
16	DF	AUS	Thia Eastman
17	FW	AUS	Marianna Tabain
18	MF	AUS	Kirri Bolton
19	DF	ENG	Shawn Billam
20	GK	AUS	Zoe Palandri
26	GK	USA	Kaitlyn Savage

== Transfers ==
=== Transfers in ===
No.	Position	Name	From	Type/fee	Date	Ref.
1	GK	(England) Carly Telford	(England) Chelsea	Free transfer	4 October 2012	
4	DF	Bronwyn Studman	Free agent	Free transfer	4 October 2012	
6	DF	(Canada) Sasha Andrews	Free agent	Free transfer	4 October 2012	
7	MF	Aivi Luik	Brisbane Roar	Free transfer	4 October 2012	
9	FW	Rosie Sutton	Free agent	Free transfer	4 October 2012	
12	FW	Kate Gill	Free agent	Free transfer	4 October 2012	
14	MF	Collette McCallum	(England) Lincoln Ladies	Free transfer	4 October 2012	
15	DF	(New Zealand) Elizabeth Milne	(New Zealand) Glenfield Rovers	Free transfer	4 October 2012	
16	DF	Thia Eastman	Free agent	Free transfer	4 October 2012	
18	MF	Kirri Bolton	Free agent	Free transfer	4 October 2012	
20	GK	Zoe Palandri	Free agent	Free transfer	4 October 2012	
30	GK	(Denmark) Maja Blasch	Free agent	Free transfer	20 December 2012	
26	GK	(United States) Kaitlyn Savage	(United States) FIU Panthers	Free transfer	4 January 2013	

=== Transfers out ===
No.	Position	Name	To	Type/fee	Date	Ref.
8	DF	Tanya Oxtoby	(England) Doncaster Rovers Belles	Free transfer	25 February 2012	
4	FW	Sam Kerr	Sydney FC	Free transfer	6 July 2012	
1	GK	Mackenzie Arnold	Canberra United	Free transfer	15 August 2012	
4	DF	Erika Elze	Brisbane Roar	Free transfer	17 October 2012	
6	FW	(Croatia) Katarina Jukic	Free agent	Free transfer	19 October 2012	
7	DF	Sadie Lawrence	Free agent	Free transfer	19 October 2012	
9	MF	(England) Katie Holtham	(England) Doncaster Rovers Belles	Free transfer	19 October 2012	
12	FW	Dani Calautti	Free agent	Free transfer	19 October 2012	
14	DF	Emily Dunn	Free agent	Free transfer	19 October 2012	
15	FW	Lara Filocamo	Free agent	Free transfer	19 October 2012	
20	GK	Kristy Teschinsky	Free agent	Free transfer	19 October 2012	
30	GK	(Denmark) Maja Blasch	Free agent	Free transfer	4 January 2013	

== Competitions ==
=== Overall record ===
Competition	First match	Last match	Starting round	Final position	Record							
Competition	First match	Last match	Starting round	Final position	Pld	W	D	L	GF	GA	GD	Win %
W-League	21 October 2012	12 January 2013	Matchday 1	2nd	12	7	3	2	34	20	+14	58.33
W-League Finals	20 January 2013		Semi-finals	Semi-finals	1	0	1	0	1	1	+0	0.00
Total					13	7	4	2	35	21	+14	53.85

Source: Competitions

=== W-League ===
==== League table ====
Pos	Team	Pld	W	D	L	GF	GA	GD	Pts	Qualification
1	Brisbane Roar	12	8	2	2	28	15	+13	26	Qualification to Finals series
2	Perth Glory	12	7	3	2	34	20	+14	24	Qualification to Finals series
3	Melbourne Victory	12	7	2	3	26	14	+12	23	Qualification to Finals series
4	Sydney FC (C)	12	6	2	4	30	24	+6	20	Qualification to Finals series
5	Canberra United	12	5	3	4	25	20	+5	18	
6	Western Sydney Wanderers	12	4	1	7	19	23	−4	13	
7	Newcastle Jets	12	1	3	8	15	33	−18	6	
8	Adelaide United	12	2	0	10	12	40	−28	6	

Source: au.soccerway.com
Rules for classification: 1) points; 2) goal difference; 3) number of goals scored.
(C) Champions

==== Results summary ====
Overall								Home						Away					
Pld	W	D	L	GF	GA	GD	Pts	W	D	L	GF	GA	GD	W	D	L	GF	GA	GD
12	7	3	2	34	20	+14	24	4	2	0	15	7	+8	3	1	2	19	13	+6

Source: worldfootball.net

==== Results by round ====
Round	1	2	3	4	5	7	6	8	9	10	11	12
Ground	H	H	A	A	H	H	A	A	A	H	H	A
Result	W	W	L	W	W	W	L	D	W	D	D	W
Position	1	1	3	1	1	1	1	1	1	1	3	2
Points	3	6	6	9	12	15	15	16	19	20	21	24

Source: worldfootball.net
A = Away; H = Home; W = Win; D = Draw; L = Loss

==== Matches ====
The league fixtures were announced on 18 September 2012.

Win Draw Loss

21 October 2012 1	Perth Glory	2–0	Melbourne Victory	Perth
10:30 AWST	Gill 75'; Tabain 88'	Report		Stadium: Initga Stadium; Referee: Kirralee Andruschak

27 October 2012 2	Perth Glory	2–1	Adelaide United	Perth
15:00 AWST	Gill 45'; D'Ovidio 88'	Report	Mayo 41'	Stadium: Intiga Stadium; Referee: Renee Silvester

3 November 2012 3	Western Sydney Wanderers	2–0	Perth Glory	Sydney
14:00 AEDT	Camilleri 43', 61'	Report		Stadium: Campbelltown Stadium; Referee: Alison Logue

10 November 2012 4	Newcastle Jets	1–6	Perth Glory	Newcastle
16:30 AEDT	Huster 72'	Report	De Vanna 5'; McCallum 21'; Gill 58', 62', 90+3'; Tabain 68'	Stadium: Wanderers Oval; Referee: Peta McCallum

17 November 2012 5	Perth Glory	3–1	Sydney FC	Perth
11:00 AWST	Sutton 18', 76', 85'	Report	Logarzo 19'	Stadium: nib Stadium; Attendance: 1,327; Referee: Rebecca Durcau

1 December 2012 7	Perth Glory	3–0	Western Sydney Wanderers	Perth
16:00 AWST	Tabain 17'; Gill 25'; McCallum 59'	Report		Stadium: Intiga Stadium; Referee: Renee Silvester

5 December 2012 6	Canberra United	2–1	Perth Glory	Canberra
18:00 AEDT	Munoz 5' (pen.); Washington 53'	Report	Sutton 9'	Stadium: Deakin Stadium; Attendance: 623; Referee: Peta McCallum
Note: Match originally scheduled for 24 November 2012, this match was postponed due to Canberra United's participation in the 2012 International Women's Club Championship. It was rescheduled for 5 December 2012.

8 December 2012 8	Brisbane Roar	2–2	Perth Glory	Brisbane
10:00 AEST	Butt 61'; Gorry 87'	Report	Gill 34'; Tabain 44'	Stadium: Queensland Sport and Athletics Centre; Referee: Kirralee Gardner

15 December 2012 9	Sydney FC	5–7	Perth Glory	Sydney
17:00 AEDT	Simon 41'; Kete 43'; Billson 62'; Foord 81'; Kerr 90'	Report	De Vanna 13', 72', 87'; Luik 56'; D'Ovidio 60', 61'; Gill 87'	Stadium: Allianz Stadium; Referee: Kirralee Gardner

22 December 2012 10	Perth Glory	3–3	Canberra United	Perth
16:00 AWST	Luik 34'; Milne 35'; D'Ovidio 49'	Report	Washington 24'; Raso 44'; Cooper 70'	Stadium: Initga Stadium; Referee: Kate Jacewicz

5 January 2013 11	Perth Glory	2–2	Newcastle Jets	Perth
16:00 AEDT	Sutton 22'; Gill 56'	Report	van Egmond 3'; Courtenay 77'	Stadium: Intiga Stadium; Attendance: 736; Referee: Catherine Hoffman

12 January 2013 12	Adelaide United	1–3	Perth Glory	Adelaide
14:00 ACDT	Quigley 52'	Report	Gill 18', 65'; Tabain 86'	Stadium: Burton Park; Referee: Kelly Jones

==== Finals series ====
20 January 2013 Semi-finals	Perth Glory	1–1 (a.e.t.) (3–4 p)	Melbourne Victory	Perth
13:00 AWST	McCallum 56'	Report	Spiranovic 51'	Stadium: nib Stadium; Attendance: 1,589; Referee: Katie Patterson
	Penalties
	McCallum (penalty scored); Gill (penalty scored); Luik (penalty missed); R. Sutton (penalty missed); De Vanna (penalty scored)		(penalty scored) Johnson; (penalty missed) Friend; (penalty scored) P. Larsson; (penalty scored) Koca; (penalty scored) McDonald

== Statistics ==
=== Appearances and goals ===
Includes all competitions. Players with no appearances not included in the list.

No.	Pos.	Nat.	Name	W-League				Total	
No.	Pos.	Nat.	Name	Regular season		Finals series		Total	
No.	Pos.	Nat.	Name	Apps	Goals	Apps	Goals	Apps	Goals
1	GK	(England)	Carly Telford	9	0	0	0	9	0
2	DF	(Australia)	Sarah Carroll	6+2	0	0	0	8	0
3	DF	(Wales)	Carys Hawkins	11	0	1	0	12	0
4	DF	(Australia)	Bronwyn Studman	11	0	1	0	12	0
5	MF	(Australia)	Shannon May	4+6	0	0+1	0	11	0
6	DF	(Canada)	Sasha Andrews	11	0	1	0	12	0
7	MF	(Australia)	Aivi Luik	9	2	1	0	10	2
8	MF	(Australia)	Ella Mastrantonio	6+5	0	0+1	0	12	0
9	FW	(Australia)	Rosie Sutton	5+6	5	0+1	0	12	5
10	MF	(Australia)	Jaymee Gibbons	0+3	0	0	0	3	0
11	FW	(Australia)	Lisa De Vanna	5+1	5	1	0	7	5
12	FW	(Australia)	Kate Gill	11	11	1	0	12	11
13	MF	(Australia)	Elisa D'Ovidio	9+3	3	1	0	13	3
14	MF	(Australia)	Collette McCallum	9+1	2	1	0	11	2
15	DF	(New Zealand)	Elizabeth Milne	11	1	1	0	12	1
16	DF	(Australia)	Thia Eastman	0+1	0	0	0	1	0
17	FW	(Australia)	Marianna Tabain	12	5	1	0	13	5
19	DF	(England)	Shawn Billam	0+5	0	0	0	5	0
20	GK	(Australia)	Zoe Palandri	0+1	0	0	0	1	0
26	GK	(United States)	Kaitlyn Savage	2	0	1	0	3	0
Player(s) transferred out but featured this season
30	GK	(Denmark)	Maja Blasch	1	0	0	0	1	0

=== Disciplinary record ===
Includes all competitions. The list is sorted by squad number when total cards are equal. Players with no cards not included in the list.

Rank	No.	Pos.	Nat.	Name	W-League						Total		
Rank	No.	Pos.	Nat.	Name	Regular season			Finals series			Total		
Rank	No.	Pos.	Nat.	Name	Booked	(yellow card) (yellow-red card)	Sent off (straight red)	Booked	(yellow card) (yellow-red card)	Sent off (straight red)	Booked	(yellow card) (yellow-red card)	Sent off (straight red)
1	13	MF	(Australia)	Elisa D'Ovidio	2	0	0	0	0	0	2	0	0
2	3	DF	(Wales)	Carys Hawkins	1	0	0	0	0	0	1	0	0
2	4	DF	(Australia)	Bronwyn Studman	1	0	0	0	0	0	1	0	0
2	11	FW	(Australia)	Lisa De Vanna	1	0	0	0	0	0	1	0	0
2	12	FW	(Australia)	Kate Gill	1	0	0	0	0	0	1	0	0
2	14	MF	(Australia)	Collette McCallum	1	0	0	0	0	0	1	0	0
Total					7	0	0	0	0	0	7	0	0

=== Clean sheets ===
Includes all competitions. The list is sorted by squad number when total clean sheets are equal. Numbers in parentheses represent games where both goalkeepers participated and both kept a clean sheet; the number in parentheses is awarded to the goalkeeper who was substituted on, whilst a full clean sheet is awarded to the goalkeeper who was on the field at the start of play. Goalkeepers with no clean sheets not included in the list.

Rank	No.	Nat.	Goalkeeper	W-League		Total
Rank	No.	Nat.	Goalkeeper	Regular season	Finals series	Total
1	1	(England)	Carly Telford	2	0	2
