= 2011–12 Perth Glory FC (women) season =

Perth Glory (W-League)
2011–12 season
- Chairman: Tony Sage
- Head Coach: Jamie Harnwell
- Stadium: 6PR Stadium
- W-League: 6th
- W-League Finals: DNQ
- Top goalscorer: Marianna Tabain (3)
- Biggest win: 4–2 vs. Newcastle Jets (H) (14 January 2012); W-League
- Biggest defeat: 0–11 vs. Sydney FC (A) (3 December 2011); W-League
| Home colours | Away colours | Third colours |

The 2011–12 season was Perth Glory Football Club's fourth season, in the W-League. Perth Glory finished 6th in their W-League season.

== Players ==
Note: Flags indicate national team as defined under FIFA eligibility rules; some limited exceptions apply. Players may hold more than one non-FIFA nationality.

| No. | Pos. | Nation | Player |
|---|---|---|---|
| 1 | GK | AUS | Mackenzie Arnold |
| 2 | DF | ENG | Shawn Billam |
| 3 | DF | WAL | Carys Hawkins |
| 4 | DF | AUS | Erika Elze |
| 5 | MF | AUS | Shannon May |
| 6 | FW | CRO | Katarina Jukic |
| 7 | DF | AUS | Sadie Lawrence |
| 8 | DF | AUS | Tanya Oxtoby |
| 9 | MF | ENG | Katie Holtham |

| No. | Pos. | Nation | Player |
|---|---|---|---|
| 10 | MF | AUS | Jaymee Gibbons |
| 11 | MF | AUS | Ella Mastrantonio |
| 12 | FW | AUS | Dani Calautti |
| 13 | MF | AUS | Elisa D'Ovidio |
| 14 | DF | AUS | Emily Dunn |
| 15 | FW | AUS | Lara Filocamo |
| 16 | MF | NOR | Lisa-Marie Woods |
| 17 | FW | AUS | Marianna Tabain |
| 19 | MF | AUS | Sarah Carroll |

== Transfers ==
=== Transfers in ===
| No. | Position | Name | From | Type/fee | Date | Ref. |
|---|---|---|---|---|---|---|
| 1 | GK | Mackenzie Arnold | Free agent | Free transfer | 13 October 2011 | |
| 2 | DF | Shawn Billam | (Australia) FW NTC | Free transfer | 13 October 2011 | |
| 4 | DF | Erika Elze | Brisbane Roar | Free transfer | 13 October 2011 | |
| 9 | MF | (England) Katie Holtham | (England) Doncaster Rovers Belles | Loan | 13 October 2011 | |
| 11 | MF | Ella Mastrantonio | Melbourne Victory | Free transfer | 13 October 2011 | |
| 18 | FW | Kate Gill | (Sweden) Linköping | Free transfer | 13 October 2011 | |
| 16 | MF | (Norway) Lisa-Marie Woods | (Denmark) Fortuna Hjørring | Free transfer | 15 October 2011 | |

=== Transfers out ===
| No. | Position | Name | To | Type/fee | Date | Ref. |
|---|---|---|---|---|---|---|
| 1 | GK | (Denmark) Tine Cederkvist | (Sweden) Rosengård | Loan return | 26 February 2011 | |
| 6 | DF | (United States) Alex Singer | (Sweden) Dalsjöfors GoIF | Free transfer | 26 February 2011 | |
| 9 | MF | Monnique Kofoed | Newcastle Jets | Free transfer | 12 October 2011 | |
| 4 | FW | Sam Kerr | Free agent | Free transfer | 12 October 2011 | |
| 7 | MF | (Sweden) Alexandra Nilsson | (Sweden) Umeå | Free transfer | 12 October 2011 | |
| 14 | MF | Collette McCallum | Free agent | Free transfer | 12 October 2011 | |

== Competitions ==
=== Overall record ===
| Competition | First match | Last match | Starting round | Final position | Record | | | | | | | |
| Competition | First match | Last match | Starting round | Final position | Pld | W | D | L | GF | GA | GD | Win % |
|---|---|---|---|---|---|---|---|---|---|---|---|---|
| W-League | 22 October 2011 | 14 January 2012 | Matchday 1 | 6th | 10 | 2 | 0 | 8 | 11 | 36 | −25 | 20.00 |
| Total | | | | | 10 | 2 | 0 | 8 | 11 | 36 | −25 | 20.00 |

Source: Competitions

=== W-League ===
==== League table ====
| Pos | Team | Pld | W | D | L | GF | GA | GD | Pts | Qualification |
|---|---|---|---|---|---|---|---|---|---|---|
| 1 | Canberra United (C) | 10 | 7 | 3 | 0 | 23 | 9 | +14 | 24 | Qualification to Finals series |
| 2 | Brisbane Roar | 10 | 6 | 3 | 1 | 20 | 11 | +9 | 21 | Qualification to Finals series |
| 3 | Sydney FC | 10 | 5 | 2 | 3 | 26 | 8 | +18 | 17 | Qualification to Finals series |
| 4 | Melbourne Victory | 10 | 5 | 2 | 3 | 21 | 9 | +12 | 17 | Qualification to Finals series |
| 5 | Newcastle Jets | 10 | 4 | 0 | 6 | 18 | 22 | −4 | 12 | |
| 6 | Perth Glory | 10 | 2 | 0 | 8 | 11 | 36 | −25 | 6 | |
| 7 | Adelaide United | 10 | 1 | 0 | 9 | 6 | 30 | −24 | 3 | |

Source: au.soccerway.com
Rules for classification: 1) points; 2) goal difference; 3) number of goals scored.
(C) Champions

==== Results summary ====
| Overall | | | | | | | | Home | | | | | | Away | | | | | |
| Pld | W | D | L | GF | GA | GD | Pts | W | D | L | GF | GA | GD | W | D | L | GF | GA | GD |
|---|---|---|---|---|---|---|---|---|---|---|---|---|---|---|---|---|---|---|---|
| 10 | 2 | 0 | 8 | 11 | 36 | −25 | 6 | 2 | 0 | 3 | 8 | 16 | −8 | 0 | 0 | 5 | 3 | 20 | −17 |

Source: worldfootball.net

==== Results by round ====
| Round | 1 | 2 | 3 | 4 | 5 | 7 | 8 | 9 | 6 | 10 | 11 | 12 |
|---|---|---|---|---|---|---|---|---|---|---|---|---|
| Ground | A | A | H | B | H | A | H | A | A | B | H | H |
| Result | L | L | W | B | L | L | L | L | L | B | L | W |
| Position | 6 | 6 | 5 | 6 | 6 | 6 | 6 | 7 | 6 | 7 | 7 | 6 |
| Points | 0 | 0 | 3 | 3 | 3 | 3 | 3 | 3 | 3 | 3 | 3 | 6 |

Source: worldfootball.net
A = Away; H = Home; W = Win; D = Draw; L = Loss

==== Matches ====
The league fixtures were announced on 27 September 2011.

Win Draw Loss

| 22 October 2011 1 | Melbourne Victory | 2–0 | Perth Glory | Melbourne |
| 17:00 AEDT | Friend 38'; Jackson 48' | Report | | Stadium: Veneto Club; Referee: Kate Jacewicz |

| 29 October 2011 2 | Canberra United | 3–2 | Perth Glory | Canberra |
| 15:00 AEDT | Heyman 64', 66', 80' | Report | Kete 21'; Tabain 89' | Stadium: McKellar Park; Referee: Kate Jacewicz |

| 5 November 2011 3 | Perth Glory | 2–1 | Adelaide United | Perth |
| 12:00 AWST | Elze 6'; Jukic 37' | Report | Quigley 2' | Stadium: nib Stadium; Referee: Casey Reibelt |

| 19 November 2011 5 | Perth Glory | 2–5 | Brisbane Roar | Perth |
| 16:00 AWST | Kete 25' (pen.); Tabain 78' | Report | Butt 6', 44', 74' (pen.); Gielnik 60'; Polkinghorne 72' | Stadium: 6PR Stadium; Referee: Trent Fleskens |

| 3 December 2011 7 | Sydney FC | 11–0 | Perth Glory | Sydney |
| 19:00 AEDT | Rollason 24', 42', 50'; Ledbrook 47', 78', 87'; Oxtoby 58' (o.g.); Khamis 59', 60', 75'; Simon 90+3' | Report | | Stadium: Leichhardt Oval; Referee: Kirralee Andruschak |

| 10 December 2011 8 | Perth Glory | 0–5 | Melbourne Victory | Perth |
| 16:00 AWST | | Report | Gorry 3', 23'; Taylor 24', 62', 78' | Stadium: 6PR Stadium; Referee: David Costello |

| 17 December 2011 9 | Adelaide United | 1–0 | Perth Glory | Adelaide |
| 16:30 ACDT | Ebbs 33' | Report | | Stadium: Burton Park; Referee: Stacey Sasopolous |

| 21 December 2011 6 | Newcastle Jets | 3–1 | Perth Glory | Newcastle |
| 15:00 AEDT | Andrews 23'; Bolger 55'; van Egmond 60' | Report | Holtham 78' | Stadium: Adamstown Oval; Attendance: 377; Referee: Katie Patterson |
Note: Match originally scheduled for 26 November 2011, but postponed due to wet weather. It was rescheduled for 21 December 2011.

| 7 January 2012 11 | Perth Glory | 0–3 | Sydney FC | Perth |
| 16:00 AWST | | Report | Oxtoby 6' (o.g.); Simon 22', 45' | Stadium: 6PR Stadium; Referee: David Costello |

| 14 January 2012 12 | Perth Glory | 4–2 | Newcastle Jets | Perth |
| 16:00 AWST | Jukic 9'; Hawkins 63'; D'Ovidio 72'; Tabain 82' | Report | De Vanna 76'; Kennedy 90' | Stadium: 6PR Stadium; Referee: Matthew Southern |

== Statistics ==
=== Appearances and goals ===
Includes all competitions. Players with no appearances not included in the list.

| No. | Pos. | Nat. | Name | W-League | | Total | |
| No. | Pos. | Nat. | Name | Apps | Goals | Apps | Goals |
|---|---|---|---|---|---|---|---|
| 1 | GK | (Australia) | Mackenzie Arnold | 10 | 0 | 10 | 0 |
| 2 | DF | (England) | Shawn Billam | 0+3 | 0 | 3 | 0 |
| 3 | DF | (Wales) | Carys Hawkins | 8+1 | 1 | 9 | 1 |
| 4 | DF | (Australia) | Erika Elze | 4+4 | 1 | 8 | 1 |
| 5 | MF | (Australia) | Shannon May | 7+3 | 0 | 10 | 0 |
| 6 | FW | (Croatia) | Katarina Jukic | 10 | 0 | 10 | 0 |
| 7 | DF | (Australia) | Sadie Lawrence | 5+3 | 0 | 8 | 0 |
| 8 | DF | (Australia) | Tanya Oxtoby | 10 | 0 | 10 | 0 |
| 9 | MF | (England) | Katie Holtham | 9 | 1 | 9 | 1 |
| 10 | MF | (Australia) | Jaymee Gibbons | 0+3 | 0 | 3 | 0 |
| 11 | MF | (Australia) | Ella Mastrantonio | 9+1 | 0 | 10 | 0 |
| 12 | FW | (Australia) | Dani Calautti | 7+1 | 0 | 8 | 0 |
| 13 | MF | (Australia) | Elisa D'Ovidio | 7+1 | 1 | 8 | 1 |
| 14 | DF | (Australia) | Emily Dunn | 6+1 | 0 | 7 | 0 |
| 15 | FW | (Australia) | Lara Filocamo | 4+4 | 0 | 8 | 0 |
| 16 | MF | (Norway) | Lisa-Marie Woods | 1 | 0 | 1 | 0 |
| 17 | FW | (Australia) | Marianna Tabain | 9+1 | 0 | 10 | 0 |
| 19 | MF | (Australia) | Sarah Carroll | 2+2 | 0 | 4 | 0 |
Player(s) transferred out but featured this season
| 18 | FW | (Australia) | Emma Kete | 4 | 0 | 4 | 0 |

=== Disciplinary record ===
Includes all competitions. The list is sorted by squad number when total cards are equal. Players with no cards not included in the list.

| Rank | No. | Pos. | Nat. | Name | W-League | | | Total | | |
| Rank | No. | Pos. | Nat. | Name | Booked | (yellow card) (yellow-red card) | Sent off (straight red) | Booked | (yellow card) (yellow-red card) | Sent off (straight red) |
|---|---|---|---|---|---|---|---|---|---|---|
| 1 | 9 | MF | (England) | Katie Holtham | 4 | 0 | 0 | 4 | 0 | 0 |
| 2 | 12 | FW | (Australia) | Dani Calautti | 2 | 0 | 0 | 2 | 0 | 0 |
| 2 | 13 | MF | (Australia) | Elisa D'Ovidio | 2 | 0 | 0 | 2 | 0 | 0 |
| 4 | 6 | FW | (Croatia) | Katarina Jukic | 1 | 0 | 0 | 1 | 0 | 0 |
| 4 | 15 | FW | (Australia) | Lara Filocamo | 1 | 0 | 0 | 1 | 0 | 0 |
| Total | | | | | 10 | 0 | 0 | 10 | 0 | 0 |
