= 2009 Perth Glory FC (women) season =

Perth Glory (W-League)
2009 season
- Chairman: Tony Sage
- Head Coach: John Gibson
- W-League: 6th
- W-League Finals: DNQ
- Top goalscorer: Marianna Tabain (4)
- Biggest win: 2–0 vs. Melbourne Victory (5 December 2009); W-League
- Biggest defeat: 0–6 vs. Brisbane Roar (31 October 2009); W-League
Home colours	Away colours

The 2009 season was Perth Glory Football Club (W-League)'s second season, in the W-League. Perth Glory finished 6th in their W-League season.

== Review ==
=== Background ===
Perth Glory's 2008–09 season ended finishing in seventh out of eight teams. Inaugural coach Nicola Williams was replaced by John Gibson ahead of the 2009 season. Tanya Oxtoby retained the club captaincy.

=== W-League ===
The season was played over 10 rounds, followed by a finals series.

The Glory opened their season against Melbourne Victory at Docklands Stadium on 3 October. Despite an early chance for Lisa De Vanna, when the ball was cleared off her feet by the Victory goalkeeper Melissa Barbieri, Glory were unable to create chances. The Victory scored in the 34th and 71st minutes to secure a 2–0 win.

Playing against Newcastle Jets at Perth Oval on 10 October, Glory took the lead on 10 minutes when Collette McCallum sent a corner into the six yard box where it took a deflection off De Vanna into the goal. McCallum was credited with the goal. The Glory dominated the first half with De Vanna being influential in attack, setting up several chances to score. The momentum of the match changed in the second half with the Jets taking control of the match but were unable to score. The match ended 1–0 to Perth Glory.

After being substituted in the 31st minute of Perth's game against Adelaide United on 24 October at Hindmarsh Stadium, Lisa De Vanna abused members of the Glory coaching staff, the fourth official and members of the crowd. De Vanna received a two-match ban from Football Federation Australia (FFA), with one match suspended until the end of the season. De Vanna's replacement Sam Kerr almost scored three minutes later when a run led to her being one-on-one with the goalkeeper. A 47th minute goal for Alex Singer from a Kerr cross secured a 1–0 victory for the Glory.

Heading into the last match of the season at Inglewood Stadium on 5 December, Melbourne Victory needed a point to qualify for the final series while Perth Glory were not able to qualify. Deep in the second half, the match remained scoreless with the Victory having the majority of shots on goal. Assisted by Kate Gill, second-half substitute De Vanna ran through the Victory defence and scored in the 81st minute. Gill put the match beyond doubt after 87 minutes with a 25-metre half-volley. The Glory finished the season in sixth, one point out of the finals positions.

== Players ==
Confirmed signings as of 2/10/09.

Note: Flags indicate national team as defined under FIFA eligibility rules; some limited exceptions apply. Players may hold more than one non-FIFA nationality.

No.	Pos.	Nation	Player
1	GK	AUS	Emma Wirkus
3	DF	WAL	Carys Hawkins
4	FW	AUS	Sam Kerr
5	MF	AUS	Shannon May
6	MF	AUS	Ella Mastrantonio
7	DF	AUS	Elissia Canham
8	DF	AUS	Tanya Oxtoby (captain)
9	MF	AUS	Dani Calautti
11	FW	AUS	Lisa De Vanna
13	MF	AUS	Elisa D'Ovidio

No.	Pos.	Nation	Player
14	MF	AUS	Collette McCallum
15	--	USA	Alex Singer
16	DF	AUS	Sadie Lawrence
17	MF	AUS	Marianna Tabain
18	FW	AUS	Ellis Glanfield
19	MF	AUS	Katarina Jukic
--	--	AUS	Zoe Palandri
--	FW	AUS	Kate Gill
--	FW	AUS	Ciara Conway
--	MF	AUS	Jaymee Gibbons

== Transfers ==
=== Transfers in ===
- Emma Wirkus (Adelaide United)
- Elissia Canham
- Sadie Lawrence
- Ellis Glanfield
- Zoe Palandri
- Kate Gill
- Alex Singer

=== Transfers out ===
- Kate Stewart
- Ciara Conway
- Katy Coghlan
- Elle Semmens
- Rachael Smith
- Shiya Lim
- Emily Dunn
- Maya Diederichsen
- Luisa Marzotto

== Competitions ==
=== Overall record ===
Competition	First match	Last match	Starting round	Final position	Record							
Competition	First match	Last match	Starting round	Final position	Pld	W	D	L	GF	GA	GD	Win %
W-League	3 October 2009	5 December 2009	Matchday 1	6th	10	4	1	5	11	22	−11	40.00
Total					10	4	1	5	11	22	−11	40.00

Source: Competitions

=== W-League ===
==== League table ====
Pos	Team	Pld	W	D	L	GF	GA	GD	Pts	Qualification
1	Sydney FC (C)	10	7	2	1	25	10	+15	23	Qualification to Finals series
2	Central Coast Mariners	10	7	1	2	24	7	+17	22	Qualification to Finals series
3	Brisbane Roar	10	6	3	1	24	7	+17	21	Qualification to Finals series
4	Canberra United	10	4	2	4	17	12	+5	14	Qualification to Finals series
5	Melbourne Victory	10	4	2	4	9	10	−1	14	
6	Perth Glory	10	4	1	5	11	22	−11	13	
7	Adelaide United	10	0	3	7	7	31	−24	3	
8	Newcastle Jets	10	0	2	8	7	25	−18	2	

Source: au.soccerway.com
Rules for classification: 1) points; 2) goal difference; 3) number of goals scored.
(C) Champions

==== Results summary ====
Overall								Home						Away					
Pld	W	D	L	GF	GA	GD	Pts	W	D	L	GF	GA	GD	W	D	L	GF	GA	GD
10	4	1	5	11	22	−11	13	3	1	1	8	5	+3	1	0	4	3	17	−14

Source: worldfootball.net

==== Results by round ====
Round	1	2	3	4	5	6	7	8	9	10
Ground	A	H	A	A	A	H	A	A	H	H
Result	L	W	D	W	L	L	L	L	W	W
Position	7	5	5	4	5	5	6	6	6	6
Points	0	3	4	7	7	7	7	7	10	13

Source: worldfootball.net
A = Away; H = Home; W = Win; D = Draw; L = Loss

==== Matches ====
The league fixtures were announced on 27 July 2009.

Win Draw Loss

3 October 2009 1	Melbourne Victory	2–0	Perth Glory	Melbourne
16:45 AEST	Barilla 34'; Thorlakson 71'	Report		Stadium: Etihad Stadium; Referee: Jacqui Melksham

10 October 2009 2	Perth Glory	1–0	Newcastle Jets	Perth
12:00 AWST	McCallum 10'	Report		Stadium: ME Bank Stadium; Referee: Lee Corey

17 October 2009 3	Perth Glory	2–2	Canberra United	Perth
15:00 AWST	McCallum 6'; Tabain 8'	Report	Tseng 61'; Sykes 82'	Stadium: Clipsal Stadium; Referee: Casey Reibelt

24 October 2009 4	Adelaide United	0–1	Perth Glory	Adelaide
14:30 ACDT		Report	Singer 47'	Stadium: Hindmarsh Stadium; Referee: Jacqui Melksham

31 October 2009 5	Brisbane Roar	6–0	Perth Glory	Brisbane
14:00 AEST	Harch 8', 54'; Beaumont 21', 80'; Beutel 20'; McDonnell 90+1'	Report		Stadium: Ballymore Stadium; Attendance: 579; Referee: Casey Reibelt

7 November 2009 6	Perth Glory	1–2	Central Coast Mariners	Perth
15:00 AWST	Tabain 63'	Report	Vandenbergh 20'; Heyman 57'	Stadium: Clipsal Stadium; Referee: Lee Corey

14 November 2009 7	Canberra United	4–0	Perth Glory	Canberra
17:00 AEDT	Sykeds 41'; Brush 52'; Raymond 77'; Gibbons 90+2'	Report		Stadium: McKellar Park; Attendance: 684; Referee: Kirralee Gardener

21 November 2009 8	Sydney FC	5–2	Perth Glory	Sydney
15:00 AEDT	Rydahl 12' (pen.); Khamis 14', 20'; Paaske 39'; Walsh 84'	Report	Kerr 7'; De Vanna 63'	Stadium: Leichhardt Oval; Referee: Prue Donohoe

28 November 2009 9	Perth Glory	2–1	Brisbane Roar	Perth
15:00 AWST	Gill 18', 63'	Report	Beutel 11'	Stadium: Clipsal Stadium; Referee: Rebecca Durcau

5 December 2009 10	Perth Glory	2–0	Melbourne Victory	Perth
17:15 AWST	De Vanna 81'; Gill 87'	Report		Stadium: Clipsal Stadium; Referee: Lee Corey

== Squad statistics ==
No.	Pos.	Name	W-League		W-League Finals		Total		Discipline	
No.	Pos.	Name	Apps	Goals	Apps	Goals	Apps	Goals	Yellow card	Red card
1	GK	(Australia) Emma Wirkus	10	0	0	0	10	0	0	0
3	DF	(Wales) Carys Hawkins	10	0	0	0	10	0	0	0
4	FW	(Australia) Sam Kerr	5	1	0	0	5	1	0	0
5	MF	(Australia) Shannon May	10	0	0	0	10	0	0	0
6	MF	(Australia) Ella Mastrantonio	8	0	0	0	8	0	1	0
7	DF	(Australia) Elissia Canham	3	0	0	0	3	0	0	0
8	DF	(Australia) Tanya Oxtoby	10	0	0	0	10	0	0	0
9	MF	(Australia) Dani Calautti	10	0	0	0	10	0	0	0
11	FW	(Australia) Lisa De Vanna	8	2	0	0	8	2	2	0
13	MF	(Australia) Elisa D'Ovidio	10	0	0	0	10	0	2	0
14	MF	(Australia) Collette McCallum	5	2	0	0	5	2	0	0
15	-	(United States) Alex Singer	9	1	0	0	9	1	0	0
16	DF	(Australia) Sadie Lawrence	8	0	0	0	8	0	0	0
17	MF	(Australia) Marianna Tabain	10	2	0	0	10	2	0	0
18	FW	(Australia) Ellis Glanfield	6	0	0	0	6	0	0	0
19	MF	(Australia) Katarina Jukic	3	0	0	0	3	0	0	0
--	-	(Australia) Zoe Palandri	0	0	0	0	0	0	0	0
--	FW	(Australia) Kate Gill	3	3	0	0	3	3	2	0
--	FW	(Australia) Ciara Conway	2	0	0	0	2	0	0	0
--	MF	(Australia) Jaymee Gibbons	2	0	0	0	2	0	0	0

Source: Soccerway
