= 2013–14 Perth Glory FC (women) season =

Perth Glory W-League
2013–14 season
- Chairman: Tony Sage
- Manager: Jamie Harnwell
- Stadium: Percy Doyle Reserve
- W-League: 5th
- Top goalscorer: Kate Gill (6)
| Home colours | Away colours |

The 2013–14 Perth Glory FC W-League season was the club's sixth participation in the W-League, since the league's formation in 2008.

== Season overview ==
Perth Glory entered the 2013–14 W-League season having finished second in the league in 2012–13 and missing out on a grand final appearance, losing a penalty shootout in the semifinals. Collette McCallum returned as captain.

=== Venues ===
The Glory were originally scheduled to host five matches at Inglewood Stadium (known at the time as Intiga Stadium) and one at Perth Oval. Their first home match, against Brisbane Roar, was moved to Percy Doyle Reserve due to the pitch at Inglewood not being up to standard. The remaining matches scheduled for Inglewood were moved to Percy Doyle Reserve.

== Match results ==
=== Legend ===
| Win | Draw | Loss |

=== W-League ===
| Date | Opponent | Venue | Result | Scorers | Attendance | Referee | Position | Refs |
|---|---|---|---|---|---|---|---|---|
| 9 November 2013 | Newcastle Jets | Away | 5–2 | Gill, McCallum, Julien, Sutton, Tabain | 1,047 | Patterson | 2 | |
| 16 November 2013 | Brisbane Roar | Home | 0–3 | | | Andruschak | 3 | |
| 1 December 2013 | Melbourne Victory | Home | 1–3 | Julien | | Reibelt | 6 | |
| 7 December 2013 | Adelaide United | Home | 1–0 | Sutton | | Durcau | 5 | |
| 14 December 2013 | Western Sydney Wanderers | Away | 0–3 | | | Smith | 6 | |
| 21 December 2013 | Canberra United | Home | 0–2 | | | Reibelt | 7 | |
| 5 January 2014 | Sydney FC | Away | 2–8 | Gill, Tabain | | Reibelt | 7 | |
| 12 January 2014 | Brisbane Roar | Away | 1–2 | Sutton | | Reibelt | 7 | |
| 18 January 2014 | Newcastle Jets | Home | 3–2 | D'Ovidio, Sutton, Tabain | | Andruschak | 7 | |
| 26 January 2014 | Canberra United | Away | 1–5 | Gill | 714 | Jacewicz | 7 | |
| 1 February 2014 | Melbourne Victory | Away | 1–0 | Gill | 300 | Reibelt | 6 | |
| 8 February 2014 | Western Sydney Wanderers | Home | 2–1 | Gill (2) | | Mitchenson | 5 | |

==== League table ====
| Pos | Team | Pld | W | D | L | GF | GA | GD | Pts | Qualification |
|---|---|---|---|---|---|---|---|---|---|---|
| 1 | Canberra United | 12 | 9 | 0 | 3 | 28 | 8 | +20 | 27 | Qualification to Finals series |
| 2 | Sydney FC | 12 | 8 | 2 | 2 | 37 | 14 | +23 | 26 | Qualification to Finals series |
| 3 | Melbourne Victory (C) | 12 | 7 | 2 | 3 | 23 | 12 | +11 | 23 | Qualification to Finals series |
| 4 | Brisbane Roar | 12 | 7 | 2 | 3 | 22 | 16 | +6 | 23 | Qualification to Finals series |
| 5 | Perth Glory | 12 | 5 | 0 | 7 | 17 | 31 | −14 | 15 | |
| 6 | Adelaide United | 12 | 3 | 4 | 5 | 12 | 15 | −3 | 13 | |
| 7 | Western Sydney Wanderers | 12 | 2 | 3 | 7 | 17 | 23 | −6 | 9 | |
| 8 | Newcastle Jets | 12 | 0 | 1 | 11 | 10 | 47 | −37 | 1 | |

Source: au.soccerway.com
Rules for classification: 1) points; 2) goal difference; 3) number of goals scored.
(C) Champions

==== Results summary ====
| Overall | | | | | | | | Home | | | | | | Away | | | | | |
| Pld | W | D | L | GF | GA | GD | Pts | W | D | L | GF | GA | GD | W | D | L | GF | GA | GD |
|---|---|---|---|---|---|---|---|---|---|---|---|---|---|---|---|---|---|---|---|
| 12 | 5 | 0 | 7 | 17 | 31 | −14 | 15 | 3 | 0 | 3 | 7 | 11 | −4 | 2 | 0 | 4 | 10 | 20 | −10 |

Last updated: 10 February 2014.
Source: Competitive Matches

== Player details ==
List of squad players, including number of appearances by competition

| No. | Pos. | Name | League | | Discipline | |
| No. | Pos. | Name | Apps | Goals | Yellow card | Red card |
|---|---|---|---|---|---|---|
| 1 | GK | (United States) Chantel Jones | 12 | 0 | 1 | 0 |
| 20 | GK | (Australia) Kathleen Waycott | 0 | 0 | 0 | 0 |
| 28 | DF | (Australia) Gabrielle Dal Busco | 0 | 0 | 0 | 0 |
| 2 | DF | (Australia) Sarah Carroll | 11 | 0 | 1 | 0 |
| 3 | DF | (Denmark) Cecilie Sandvej | 11 | 0 | 6 | 0 |
| 6 | DF | (Canada) Sasha Andrews | 8 | 0 | 1 | 0 |
| 16 | DF | (Australia) Thia Eastman | 9 | 0 | 0 | 0 |
| 18 | DF | (Australia) Amy Knights | 5 | 0 | 0 | 0 |
| 19 | DF | (Australia) Shawn Billam | 11 | 0 | 0 | 0 |
| 24 | DF | (Wales) Carys Hawkins | 2 | 0 | 1 | 0 |
| 4 | MF | (Australia) Bronwyn Studman | 11 | 0 | 3 | 1 |
| 5 | MF | (Australia) Shannon May | 12 | 0 | 0 | 0 |
| 8 | MF | (Australia) Ella Mastrantonio | 8 | 0 | 2 | 0 |
| 13 | MF | (Australia) Elisa D'Ovidio | 11 | 1 | 4 | 0 |
| 14 | MF | (Australia) Collette McCallum | 5 | 1 | 1 | 0 |
| 22 | MF | (Australia) Emily Henderson | 3 | 0 | 0 | 0 |
| 9 | FW | (Australia) Rosie Sutton | 10 | 4 | 0 | 0 |
| 12 | FW | (Australia) Kate Gill | 8 | 6 | 2 | 0 |
| 15 | FW | (Australia) Jessica Dillon | 7 | 0 | 0 | 0 |
| 17 | FW | (Australia) Marianna Tabain | 12 | 3 | 3 | 0 |
| 21 | FW | (Canada) Christina Julien | 9 | 2 | 0 | 0 |

Statistics accurate as of match played 8 February 2014.

=== Transfers in ===
Note: Flags indicate national team as defined under FIFA eligibility rules; some limited exceptions apply. Players may hold more than one non-FIFA nationality.

| No. | Pos. | Nation | Player |
|---|---|---|---|
| 21 | FW | CAN | Christina Julien (from (Russia) Rossiyanka) |
| 3 | DF | DEN | Cecilie Sandvej (from (Denmark) Brøndby IF) |
| 1 | GK | USA | Chantel Jones (from (United States) Washington Spirit) |
| 15 | FW | AUS | Jessica Dillon (from (Australia) The Gap Gators) |
| 18 | DF | AUS | Amy Knights (from (Australia) Northern Redbacks) |
| 20 | GK | AUS | Kathleen Waycott (from (Australia) Northern Redbacks) |
| 22 | MF | AUS | Emily Henderson (from (Australia) Football West NTC) |
| 28 | GK | AUS | Gabrielle Dal Busco (from (Australia) Football West NTC) |
| 24 | DF | WAL | Carys Hawkins (from (Sweden) Sunnanå SK) |

=== Transfers out ===
Note: Flags indicate national team as defined under FIFA eligibility rules; some limited exceptions apply. Players may hold more than one non-FIFA nationality.

| No. | Pos. | Nation | Player |
|---|---|---|---|
| 1 | GK | ENG | Carly Telford (to (England) Chelsea Ladies) |
| 3 | DF | WAL | Carys Hawkins (to (Sweden) Sunnanå SK) |
| 10 | MF | AUS | Jaymee Gibbons |
| 11 | FW | AUS | Lisa De Vanna (to (Australia) Melbourne Victory) |
| 15 | DF | NZL | Elizabeth Milne |
| 8 | MF | AUS | Ella Mastrantonio (to (Australia) Melbourne Victory) |

=== Goal scorers ===
| Total | Player | | Goals per round | | | | | | | | | | | |
| Total | Player | | 1 | 2 | 3 | 4 | 5 | 6 | 7 | 8 | 9 | 10 | 11 | 12 |
|---|---|---|---|---|---|---|---|---|---|---|---|---|---|---|
| 6 | (Australia) | Kate Gill | 1 | | | | | | 1 | | | 1 | 1 | 2 |
| 4 | (Australia) | Rosie Sutton | 1 | | | 1 | | | | 1 | 1 | | | |
| 3 | (Australia) | Marianna Tabain | 1 | | | | | | 1 | | 1 | | | |
| 2 | (Canada) | Christina Julien | 1 | | 1 | | | | | | | | | |
| 1 | (Australia) | Collette McCallum | 1 | | | | | | | | | | | |
| 1 | (Australia) | Elisa D'Ovidio | | | | | | | | | 1 | | | |
| 17 | Total | | 5 | 0 | 1 | 1 | 0 | 0 | 2 | 1 | 3 | 1 | 1 | 2 |

==== Results by round ====
| Round | 1 | 2 | 3 | 4 | 5 | 6 | 7 | 8 | 9 | 10 | 11 | 12 |
|---|---|---|---|---|---|---|---|---|---|---|---|---|
| Ground | A | H | H | H | A | H | A | A | H | A | A | H |
| Result | W | L | L | W | L | L | L | L | W | L | W | W |
| Position | 2 | 3 | 6 | 5 | 6 | 7 | 7 | 7 | 7 | 7 | 6 | 5 |

Updated to match(es) played on 10 February 2014. Source: Competitive Matches
A = Away; H = Home; W = Win; D = Draw; L = Loss
