= 2014 Perth Glory FC (women) season =

Perth Glory W-League
2014 season
- Chairman: Tony Sage
- Manager: Jamie Harnwell
- Stadium: Ashfield Reserve
- W-League: 1st
- W-League Finals series: Runners-up
- Top goalscorer: League: Kate Gill (12); All: Kate Gill (13)
Home colours	Away colours

The 2014 Perth Glory FC W-League season was the club's seventh participation in the W-League, since the league's formation in 2008.

During this season, the Glory Women broke several W-League records including most points in a single season (30), as well as most goals scored by a player in a single game (5, Kate Gill). Gill also won the Season 7 Golden Boot award for the second time in her W-League career, with a total of 12 goals. They began the season going from strength to strength notching 6 straight wins, their best ever start to a season.

This was the final season before Perth Glory FC resumed control of the club from Football West. With no premiership trophy being offered by Football Federation Australia, Football West commissioned a trophy when the team won the W-League premiership against Western Sydney Wanderers.

== Players ==
=== Squad information ===
Note: Flags indicate national team as defined under FIFA eligibility rules; some limited exceptions apply. Players may hold more than one non-FIFA nationality.

No.	Pos.	Nation	Player
1	GK	AUS	Mackenzie Arnold
2	MF	AUS	Sarah Carroll
3	DF	WAL	Carys Hawkins
4	DF	AUS	Bronwyn Studman
5	MF	AUS	Shannon May
6	MF	AUS	Alanna Kennedy
7	FW	AUS	Gabe Marzano
8	DF	AUS	Shawn Billam
9	MF	AUS	Caitlin Foord
10	FW	AUS	Katarina Jukic
11	MF	AUS	Emily Henderson

No.	Pos.	Nation	Player
12	FW	AUS	Kate Gill
13	MF	AUS	Elisa D'Ovidio
14	MF	AUS	Collette McCallum (Captain)
15	DF	CAN	Shelina Zadorsky
16	DF	AUS	Thia Eastman
17	FW	AUS	Marianna Tabain
18	GK	AUS	Gabrielle Dal Busco
19	MF	AUS	Katie Schubert
20	MF	AUS	Sam Kerr
29	GK	AUS	Kathleen Waycott

=== Transfers in ===
Note: Flags indicate national team as defined under FIFA eligibility rules; some limited exceptions apply. Players may hold more than one non-FIFA nationality.

No.	Pos.	Nation	Player
15	DF	CAN	Shelina Zadorsky (from (Canada) Ottawa Fury)
20	MF	AUS	Sam Kerr (from (Australia) Sydney FC)
6	MF	AUS	Alanna Kennedy (from (Australia) Western Sydney Wanderers)
1	GK	AUS	Mackenzie Arnold (from (Australia) Western Sydney Wanderers)
9	MF	AUS	Caitlin Foord (from (United States) Sky Blue FC)
19	MF	AUS	Katie Schubert (from (Australia) Ashfield SC)
7	FW	AUS	Gabe Marzano (from (Australia) The Gap)
3	DF	WAL	Carys Hawkins (from (Iceland) Fylkir Reykjavík)

=== Transfers out ===
Note: Flags indicate national team as defined under FIFA eligibility rules; some limited exceptions apply. Players may hold more than one non-FIFA nationality.

No.	Pos.	Nation	Player
1	GK	USA	Chantel Jones (to (United States) Washington Spirit/ (Australia) Canberra United)
3	DF	DEN	Cecilie Sandvej (to (United States) Washington Spirit)
6	DF	CAN	Sasha Andrews (to (United States) Pali Blues)
9	FW	AUS	Rosie Sutton
15	FW	AUS	Jessica Dillon
18	DF	AUS	Amy Knights
24	DF	WAL	Carys Hawkins (to (Iceland) Fylkir Reykjavík)

== Competitions ==
=== W-League ===
==== Fixtures ====
14 September 2014 1	Perth Glory	2–1	Brisbane Roar	Perth
12:00 AWST	K. Gill 12', 53' (pen.)	Report	Gielnik 90+4' (pen.)	Stadium: Ashfield Reserve; Referee: Rachel Mitchenson

20 September 2014 2	Newcastle Jets	1–2	Perth Glory	Newcastle
15:00 AEST	Andrews 62'	Report	Tabain 34'; Kennedy 45+1'	Stadium: Wanderers Oval; Attendance: 673; Referee: Kelly Jones

27 September 2014 3	Perth Glory	3–1	Adelaide United	Perth
15:00 AWST	D'Ovidio 45'; Kerr 56'; K. Gill 59'	Report	Woods 46'	Stadium: Ashfield Reserve; Referee: Lara Smith

5 October 2014 4	Western Sydney Wanderers	1–10	Perth Glory	Sydney
15:00 AEDT	Petinos 51'	Report	Kerr 45', 45+1'; K. Gill 49', 53', 60', 69', 78'; Foord 54', 86'; Kennedy 73'	Stadium: Marconi Stadium; Referee: Rebecca Durcau

11 October 2014 5	Perth Glory	3–0	Canberra United	Perth
16:00 AWST	Zadorsky 14'; K. Gill 63' (pen.), 80'	Report		Stadium: Ashfield Reserve; Referee: Kirralee Andruschak

18 October 2014 6	Perth Glory	1–0	Sydney FC	Perth
15:00 AWST	Tabain 51'	Report		Stadium: Ashfield Reserve; Referee: Casey Reibelt

25 October 2014 7	Adelaide United	1–0	Perth Glory	Adelaide
14:30 ACDT	Moore 61'	Report		Stadium: Adelaide Shores Football Centre; Referee: Kirralee Andruschak

2 November 2014 8	Melbourne Victory	1–3	Perth Glory	Melbourne
15:00 AEDT	Quigley 4'	Report	Kennedy 40'; D'Ovidio 81'; Foord 90'	Stadium: Lakeside Stadium; Referee: Rebecca Durcau

8 November 2014 9	Perth Glory	4–2	Newcastle Jets	Perth
15:00 AWST	Foord 21'; Kerr 24', 45+4'; D'Ovidio 84'	Report	van Egmond 7'; Andrews 89'	Stadium: Ashfield Reserve; Referee: Katie Patterson

15 November 2014 10	Perth Glory	5–0	Western Sydney Wanderers	Perth
15:00 AWST	Kerr 17', 35'; McCallum 39'; Tabain 60'; K. Gill 87'	Report		Stadium: Ashfield Reserve; Referee: Rachel Mitchenson

30 November 2014 11	Sydney FC	0–5	Perth Glory	Sydney
15:00 AEDT		Report	Kerr 7', 56', 73'; K. Gill 25' (pen.); Foord 45+1'	Stadium: Leichhardt Oval; Referee: Kate Jacewicz

7 December 2014 12	Canberra United	2–1	Perth Glory	Canberra
15:00 AEDT	Heyman 68'; Sykes 86'	Report	Kerr 52'	Stadium: Viking Park; Referee: Rebecca Durcau

14 December 2014 Semi-final	Perth Glory	3–0	Sydney FC	Perth
12:00 AWST	D'Ovidio 10'; K. Gill 37'; Marzano 70'	Report		Stadium: nib Stadium; Attendance: 1,389; Referee: Casey Reibelt

21 December 2014 Grand final	Perth Glory	1–3	Canberra United	Perth
12:00 AWST	McCallum 63'	Report	Ochs 20'; Sykes 75', 78'	Stadium: nib Stadium; Attendance: 2,671; Referee: Kate Jacewicz

==== League table ====
Pos	Team	Pld	W	D	L	GF	GA	GD	Pts	Qualification
1	Perth Glory	12	10	0	2	39	10	+29	30	Qualification to Finals series
2	Melbourne Victory	12	6	2	4	26	15	+11	20	Qualification to Finals series
3	Canberra United (C)	12	6	2	4	22	18	+4	20	Qualification to Finals series
4	Sydney FC	12	5	3	4	17	16	+1	18	Qualification to Finals series
5	Newcastle Jets	12	5	2	5	25	21	+4	17	
6	Brisbane Roar	12	4	2	6	18	19	−1	14	
7	Adelaide United	12	3	1	8	9	29	−20	10	
8	Western Sydney Wanderers	12	2	2	8	14	42	−28	8	

Source: au.soccerway.com
Rules for classification: 1) points; 2) goal difference; 3) number of goals scored.
(C) Champions

==== Results summary ====
Overall								Home						Away					
Pld	W	D	L	GF	GA	GD	Pts	W	D	L	GF	GA	GD	W	D	L	GF	GA	GD
12	10	0	2	39	10	+29	30	6	0	0	18	4	+14	4	0	2	21	6	+15

Last updated: 7 December 2014.
Source: Competitive Matches

==== Results by round ====
Round	1	2	3	4	5	6	7	8	9	10	11	12
Ground	H	A	H	A	H	H	A	A	H	H	A	A
Result	W	W	W	W	W	W	L	W	W	W	W	L
Position	3	3	2	1	1	1	1	1	1	1	1	1

Updated to match(es) played on 7 December 2014. Source: Competitive Matches
A = Away; H = Home; W = Win; D = Draw; L = Loss

==== Goal scorers ====
Total	Player		Goals per Round											
Total	Player		1	2	3	4	5	6	7	8	9	10	11	12
12	(Australia)	Kate Gill	2		1	5	2					1	1	
11	(Australia)	Sam Kerr			1	2					2	2	3	1
5	(Australia)	Caitlin Foord				2				1	1		1	
3	(Australia)	Alanna Kennedy		1		1				1				
3	(Australia)	Elisa D'Ovidio			1					1	1			
3	(Australia)	Marianna Tabain		1				1				1		
1	(Canada)	Shelina Zadorsky					1							
1	(Australia)	Collette McCallum										1		
39	TOTAL		2	2	3	10	3	1	0	3	4	5	5	1

== Awards ==
- Player of the Week (Round 8) – Caitlin Foord
- Player of the Week (Semi-finals) – Kate Gill
