= 2016–17 Perth Glory FC (women) season =

Perth Glory W-League
2016–17 season
- Chairman: Tony Sage
- Manager: Bobby Despotovski; Collette McCallum (assistant)
- Stadium: Dorrien Gardens, Perth
- W-League: Runners-up
- W-League finals series: Runners-up
- Top goalscorer: League: Sam Kerr (10 goals); All: Sam Kerr (10 goals)
- Highest home attendance: 4,591 vs Melbourne City (12 February 2017)
- Lowest home attendance: 477 vs Newcastle Jets (2 January 2017)
- Average home league attendance: 807
Home colours	Away colours

The 2016–17 Perth Glory FC W-League season was the club's ninth participation in the W-League, since the league's formation in 2008.

== Players ==
=== Squad information ===
As of 11 December 2016

Note: Flags indicate national team as defined under FIFA eligibility rules; some limited exceptions apply. Players may hold more than one non-FIFA nationality.

No.	Pos.	Nation	Player
1	GK	AUS	Melissa Maizels
2	DF	AUS	Sarah Carroll
3	DF	AUS	Kim Carroll
4	MF	USA	Alyssa Mautz (on loan from Chicago Red Stars)
5	DF	AUS	Patricia Charalambous
6	MF	AUS	Carla Bennett
7	MF	USA	Nikki Stanton (on loan from Sky Blue FC)
8	MF	AUS	Shawn Billam
9	FW	AUS	Rosie Sutton
10	MF	USA	Vanessa DiBernardo (on loan from Chicago Red Stars)

No.	Pos.	Nation	Player
11	MF	AUS	Emily Henderson
12	MF	AUS	Roisin Connolly
13	MF	AUS	Jaymee Gibbons
14	MF	AUS	Caitlin Doeglas
15	DF	AUS	Angelique Stannett
17	DF	AUS	Natasha Rigby
18	GK	AUS	Gabrielle Dal Busco
19	DF	AUS	Abbey Meakins
20	FW	AUS	Sam Kerr (Captain)
22	DF	MEX	Arianna Romero
24	GK	AUS	Morgan Aquino

=== Transfers ===
^{Note: Flags indicate national team as defined under FIFA eligibility rules. Players may hold more than one non-FIFA nationality.}

Transfers In
Player	Position	From	Ref.
(Australia) Rosie Sutton	FW	Adelaide United	
(United States) Alyssa Mautz	MF	(United States) Chicago Red Stars	
(Mexico) Arianna Romero	DF	(Iceland) ÍBV	
(Australia) Melissa Maizels	GK	Canberra United	
(Australia) Patricia Charalambous	DF		
(Australia) Roisin Connolly	MF		
(Australia) Jaymee Gibbons	MF		
(Australia) Abby Meakins	DF		
(Australia) Natasha Rigby	DF		

Transfers Out
Player	Position	To	Ref.
(Australia) Caitlin Foord	MF	Sydney FC	
(Australia) Mackenzie Arnold	GK	Brisbane Roar	
(Australia) Danielle Brogan	DF		
(England) Katie Holtham	DF		
(Australia) Ellie Lamonte	FW		
(Australia) Ella Mastrantonio	MF		
(Australia) Shannon May	MF		
(Australia) Katie Schubert	FW		

== Statistics ==
=== Squad statistics ===
N	Pos.	Nat.	Name	Total					W-League
N	Pos.	Nat.	Name	Apps	Goals	Yellow card	Second yellow card	Red card	Apps	Goals	Yellow card	Second yellow card	Red card
1	GK	(Australia)	Melissa Maizels	6	0	0	0	0	6+0	0	0	0	0
2	DF	(Australia)	Sarah Carroll	14	0	2	0	0	13+1	0	2	0	0
3	DF	(Australia)	Kim Carroll	14	0	2	0	0	14+0	0	2	0	0
4	MF	(United States)	Alyssa Mautz	14	0	1	0	0	14+0	0	1	0	0
5	DF	(Australia)	Patricia Charalambous	5	0	2	0	0	4+1	0	2	0	0
6	MF	(Australia)	Carla Bannett	4	0	0	0	0	2+2	0	0	0	0
7	MF	(United States)	Nikki Stanton	13	0	4	0	0	13+0	0	4	0	0
8	MF	(Australia)	Shawn Billam	13	1	2	0	0	7+6	1	2	0	0
9	FW	(Australia)	Rosie Sutton	14	7	0	0	0	14+0	7	0	0	0
10	MF	(United States)	Vanessa DiBernardo	14	6	1	0	0	13+1	6	1	0	0
13	MF	(Australia)	Jaymee Gibbons	13	0	1	0	0	6+7	0	1	0	0
14	MF	(Australia)	Caitlin Doeglas	8	2	0	0	0	2+6	2	0	0	0
15	DF	(Australia)	Angelique Stannett	0	0	0	0	0	0+0	0	0	0	0
17	DF	(Australia)	Natasha Rigby	12	0	2	0	0	11+1	0	2	0	0
18	GK	(Australia)	Gabrielle Dal Busco	9	0	0	0	0	8+1	0	0	0	0
20	FW	(Australia)	Sam Kerr	13	10	1	1	0	13+0	10	1	1	0
22	DF	(Mexico)	Arianna Romero	14	0	1	0	0	14+0	0	1	0	0
24	GK	(Australia)	Morgan Aquino	0	0	0	0	0	0+0	0	0	0	0
Players no longer at the club:
12	MF	(Australia)	Roisin Connolly	0	0	0	0	0	+	-	-	-	-
19	DF	(Australia)	Abbey Meakins	0	0	0	0	0	+	-	-	-	-

- Source: au.women.soccerway.com
- (yellow card) = Number of bookings; (second yellow card) = Number of sending offs after a second yellow card; (red card) = Number of sending offs by a direct red card.

== Competitions ==
=== W-League ===
==== Fixtures ====
6 November 2016 1	Perth Glory	4–2	Western Sydney Wanderers	Perth
18:30 AWST	Doeglas 1'; Sutton 22'; Kerr 68', 83'	Report	Burgess 38'; Petinos 50'	Stadium: nib Stadium; Attendance: 2,011; Referee: Kelly Jones

12 November 2016 2	Perth Glory	0–0	Brisbane Roar	Perth
16:00 AWST		Report		Stadium: Dorrien Gardens; Attendance: 659; Referee: Lara Lee

20 November 2016 3	Newcastle Jets	1–0	Perth Glory	Newcastle
14:30 AEDT	Hoy 48' (pen.)	Report		Stadium: McDonald Jones Stadium; Attendance: 3,650; Referee: Lara Lee

4 December 2016 5	Melbourne Victory	0–2	Perth Glory	Melbourne
16:00 AEDT		Report	Sutton 17'; DiBernardo 64'	Stadium: Lakeside Stadium; Attendance: 264; Referee: Rebecca Durcau

11 December 2016 6	Perth Glory	1–0	Sydney FC	Perth
16:00 AWST	Kerr 18'	Report		Stadium: Dorrien Gardens; Attendance: 481; Referee: Rachel Mitchenson

17 December 2016 7	Adelaide United	1–4	Perth Glory	Adelaide
19:30 ACDT	Huerta 65'	Report	Kerr 35', 67'; Sutton 62'; DiBernardo 82' (pen.)	Stadium: Elite Systems Football Centre; Attendance: 705; Referee: Katie Patterson

27 December 2016 8	Melbourne City	2–3	Perth Glory	Melbourne
17:20 AEDT	Fishlock 60'; Luik 72'	Report	Sutton 47'; Kerr 77', 84'	Stadium: AAMI Park; Attendance: 1,938; Referee: Casey Reibelt

2 January 2017 10	Perth Glory	1–1	Newcastle Jets	Perth
16:00 AWST	Kerr 69'	Report	Kingsley 46'	Stadium: Dorrien Gardens; Attendance: 477; Referee: Rachel Mitchenson

8 January 2017 11	Perth Glory	3–2	Melbourne Victory	Perth
16:00 AWST	Kerr 75'; DiBernardo 80' (pen.); Sutton 85'	Report	Romero 52' (o.g.); Mautz 59' (o.g.)	Stadium: Dorrien Gardens; Attendance: 578; Referee: Kate Jacewicz

14 January 2017 12	Canberra United	7–2	Perth Glory	Canberra
16:00 AEDT	Sykes 6', 19', 45', 46'; Ochs 25'; Maher 33'; Raso 49'	Report	DiBernardo 57' (pen.); Kerr 79'	Stadium: McKellar Park; Attendance: 1,153; Referee: Kate Jacewicz

22 January 2017 13	Perth Glory	1–2	Adelaide United	Perth
16:00 AWST	Sutton 10'	Report	Colaprico 15', 84'	Stadium: Dorrien Gardens; Attendance: 637; Referee: Casey Reibelt

29 January 2017 14	Western Sydney Wanderers	0–1	Perth Glory	Sydney
15:00 AEDT		Report	Doeglas 90+2'	Stadium: Popondetta Park; Attendance: 332; Referee: Rebecca Durcau

4 February 2017 Semi-finals	Perth Glory	5–1	Sydney FC	Perth
15:30 AWST	DiBernardo 29' (pen.), 77'; Kennedy 58' (o.g.); Sutton 79'; Billam 90+3'	Report	Simon 23'	Stadium: nib Stadium; Attendance: 1,592; Referee: Casey Reibelt

12 February 2017 Grand final	Perth Glory	0–2	Melbourne City	Perth
16:30 AWST		Report	Fishlock 45+1'; Yanez 72'	Stadium: nib Stadium; Attendance: 4,591; Referee: Kate Jacewicz

==== League table ====
Pos	Team	Pld	W	D	L	GF	GA	GD	Pts	Qualification
1	Canberra United	12	7	2	3	33	21	+12	23	Qualification to Finals series
2	Perth Glory	12	7	2	3	22	18	+4	23	Qualification to Finals series
3	Sydney FC	12	7	1	4	22	16	+6	22	Qualification to Finals series
4	Melbourne City (C)	12	6	2	4	19	14	+5	20	Qualification to Finals series
5	Newcastle Jets	12	4	3	5	18	18	0	15	
6	Adelaide United	12	3	5	4	31	26	+5	14	
7	Brisbane Roar	12	4	1	7	15	21	−6	13	
8	Western Sydney Wanderers	12	4	1	7	14	29	−15	13	
9	Melbourne Victory	12	2	3	7	17	28	−11	9	

Source: A-Leagues
Rules for classification: 1) points; 2) goal difference; 3) number of goals scored.
(C) Champions
