= 2019–20 Perth Glory FC (women) season =

Perth Glory W-League
2019–20 season
- Chairman: Tony Sage
- Manager: Bobby Despotovski
- Stadium: Dorrien Gardens
- W-League: 7th
- Top goalscorer: Morgan Andrews (7 goals)

The 2019–20 Perth Glory FC W-League season was the club's twelfth season in the W-League.

== Players ==
=== Squad information ===
Updated 13 November 2019 Note: Flags indicate national team as defined under FIFA eligibility rules; some limited exceptions apply. Players may hold more than one non-FIFA nationality.

No.	Pos.	Nation	Player
1	GK	AUS	Eliza Campbell
2	DF	AUS	Sarah Carroll
3	DF	AUS	Kim Carroll
4	MF	AUS	Ayesha Norrie
5	MF	AUS	Shannon May
6	DF	MEX	Arianna Romero (on loan from Houston Dash)
7	DF	ESP	Celia Jiménez (on loan from Reign FC)
8	MF	USA	Morgan Andrews (on loan from Reign FC)
9	FW	USA	Crystal Thomas (on loan from Washington Spirit)
10	DF	AUS	Julia Sardo
11	MF	AUS	Leticia McKenna
12	DF	AUS	Jenna Onions

No.	Pos.	Nation	Player
13	MF	AUS	Jamie-Lee Gale
14	MF	AUS	Caitlin Doeglas
15	MF	AUS	Alexia Moreno
16	DF	AUS	Isabella Wallhead
17	FW	AUS	Liana Cook
18	FW	AUS	Isabella Foletta
19	FW	AUS	Hana Lowry
21	GK	AUS	Morgan Aquino
22	FW	AUS	Abbey Green
24	DF	AUS	Natasha Rigby (Captain)
28	FW	AUS	Katarina Jukic
—	GK	PHI	Stacey Cavill

- Coach: Bobby Despotovski
- Assistant Coach: Jessine Bonzas

=== Transfers in ===
No.	Pos.	Nat.	Name	Age	Moving from	Type	Transfer window	Ends	Transfer fee	Source
7	DF	(Spain)	Celia Jiménez		(United States) Reign FC	Loan	Pre-season			
8	MF	(United States)	Morgan Andrews		(United States) Reign FC	Loan	Pre-season			
6	DF	(Mexico)	Arianna Romero		(United States) Houston Dash	Loan	Pre-season			
9	FW	(United States)	Crystal Thomas		(United States) Washington Spirit	Loan	Pre-season			
28	FW	(Australia)	Katarina Jukic		Queens Park		Pre-season			
4	MF	(Australia)	Ayesha Norrie		(United States) LA Galaxy OC	Loan	Pre-season			
10	DF	(Australia)	Julia Sardo		Alamein FC		Pre-season			

=== Transfers out ===
No.	Pos.	Nat.	Name	Age	Moving to	Type	Transfer window	Transfer fee	Source
4	MF	(United States)	Alyssa Mautz		(United States) Chicago Red Stars	Loan return	Pre-season		
25	DF	(United States)	Katie Naughton		(United States) Chicago Red Stars	Loan return	Pre-season		
7	MF	(United States)	Nikki Stanton		(United States) Chicago Red Stars	Loan return	Pre-season		
10	MF	(Australia)	Jacynta Galabadaarachchi		(England) West Ham United		Pre-season		
9	FW	(United States)	Rachel Hill		(United States) Orlando Pride	Loan return	Pre-season		
20	FW	(Australia)	Sam Kerr		(England) Chelsea		Pre-season		

== W-League ==
=== League table ===
Pos	Team	Pld	W	D	L	GF	GA	GD	Pts	Qualification
1	Melbourne City (C)	12	11	1	0	27	4	+23	34	Qualification to Finals series
2	Melbourne Victory	12	7	2	3	24	14	+10	23	Qualification to Finals series
3	Sydney FC	12	7	1	4	21	13	+8	22	Qualification to Finals series
4	Western Sydney Wanderers	12	7	1	4	24	20	+4	22	Qualification to Finals series
5	Brisbane Roar	12	5	2	5	22	19	+3	17	
6	Canberra United	12	4	1	7	13	29	−16	13	
7	Perth Glory	12	3	2	7	19	24	−5	11	
8	Adelaide United	12	2	1	9	12	24	−12	7	
9	Newcastle Jets	12	2	1	9	12	27	−15	7	

Source: A-Leagues
Rules for classification: 1) points; 2) goal difference; 3) number of goals scored.
(C) Champions

=== Matches ===
Win Draw Loss

17 November 2019 1	Canberra United	2–0	Perth Glory	Canberra
	Charley 6', 11'	Report		Stadium: McKellar Park; Attendance: 1,482; Referee: Isabella Blaess

1 December 2019 3	Perth Glory	1–3	Sydney FC	Perth
	Doeglas 46'	Report	Siemsen 3', 6'; Foord 39' (pen.)	Stadium: Dorrien Gardens; Attendance: 797; Referee: Rachel Mitchenson

7 December 2019 4	Perth Glory	1–2	Newcastle Jets	Perth
	Celia 57'	Report	Flannery 23'; Andrews 46'	Stadium: Dorrien Gardens; Referee: Lara Lee

13 December 2019 5	Perth Glory	1–1	Canberra United	Perth
	K. Carroll 90'	Report	Charley 15'	Stadium: Dorrien Gardens; Attendance: 365; Referee: Georgia Ghirardello

19 December 2019 6	Melbourne City	1–0	Perth Glory	Melbourne
	Stott 62'	Report		Stadium: ABD Stadium; Attendance: 600; Referee: Kelly Jones

28 December 2019 7	Perth Glory	1–2	Melbourne Victory	Perth
	McKenna 60'	Report	Jackson 33', 53'	Stadium: Dorrien Gardens; Attendance: 618; Referee: Isabella Blaess

3 January 2020 8	Adelaide United	2–2	Perth Glory	Adelaide
	Dawber 38'; M. Fowler 45'	Report	Thomas 52'; Andrews 90+3' (pen.)	Stadium: Marden Sports Complex; Attendance: 565; Referee: Kate Jacewicz

19 January 2020 10	Western Sydney Wanderers	3–1	Perth Glory	Sydney
	Cooper 3'; Vine 56'; Wallhead 86' (o.g.)	Report	Doeglas 53'	Stadium: Bankwest Stadium; Attendance: 3,024; Referee: Isabella Libri

23 January 2020 11	Newcastle Jets	2–4	Perth Glory	Newcastle
	Tamplin 75'; Allan 83'	Report	Lowry 22'; Andrews 45+2' (pen.); Doeglas 65'; Jiménez 78'	Stadium: McDonald Jones Stadium; Attendance: 828; Referee: Georgia Ghirardello

16 February 2020 12	Perth Glory	4–2	Brisbane Roar	Perth
	Andrews 3', 25' (pen.); Thomas 12'; Norrie 90+3'	Report	Pickett 33'; Yallop 57'	Stadium: Dorrien Gardens; Attendance: 498; Referee: Casey Reibelt

22 February 2020 13	Sydney FC	1–2	Perth Glory	Wollongong
	K. Carroll 90+3' (o.g.)	Report	Andrews 41', 58'	Stadium: WIN Stadium; Referee: Kelly Jones

29 February 2020 14	Perth Glory	2–3	Western Sydney Wanderers	Bunbury
	Jiménez 62'; Andrews 83'	Report	Staab 3'; Hamilton 11', 28'	Stadium: WML Stadium; Attendance: 1,175; Referee: Georgia Ghirardello

=== Results summary ===
Overall								Home						Away					
Pld	W	D	L	GF	GA	GD	Pts	W	D	L	GF	GA	GD	W	D	L	GF	GA	GD
12	3	2	7	19	24	−5	11	1	1	4	10	13	−3	2	1	3	9	11	−2

Last updated: complete.
Source: Competitive Matches

=== Results by round ===
Round	1	2	3	4	5	6	7	8	9	10	11	12	13	14
Ground	A	B	H	H	h	A	H	A	B	A	A	H	A	H
Result	L	✖	L	L	D	L	L	D	✖	L	W	W	W	L
Position	8	9	9	9	8	8	8	8	8	8	8	7	7	7

Source: w-league.com.au
A = Away; H = Home; B = Bye; W = Win; D = Draw; L = Loss
