= 2008–09 Perth Glory FC (women) season =

Perth Glory (W-League)
2008–09 season
- Chairman: Tony Sage
- Head Coach: Nicola Williams
- W-League: 7th
- W-League Finals: DNQ
- Top goalscorer: Marianna Tabain (4)
- Highest home attendance: 693 vs. Newcastle Jets (28 December 2008); W-League
- Lowest home attendance: 479 vs. Canberra United (30 November 2008); W-League
- Biggest win: 3–1 vs. Adelaide United (A) (19 December 2008); W-League
- Biggest defeat: 0–4 vs. Sydney FC (H) (25 October 2008); W-League
| Home colours | Away colours |

The 2008–09 season was Perth Glory Football Club (W-League)'s first season, in the newly formed women's league in Australia the W-League. Perth Glory finished 7th in their W-League season.

== Background ==
Nicola Williams was appointed the coach of the team, with Tanya Oxtoby captaining.

== Competitions ==
=== Overall record ===
| Competition | First match | Last match | Starting round | Final position | Record | | | | | | | |
| Competition | First match | Last match | Starting round | Final position | Pld | W | D | L | GF | GA | GD | Win % |
|---|---|---|---|---|---|---|---|---|---|---|---|---|
| W-League | 25 October 2008 | 28 December 2008 | Matchday 1 | 7th | 10 | 3 | 2 | 5 | 14 | 24 | −10 | 30.00 |
| Total | | | | | 10 | 3 | 2 | 5 | 14 | 24 | −10 | 30.00 |

Source: Competitions

=== W-League ===
==== League table ====
| Pos | Team | Pld | W | D | L | GF | GA | GD | Pts | Qualification |
|---|---|---|---|---|---|---|---|---|---|---|
| 1 | Queensland Roar (C) | 10 | 8 | 1 | 1 | 27 | 7 | +20 | 25 | Qualification to Finals series |
| 2 | Newcastle Jets | 10 | 5 | 2 | 3 | 17 | 12 | +5 | 17 | Qualification to Finals series |
| 3 | Canberra United | 10 | 4 | 4 | 2 | 14 | 10 | +4 | 16 | Qualification to Finals series |
| 4 | Sydney FC | 10 | 4 | 2 | 4 | 15 | 14 | +1 | 14 | Qualification to Finals series |
| 5 | Melbourne Victory | 10 | 4 | 0 | 6 | 13 | 13 | 0 | 12 | |
| 6 | Central Coast Mariners | 10 | 4 | 0 | 6 | 15 | 20 | −5 | 12 | |
| 7 | Perth Glory | 10 | 3 | 2 | 5 | 14 | 24 | −10 | 11 | |
| 8 | Adelaide United | 10 | 2 | 1 | 7 | 13 | 28 | −15 | 7 | |

Rules for classification: 1) points; 2) goal difference; 3) number of goals scored.
(C) Champions

==== Results summary ====
| Overall | | | | | | | | Home | | | | | | Away | | | | | |
| Pld | W | D | L | GF | GA | GD | Pts | W | D | L | GF | GA | GD | W | D | L | GF | GA | GD |
|---|---|---|---|---|---|---|---|---|---|---|---|---|---|---|---|---|---|---|---|
| 10 | 3 | 2 | 5 | 14 | 24 | −10 | 11 | 1 | 2 | 2 | 8 | 13 | −5 | 2 | 0 | 3 | 6 | 11 | −5 |

Source: worldfootball.net

==== Results by round ====
| Round | 1 | 2 | 3 | 4 | 5 | 6 | 7 | 8 | 9 | 10 |
|---|---|---|---|---|---|---|---|---|---|---|
| Ground | H | A | A | H | A | H | H | A | A | H |
| Result | L | L | L | W | L | D | L | W | W | D |
| Position | 8 | 8 | 8 | 8 | 8 | 8 | 8 | 7 | 6 | 7 |
| Points | 0 | 0 | 0 | 3 | 3 | 4 | 4 | 7 | 10 | 11 |

Source: worldfootball.net
A = Away; H = Home; W = Win; D = Draw; L = Loss

==== Matches ====
The league fixtures were announced on 1 October 2008.

Win Draw Loss

| 25 October 2008 1 | Perth Glory | 0–4 | Sydney FC | Perth |
| 13:00 AWST | | Report | Khamis 6', 8'; Small 39'; Garriock 61' | Stadium: Members Equity Stadium; Referee: Sara Hodson |

| 1 November 2008 2 | Central Coast Mariners | 3–1 | Perth Glory | Sydney |
| 18:00 AEDT | Camilleri 69'; Rollason 83', 90+1' (pen.) | Report | May 85' | Stadium: Parramatta Stadium; Attendance: 832; Referee: Amelia Morris |

| 8 November 2008 3 | Melbourne Victory | 3–0 | Perth Glory | Melbourne |
| 16:00 AEDT | Karp 47' (pen.); Hawkins 75' (o.g.); Bisby 82' | Report | | Stadium: Bob Jane Stadium; Referee: Kate Jacewicz |

| 15 November 2008 4 | Perth Glory | 3–2 | Adelaide United | Perth |
| 16:00 AWST | McCallum 25'; De Vanna 41'; Alagich 56' (o.g.) | Report | Black 90'; Cockayne 90+3' | Stadium: Members Equity Stadium; Referee: Prue Donohoe |

| 23 November 2008 5 | Newcastle Jets | 4–1 | Perth Glory | Newcastle |
| 15:00 AEDT | Pearce 17'; Gill 24'; Jones 27'; Neilson 76' | Report | Tabain 6' | Stadium: Wanderers Oval; Referee: Kate Jacewicz |

| 30 November 2008 6 | Perth Glory | 2–2 | Canberra United | Perth |
| 16:00 AWST | D'Ovidio 34'; De Vanna 54' | Report | Munoz 81'; Sykes 89' | Stadium: Members Equity Stadium; Attendance: 479; Referee: Lee Corey |

| 7 December 2008 7 | Perth Glory | 3–5 | Queensland Roar | Perth |
| 16:00 AWST | Kerr 7'; De Vanna 40'; Tabain 45+' | Report | Colthorpe 2'; Harch 49'; Kellond-Knight 57'; Lathma 89'; Beutel 90+3' | Stadium: Members Equity Stadium; Referee: Casey Reibelt |

| 13 December 2008 8 | Sydney FC | 0–1 | Perth Glory | Sydney |
| 16:00 AEDT | | Report | Tabain 64' | Stadium: Parramatta Stadium; Attendance: 300; Referee: Sara Hodson |

| 19 December 2008 9 | Adelaide United | 1–3 | Perth Glory | Adelaide |
| 19:30 ACDT | Scalzi 90+' | Report | Tabain 52'; McCallum 71'; D'Ovidio 86' | Stadium: Hindmarsh Stadium; Referee: Kirralee Gardener |

| 28 December 2008 10 | Perth Glory | 0–0 | Newcastle Jets | Perth |
| 15:00 AWST | | Report | | Stadium: Members Equity Stadium; Attendance: 693; Referee: Lee Corey |

== Statistics ==
=== Appearances and goals ===
| No. | Pos. | Player | Apps | Goals | Ref |
|---|---|---|---|---|---|
| 1 | GK | (Australia) Kate Stewart | 2 | 0 | |
| 2 | DF | (Australia) Stacey Learmont | 10 | 0 | |
| 3 | DF | (Wales) Carys Hawkins | 10 | 0 | |
| 4 | FW | (Australia) Sam Kerr | 7 | 1 | |
| 5 | MF | (Australia) Shannon May | 7 | 1 | |
| 6 | MF | (Australia) Katarina Jukic | 5 | 0 | |
| 7 | FW | (Australia) Ciara Conway | 7 | 0 | |
| 8 | DF | (Australia) Tanya Oxtoby | 10 | 0 | |
| 9 | MF | (England) Katy Coghlan | 4 | 0 | |
| 10 | MF | (Australia) Ella Mastrantonio | 7 | 0 | |
| 11 | FW | (Australia) Lisa De Vanna | 7 | 3 | |
| 12 | MF | (Australia) Dani Calautti | 10 | 0 | |
| 13 | MF | (Australia) Elisa D'Ovidio | 10 | 2 | |
| 14 | MF | (Australia) Collette McCallum | 10 | 2 | |
| 15 | DF | (Australia) Elle Semmens | 3 | 0 | |
| 16 | DF | (Australia) Rachael Smith | 3 | 0 | |
| 17 | MF | (Australia) Marianna Tabain | 8 | 4 | |
| 18 | MF | (Singapore) Shiya Lim | 1 | 0 | |
| 19 | DF | (Australia) Emily Dunn | 3 | 0 | |
| 20 | GK | (Australia) Maya Diederichsen | 3 | 0 | |
| 30 | GK | (Australia) Luisa Marzotto | 5 | 0 | |

Statistics accurate as of the end of the 2008–09 W-League season

- Coach: Nicola Williams
- Captain: Tanya Oxtoby

== Awards ==
=== W-League ===
| Award | Player | Ref. |
|---|---|---|
| 2008–09 Goal of the Year | Marianna Tabain | |
