= Inglewood Stadium =

Inglewood Stadium may refer to:

- Inglewood Stadium (Western Australia), a sporting facility currently used for soccer known as the Perth Plasterboard Centre Stadium under a sponsorship arrangement
- SoFi Stadium, a sports and entertainment district in Inglewood, California, United States
