= Jacynta Galabadaarachchi =

Australian soccer player (born 2001)

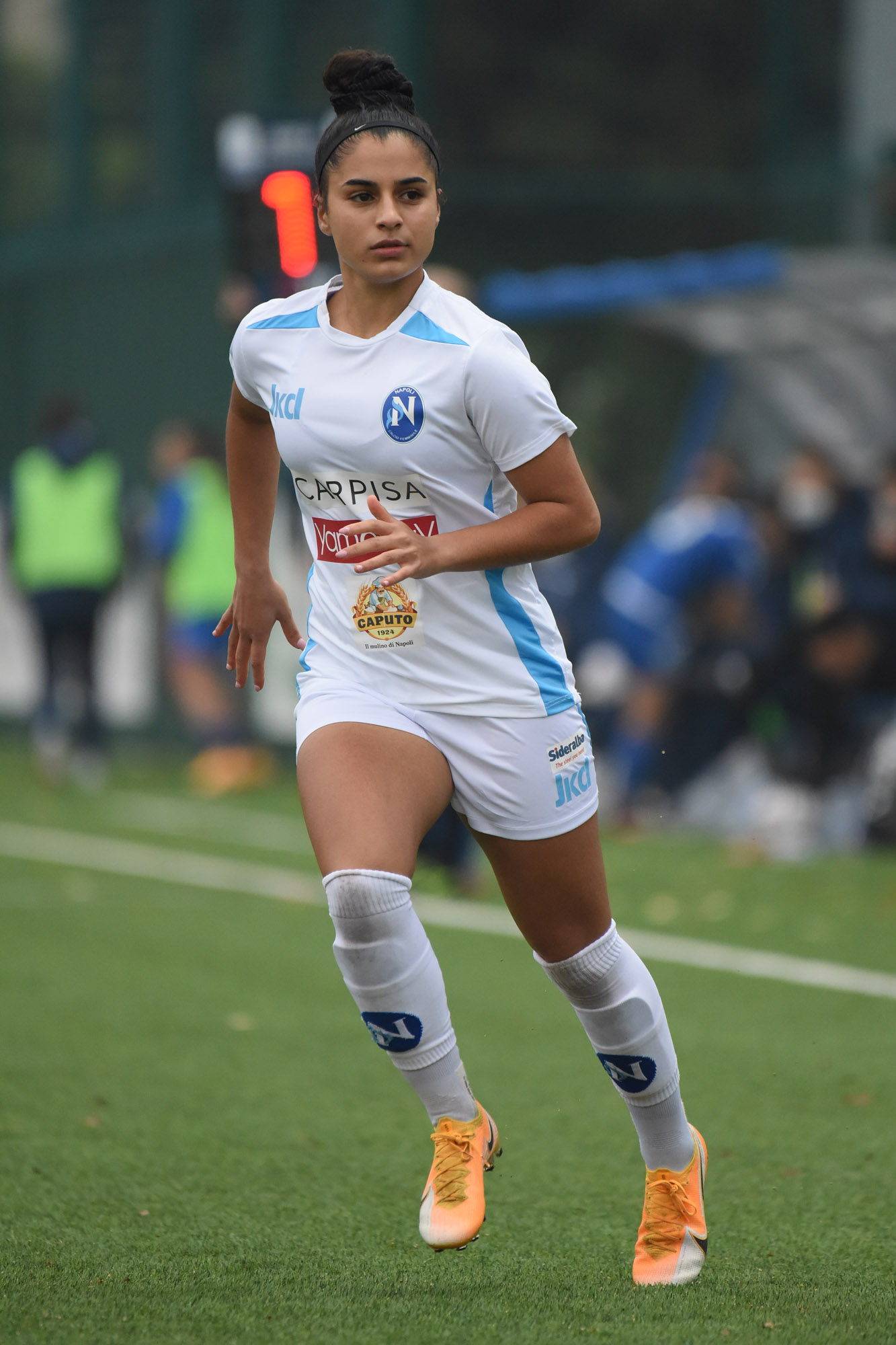
- Galabadaarachchi in 2020

Personal information
- Full name: Jacynta Prema de Nieva Galabadaarachchi
- Date of birth: 6 June 2001 (age 25)
- Place of birth: Melbourne, Victoria, Australia
- Height: 1.55 m (5 ft 1 in)
- Position: Forward

Team information
- Current team: Sassuolo
- Number: 28

Youth career
- Kingston City

Senior career*
Years	Team	Apps	(Gls)
2016–2017	Melbourne City	5	(0)
2018–2019	Perth Glory	4	(0)
2019–2020	West Ham United	11	(0)
2020–2021	Napoli	4	(0)
2021–2023	Celtic	25	(15)
2023–2025	Sporting CP	23	(3)
2025–	Sassuolo	14	(0)

International career^{‡}
2016–2018	Australia U17		
2018	Australia U20	1	(0)
2025–	Australia	2	(0)
- * Club domestic league appearances and goals as of 4 October 2026 ‡ National team caps and goals as of 10 July 2025

Jacynta Prema de Nieva Galabadaarachchi (Note: Sinhala: ජසින්තා ප්‍රේමා ද නීවා ගලබඩආරච්චි, pronounced [d͡ʒasin̪t̪a præːma da niːʋaː ɡaləbədəaːraʈ͡ʃːi]) (Latin American Spanish: [ˈpɾema ðe ˈnjeβa]; (Note: Pronunciation in Rioplatense Spanish.) born 6 June 2001), also known as Jacynta Gala, is an Australian professional soccer player who plays as a forward for Serie A Women club Sassuolo and the Australia women's national team.

== Early life ==
Galabadaarachchi began playing soccer at age five after watching her brother play. She was later invited to Manchester City W.F.C. Academy and spent eight weeks training with the team. At age 14, her request to play for an under-15 boys premier league team was denied by Football Federation Victoria; the decision was later overturned.

== Club career ==
=== Melbourne City, 2016–2017 ===
In October 2016 at age 15, Galabadaarachchi signed with Melbourne City for the 2016–17 season, and made five appearances for the club, playing primarily as a striker. After getting limited playing time at Melbourne City, Galabadaarachchi went to England and trained with various professional teams over there. Despite offers she was unable to sign a pro contract as she was under 18.

=== Perth Glory, 2018–2019 ===
Galabadaarachchi returned to Australia and signed with Perth Glory for the 2018–19 W-League season.

=== West Ham United, 2019–2020 ===
In July 2019, Galabadaarachchi secured a move to English FA WSL side West Ham United.

=== Napoli, 2020–2021 ===
Galabadaarachchi signed on loan with Italian team Napoli in September 2020.

=== Celtic, 2021–2023 ===
Galabadaarachchi signed for SWPL side Celtic in February 2021. She quickly became a fan favourite regularly scoring for the club. In July 2023, Celtic confirmed that Galabadaarachchi would leave the club.

=== Sporting CP, 2023–2025 ===
Galabadaarachchi signed for Portuguese team Sporting CP in July 2023.

=== Sassuolo, 2025– ===
In August 2025, Galabadaarachchi joined Italian club Sassuolo.

== International career ==
Galabadaarachchi is eligible to represent Australia, Sri Lanka (via her father), Argentina and Italy (both from her mother) in international football, and has represented the Australian Under-17 team.

In February 2017, she was called up for the Matildas for training camp ahead of the 2017 Algarve Cup. After being called up again by Australia in 2022, but not making her international debut, she announced in 2023 that she would instead commit to playing for Argentina. However, she again failed to debut for La Albiceleste, and was called up by Australia for the third time in mid 2025 for two friendlies against Slovenia in June.

She made her international debut for Australian on 5 July 2025 in the first friendly against Panama in Bunbury, Western Australia, coming on as a sub in the second half.

== Personal life ==
Galabadaarachchi is in a relationship with Swedish footballer Carl Starfelt.

== Career statistics ==
=== Club ===
As of 13 July 2020

Club	Season	League			National Cup (Note: Includes FA Cup)		League Cup (Note: Includes League Cup)		Continental (Note: Includes UEFA Women's Champions League)		Other (Note: Includes Supertaça de Portugal)		Total	
Club	Season	Division	Apps	Goals	Apps	Goals	Apps	Goals	Goals	Apps	Goals	Apps	Apps	Goals
Melbourne City	2016–17	W-League	5	0	—				—				5	0
Perth Glory	2018–19	W-League	4	0	—				—				4	0
West Ham United	2019–20	FA WSL	11	0	1	0	5	0	—				17	0
Napoli	2020–21	Serie A	4	0	0	0	0	0	—				4	0
Celtic	2020–21	SWPL 1	10	1	0	0	0	0	—				10	1
Celtic	2021–22	SWPL 1	23	3	2	0	3	1	—				28	4
Celtic	2022–23	SWPL 1	30	15	1	0	0	0	—				31	15
Celtic	Total		63	21	3	0	3	1	—				69	20
Sporting CP	2023–24	Campeonato Nacional Feminino	18	3	5	0	4	1	0	0	2	0	29	4
Sporting CP	2024–25	Campeonato Nacional Feminino	5	0	0	0	0	0	4	0	2	0	11	0
Sporting CP	Total		23	3	5	0	4	1	4	0	4	0	40	4
Career total			110	24	9	0	12	2	4	0	4	0	139	24

== Honours ==
Melbourne City

- W-League: 2016–17

Celtic

- Scottish Cup: 2022, 2023
- SWPL League Cup: 2021–22

Sporting

- Supertaça de Portugal: 2024

== See also ==
- Women's association football in Australia
