= 2018–19 Perth Glory FC (women) season =

Perth Glory W-League
2018–19 season
- Chairman: Tony Sage
- Manager: Bobby Despotovski
- Stadium: HBF Park; Dorrien Gardens
- W-League: 4th
- Top goalscorer: Sam Kerr (13 goals)
Home colours	Away colours

The 2018–19 Perth Glory FC W-League season was the club's eleventh season in the W-League.

== Players ==
=== Squad information ===
Updated October 27, 2018 Note: Flags indicate national team as defined under FIFA eligibility rules; some limited exceptions apply. Players may hold more than one non-FIFA nationality.

No.	Pos.	Nation	Player
1	GK	AUS	Eliza Campbell
2	DF	AUS	Sarah Carroll
3	DF	AUS	Kim Carroll
4	MF	USA	Alyssa Mautz
5	MF	AUS	Shannon May
6	MF	AUS	Abbey Meakins
7	MF	USA	Nikki Stanton
9	FW	USA	Rachel Hill
10	MF	AUS	Jacynta Galabadaarachchi
11	MF	AUS	Leticia McKenna
14	MF	AUS	Caitlin Doeglas

No.	Pos.	Nation	Player
15	MF	AUS	Alexia Moreno
17	FW	AUS	Liana Cook
18	FW	AUS	Isabella Foletta
20	FW	AUS	Sam Kerr (Captain)
21	GK	AUS	Morgan Aquino
22	FW	AUS	Abbey Green
23	GK	PHI	Stacey Cavill
24	DF	AUS	Natasha Rigby
25	DF	USA	Katie Naughton
—	MF	AUS	Hana Lowry
—	DF	AUS	Isabella Wallhead

=== Transfers in ===
No.	Pos.	Nat.	Name	Age	Moving from	Type	Transfer window	Ends	Transfer fee	Source
1	GK	(Australia)	Eliza Campbell	23	Adelaide United	Transfer	Pre-season			
10	MF	(Australia)	Jacynta Galabadaarachchi	17	unattached	Signed	Pre-season			
11	MF	(Australia)	Leticia McKenna	16	(Australia) Football West NTC	Signed	Pre-season			
4	MF	(United States)	Alyssa Mautz	29	(United States) Chicago Red Stars	Loan	Pre-season			
25	DF	(United States)	Katie Naughton	24	(United States) Chicago Red Stars	Loan	Pre-season			
17	FW	(Australia)	Liana Cook	18	(Australia) Football West NTC	Training scholarship	Mid-season			
18	FW	(Australia)	Isabella Foletta	18	(Australia) Football West NTC	Training scholarship	Mid-season			
22	FW	(Australia)	Abbey Green	16	(Australia) Football West NTC	Training scholarship	Mid-season			
	DF	(Australia)	Isabella Wallhead	15	(Australia) Football West NTC	Training scholarship	Mid-season			
	MF	(Australia)	Hana Lowry	15	(Australia) Football West NTC	Training scholarship	Mid-season			

=== Transfers out ===
No.	Pos.	Nat.	Name	Age	Moving to	Type	Transfer window	Transfer fee	Source
18	GK	(Australia)	Melissa Maizels	25	Canberra United	Transfer	Pre-season		
16	MF	(United States)	Amanda Frisbie	26	Sky Blue FC	Loan Return	Pre-season		

== W-League ==
=== League table ===
Pos	Team	Pld	W	D	L	GF	GA	GD	Pts	Qualification
1	Melbourne Victory	12	7	3	2	21	15	+6	24	Qualification to Finals series and 2019 AFC Women's Club Championship
2	Brisbane Roar	12	6	2	4	18	17	+1	20	Qualification to Finals series
3	Sydney FC (C)	12	6	1	5	28	19	+9	19	Qualification to Finals series
4	Perth Glory	12	5	4	3	28	20	+8	19	Qualification to Finals series
5	Melbourne City	12	6	1	5	20	15	+5	19	
6	Adelaide United	12	5	3	4	17	19	−2	18	
7	Newcastle Jets	12	5	1	6	18	21	−3	16	
8	Canberra United	12	3	4	5	13	18	−5	13	
9	Western Sydney Wanderers	12	1	1	10	11	30	−19	4	

Source: A-Leagues
Rules for classification: 1) points; 2) goal difference; 3) number of goals scored.
(C) Champions

=== Matches ===
Win Draw Loss

28 October 2018 1	Brisbane Roar	1–1	Perth Glory	Brisbane
	Pickett 88'	Report	Mautz 54'	Stadium: Suncorp Stadium; Attendance: 3,796; Referee: Rachael Mitchenson

4 November 2018 2	Canberra United	4–4	Perth Glory	Canberra
	Jane 7' (pen.), 77' (pen.); Mulaudzi 30'; Rojas 45+1'	Report	O'Sullivan 5' (o.g.); Mautz 82'; McKenna 87'; Corsie 90' (o.g.)	Stadium: McKellar Park; Attendance: 1,742; Referee: Lara Lee

17 November 2018 3	Perth Glory	3–0	Western Sydney Wanderers	Perth
	Hill 15', 57'; Kerr 42'	Report		Stadium: Dorrien Gardens; Attendance: 716; Referee: Rachel Mitchelson

25 November 2018 4	Perth Glory	5–2	Melbourne City	Perth
	Kerr 10', 52'; Hill 21'; Mautz 65', 90+4'	Report	Kellond-Knight 49', 69' (pen.)	Stadium: nib Stadium; Attendance: 2,358; Referee: Katie Patterson

6 December 2018 6	Adelaide United	2–2	Perth Glory	Adelaide
	Latsko 22', 79'	Report	Kerr 40', 45+2'	Stadium: Marden Sports Complex; Attendance: 1,007; Referee: Katie Patterson

15 December 2018 7	Perth Glory	2–2	Newcastle Jets	Perth
	McKenna 4'; Kerr 29' (pen.)	Report	Stengel 17', 18'	Stadium: Dorrien Gardens; Attendance: 652; Referee: Lara Lee

21 December 2018 8	Perth Glory	2–1	Sydney FC	Perth
	Kerr 47', 85'	Report	Kennedy 27'	Stadium: nib Stadium; Attendance: 1,179; Referee: Kate Jacewicz

28 December 2018 9	Melbourne Victory	2–1	Perth Glory	Melbourne
	Dowie 35', 83'	Report	Hill 90'	Stadium: AAMI Park; Attendance: 7,163; Referee: Rachel Mitchenson

3 January 2019 10	Perth Glory	1–0	Canberra United	Perth
	Kerr 85' (pen.)	Report		Stadium: Dorrien Gardens; Attendance: 838; Referee: Casey Reibelt

12 January 2019 11	Newcastle Jets	3–1	Perth Glory	Newcastle
	Wright 57'; Andrews 64'; Vine 90+2'	Report	Kerr 34'	Stadium: Newcastle Number 2 Sports Ground; Attendance: 1,876; Referee: Isabella Blaess

24 January 2019 13	Western Sydney Wanderers	1–5	Perth Glory	Sydney
	Khamis 27'	Report	Moreno 9'; Naughton 39'; Kerr 70', 81'; Hill 84'	Stadium: Marconi Stadium; Attendance: 951; Referee: Katie Patterson

1 February 2019 14	Perth Glory	1–2	Melbourne Victory	Perth
	Kerr 55'	Report	Nairn 17'; Gielnik 35'	Stadium: Dorrien Gardens; Attendance: 1,110; Referee: Georgia Ghirardello

==== Finals Series ====
10 February 2019 Semi-final	Melbourne Victory	2–4 (a.e.t.)	Perth Glory	Melbourne
14:00 AEDT	Nairn 2'; Maher 90+4'	Source	Kerr 74', 97', 107'; Hill 86'	Stadium: AAMI Park; Attendance: 8,599; Referee: Rachel Mitchenson

16 February 2019 Grand final	Sydney FC	4–2	Perth Glory	Sydney
16:30 AEDT	Huerta 6'; McCaskill 41', 61'; Logarzo 70'	Report	Kerr 23' (pen.); Mautz 68'	Stadium: Netstrata Jubilee Stadium; Attendance: 6,127; Referee: Kate Jacewicz

=== Results summary ===
Overall								Home						Away					
Pld	W	D	L	GF	GA	GD	Pts	W	D	L	GF	GA	GD	W	D	L	GF	GA	GD
12	5	4	3	28	20	+8	19	4	1	1	14	7	+7	1	3	2	14	13	+1

Last updated: February 2019, end of regular season.
Source: Competitive Matches

=== Results by round ===
Round	1	2	3	4	5	6	7	8	9	10	11	12	13	14
Ground	A	A	H	H	B	A	H	H	A	H	A	B	A	H
Result	D	D	W	W	✖	D	D	W	L	W	L	✖	W	L
Position	4	6	2	2	2	2	2	1	4	2	3	4	4	4

Updated to match(es) played on February 2019. Source:
A = Away; H = Home; B = Bye; W = Win; D = Draw; L = Loss
