= Jessica Dillon =

Australian football player (born 1995)

Personal information
- Full name: Jessica Dillon
- Date of birth: 17 January 1995 (age 31)
- Place of birth: Perth, Australia
- Position: Midfielder

Team information
- Current team: The Gap FC (NPL QLD)
- Number: 7

Youth career
- 2011–2012: QAS
- 2013: Eastern Suburbs

Senior career*
Years	Team	Apps	(Gls)
2013–2014	Perth Glory	7	(0)
2014	Toronto Lady Lynx		
2014– 2018	The Gap FC	73	(17)
2019	Moreton Bay United FC		
2020–	Lions FC		

International career
2011–2012	U17 Australian Team	3	(0)
- * Club domestic league appearances and goals as of 25 February 2014

Jessica Dillon (born 17 January 1995) is an Australian soccer player, who currently plays for Lions FC in the Women's National Premier League.

Dillon joined the Queensland Academy of Sport in 2011 after making the 2010 Westfield National Youth Championships All Star Team. After being named in the All Star Team, at the age of 16 Jessica was then selected in the Westfield Young Matildas Under 17s Squad. She competed in the 2011 AFC U16 Women's Championships held in China. The Westfield National U17 Women's team missed out on qualifying for the 2012 FIFA U17 Women's World Cup.

Following her selection into the National team she played for Perth Glory in the Australian W-League in the 2013/2014 season.

After Dillon's stint in the Westfield W-League she went to Canada where she played with Toronto Lady Lynx in the Canadian W-League. She would later play for The Gap back in Australia.
