= Ella Mastrantonio =

Australian soccer player

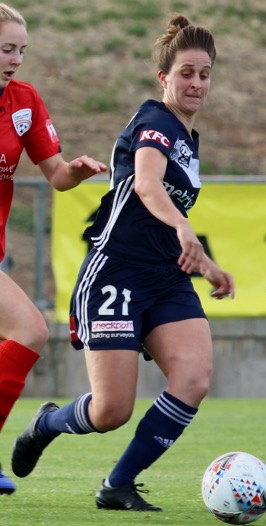
- Mastrantonio in 2018

Personal information
- Full name: Ella Jade Mastrantonio
- Date of birth: 22 January 1992 (age 34)
- Place of birth: Fremantle, Australia
- Height: 1.66 m (5 ft 5 in)
- Position: Central midfielder

Team information
- Current team: SKN St. Pölten
- Number: 15

Senior career*
Years	Team	Apps	(Gls)
2008–2010	Perth Glory	16	(0)
2010–2011	Melbourne Victory	11	(0)
2011–2014	Perth Glory	30	(0)
2014–2015	Melbourne Victory	16	(0)
2015–2016	Perth Glory	10	(0)
2018–2019	Melbourne Victory	9	(1)
2019–2020	Western Sydney Wanderers	11	(0)
2020–2021	Bristol City	15	(1)
2021	Lazio	8	(0)
2022	Pomigliano	9	(0)
2022–2023	Perth Glory	15	(0)
2023–	SKN St. Pölten	1	(0)

International career^{‡}
2007–2008	Australia U17	4	(0)
- Australia U20
2008–	Australia	7	(1)
- * Club domestic league appearances and goals as of 5 September 2023 ‡ National team caps and goals as of 12 July 2010

Ella Mastrantonio (born 22 January 1992) is an Australian midfielder currently playing for SKN St. Pölten. She has previously played for Perth Glory, Melbourne Victory, Bristol City, Lazio, and Pomigliano.

== Club career ==
=== Perth Glory and Melbourne Victory ===
Mastrantonio made her professional debut for Perth Glory during the 2009 season. She then played for them and for Melbourne Victory over eight seasons, including winning the 2013–14 W-League championship with Melbourne Victory.

=== Western Sydney Wanderers ===
In November 2019, Mastrantonio joined Western Sydney Wanderers.

=== Bristol City ===
On 30 June 2020, it was announced that Mastrantonio had joined Bristol City after spending over a decade playing in the Australian top-flight. She made her debut for the club in a 4–0 home loss to Everton in the FA WSL. Mastrantonio was released upon the expiration of her contract at the end of the 2020–21 FA WSL season.

=== Lazio ===
In July 2021, Mastrantonio signed a two-year contract with Italian club Lazio, following their promotion to the Serie A ahead of the 2021–22 season. She was the first Australian woman to join the club after consulting with the club's assistant coach Nicola Williams who had previously coached Perth Glory. Following poor form by the club, which included the dismissal of coach Carolina Morace who had recruited Mastrantonio, she departed the club in December 2021 to try to find another club in Europe to play for and to increase her chances for an international call-up.

=== Pomigliano ===
In January 2022, Mastrantonio joined Serie A club Pomigliano.

=== Return to Perth Glory ===
In July 2022, Mastrantonio returned to Australia, signing a two-year contract with Perth Glory for her fourth stint with the club.

=== SKN St. Pölten ===
In August 2023, Mastrantonio left Australia once more, signing with Austrian champions SKN St. Pölten.

== International career ==
Mastrantonio made her debut for Australia in June 2008 against Japan.

== International goals ==
No.	Date	Venue	Opponent	Score	Result	Competition
1.	13 October 2008	Thành Long Sports Centre, Ho Chi Minh City, Vietnam	Singapore	6–0	6–0	2008 AFF Women's Championship

== Career statistics ==
=== Club ===
As of 20 February 2021.

Appearances and goals by club, season and competition
Club	Season	League			League Cup		Total	
Club	Season	Division	Apps	Goals	Apps	Goals	Apps	Goals
Perth Glory	2009	W-League	8	0	0	0	8	0
Melbourne Victory	2010–11	W-League	11	0	0	0	11	0
Perth Glory	2011–12	W-League	10	0	0	0	10	0
Perth Glory	2012–13	W-League	12	0	0	0	12	0
Perth Glory	2013–14	W-League	8	0	0	0	8	0
Perth Glory	Total		30	0	0	0	30	0
Melbourne Victory	2013–14	W-League	3	0	0	0	3	0
Melbourne Victory	2014–15	W-League	13	0	0	0	13	0
Melbourne Victory	Total		16	0	0	0	16	0
Perth Glory	2015–16	W-League	10	0	0	0	10	0
Melbourne Victory	2018–19	W-League	9	1	0	0	9	0
Western Sydney Wanderers	2019–20	W-League	12	0	0	0	12	0
Bristol City	2020–21	FA WSL	15	1	4	0	19	0
Career total			106	2	3	0	109	1

== Honours ==
=== International ===
Australia

- AFF Women's Championship: 2008
