= Rosie Sutton =

Australian soccer player

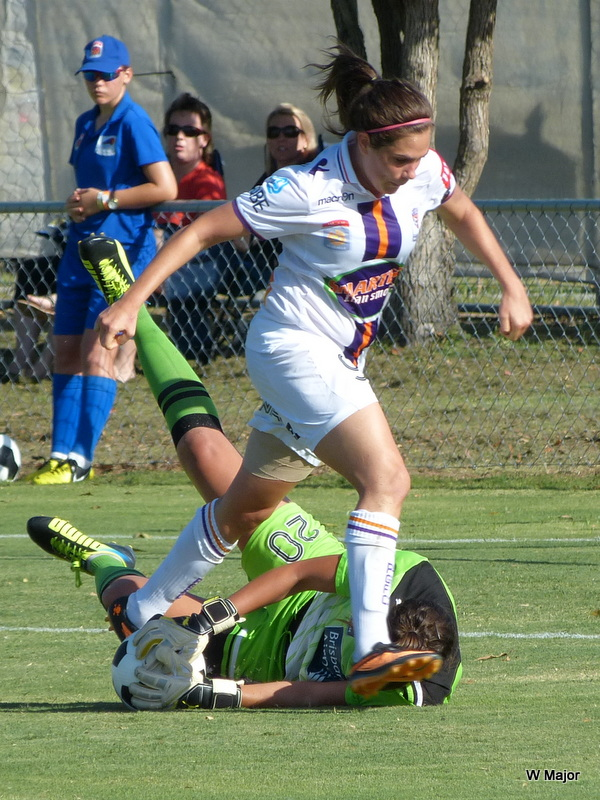
- Sutton playing for Perth Glory in 2014

Personal information
- Full name: Rosie Sutton
- Date of birth: 19 January 1990 (age 36)
- Place of birth: Tweed Heads, Australia
- Height: 1.67 m (5 ft 5 1/2 in)
- Position: Striker

Team information
- Current team: Brisbane Roar
- Number: 9

Senior career*
Years	Team	Apps	(Gls)
2012–2013	Perth Glory	12	(5)
2013	ÍBV	12	(2)
2013–2014	Perth Glory	10	(4)
2015–2016	Adelaide United	12	(5)
2016–2017	Perth Glory	14	(7)
2017–2018	Western Sydney Wanderers	6	(1)
2019–2020	Melbourne Victory	9	(1)
2020–	Brisbane Roar	4	(0)
- * Club domestic league appearances and goals as of 13 November 2020

Rosie Sutton (born 19 January 1990) is an Australian soccer player, who plays for Brisbane Roar in the Australian W-League. She has previously played for Perth Glory, Adelaide United, Western Sydney Wanderers, and Melbourne Victory in the Australian W-League as for ÍBV in the Icelandic Úrvalsdeild kvenna.

== Club career ==
=== Adelaide United ===
In 2015, Sutton joined Adelaide United after a stint with Queensland team Eastern Suburbs.

=== Melbourne Victory ===
After sitting out the 2018–19 season, Sutton joined Melbourne Victory in October 2019.

=== Brisbane Roar ===
In November 2020, Sutton joined Brisbane Roar ahead of the 2020–21 W-League season.
