= Tanya Oxtoby =

Australian soccer coach (born 1982)

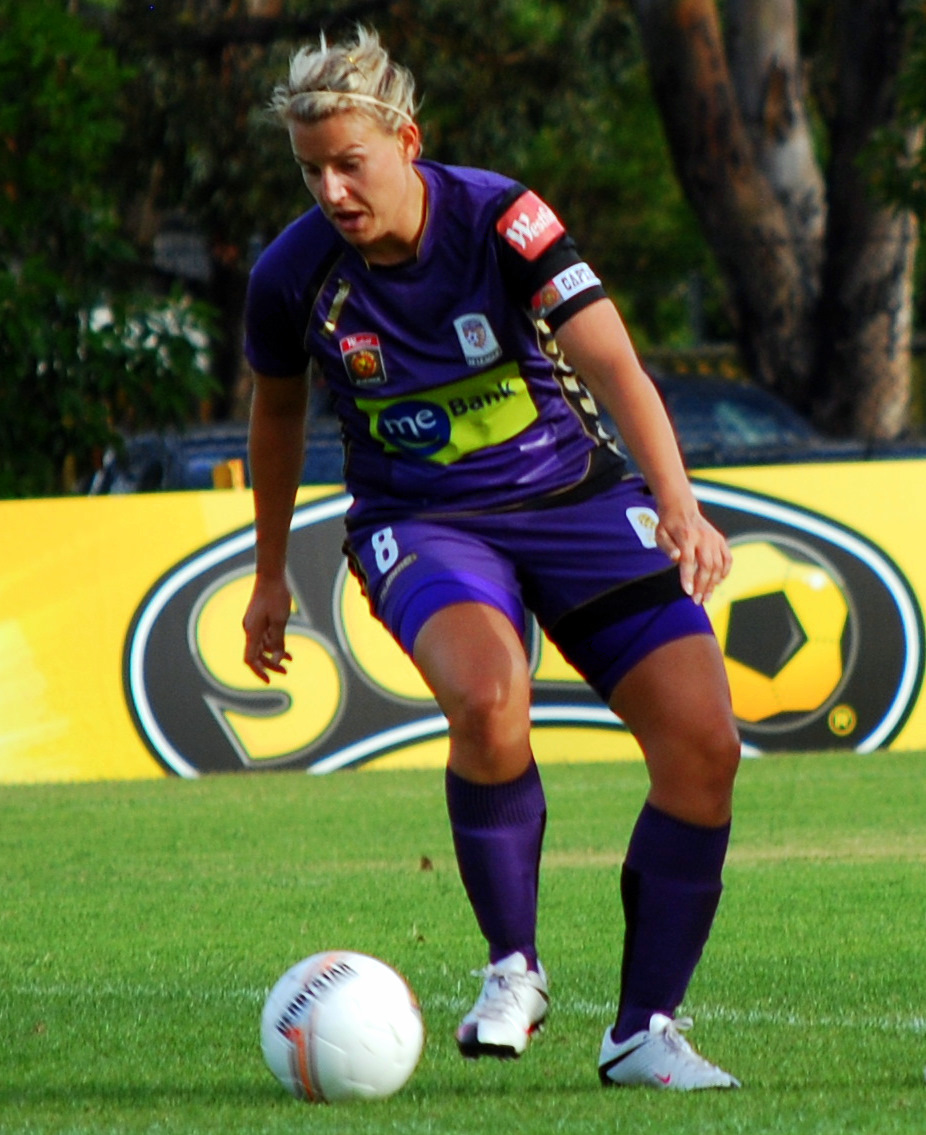
- Oxtoby with Perth Glory in 2010

Personal information
- Full name: Tanya Helen Oxtoby
- Date of birth: 15 June 1982 (age 44)
- Place of birth: Wickham, Australia
- Height: 1.68 m (5 ft 6 in)
- Position: Centre-back

Team information
- Current team: Newcastle United (manager)

Senior career*
Years	Team	Apps	(Gls)
2002–2003	Northern Redbacks		
2003–2004	Northern NSW Pride		
2004–2008	Western Waves		
2008–2012	Perth Glory	40	(0)
2012	Doncaster Rovers Belles	14	(0)
2012	Everton		
Total		54	(0)

Managerial career
- 2012–2014: Nottingham Forest
- 2014–2015: Perth Glory (assistant)
- 2014–2016: Australia U20 (assistant)
- 2016–2018: Birmingham City (assistant)
- 2018–2021: Bristol City
- 2021: Scotland (assistant)
- 2021–2023: Chelsea (assistant)
- 2023–2025: Northern Ireland
- 2025–: Newcastle United
- * Club domestic league appearances and goals

Tanya Helen Oxtoby (born 15 June 1982) is an Australian soccer coach and former player, who is currently the manager of Women's Super League 2 club Newcastle United.

A centre-back during her playing career, she signed for FA WSL club Doncaster Rovers Belles in February 2012, after four seasons playing for Perth Glory in the Australian W-League. In July 2012, she agreed to manage Nottingham Forest Ladies, in addition to her playing duties with Doncaster. After finishing her playing career with Everton, she worked full-time as a coach with Notts County Ladies, as their Development Team Manager.

After returning home to Australia in 2015 to the club she captained, Oxtoby became the assistant coach for Perth Glory Women, helping guide the Glory to their only Premiers Plate, winning the league, as well as their first ever grand final appearance. During this period, she also set up Tanya Oxtoby Football Coaching, her own coaching and mentoring business for female footballers and coaches. She also spent 18 months working with the Australian under 20 team, as an assistant coach and video analyst.

Following a successful stint back in Australia, Oxtoby was offered a role as Head Coach and Director of Development at Notts County Ladies in early 2016, a role coupled with first team assistant coach duties. Oxtoby became the Head of Women's Football and Futsal at the University of Nottingham, to oversee the entire development pathway for Notts County Ladies. In 2016, Oxtoby was recruited by Birmingham City Ladies to become an assistant coach with the first team in the Women's Super League. From 2018 to 2021, she was the manager of Bristol City, and then served as an assistant coach with the Scotland women's national football team and Chelsea.

== Playing career ==
Born in Wickham, Western Australia, Oxtoby began playing as an eight-year-old in the Pilbara town of Wickham, initially playing in a team coached by her father.

Between 1995 and 1999, she attended the Soccer Excellence Program at John Curtin College of the Arts. In 1999, Oxtoby was selected for the Australian Under–19 Schoolgirls team but did not make the touring squad to England.

In 2005, Oxtoby was appointed captain of the Western Waves in the Australian Women's National Soccer League.

In 2008, she was appointed captain of Perth Glory's women's team in the W-League. She was one of only a few players of Indigenous descent to play in the W-League, and the first indigenous player to captain her side.

In February 2009, she was named best player for the Glory, winning the Most Glorious Women's Player award. Oxtoby collected the same award for her performances in the 2011 season. Overall, she played 40 matches for the Glory between 2008 and 2012.

Oxtoby, who has dual English–Australian citizenship, joined Glory teammate Katie Holtham at Doncaster Rovers Belles for the 2012 FA WSL season.

== Coaching career ==
In 2007, Oxtoby was appointed assistant coach of the Football West National Training Centre. During 2008, she was appointed Western Australia women's Under-15 coach.

In July 2012, Oxtoby was appointed manager and head coach of English FA Women's Premier League Northern Division club Nottingham Forest, a role she combined with playing for Doncaster in the FA WSL. In August 2013, Oxtoby accepted a coaching role with the reserve team of WSL club Notts County Ladies, before she returned to Australia.

After returning home to Australia in 2014 to the club she captained, Oxtoby become the assistant coach for Perth Glory Women. She helped guide the Glory to the Premiers plate winning the league, and their first ever grand final appearance. During this period, she also set up Tanya Oxtoby Football Coaching, her own coaching and mentoring business for female footballers. She also spent 18 months working with the Australian under 20 team, as an assistant coach and video analyst.

Following a successful stint with back in Australia, she then moved back to Notts County Ladies in early 2016 as their Director of Development and first team assistant coach, and become Head of Women's Football and Futsal at the University of Nottingham.

In 2017, Oxtoby was recruited by Birmingham City Ladies to become an assistant coach with a focus on out of possession with the first team in the Women's Super League. Oxtoby was then recruited at the Talent Identification and Transition Manager for English Colleges Women's National Team, a position she held for two years. She also served as lifestyle advisor for ParalympicsGB's Goalball team.

In July 2018, Bristol City Women named Oxtoby its new manager. In her first season with Bristol City, she won two manager of the month awards and took them to a record breaking points tally finishing in 6th place in the Women's Super League, with the most notable results being draws against Chelsea and Manchester City. She managed to ensure Bristol's safety in the WSL in the following season, despite having the lowest budget of all the teams competing within the league, as well as a crippling injury list. She is renowned as an exceptional player developer, identifying young English talent and providing them the opportunity to excel within her provided environment and earn game time at the highest level. The likes of Ebony Salmon, Poppy Pattinson, Katie Robinson and Aimee Palmer are among some of the best young talent to come through under her supervision. In August 2021, she stepped down as manager following her maternity leave, and was succeeded by Lauren Smith.

Following a short stint with the Scotland women's national football team as an assistant coach, Oxtoby joined Women's Super League club Chelsea in the same role in September 2021.

On 1 September 2023, Oxtoby was officially appointed as the new manager of the Northern Ireland women's national team, having signed a four-year contract with the Irish FA.

On 22 November 2025 Oxtoby was officially appointed as manager of Women's Super League 2 side Newcastle United. Following a 1–0 win against Southampton in her first game in charge, she said of the squad "The players want to learn, and they want to get better, and as a coach, that's all you can ask for. They're all asking good questions and wanting to understand what we're going after as a group, so from that perspective, it's very pleasing. That energy has been really good."

== Personal life ==
As well as being a UEFA A licence coach, Oxtoby also holds a Diploma in Football Management from the League Managers Association (LMA), and is a qualified sports psychologist.

Oxtoby is married to Alice Kempski, National Development Manager at the FA. Their son Albie was born in 2021. She has spoken openly about the difficulties of combining a managerial career with motherhood and was the first professional coach in England to take maternity leave, with Matt Beard taking over coaching duties at Bristol City until the end of the season.

== See also ==
- Foreign players in the FA WSL
