= Inglewood Stadium (Western Australia) =

Sporting facility in Perth, Western Australia

- Interactive map of Inglewood Stadium
- Former names: Inglewood Oval (1960s/70s), Kiev Sports Ground (1980s/90s), National Stadium (2002–2004); Clipsal Stadium (2007–2009); 6PR Stadium(2010–2012); Intiga Stadium (2013–2014); Inglewood Stadium (2015–2016), Perth Plasterboard Centre Stadium (2017–2018)
- Location: Inglewood, Western Australia
- Coordinates: 31.916470°S 115.879111°E
- Owner: City of Stirling
- Capacity: 5,536
- Surface: Grass
- Scoreboard: Manual

Tenants
- Inglewood United (1963–present); Perth Glory FC (Youth) (former); Perth Glory FC (W-League) (former)
- Inglewood Stadium (Western Australia) (Perth)

Inglewood Stadium, also known as Walter Road Reserve, is a sporting facility in Inglewood, Western Australia, currently used for soccer.

It is currently known as the Perth Plasterboard Centre Stadium under a sponsorship arrangement.

It has been previously known as Inglewood Oval, Kiev Sports Park and, under former sponsorship arrangements, National Stadium, Clipsal Stadium, 6PR Stadium and Intiga Stadium.

== Usage ==
Inglewood Stadium is used primarily by Inglewood United FC, who compete in the National Premier Leagues Western Australia. Inglewood have been based at the ground since 1963.

The ground has previously been used by Perth Glory FC Youth and Perth Glory Women, in the A-League National Youth League and W-League respectively.

Inglewood Stadium is surrounded by a series of football pitches used by junior and senior teams who compete in Football West competitions.
