= Katie Holtham =

English footballer

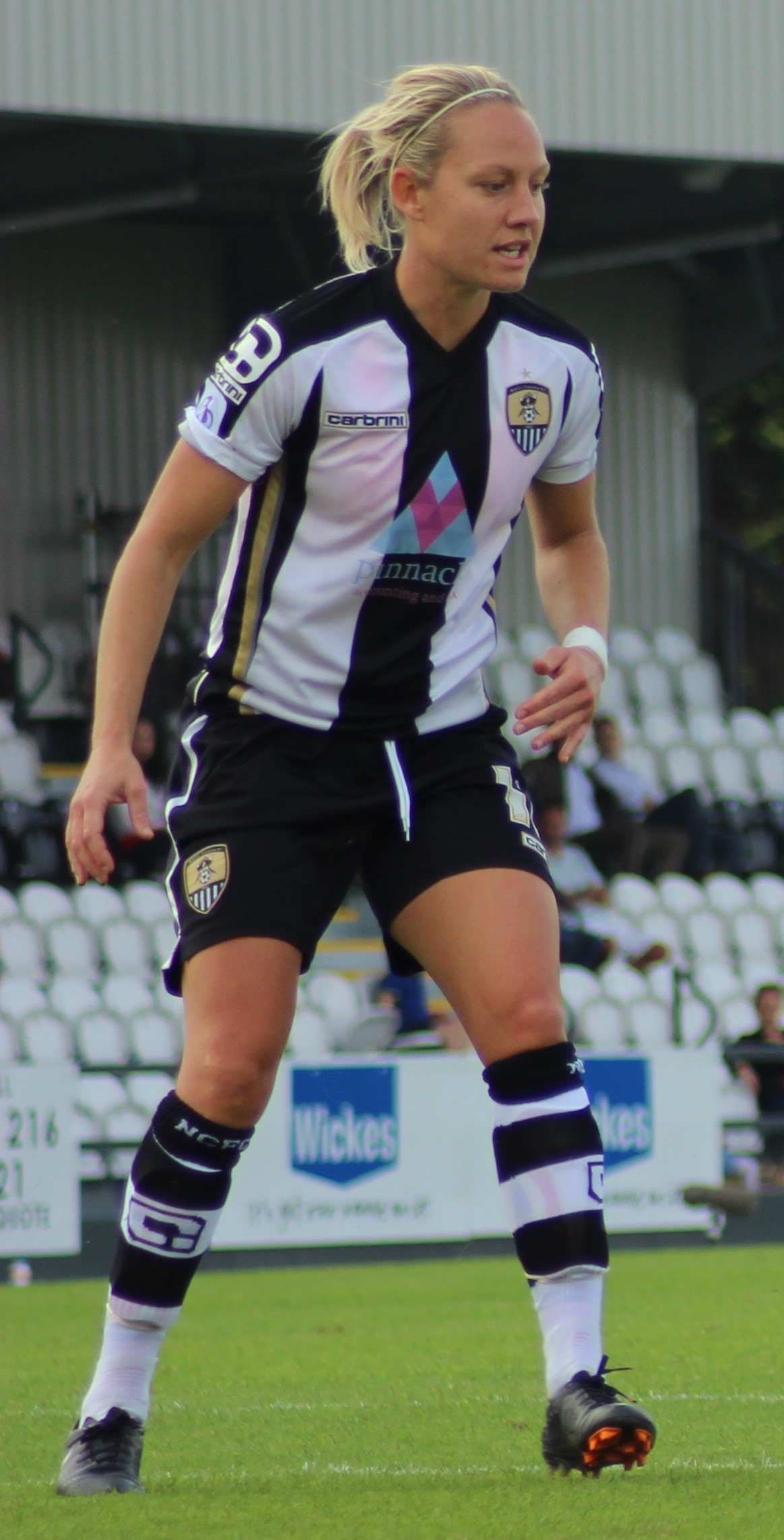
- Holtham playing for Notts County Ladies in 2014

Personal information
- Full name: Katie Ann Holtham
- Date of birth: 9 April 1986 (age 40)
- Place of birth: Nottingham, England
- Height: 5 ft 6 in (1.68 m)
- Positions: Centre back; defensive midfielder

Youth career
- West Bridgford Colts

Senior career*
Years	Team	Apps	(Gls)
2001–2004	Lincoln City		
2004–2006	Bristol Rovers		
2006–2007	Charlton Athletic		
2007–2010	Leeds Carnegie		
2010	Buffalo Flash	7	(3)
2011–2012	Doncaster Rovers Belles	26	(1)
2011–2012	→ Perth Glory (loan)	9	(1)
2013	Chelsea	13	(0)
2014	Notts County	8	(0)
2014–2015	Adelaide United	12	(0)
2015–2016	Perth Glory	10	(0)

International career^{‡}
2005	England U19		
2008	England U23		
- * Club domestic league appearances and goals as of 31 October 2016 ‡ National team caps and goals as of 30 January 2014

Katie Ann Holtham (born 9 April 1986) is an English footballer who last played as a midfielder for Australian W-League club Perth Glory. Holtham's manager at former club Leeds Carnegie, Rick Passmoor, described her as: "strong, athletic and a good box to box midfield player."

== Club career ==
Holtham attended West Bridgford School and was said to have shone in football from an early age. She started playing her club football with West Bridgford Colts alongside English cricketer and Women's Ashes winner Jenny Gunn. She also played for Notts County's Centre of Excellence, but due to age restrictions had to stop playing in 'mixed teams'. To overcome this problem her dad set up West Bridgford Colts Girls.

Holtham advanced to playing for Lincoln City in the FA Women's Premier League Northern Division, then signed for Bristol Rovers in 2004. After becoming captain of the 'Gas Girls' Holtham signed for Charlton Athletic in 2006.

In her first season Charlton were beaten 4–1 by quadruple-winning Arsenal in the final of the FA Women's Cup. This was despite Holtham opening the scoring after two minutes, before a record crowd of 24,529 at the City Ground in her home town of Nottingham.

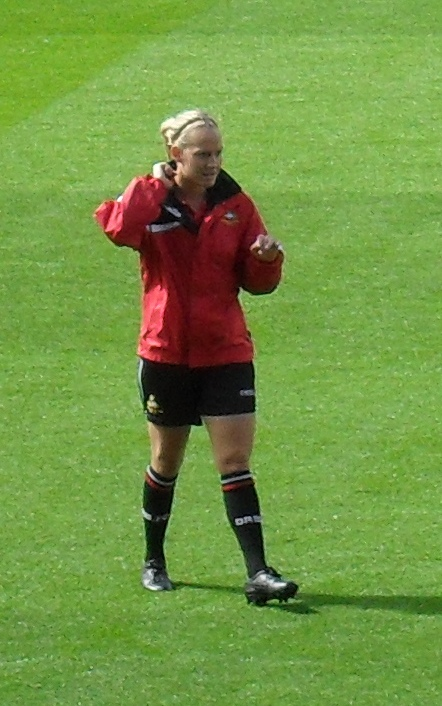
Holtham at Doncaster in August 2011

Holtham joined Leeds Carnegie that summer when Charlton Athletic FC scrapped their women's team after being relegated from the FA Premier League. In her first season at Leeds Carnegie she returned to Nottingham for the FA Women's Cup final, but again lost out 4–1 to Arsenal. She scored in a 3–1 Premier League Cup final win over Everton on 11 February 2010, to help Leeds Carnegie win their first major silverware.

With Leeds Carnegie's future uncertain, Holtham departed to play the 2010 summer season with professional W-League club Buffalo Flash. She scored three goals in seven matches as the Flash stayed unbeaten and won the league.

In November 2010 Holtham signed for Doncaster Rovers Belles ahead of their inaugural FA WSL campaign. She was awarded the club captaincy and finished the WSL season playing as a central defender. In October 2011 Holtham moved to Australian W-League outfit Perth Glory. She captured the club Players' Player of the Year award after making nine appearances for Perth, in central defence and then in midfield.

Holtham returned to captain The Belles in the 2012 FA WSL, but rejected a contract extension at the end of the season. A transfer to Chelsea Ladies was announced in January 2013. A year later Holtham moved again, returning to Nottingham to sign for Notts County, who were managed by her former Leeds boss Rick Passmoor.

Holtham joined Adelaide United in September 2014 for the 2014 season.

== International career ==
Holtham represented England at U17, U19, U21 and U23 level. She captained the U19s to the European Championship finals in Hungary in 2005. She has also been named in the senior squad on multiple occasions, without playing in any games.

== Personal life ==
Holtham attended the National Player Development Centre at Loughborough University, studying sports science. In 2014, she was employed as a physiotherapist in the Nottingham Forest F.C. Under-21s Squad and Academy.

Sporting positions
Preceded by Vicky Exley	Doncaster Rovers Belles captain 2011–2012	Succeeded by Leandra Little
