= Katarina Jukic =

Australian soccer player

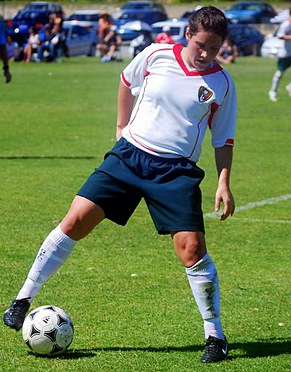
- Jukic playing for East Fremantle in 2010

Personal information
- Date of birth: 23 November 1989 (age 36)
- Place of birth: Perth, Western Australia, Australia
- Height: 1.63 m (5 ft 4 in)
- Positions: Midfielder; striker

Youth career
- FW NTC

Senior career*
Years	Team	Apps	(Gls)
2008–2010	Perth Glory	9	(0)
2011–2012	Perth Glory	10	(2)
2013–2015	Perth Glory	0	(0)
2018	Queen's Park FC		
2019–2021	Perth Glory	19	(1)
- * Club domestic league appearances and goals as of 19 January 2020

Katarina Jukic (born 23 November 1989) is an Australian football (soccer) player who played for Australian W-League team Perth Glory, and for Murdoch University Melville in the Women's NPL. She is the sister of Western Knights player Andrija Jukic.

In October 2020, Jukic gained attention for a goal scored while playing for Murdoch University Melville; she performed a rabona to score a goal from outside of the penalty area.

Jukic departed Perth Glory ahead of the 2021–22 A-League Women season.

== Honours ==
Personal honours

In both 2017 and 2018, she was awarded the Women's Premier Best Female Player.
