= Perth Glory FC (women) =

Australian women's soccer club

- Full name: Perth Glory Football Club
- Nickname: The Glory Girls
- Short name: PGFC
- Founded: 2008; 18 years ago
- Ground: Sam Kerr Football Centre (Queens Park)
- Capacity: 4,000
- Head Coach: Stephen Peters
- League: A-League Women
- 2025–26: 8th of 11
- Website: http://www.perthglory.com.au/

Perth Glory Football Club is an Australian professional association football club based in Perth, Western Australia. It competes in the country's premier women's competition, A-League Women. The team was established in 2008, with the founding of the new league.

== History ==
=== Establishment ===
After Australia reached the quarter-finals of the 2007 FIFA Women's World Cup for the first time, head coach Tom Sermanni felt the establishment of a professional league was vital for continuing the development of players. Perth Glory was one of eight teams included in the establishment of the league the following year by Football Federation Australia.

== Ownership and team management ==
During the team's inaugural season, the women's team was managed by Nicola Williams who improved to be a top–four performing side in the second half of the season. In 2010, Jamie Harnwell was named head coach and led the team to second and first place finishes and a first-time trip to the finals. In July 2015, former A-League striker Bobby Despotovski was named head coach with former Matilda and Perth Glory captain Collette McCallum as assistant coach. After five years as a coach, Despotovski stepped down in November 2020 and was replaced by Alexander Epakis a few weeks later. Despite signing a two-year contract extension in August 2023, Epakis left the coaching role for personal reasons in June 2024.

In July 2023, A-Leagues administrators the Australian Professional Leagues appointed receivers to manage the sale of Perth Glory's licence, after accepting the immediate return of the club's licence from the previous owner Tony Sage.

In October 2023, Australian Professional Leagues confirmed new owners had been found for the club, which was to be Robert Brij and John Nekic. However in November 2023, it was reported that the sale would be terminated.

In February 2024, Pelligra Group was confirmed as the new owners of the club.

== Players ==
=== Current squad ===
As of 3 November 2026

Note: Flags indicate national team as defined under FIFA eligibility rules; some limited exceptions apply. Players may hold more than one non-FIFA nationality.

No.	Pos.	Nation	Player
1	GK	AUS	Teresa Morrissey
2	DF	AUS	Mischa Anderson
3	DF	AUS	Ella Buchanan
4	MF	AUS	Daisy McAllister
5	DF	AUS	Baxter Thew
6	MF	PHI	Emma Tovar (Captain)
7	MF	WAL	Megan Wynne
8	MF	AUS	Georgia Cassidy
9	FW	NZL	Maggie Jenkins
10	MF	AUS	Susan Phonsongkham
11	MF	AUS	Ella Abdul-Massih
12	FW	AUS	Bronte Trew
14	MF	AUS	Charli Wainwright

No.	Pos.	Nation	Player
16	MF	AUS	Olivia Wood
17	FW	USA	Rola Badawiya
18	FW	AUS	Theodora Mouithys (youth development)
19	MF	AUS	Clancy Westaway
20	DF	AUS	Sakura Leong (scholarship)
21	GK	AUS	Alyssa Dall'Oste
22	DF	AUS	Hayley Muir (youth development)
23	MF	AUS	Isobel Dalton (captain)
24	DF	AUS	Julia Sardo
25	FW	AUS	Ella Lincoln
26	DF	AUS	Chloe Murray (scholarship)
29	DF	NGR	Onyinyechi Zogg
30	GK	AUS	Daisy McGreadie-Cole (youth development)

== Season-by-season record ==
Chart of yearly table positions for Perth Glory in A-League Women

Season	Regular season	Finals
2008–09	5th	–
2009	6th	–
2010–11	5th	–
2011–12	6th	–
2012–13	2nd	Semi-finalist
2013–14	5th	–
2014	1st	Grand final runners-up
2015–16	8th	–
2016–17	2nd	Grand final runners-up
2017–18	6th	–
2018–19	4th	Grand final runners-up
2019–20	7th	–
2020–21	9th	–
2021–22	5th	–
2022–23	6th	–

== Honours ==
=== Domestic ===
- W-League
  - Winners (1): 2014
  - Runners-up (2): 2012–13, 2016–17
- W-League Grand Finals
  - Runners-up (3): 2014, 2017, 2019

== See also ==
- List of top-division football clubs in AFC countries
- Women's soccer in Australia
- W-League records and statistics
- Australia women's national soccer team
