= Tony Sage =

Australian businessman

- Born: 26 June 1960 (age 66)
- Website: tonysage.com.au

Antony William Paul Sage, known as Tony Sage (born 26 June 1960), is a Western Australian businessman who was also the owner of A-League football club Perth Glory.

== Biography ==
Born in Gloucester, England, on 26 June 1960, Sage moved with his parents to Australia in 1969, residing first in Adelaide, then Melbourne and Sydney before again moving to New Zealand with his mother and father in 1975. In 1978, he went to Western Australia and enrolled at Churchlands College (now part of the Edith Cowan University) in Perth. He graduated with a Bachelor of Business (Accounting and Finance) in 1980. He later became a Fellow of the Society of Certified Practising Accountants, a Chartered Accountant, and a Fellow of the Taxation Institute of Australia. He has three children.

== Corporate interests ==
=== Mining and resources ===
In 1997 Sage formed the consulting firm Okewood Pty Ltd to finance and manage mining and exploration companies in Australia and overseas. Sage came to corporate prominence in 2008, when he sold a magnetite project called Mt Anketell to the Metallurgical Corporation of China for $400 million after buying it 18 months earlier for just $20m. In 2009 he asset flipped CopperCo from receivership and after converting its debt to equity, sold the CopperCo assets for approximately $300m. The sale of African Iron Ltd to Exarro for approximately $375m took place in 2012.

In October 2014 Sage became Executive Chairman of Cape Lambert Resources Ltd, and Non Executive Chairman of Cauldron Energy Ltd and Fe Ltd. He is a non-executive director of Kupang Resources Ltd, Caeneus Minerals Ltd, and International Petroleum Limited and Managing Director of his consultancy business Okewood Pty Ltd.

From 2012 to February 2014, Cape Lambert was the subject of continuing investigations by the Australian Taxation Office. The result was a $96m assessment issued to his flagship company, Cape Lambert Resources Ltd, plunging the share value by 75%. After two years of intense scrutiny, the ATO settled for $2.4m.

=== Perth Glory ===
In 2007 Sage purchased a part ownership stake in A-League football club Perth Glory, and fully took over the club in 2009 after buying out co-owner Brett McKeon. In 2020 he began the process of selling part of the club to the London Football Exchange, a football-based Cryptocurrency exchange, for a price of $30 million. The deal fell apart after the founder of LFE was revealed to be using a fake identity, and was actually convicted fraudster James Abbass Biniaz.

Sage stepped down as owner of the club in 2023. The club was issued a breach notice & Sage was stripped of the license due to financial turmoil that included requiring loans from the central administration of the league to pay staff & player wages.

=== Fashion and media ===
Sage was part owner of the Perth Fashion Festival until it went into administration and ceased operations in 2019. He was also the owner and publisher of the defunct Kurv fashion magazine.
