= List of Melbourne Victory FC (women) players =

This is a list of Melbourne Victory FC W-League players both past and present.

== A ==
- (Australia) Laura Alleway
- (Australia) Rachel Alonso
- (Australia) Meghan Archer

== B ==
- (Australia) Melissa Barbieri
- (United States) Lauren Barnes
- (Australia) Enza Barilla
- (Australia) Louisa Bisby
- (Australia) Ashley Brown

== C ==
- (Australia) Stephanie Catley
- (United States) Georgia Cloepfil

== D ==
- (Australia) Brianna Davey
- (Australia) Lisa De Vanna
- (Australia) Daniela Digiammarco
- (Australia) Cassandra Dimovski

== E ==
- (Australia) Tiffany Eliadis

== F ==
- (Wales) Jessica Fishlock
- (United States) Kendall Fletcher
- (Australia) Alisha Foote
- (Australia) Caitlin Friend

== G ==
- (Australia) Katrina Gorry
- (Australia) Sarah Groenewald

== H ==
- (Australia) Monnique Hansen Kofoed
- (Australia) Sophie Hogben
- (Australia) Ursula Hughson
- (Australia) Emily Hulbert
- (Australia) Jessica Humble

== J ==
- (Australia) Amy Jackson
- (United States) Danielle Johnson

== K ==
- (Australia) Tal Karp
- (Turkey) Gulcan Koca
- (Australia) Georgie Koutrouvelis
- (Australia) Selin Kuralay

== L ==
- (Sweden) Petra Larsson

== M ==
- (Australia) Melissa Maizels
- (Australia) Rita Mankowska
- (Australia) Bethany Mason-Jones
- (Australia) Ella Mastrantonio
- (United States) Jessica McDonald
- (Australia) Kara Mowbray

== N ==
- (United States) Christine Nairn
- (Australia) Deanna Niceski
- (Australia) Bronwyn Nutley

== O ==
- (New Zealand) Marlies Oostdam

== P ==
- (Bosnia and Herzegovina) Vedrana Popovic

== R ==
- (Australia) Sarah Richardson
- (Australia) Maika Ruyter-Hooley

== S ==
- (United States) Julianne Sitch
- (Australia) Laura Spiranovic
- (New Zealand) Rebekah Stott

== T ==
- (Australia) Stephanie Tanti
- (England) Jodie Taylor
- (New Zealand) Rebecca Tegg
- (Canada) Katie Thorlakson
- (Canada) Brittany Timko

== V ==
- (Australia) Snez Veljanovska
- (Australia) Jacqueline Vogt
