= 2009 Melbourne Victory FC (women) season =

Melbourne Victory (W-League)
2009 season
- Chairman: Geoff Lord
- Head Coach: Matt Shepherd
- W-League: 5th
- W-League Finals: DNQ
- Top goalscorer: Katrina Gorry; Katie Thorlakson (2 each)
- Biggest win: 2–0 vs. Perth Glory (H) (3 October 2009); W-League; 2–0 vs. Adelaide United (A) (24 October 2009); W-League
- Biggest defeat: 0–2 vs. Canberra United (A) (24 October 2009); W-League; 0–2 vs. Central Coast Mariners (A) (21 November 2009); W-League; 0–2 vs. Perth Glory (A) (5 December 2009); W-League
Home colours	Away colours

The 2009 season was Melbourne Victory Football Club (W-League)'s second season, in the W-League. Melbourne Victory finished 5th in their W-League season.

== Players ==
Note: Flags indicate national team as defined under FIFA eligibility rules; some limited exceptions apply. Players may hold more than one non-FIFA nationality.

No.	Pos.	Nation	Player
1	GK	AUS	Melissa Barbieri
2	DF	AUS	Vedrana Popovic
3	DF	NZL	Marlies Oostdam
4	MF	AUS	Tal Karp (captain)
5	DF	AUS	Laura Alleway
6	DF	AUS	Maika Ruyter-Hooley
7	MF	AUS	Sarah Groenewald
8	FW	CAN	Katie Thorlakson
9	MF	AUS	Stephanie Catley
10	FW	AUS	Deanna Niceski
11	MF	USA	Julianne Sitch

No.	Pos.	Nation	Player
12	MF	AUS	Monnique Hansen Kofoed
13	MF	AUS	Katrina Gorry
14	MF	AUS	Selin Kuralay
15	DF	AUS	Jessica Humble
16	MF	AUS	Gulcan Koca
17	FW	AUS	Caitlin Friend
18	MF	AUS	Ursula Hughson
19	MF	AUS	Enza Barilla
20	GK	AUS	Nicole Paul
21	MF	AUS	Kara Mowbray

== Transfers ==
=== Transfers in ===
No.	Position	Name	From	Type/fee	Date	Ref.
2	DF	Vedrana Popovic	Brisbane Roar	Free transfer	23 September 2009	
8	FW	(Canada) Katie Thorlakson	(Canada) Vancouver Whitecaps	Free transfer	23 September 2009	
9	MF	Steph Catley	(Australia) Sandringham	Free transfer	23 September 2009	
11	MF	(United States) Julianne Sitch	(United States) Sky Blue FC	Free transfer	23 September 2009	
12	MF	Monnique Hansen Kofoed	(Australia) Queensland Academy of Sport	Free transfer	23 September 2009	
13	MF	Katrina Gorry	(Australia) Mt Gravatt	Free transfer	23 September 2009	
15	DF	Jessica Humble	(Australia) Box Hill Inter	Free transfer	23 September 2009	
16	MF	Gulcan Koca	(Australia) FFV NTC	Free transfer	23 September 2009	
17	FW	Caitlin Friend	(Australia) FFV NTC	Free transfer	23 September 2009	

=== Transfers out ===
- Meghan Archer
- Louisa Bisby
- Rebecca Tegg
- Stephanie Tanti
- Brittany Timko
- Sophie Hogben
- Deanna Niceski
- Daniela Digiammarco
- Bronwyn Nutley
- Alisha Foote

== Competitions ==
=== Overall record ===
Competition	First match	Last match	Starting round	Final position	Record							
Competition	First match	Last match	Starting round	Final position	Pld	W	D	L	GF	GA	GD	Win %
W-League	3 October 2009	5 December 2009	Matchday 1	5th	10	4	2	4	9	10	−1	40.00
Total					10	4	2	4	9	10	−1	40.00

Source: Competitions

=== W-League ===
==== League table ====
Pos	Team	Pld	W	D	L	GF	GA	GD	Pts	Qualification
1	Sydney FC (C)	10	7	2	1	25	10	+15	23	Qualification to Finals series
2	Central Coast Mariners	10	7	1	2	24	7	+17	22	Qualification to Finals series
3	Brisbane Roar	10	6	3	1	24	7	+17	21	Qualification to Finals series
4	Canberra United	10	4	2	4	17	12	+5	14	Qualification to Finals series
5	Melbourne Victory	10	4	2	4	9	10	−1	14	
6	Perth Glory	10	4	1	5	11	22	−11	13	
7	Adelaide United	10	0	3	7	7	31	−24	3	
8	Newcastle Jets	10	0	2	8	7	25	−18	2	

Source: au.soccerway.com
Rules for classification: 1) points; 2) goal difference; 3) number of goals scored.
(C) Champions

==== Results summary ====
Overall								Home						Away					
Pld	W	D	L	GF	GA	GD	Pts	W	D	L	GF	GA	GD	W	D	L	GF	GA	GD
10	4	2	4	9	10	−1	14	3	1	1	6	3	+3	1	1	3	3	7	−4

Source: worldfootball.net

==== Results by round ====
Round	1	2	3	4	5	6	7	8	9	10
Ground	H	H	A	A	H	H	A	A	H	A
Result	W	L	W	L	W	D	D	L	W	L
Position	3	3	3	5	4	4	4	5	4	5
Points	3	3	6	6	9	10	11	11	14	14

Source: worldfootball.net
A = Away; H = Home; W = Win; D = Draw; L = Loss

==== Matches ====
Win Draw Loss

3 October 2009 1	Melbourne Victory	2–0	Perth Glory	Melbourne
16:45 AEST	Barilla 34'; Thorlakson 71'	Report		Stadium: Etihad Stadium; Referee: Jacqui Melksham

10 October 2009 2	Melbourne Victory	0–1	Brisbane Roar	Melbourne
18:00 AEDT		Report	Beaumont 83'	Stadium: Epping Stadium; Referee: Catherine Hofmann

17 October 2009 3	Adelaide United	0–2	Melbourne Victory	Adelaide
14:30 ACDT		Report	Gorry 29'; Kurulay 81'	Stadium: Hindmarsh Stadium; Referee: Lee Corey

24 October 2009 4	Canberra United	2–0	Melbourne Victory	Canberra
17:00 AEDT	Tseng 27', 48'	Report		Stadium: McKellar Park; Attendance: 856; Referee: Sara Hodson

31 October 2009 5	Melbourne Victory	2–1	Newcastle Jets	Melbourne
14:00 AEDT	Gorry 45'; Niceski 90+'	Report	Cartwright 62'	Stadium: Veneto Club; Referee: Rebecca Durcau
Note: Match originally located for Bob Jane Stadium, but relocated due to poor surface conditions. It was relocated to Veneto Club.

7 November 2009 6	Melbourne Victory	1–1	Sydney FC	Shepparton
19:00 AEDT	Sitch 62'	Report	Ruyter-Hooley 90+5'	Stadium: Deakin Reserve; Referee: Catherine Hofmann

14 November 2009 7	Brisbane Roar	1–1	Melbourne Victory	Brisbane
18:00 AEST	Polkinghorne 49'	Report	Mowbray 88'	Stadium: Ballymore Stadium; Attendance: 1,473; Referee: Casey Reibelt

21 November 2009 8	Central Coast Mariners	2–0	Melbourne Victory	Sydney
17:00 AEDT	Heyman 27', 52'	Report		Stadium: Leichhardt Oval; Referee: Kirralee Gardener

28 November 2009 9	Melbourne Victory	1–0	Canberra United	Melbourne
15:00 AEDT	Thorlakson 89'	Report		Stadium: Olympic Park; Referee: Catherine Hofmann

5 December 2009 10	Perth Glory	2–0	Melbourne Victory	Perth
17:15 AWST	De Vanna 81'; Gill 87'	Report		Stadium: Clipsal Stadium; Referee: Lee Corey

== Statistics ==
=== Appearances and goals ===
Last updated 18 October 2009

No.	Pos.	Name	W-League		W-League Finals		Total		Discipline	
No.	Pos.	Name	Apps	Goals	Apps	Goals	Apps	Goals	Yellow card	Red card
1	GK	(Australia) Melissa Barbieri	3	0	0	0	3	0	0	0
2	DF	(Australia) Vedrana Popovic	3	0	0	0	3	0	0	0
3	DF	(New Zealand) Marlies Oostdam	3	0	0	0	3	0	0	0
4	MF	(Australia) Tal Karp	3	0	0	0	3	0	0	0
5	DF	(Australia) Laura Alleway	3	0	0	0	3	0	0	0
6	DF	(Australia) Maika Ruyter-Hooley	3	0	0	0	3	0	0	0
7	MF	(Australia) Sarah Groenewald	2	0	0	0	2	0	0	0
8	FW	(Canada) Katie Thorlakson	3	1	0	0	3	1	0	0
9	MF	(Australia) Stephanie Catley	1	0	0	0	1	0	0	0
10	FW	(Australia) Deanna Niceski	0	0	0	0	0	0	0	0
11	MF	(United States) Julianne Sitch	3	0	0	0	3	0	1	0
12	MF	(Australia) Monnique Hansen Kofoed	3	0	0	0	3	0	0	0
13	MF	(Australia) Katrina Gorry	3	1	0	0	3	1	1	0
14	MF	(Australia) Selin Kuralay	2	1	0	0	2	1	2	1
15	DF	(Australia) Jessica Humble	0	0	0	0	0	0	0	0
16	MF	(Australia) Gulcan Koca	0	0	0	0	0	0	0	0
17	FW	(Australia) Caitlin Friend	0	0	0	0	0	0	0	0
18	MF	(Australia) Ursula Hughson	0	0	0	0	0	0	0	0
19	MF	(Australia) Enza Barilla	3	1	0	0	3	1	0	0
20	GK	(Australia) Nicole Paul	0	0	0	0	0	0	0	0
21	MF	(Australia) Kara Mowbray	3	0	0	0	3	0	0	0
