= 2008–09 Melbourne Victory FC (women) season =

Melbourne Victory (W-League)
2008–09 season
- Chairman: Geoff Lord
- Head Coach: Matt Shepherd
- W-League: 5th
- W-League Finals: DNQ
- Top goalscorer: Marlies Oostdam; Sarah Groenewald; Brittany Timko (2 each)
- Biggest win: 3–0 vs. Perth Glory (H) (8 November 2008); W-League; 3–0 vs. Adelaide United (A) (29 November 2008); W-League
- Biggest defeat: 0–2 vs. Queensland Roar (A) (22 November 2008); W-League; 1–3 vs. Queensland Roar (H) (13 December 2008); W-League; 0–2 vs. Central Coast Mariners (A) (27 December 2008); W-League
Home colours	Away colours

The 2008–09 season was Melbourne Victory Football Club (W-League)'s first season, in the newly formed women's league in Australia the W-League. Melbourne Victory finished 5th in their W-League season.

== Players ==
Note: Flags indicate national team as defined under FIFA eligibility rules; some limited exceptions apply. Players may hold more than one non-FIFA nationality.

No.	Pos.	Nation	Player
1	GK	AUS	Melissa Barbieri
2	MF	AUS	Meghan Archer
3	DF	NZL	Marlies Oostdam
4	MF	AUS	Tal Karp (captain)
5	DF	AUS	Laura Alleway
6	DF	AUS	Maika Ruyter-Hooley
7	MF	AUS	Sarah Groenewald
8	MF	AUS	Louisa Bisby
9	FW	NZL	Rebecca Tegg
10	MF	AUS	Stephanie Tanti

No.	Pos.	Nation	Player
11	FW	CAN	Brittany Timko
12	MF	AUS	Sophie Hogben
13	FW	AUS	Deanna Niceski
14	MF	AUS	Selin Kuralay
15	DF	AUS	Daniela Digiammarco
16	DF	AUS	Bronwyn Nutley
17	FW	AUS	Alisha Foote
18	MF	AUS	Ursula Hughson
19	MF	AUS	Enza Barilla
20	GK	AUS	Nicole Paul

== Transfers ==
=== Transfers in ===
No.	Position	Name	From	Type/fee	Date	Ref.
1	GK	Melissa Barbieri	Free agent	Free transfer	8 August 2008	
2	DF	Meghan Archer	Free agent	Free transfer	14 October 2008	
3	DF	(New Zealand) Marlies Oostdam	Free agent	Free transfer	14 October 2008	
4	MF	Tal Karp	Free agent	Free transfer	14 October 2008	
5	DF	Laura Alleway	Free agent	Free transfer	14 October 2008	
6	DF	Maika Ruyter-Hooley	Free agent	Free transfer	14 October 2008	
7	MF	Sarah Groenewald	Free agent	Free transfer	14 October 2008	
8	MF	(Australia) Louisa Bisby	Free agent	Free transfer	14 October 2008	
9	FW	(New Zealand) Rebecca Tegg	Free agent	Free transfer	14 October 2008	
10	MF	Stephanie Tanti	Free agent	Free transfer	14 October 2008	
11	FW	(Canada) Brittany Timko	Free agent	Free transfer	14 October 2008	
12	MF	Sophie Hogben	Free agent	Free transfer	14 October 2008	
13	FW	Deanna Niceski	Free agent	Free transfer	14 October 2008	
14	MF	Selin Kuralay	Free agent	Free transfer	14 October 2008	
15	DF	Daniela Digiammarco	Free agent	Free transfer	14 October 2008	
16	DF	Bronwyn Nutley	Free agent	Free transfer	14 October 2008	
17	FW	Alisha Foote	Free agent	Free transfer	14 October 2008	
18	MF	Ursula Hughson	Free agent	Free transfer	14 October 2008	
19	MF	Enza Barilla	Free agent	Free transfer	14 October 2008	
20	GK	Nicole Paul	Free agent	Free transfer	14 October 2008	

== Competitions ==
=== Overall record ===
Competition	First match	Last match	Starting round	Final position	Record							
Competition	First match	Last match	Starting round	Final position	Pld	W	D	L	GF	GA	GD	Win %
W-League	25 October 2008	27 December 2008	Matchday 1	5th	10	4	0	6	13	13	+0	40.00
Total					10	4	0	6	13	13	+0	40.00

Source: Competitions

=== W-League ===
==== League table ====
Pos	Team	Pld	W	D	L	GF	GA	GD	Pts	Qualification
1	Queensland Roar (C)	10	8	1	1	27	7	+20	25	Qualification to Finals series
2	Newcastle Jets	10	5	2	3	17	12	+5	17	Qualification to Finals series
3	Canberra United	10	4	4	2	14	10	+4	16	Qualification to Finals series
4	Sydney FC	10	4	2	4	15	14	+1	14	Qualification to Finals series
5	Melbourne Victory	10	4	0	6	13	13	0	12	
6	Central Coast Mariners	10	4	0	6	15	20	−5	12	
7	Perth Glory	10	3	2	5	14	24	−10	11	
8	Adelaide United	10	2	1	7	13	28	−15	7	

Rules for classification: 1) points; 2) goal difference; 3) number of goals scored.
(C) Champions

==== Results summary ====
Overall								Home						Away					
Pld	W	D	L	GF	GA	GD	Pts	W	D	L	GF	GA	GD	W	D	L	GF	GA	GD
10	4	0	6	13	13	0	12	3	0	2	7	4	+3	1	0	4	6	9	−3

Source: worldfootball.net

==== Results by round ====
Round	1	2	3	4	5	6	7	8	9	10
Ground	H	A	H	H	A	A	H	H	A	A
Result	W	L	W	L	L	W	W	L	L	L
Position	3	3	2	3	6	4	2	3	4	5
Points	3	3	6	6	6	9	12	12	12	12

Source: worldfootball.net
A = Away; H = Home; W = Win; D = Draw; L = Loss

==== Matches ====
The league fixtures were announced on 1 October 2008.

Win Draw Loss

25 October 2008 1	Melbourne Victory	2–0	Central Coast Mariners	Melbourne
16:00 AEDT	Oostdam 52'; Tegg 60'	Report		Stadium: Telstra Dome; Attendance: 2,000; Referee: Lee Corey

1 November 2008 2	Sydney FC	2–1	Melbourne Victory	Sydney
16:00 AEDT	Bolger 55'; Khamis 82'	Report	Groenewald 24'	Stadium: Parramatta Stadium; Referee: Jacqui Melksham

8 November 2008 3	Melbourne Victory	3–0	Perth Glory	Melbourne
16:00 AEDT	Karp 47' (pen.); Hawkins 75' (o.g.); Bisby 82'	Report		Stadium: Bob Jane Stadium; Referee: Kate Jacewicz

15 November 2008 4	Melbourne Victory	0–1	Canberra United	Melbourne
19:00 AEDT		Report	McDonnell 24'	Stadium: Bob Jane Stadium; Attendance: 700~; Referee: Casey Reibelt

22 November 2008 5	Queensland Roar	2–0	Melbourne Victory	Brisbane
17:00 AEST	Beutel 33'; Butt 57'	Report		Stadium: Ballymore Stadium; Referee: Lee Corey
Note: Match originally located for Spencer Park, but relocated due to lightning. It was relocated to Ballymore Stadium.

29 November 2008 6	Adelaide United	0–3	Melbourne Victory	Adelaide
14:30 ACDT		Report	Kuralay 36', 71'; Digiammarco 64'	Stadium: Hindmarsh Stadium; Referee: Prue Donohoe

6 December 2008 7	Melbourne Victory	1–0	Newcastle Jets	Melbourne
19:00 AEDT	Timko 82'	Report		Stadium: Epping Stadium; Referee: Sara Hodson

13 December 2008 8	Melbourne Victory	1–3	Queensland Roar	Melbourne
16:00 AEDT	Timko 26'	Report	Beutel 10'; Ferguson 23'; Butt 55'	Stadium: Bob Jane Stadium; Referee: Kate Jacewicz

20 December 2008 9	Canberra United	3–2	Melbourne Victory	Canberra
18:00 AEDT	Brush 35'; Mowbray 83'; Chapman 90+3'	Report	Groenewald 82'; Oostdam 85'	Stadium: McKellar Park; Attendance: 1,152; Referee: Lee Corey

27 December 2008 10	Central Coast Mariners	2–0	Melbourne Victory	Sydney
16:00 AEDT	Kingsley 87'; O'Reilly 90+2'	Report		Stadium: Parramatta Stadium; Attendance: 795; Referee: Kate Jacewicz

== Leading scorers ==
The leading goal scores from the regular season.

Total	Pos	Player		Goals per Round									
Total	Pos	Player		1	2	3	4	5	6	7	8	9	10
2	DF	(New Zealand)	Marlies Oostdam	1								1	
2	MF	(Australia)	Sarah Groenewald		1							1	
2	FW	(Canada)	Brittany Timko							1	1		
1	FW	(New Zealand)	Rebecca Tegg	1									
1	MF	(Australia)	Tal Karp			1							
1	MF	(Australia)	Louisa Bisby			1							
1	MF	(Australia)	Selin Kuralay						1				
1	DF	(Australia)	Daniela Digiammarco						1				

A goal was scored from a penalty kick

== Milestones ==
First game = 2–0 win home V Central Coast Mariners
Largest win = 3–0 win home V Perth Glory & away V Adelaide United
Largest loss = 3–1 loss home V Brisbane Roar
