= List of Melbourne Victory FC (women) seasons =

Chart of yearly table positions for Melbourne Victory in A-League Women

Melbourne Victory FC is a women's association football club based at the Home of The Matildas with occasional matches played at the Melbourne Rectangular Stadium. The club was formed in 2008 as the first Victorian member admitted into the W-League in the 2008/09 W-League Season. The club has won the A-League Women Premiership one time, the A-League Women Championship three times, and has competed in the AFC Women's Club Championship on one occasion.

== Key ==
Key to colours and symbols:

1st or W	Winners
2nd or RU	Runners-up
3rd	Third
♦	Top scorer in division (excluding finals)

Key to league record:

- Season = The year and article of the season
- Pos = Final position
- Pld = Games played
- W = Games won
- D = Games drawn
- L = Games lost
- GF = Goals scored
- GA = Goals against
- Pts = Points

Key to League finals and AFC competitions:

- GS = Group Stage
- EF = Elimination Final
- SF = Semi Final
- PF = Preliminary Final
- RU = Runner Up
- W = Winners

== Seasons ==
As of 24 April 2025

Results of league and AFC competitions by season
Season	Division	P	W	D	L	GF	GA	GD	Pts	Pos	Finals	Competition	Result	Name	Goals	ref
Season	League										Finals	Other / Asia		Top goalscorer		ref
2008–09	W-League	10	4	0	6	13	13	0	12	5th	DNQ	—	—	Marlies Oostdam Sarah Groenewald Brittany Timko	2	
2009	W-League	10	4	2	4	9	10	-1	14	5th	DNQ	—	—	Katie Thorlakson	2	
2010-11	W-League	10	4	3	3	12	11	+1	15	4th	SF	—	—	Jodie Taylor	4	
2011-12	W-League	10	5	2	3	21	9	+12	17	4th	SF	—	—	Jodie Taylor	8	
2012-13	W-League	12	7	2	3	26	14	+12	23	3rd	RU	—	—	Jessica McDonald	7	
2013-14	W-League	12	7	2	3	23	12	+11	23	3rd	W	—	—	Caitlin Friend Lisa De Vanna	7	
2014	W-League	12	6	2	4	26	15	+11	20	2nd	SF	—	—	Racheal Quigley	8	
2015-16	W-League	12	2	1	9	10	28	-18	7	9th	DNQ	—	—	Laura Spiranovic MelindaJ Barbieri	2	
2016-17	W-League	12	2	3	7	17	28	-11	9	9th	DNQ	—	—	Natasha Dowie	9	
2017-18	W-League	12	3	2	7	15	19	-4	11	7th	DNQ	—	—	Natasha Dowie	5	
2018-19	W-League	12	7	3	2	21	15	+6	24	1st	SF	—	—	Natasha Dowie	9	
2019-20	W-League	12	7	2	3	24	14	+10	23	2nd	SF	AFC Women's Club Championship	GS	Natasha Dowie	7♦	
2020-21	W-League	12	7	2	3	25	14	+11	23	3rd	W	—	—	Melina Ayres Kyra Cooney-Cross Catherine Zimmerman	5	
2021-22	A League Women	14	7	3	4	26	22	+4	24	4th	W	—	—	Catherine Zimmerman	6	
2022-23	A League Women	18	7	8	3	29	22	+7	29	4th	PF	—	—	Melina Ayres	9	
2023-24	A League Women	22	10	6	6	44	29	+15	36	4th	EF	—	—	Rachel Lowe	12	
2024–25	A League Women	23	16	5	2	42	21	+21	53	2nd	RU	—	—	Emily Gielnik	13	
