= 2015–16 Melbourne Victory FC (women) season =

8th season in existence of Melbourne Victory FC (women)

Melbourne Victory (women)
2015–16 season
- Chairman: Anthony Di Pietro
- Head Coach: Dave Edmondson
- W-League: 9th
- W-League Finals: DNQ
- Top goalscorer: Natasha Dowie (3)
- Biggest win: 3–1 vs. Perth Glory (A) (28 November 2015); W-League
- Biggest defeat: 0–4 vs. Adelaide United (H) (8 November 2015); W-League vs. Melbourne City (H) (6 December 2015); W-League vs. Brisbane Roar (A) (10 January 2016); W-League
Home colours	Away colours

The 2015–16 season was Melbourne Victory Football Club (women)'s eighth season in the W-League. Melbourne Victory finished 9th in their W-League season.

== Players ==
Note: Flags indicate national team as defined under FIFA eligibility rules; some limited exceptions apply. Players may hold more than one non-FIFA nationality.

No.	Pos.	Nation	Player
1	GK	AUS	Cassandra Dimovski
2	DF	AUS	Alex Natoli
3	DF	USA	Brooke Elby
4	MF	AUS	Melissa Taranto
5	FW	NZL	Briar Palmer
6	DF	AUS	Annabel Martin
7	DF	AUS	Enza Barilla
8	MF	USA	Jamie Pollock
9	FW	AUS	Laura Spiranovic
10	MF	USA	Christine Nairn
11	MF	AUS	MelindaJ Barbieri

No.	Pos.	Nation	Player
12	FW	AUS	Whitney Knight
13	DF	AUS	Thea Slatyer
14	FW	AUS	Selin Kuralay
15	MF	AUS	Adriana Taranto
16	FW	AUS	Hayley Raso
17	MF	TUR	Gülcan Koca
18	DF	AUS	Jessica Pitts
20	GK	AUS	Melissa Barbieri
26	MF	AUS	Cindy Lay
28	DF	AUS	Sky Jensen
30	GK	AUS	Teresa Morrissey

== Transfers and contracts ==
=== Transfers in ===
No.	Position	Player	Transferred from	Type/fee	Date	Ref.
3	DF	(United States) Brooke Elby	(United States) North Carolina Tar Heels	Free transfer	4 October 2015	
4	MF	Melissa Taranto	(Australia) FFV NTC	Free transfer	4 October 2015	
5	FW	(New Zealand) Briar Palmer	(Australia) Ashburton United	Free transfer	4 October 2015	
6	DF	Annabel Martin	(Australia) FFV NTC	Free transfer	4 October 2015	
8	MF	(United States) Jamie Pollock	(Australia) South Melbourne	Free transfer	4 October 2015	
11	MF	MelindaJ Barbieri	(Australia) FFV NTC	Free transfer	4 October 2015	
12	FW	Whitney Knight	(Australia) FFV NTC	Free transfer	4 October 2015	
13	DF	Thea Slatyer	Retirement	Free transfer	4 October 2015	
14	FW	Selin Kuralay	Retirement	Free transfer	4 October 2015	
15	MF	Adriana Taranto	(Australia) FFV NTC	Free transfer	4 October 2015	
18	DF	Jessica Pitts	(Australia) Bundoora United	Free transfer	4 October 2015	
20	GK	Melissa Barbieri	Adelaide United	Free transfer	4 October 2015	
16	FW	Hayley Raso	(United States) Washington Spirit	Free transfer	8 October 2015	
—	FW	(United States) Georgia Cloepfil	(Australia) Ashburton United	Free transfer	30 October 2015	
26	MF	Cindy Lay	Unattached	Free transfer	30 October 2015	
27	FW	Natasha Dowie	(England) Liverpool	Loan	15 November 2015	

=== Transfers out ===
No.	Position	Player	Transferred to	Type/fee	Date	Ref.
9	FW	Racheal Quigley	(Australia) Bulleen Lions	Free transfer	31 March 2015	
11	FW	Lisa De Vanna	Melbourne City	Free transfer	10 July 2015	
2	DF	Hannah Brewer	(Australia) Valentine Phoenix	Free transfer	18 August 2015	
1	GK	Brianna Davey	Melbourne City	Free transfer	20 August 2015	
16	MF	Beattie Goad	Melbourne City	Free transfer	4 September 2015	
15	DF	Emma Checker	Canberra United	Free transfer	14 September 2015	
7	DF	Steph Catley	(United States) Portland Thorns	Loan return	17 September 2015	
13	DF	Alexandra Gummer	Adelaide United	Free transfer	26 September 2015	
8	MF	Amy Jackson	Melbourne City	Free transfer	30 September 2015	
6	DF	Gema Simon	Newcastle Jets	Free transfer	7 October 2015	
12	MF	Ella Mastrantonio	Perth Glory	Free transfer	13 October 2015	
—	FW	Jessica Au	(Australia) Bundoora United	Free transfer	17 October 2015	
5	DF	(United States) Lauren Barnes	(United States) Seattle Reign	Loan return	17 October 2015	
14	MF	Tiffany Eliadis	(Australia) South Melbourne	Free transfer	17 October 2015	
18	DF	(United States) Elli Reed	(United States) Seattle Reign	Free transfer	17 October 2015	
29	FW	Caitlin Friend	(Australia) Bulleen Lions	Free transfer	17 October 2015	
3	DF	(United States) Brooke Elby	Unattached	Free transfer	30 October 2015	
—	FW	(United States) Georgia Cloepfil	Unattached	Free transfer	26 December 2015	
27	FW	(England) Natasha Dowie	Unattached	Loan return	1 January 2016	

=== Contract extensions ===
No.	Position	Player	Duration	Date	Ref.
1	GK	Cassandra Dimovski	1 year	4 October 2015	
2	DF	Alex Natoli	1 year	4 October 2015	
7	DF	Enza Barilla	1 year	4 October 2015	
9	FW	Laura Spiranovic	1 year	4 October 2015	
10	MF	(United States) Christine Nairn	1 year	4 October 2015	
17	MF	(Turkey) Gülcan Koca	1 year	4 October 2015	

== Competitions ==
=== Overall record ===
Competition	First match	Last match	Starting round	Final position	Record							
Competition	First match	Last match	Starting round	Final position	Pld	W	D	L	GF	GA	GD	Win %
W-League	17 October 2015	10 January 2016	Matchday 1	9th	12	2	1	9	10	28	−18	16.67
Total					12	2	1	9	10	28	−18	16.67

Source: Competitions

=== W-League ===
==== League table ====
Pos	Team	Pld	W	D	L	GF	GA	GD	Pts	Qualification
1	Melbourne City (C)	12	12	0	0	38	4	+34	36	Qualification to Finals series
2	Canberra United	12	8	2	2	26	8	+18	26	Qualification to Finals series
3	Sydney FC	12	6	1	5	15	21	−6	19	Qualification to Finals series
4	Brisbane Roar	12	5	1	6	16	17	−1	16	Qualification to Finals series
5	Adelaide United	12	3	4	5	18	19	−1	13	
6	Newcastle Jets	12	3	4	5	9	12	−3	13	
7	Western Sydney Wanderers	12	3	3	6	15	25	−10	12	
8	Perth Glory	12	3	2	7	10	23	−13	11	
9	Melbourne Victory	12	2	1	9	10	28	−18	7	

Source: A-Leagues
Rules for classification: 1) points; 2) goal difference; 3) number of goals scored.
(C) Champions

==== Results summary ====
Overall								Home						Away					
Pld	W	D	L	GF	GA	GD	Pts	W	D	L	GF	GA	GD	W	D	L	GF	GA	GD
12	2	1	9	10	28	−18	7	0	1	5	4	15	−11	2	0	4	6	13	−7

Source: worldfootball.net

==== Results by round ====
Round	1	2	3	4	5	6	7	8	9	10	11	12	13	14
Ground	H	A	H	H	A	B	A	H	H	A	H	A	A	B
Result	L	L	L	L	L	X	W	L	D	L	L	W	L	X
Position	7	8	9	9	9	9	9	9	9	9	9	9	9	9
Points	0	0	0	0	0	0	3	3	4	4	4	7	7	7

Source: worldfootball.net
A = Away; H = Home; B = Bye; W = Win; D = Draw; L = Loss; X = Bye

==== Matches ====
Win Draw Loss

17 October 2015 1	Melbourne Victory	1–2	Perth Glory	Melbourne
15:00 AEDT	Spiranovic 8'	Report	Friend 45'; Kerr 69'	Stadium: Hume City Stadium; Referee: Katie Petterson

25 October 2015 2	Melbourne City	2–1	Melbourne Victory	Melbourne
14:00 AEDT	Tabain 49'; Luik 72' (pen.)	Report	Knight 90+2'	Stadium: AAMI Park; Attendance: 2,311; Referee: Casey Reibelt

31 October 2015 3	Melbourne Victory	0–1	Newcastle Jets	Melbourne
15:00 AEDT		Report	Logarzo 47'	Stadium: Hume City Stadium; Referee: Kate Jacewicz

8 November 2015 4	Melbourne Victory	0–4	Adelaide United	Melbourne
15:00 AEDT		Report	Sutton 14', 55', 68'; Powell 33'	Stadium: Epping Stadium; Referee: Katie Petterson

15 November 2015 5	Western Sydney Wanderers	3–1	Melbourne Victory	Sydney
15:00 AEDT	Carney 24'; Dimovski 55' (o.g.); Winters 70' (pen.)	Report	Spiranovic 75'	Stadium: Marconi Stadium; Referee: Lara Lee

28 November 2015 7	Perth Glory	1–3	Melbourne Victory	Perth
16:00 AWST	Bennett 84'	Report	Raso 9'; Nairn 52'; Dowie 90'	Stadium: Ashfield Arena; Referee: Casey Reibelt

6 December 2015 8	Melbourne Victory	0–4	Melbourne City	Melbourne
15:00 AEDT		Report	Beattie 35'; Crummer 52', 72'; Little 79'	Stadium: David Barro Stadium; Attendance: 753; Referee: Lara Lee

12 December 2015 9	Melbourne Victory	2–2	Western Sydney Wanderers	Melbourne
15:00 AEDT	Barbieri 51'; Dowie 74'	Report	O'Neill 40'; Moscato 47'	Stadium: David Barro Stadium; Referee: Kate Jacewicz

19 December 2015 10	Canberra United	3–0	Melbourne Victory	Canberra
17:00 AEDT	McCormick 47'; Sykes 56'; Heyman 81'	Report		Stadium: McKellar Park; Attendance: 667; Referee: Lara Lee

27 December 2015 11	Melbourne Victory	1–2	Sydney FC	Melbourne
14:00 AEDT	Barbieri 46'	Report	Khamis 10'; Spencer 22'	Stadium: AAMI Park; Referee: Rachael Mitchenson

3 January 2016 12	Newcastle Jets	0–1	Melbourne Victory	Newcastle
14:00 AEDT		Report	Dowie 13'	Stadium: McDonald Jones Stadium; Referee: Rebecca Durcau

10 January 2016 13	Brisbane Roar	4–0	Melbourne Victory	Gold Coast
14:30 AEST	Polkinghorne 18'; Gorry 22'; Yallop 29'; Beard 90+3'	Report		Stadium: Nikiforides Family Park; Referee: Casey Reibelt
