= 2012–13 Melbourne Victory FC (women) season =

Melbourne Victory (W-League)
2012–13 season
- Chairman: Anthony Di Pietro
- Head Coach: Darren Tan (to 14 October 2012); Mike Mulvey (from 15 October 2012 to 17 December 2012); Fabrizio Soncin (from 18 December 2012)
- W-League: 3rd
- W-League Finals: Runners-up
- Top goalscorer: League: Jessica McDonald (7); All: Jessica McDonald (7)
- Biggest win: 5–0 vs. Adelaide United (A) (1 December 2012); W-League
- Biggest defeat: 0–2 vs. Perth Glory (A) (21 October 2012); W-League; 1–3 vs. Sydney FC (H) (27 January 2013); W-League Grand Final
Home colours	Away colours

The 2012–13 season was Melbourne Victory Football Club's fifth season, in the W-League. Melbourne Victory finished 3rd in their W-League season, finishing as runners-up in the Grand Final.

== Players ==
Note: Flags indicate national team as defined under FIFA eligibility rules; some limited exceptions apply. Players may hold more than one non-FIFA nationality.

No.	Pos.	Nation	Player
1	GK	AUS	Brianna Davey
2	DF	USA	Danielle Johnson
3	DF	AUS	Maika Ruyter-Hooley
4	DF	NZL	Rebekah Stott
5	FW	AUS	Laura Spiranovic
6	MF	SWE	Petra Larsson
7	DF	AUS	Steph Catley
8	FW	AUS	Ashley Brown
9	MF	AUS	Tiffany Eliadis
10	FW	USA	Jessica McDonald
11	FW	AUS	Caitlin Friend
12	DF	AUS	Jackie Vogt

No.	Pos.	Nation	Player
13	MF	AUS	Louisa Bisby
14	MF	AUS	Enza Barilla
15	MF	AUS	Amy Jackson
17	MF	TUR	Gülcan Koca
18	MF	AUS	Cindy Lay
19	FW	AUS	Rachel Alonso
20	GK	AUS	Cassandra Dimovski
21	MF	WAL	Jess Fishlock
23	DF	AUS	Jessica Humble
30	GK	AUS	Melissa Maizels
—	MF	AUS	Georgie Koutrouvelis

== Transfers ==
=== Transfers in ===
No.	Position	Name	From	Type/fee	Date	Ref.
2	DF	Rita Mankowska	Free agent	Free transfer	19 October 2012	
9	MF	Tiffany Eliadis	Free agent	Free transfer	19 October 2012	
18	MF	Cindy Lay	Free agent	Free transfer	19 October 2012	
10	FW	(United States) Jessica McDonald	Free agent	Free transfer	25 October 2012	
6	MF	(Sweden) Petra Larsson	(Sweden) Linköping	Free transfer	8 November 2012	
22	MF	(Wales) Jess Fishlock	(England) Bristol Academy	Free transfer	8 November 2012	

=== Transfers out ===
No.	Position	Name	To	Type/fee	Date	Ref.
10	FW	(England) Jodie Taylor	(England) Birmingham City	Free transfer	27 February 2012	
4	DF	(United States) Kendall Fletcher	(Sweden) Vittsjö	Free transfer	9 March 2012	
13	MF	Katrina Gorry	Brisbane Roar	Free transfer	17 October 2012	

== Competitions ==
=== Overall record ===
Competition	First match	Last match	Starting round	Final position	Record							
Competition	First match	Last match	Starting round	Final position	Pld	W	D	L	GF	GA	GD	Win %
W-League	21 October 2012	13 January 2013	Matchday 1	3rd	12	7	2	3	26	14	+12	58.33
W-League Finals	20 January 2013	27 January 2013	Semi-finals	Runners-up	2	0	1	1	2	4	−2	0.00
Total					14	7	3	4	28	18	+10	50.00

Source: Competitions

=== W-League ===
==== League table ====
Pos	Team	Pld	W	D	L	GF	GA	GD	Pts	Qualification
1	Brisbane Roar	12	8	2	2	28	15	+13	26	Qualification to Finals series
2	Perth Glory	12	7	3	2	34	20	+14	24	Qualification to Finals series
3	Melbourne Victory	12	7	2	3	26	14	+12	23	Qualification to Finals series
4	Sydney FC (C)	12	6	2	4	30	24	+6	20	Qualification to Finals series
5	Canberra United	12	5	3	4	25	20	+5	18	
6	Western Sydney Wanderers	12	4	1	7	19	23	−4	13	
7	Newcastle Jets	12	1	3	8	15	33	−18	6	
8	Adelaide United	12	2	0	10	12	40	−28	6	

Source: au.soccerway.com
Rules for classification: 1) points; 2) goal difference; 3) number of goals scored.
(C) Champions

==== Results summary ====
Overall								Home						Away					
Pld	W	D	L	GF	GA	GD	Pts	W	D	L	GF	GA	GD	W	D	L	GF	GA	GD
12	7	2	3	26	14	+12	23	4	1	1	12	4	+8	3	1	2	14	10	+4

Source: worldfootball.net

==== Results by round ====
Round	1	2	3	4	5	6	7	8	9	10	11	12
Ground	A	H	H	A	H	A	A	H	A	H	H	A
Result	L	L	W	W	W	L	W	D	W	W	W	D
Position	8	8	7	5	2	6	4	5	3	3	2	3
Points	0	0	3	6	9	9	12	13	16	19	22	23

Source: worldfootball.net
A = Away; H = Home; W = Win; D = Draw; L = Loss

==== Matches ====
The league fixtures were announced on 18 September 2012.

Win Draw Loss

21 October 2012 1	Perth Glory	2–0	Melbourne Victory	Perth
10:30 AWST	Gill 75'; Tabain 88'	Report		Stadium: Initga Stadium; Referee: Kirralee Andruschak

27 October 2012 2	Melbourne Victory	0–1	Brisbane Roar	Melbourne
16:00 AEDT		Report	Popovic 18'	Stadium: Veneto Club; Referee: Rebecca Durcau

3 November 2012 3	Melbourne Victory	1–0	Newcastle Jets	Geelong
14:00 AEDT	Stott 45+2'	Report		Stadium: Simonds Stadium; Referee: Katie Patterson

11 November 2012 4	Sydney FC	1–2	Melbourne Victory	Sydney
16:45 AEDT	Kennedy 41'	Report	Catley 8'; Spiranovic 81'	Stadium: Leichhardt Oval; Referee: Kirralee Andruschak

17 November 2012 5	Melbourne Victory	3–0	Canberra United	Melbourne
15:00 AEDT	Fishlock 28'; McDonald 45'; Barilla 80'	Report		Stadium: Wembley Park; Attendance: 575; Referee: Casey Reibelt

24 November 2012 6	Brisbane Roar	3–2	Melbourne Victory	Brisbane
10:00 AEST	Chapman 19', 86'; Spina 90+5'	Report	Spiranovic 72'; McDonald 90+2'	Stadium: Queensland Sport and Athletics Centre; Referee: Peta McCallum

1 December 2012 7	Adelaide United	0–5	Melbourne Victory	Adelaide
14:00 ACDT		Report	Spiranovic 8'; McDonald 38', 42'; Barilla 49'; Catley 90'	Stadium: Burton Park; Referee: Kelly Jones

8 December 2012 8	Melbourne Victory	1–1	Sydney FC	Melbourne
16:00 AEDT	Ruyter-Hooley 27'	Report	Foord 4'	Stadium: Wembley Park; Referee: Peta McCallum

15 December 2012 9	Canberra United	1–2	Melbourne Victory	Canberra
14:00 AEDT	Bisset 50'	Report	Jackson 31'; Fishlock 90'	Stadium: McKellar Park; Attendance: 719; Referee: Casey Reibelt

22 December 2012 10	Melbourne Victory	3–1	Western Sydney Wanderers	Melbourne
14:00 AEDT	McDonald 5', 90'; Larsson 11'	Report	Hart 2'	Stadium: Wembley Park; Attendance: 1,257; Referee: Casey Reibelt

5 January 2013 11	Melbourne Victory	4–1	Adelaide United	Melbourne
16:00 AEDT	Johnson 2'; Larsson 6'; McDonald 14'; Spiranovic 57'	Report	McLaughlin 87'	Stadium: Wembley Park; Referee: Kirralee Andruschak

13 January 2013 12	Newcastle Jets	3–3	Melbourne Victory	Newcastle
16:00 AEDT	Courtenay 40'; van Egmond 42', 84' (pen.)	Report	Jackson 4'; Barilla 33', 62'	Stadium: Wanderers Oval; Referee: Lara Lee

==== Finals series ====
20 January 2013 Semi-finals	Perth Glory	1–1 (a.e.t.) (3–4 p)	Melbourne Victory	Perth
13:00 AWST	McCallum 56'	Report	Spiranovic 51'	Stadium: nib Stadium; Attendance: 1,589; Referee: Katie Patterson
	Penalties
	McCallum (penalty scored); Gill (penalty scored); Luik (penalty missed); R. Sutton (penalty missed); De Vanna (penalty scored)		(penalty scored) Johnson; (penalty missed) Friend; (penalty scored) P. Larsson; (penalty scored) Koca; (penalty scored) McDonald

27 January 2013 Grand Final	Melbourne Victory	1–3	Sydney FC	Melbourne
15:30 AEDT	Larsson 41'	Report	Bolger 25'; Kerr 48'; Simon 85' (pen.)	Stadium: AAMI Park; Attendance: 4,181; Referee: Kate Jacewicz

== Statistics ==
=== Appearances and goals ===
Includes all competitions. Players with no appearances not included in the list.

No.	Pos.	Nat.	Name	W-League				Total	
No.	Pos.	Nat.	Name	Regular season		Finals series		Total	
No.	Pos.	Nat.	Name	Apps	Goals	Apps	Goals	Apps	Goals
1	GK	(Australia)	Brianna Davey	10	0	2	0	12	0
2	DF	(United States)	Danielle Johnson	11	1	2	0	13	1
3	DF	(Australia)	Maika Ruyter-Hooley	12	1	2	0	14	1
4	DF	(New Zealand)	Rebekah Stott	12	1	2	0	14	1
5	FW	(Australia)	Laura Spiranovic	4+5	4	2	1	11	5
6	MF	(Sweden)	Petra Larsson	9	2	2	1	11	3
7	DF	(Australia)	Steph Catley	10	1	2	0	12	1
8	FW	(Australia)	Ashley Brown	1+1	0	0	0	2	0
9	MF	(Australia)	Tiffany Eliadis	5+2	0	0	0	7	0
10	FW	(United States)	Jessica McDonald	11	7	2	0	13	7
11	FW	(Australia)	Caitlin Friend	0+7	0	0+1	0	8	0
12	DF	(Australia)	Jackie Vogt	0+5	0	0	0	5	0
13	MF	(Australia)	Louisa Bisby	2	0	0	0	2	0
14	MF	(Australia)	Enza Barilla	12	3	2	0	14	3
15	MF	(Australia)	Amy Jackson	10+1	3	2	0	13	3
17	MF	(Turkey)	Gülcan Koca	10+1	0	2	0	13	0
18	MF	(Australia)	Cindy Lay	4+3	0	0	0	7	0
19	FW	(Australia)	Rachel Alonso	0+2	0	0	0	2	0
20	GK	(Australia)	Cassandra Dimovski	2	0	0	0	2	0
21	MF	(Wales)	Jess Fishlock	5+1	2	0	0	6	2
23	DF	(Australia)	Jessica Humble	2+3	0	0+2	0	7	0

=== Disciplinary record ===
Includes all competitions. The list is sorted by squad number when total cards are equal. Players with no cards not included in the list.

Rank	No.	Pos.	Nat.	Name	W-League						Total		
Rank	No.	Pos.	Nat.	Name	Regular season			Finals series			Total		
Rank	No.	Pos.	Nat.	Name	Booked	(yellow card) (yellow-red card)	Sent off (straight red)	Booked	(yellow card) (yellow-red card)	Sent off (straight red)	Booked	(yellow card) (yellow-red card)	Sent off (straight red)
1	3	DF	(Australia)	Maika Ruyter-Hooley	1	0	0	1	0	1	2	0	1
2	21	MF	(Wales)	Jess Fishlock	3	0	0	0	0	0	3	0	0
3	10	FW	(United States)	Jessica McDonald	1	0	0	0	0	0	1	0	0
3	14	MF	(Australia)	Enza Barilla	1	0	0	0	0	0	1	0	0
3	15	MF	(Australia)	Amy Jackson	1	0	0	0	0	0	1	0	0
3	23	DF	(Australia)	Jessica Humble	1	0	0	0	0	0	1	0	0
Total					8	0	0	1	0	1	9	0	1

=== Clean sheets ===
Includes all competitions. The list is sorted by squad number when total clean sheets are equal. Numbers in parentheses represent games where both goalkeepers participated and both kept a clean sheet; the number in parentheses is awarded to the goalkeeper who was substituted on, whilst a full clean sheet is awarded to the goalkeeper who was on the field at the start of play. Goalkeepers with no clean sheets not included in the list.

Rank	No.	Nat.	Goalkeeper	W-League		Total
Rank	No.	Nat.	Goalkeeper	Regular season	Finals series	Total
1	1	(Australia)	Brianna Davey	2	0	2
2	20	(Australia)	Cassandra Dimovski	1	0	1
Total				3	0	3
