= 2020–21 Melbourne Victory FC (women) season =

13th season in existence of Melbourne Victory (women)

Melbourne Victory (women)
2020–21 season
- Chairman: Anthony Di Pietro
- Head Coach: Jeff Hopkins
- W-League: 3rd
- W-League Finals: Winners
- Top goalscorer: League: Melina Ayres; Kyra Cooney-Cross; Catherine Zimmerman (5 each); All: Melina Ayres (8)
- Highest home attendance: 1,034 vs. Melbourne City (17 January 2021); W-League
- Lowest home attendance: 413 vs. Newcastle Jets (7 February 2021); W-League
- Average home league attendance: 589
- Biggest win: 6–0 vs. Melbourne City (A) (10 January 2021); W-League
- Biggest defeat: 0–6 vs. Brisbane Roar (A) (22 January 2021); W-League
Home colours	Away colours

The 2020–21 season was Melbourne Victory Football Club (women)'s 13th season in the W-League. Melbourne Victory finished 3rd in their W-League season, and won the Grand Final.

== Players ==
Note: Flags indicate national team as defined under FIFA eligibility rules; some limited exceptions apply. Players may hold more than one non-FIFA nationality.

No.	Pos.	Nation	Player
1	GK	ARG	Gaby Garton
2	MF	AUS	Tiffany Eliadis
3	DF	NZL	Claudia Bunge
4	MF	CAN	Natalie Martineau
5	FW	AUS	Gabe Marzano
6	DF	AUS	Natalie Tathem
7	MF	AUS	Kyra Cooney-Cross
8	DF	AUS	Angela Beard
9	FW	USA	Catherine Zimmerman
10	MF	NZL	Annalie Longo

No.	Pos.	Nation	Player
11	FW	AUS	Lisa De Vanna
13	DF	AUS	Polly Doran
14	FW	AUS	Melina Ayres
15	MF	AUS	Amy Jackson
17	FW	AUS	Maja Markovski
18	DF	USA	Kayla Morrison
19	FW	AUS	Lia Privitelli
20	GK	AUS	Melissa Maizels
23	MF	AUS	Paige Zois
30	MF	AUS	MelindaJ Barbieri

== Transfers and contracts ==
=== Transfers in ===
No.	Position	Player	Transferred from	Type/fee	Date	Ref.
9	FW	(United States) Catherine Zimmerman	(Australia) Calder United	Free transfer	15 October 2020	
18	DF	(United States) Kayla Morrison	(Sweden) Morön	Free transfer	4 November 2020	
30	MF	MelindaJ Barbieri	Unattached	Free transfer	6 November 2020	
3	DF	(New Zealand) Claudia Bunge	(New Zealand) Northern Lights	Free transfer	10 November 2020	
7	MF	Kyra Cooney-Cross	Western Sydney Wanderers	Free transfer	2 December 2020	
11	FW	Lisa De Vanna	Unattached	Free transfer	2 December 2020	
17	FW	Maja Markovski	Melbourne City	Free transfer	4 December 2020	
4	MF	(Canada) Natalie Martineau	(Australia) South Melbourne	Free transfer	8 December 2020	
1	GK	(Argentina) Gaby Garton	(Australia) Essendon Royals	Free transfer	9 December 2020	
6	DF	Natalie Tathem	Brisbane Roar	Free transfer	10 December 2020	
2	MF	Tiffany Eliadis	(Australia) South Melbourne	Free transfer	23 December 2020	
23	MF	Paige Zois	Unattached	Free transfer	21 January 2021	
5	FW	Gabe Marzano	Unattached	Free transfer	15 March 2021	

=== Transfers out ===
No.	Position	Player	Transferred to	Type/fee	Date	Ref.
4	DF	(United States) Emily Menges	(United States) Portland Thorns	Loan return	8 April 2020	
6	DF	(United States) Haley Hanson	(United States) Houston Dash	Loan return	15 April 2020	
30	GK	Teagan Micah	(Norway) Arna-Bjørnar	Free transfer	31 May 2020	
11	FW	(United States) Darian Jenkins	(United States) OL Reign	Loan return	19 June 2020	
9	FW	(England) Natasha Dowie	(Italy) Milan	Free transfer	17 July 2020	
5	DF	Laura Brock	(France) Guingamp	Free transfer	20 July 2020	
10	DF	Jenna McCormick	(Spain) Real Betis	Free transfer	22 July 2020	
7	MF	Emma Robers	Unattached	Free transfer	8 August 2020	
18	DF	Grace Maher	Canberra United	Free transfer	10 September 2020	
2	MF	Rosie Sutton	Brisbane Roar	Free transfer	13 November 2020	
3	DF	Teigen Allen	Melbourne City	Free transfer	29 November 2020	
1	GK	Casey Dumont	Unattached	Free transfer	9 December 2020	

=== Contract extensions ===
No.	Position	Player	Duration	Date	Ref.
19	FW	Lia Privitelli	1 year	14 October 2020	
8	DF	Angela Beard	1 year	16 October 2020	
14	FW	Melina Ayres	3 years	27 October 2020	
15	MF	Amy Jackson	1 year	28 October 2020	
10	MF	Annalie Longo	1 year	20 November 2020	
13	DF	Polly Doran	1 year	7 December 2020	
20	GK	Melissa Maizels	1 year	9 December 2020	

== Pre-season and friendlies ==
Win Draw Loss

19 December 2020	Melbourne City (Australia)	3–3	(Australia) Melbourne Victory	Melbourne
	Iermano 28'; Tumeth 72'; Dobson (?)	Report	(unknown) 2', 27' (?)	Stadium: City Football Academy

== Competitions ==
=== Overall record ===
Competition	First match	Last match	Starting round	Final position	Record							
Competition	First match	Last match	Starting round	Final position	Pld	W	D	L	GF	GA	GD	Win %
W-League	3 January 2021	31 March 2021	Matchday 1	3rd	12	7	2	3	25	14	+11	58.33
W-League Finals	4 April 2021	11 April 2021	Semi-finals	Winners	2	2	0	0	7	2	+5	100.00
Total					14	9	2	3	32	16	+16	64.29

Source: Competitions

=== W-League ===
==== League table ====
Pos	Team	Pld	W	D	L	GF	GA	GD	Pts	Qualification
1	Sydney FC	12	9	1	2	26	11	+15	28	Qualification to Finals series
2	Brisbane Roar	12	7	4	1	29	12	+17	25	Qualification to Finals series
3	Melbourne Victory (C)	12	7	2	3	25	14	+11	23	Qualification to Finals series
4	Canberra United	12	6	4	2	21	16	+5	22	Qualification to Finals series
5	Adelaide United	12	7	1	4	22	18	+4	22	
6	Western Sydney Wanderers	12	4	1	7	13	21	−8	13	
7	Melbourne City	12	4	1	7	11	23	−12	13	
8	Newcastle Jets	12	2	1	9	14	21	−7	7	
9	Perth Glory	12	0	1	11	7	32	−25	1	

Source: A-Leagues
Rules for classification: 1) points; 2) goal difference; 3) number of goals scored.
(C) Champions

==== Results summary ====
Overall								Home						Away					
Pld	W	D	L	GF	GA	GD	Pts	W	D	L	GF	GA	GD	W	D	L	GF	GA	GD
12	7	2	3	25	14	+11	23	3	2	1	14	6	+8	4	0	2	11	8	+3

Source: worldfootball.net

==== Results by round ====
Round	5	6	10	5	3	14	9	12	11	9	4	13
Ground	H	A	H	A	A	H	A	H	H	A	H	A
Result	D	W	L	L	W	W	W	D	W	W	W	L
Position	5	3	4	5	5	4	3	4	3	3	2	3
Points	1	4	4	4	7	10	13	14	17	20	23	23

Source: A-Leagues
A = Away; H = Home; W = Win; D = Draw; L = Loss

==== Matches ====
The league fixtures were announced on 30 November 2020.

3 January 2021 5	Melbourne Victory	0–0	Brisbane Roar	Melbourne
18:05 AEDT		Report		Stadium: CB Smith Reserve; Attendance: 426; Referee: Lara Lee
Note: Match originally scheduled for 23 January at 17:00 AEDT at Epping Stadium, but rescheduled due to other fixture arrangements. It was rescheduled for 3 January at 18:05 AEDT at CB Smith Reserve.

10 January 2021 6	Melbourne City	0–6	Melbourne Victory	Melbourne
16:05 AEDT		Report	Longo 15'; Ayres 29'; De Vanna 72'; Jackson 80'; Zimmerman 90'; Cooney-Cross 90+2'	Stadium: CB Smith Reserve; Attendance: 729; Referee: Lachlan Keevers
Note: Match originally scheduled for 28 January at 19:00 AEDT, but rescheduled due to other fixture arrangements. It was rescheduled for 10 January at 16:05 AEDT. Match then changed to take place from Frank Holohan Soccer Complex to CB Smith Reserve, due to considerable damages of the Frank Holohan Soccer Complex pitch.

17 January 2021 10	Melbourne Victory	2–3	Melbourne City	Melbourne
16:05 AEDT	MelindaJ Barbieri 47'; Zimmerman 51'	Report	Chidiac 22'; Bunge 25' (o.g.); Withers 86'	Stadium: Epping Stadium; Attendance: 1,034; Referee: Danielle Anderson
Note: Match originally scheduled for 27 February at 16:30 AEDT at Marvel Stadium, but rescheduled due to other fixture arrangements. It was rescheduled for 17 January at 16:05 AEDT at Epping Stadium.

22 January 2021 5	Brisbane Roar	6–0	Melbourne Victory	Gold Coast
20:05 AEST	Hecher 26'; Yallop 39'; Freier 64'; Gielnik 76', 90+1'; Heatley 90+5'	Report		Stadium: Gold Coast Sports Centre; Attendance: 1,455; Referee: Lara Lee
Note: Match not originally set in fixture draw, but added due to other fixture arrangements.

29 January 2021 3	Adelaide United	0–1	Melbourne Victory	Adelaide
18:35 ACDT		Report	Zimmerman 78'	Stadium: Marden Sports Complex; Attendance: 1,105; Referee: Rebecca Durcau
Note: Match originally scheduled for 9 January at 16:30 ACDT, but postponed due to other fixture arrangements. It was rescheduled for 29 January at 18:35 ACDT.

7 February 2021 14	Melbourne Victory	4–2	Newcastle Jets	Melbourne
18:05 AEDT	Ayres 13', 81'; Bunge 41'; Cooney-Cross 42'	Report	Andrews 48'; Pollicina 76'	Stadium: Latrobe City Stadium; Attendance: 413; Referee: Isabella Libri
Note: Match originally scheduled for 28 March at Epping Stadium, but rescheduled due to other fixture arrangements. It was rescheduled for 7 February at Latrobe City Stadium.

20 February 2021 9	Newcastle Jets	0–2	Melbourne Victory	Newcastle
16:05 AEDT		Report	Morrison 8'; Zimmerman 30'	Stadium: Newcastle No.2 Sportsground; Attendance: 652; Referee: Casey Reibelt
Note: Match not originally set in fixture draw, but added due to other fixture arrangements.

28 February 2021 12	Melbourne Victory	1–1	Canberra United	Melbourne
16:05 AEDT	Beard 9'	Report	Flannery 47'	Stadium: Epping Stadium; Attendance: 562; Referee: Kelly Jones
Note: Match originally scheduled for 14 March at 18:00 AEDT, but rescheduled for 28 February at 16:05 AEDT.

4 March 2021 11	Melbourne Victory	1–0	Western Sydney Wanderers	Melbourne
19:05 AEDT	Longo 43'	Report		Stadium: AAMI Park; Attendance: 0 (behind closed doors); Referee: Georgia Ghirardello
Note: Match not originally set in fixture draw, but added due to other fixture arrangements. Match then changed to take place behind closed doors at AAMI Park.

16 March 2021 9	Perth Glory	0–1	Melbourne Victory	Perth
18:35 AWST		Report	Longo 62'	Stadium: Dorrien Gardens; Attendance: 250; Referee: Rebecca Durcau
Note: Match originally scheduled for 20 February at 18:00 AWST, but rescheduled due to other fixture arrangements. It was rescheduled for 30 December at 17:05 AWST. Match then postponed again due to other fixture arrangements. It was then rescheduled for 14 February at 18:05 AWST, then rescheduled again for 16 March at 18:35 AWST.

28 March 2021 4	Melbourne Victory	6–0	Perth Glory	Melbourne
16:05 AEDT	Ayres 21', 35'; Bunge 48'; Zimmerman 53'; Cooney-Cross 60', 76'	Report		Stadium: Epping Stadium; Attendance: 508; Referee: Rebecca Mackie
Note: Match originally scheduled for 14 January at 19:00 AEDT at Lakeside Stadium, but rescheduled due to other fixture arrangements. It was rescheduled for 17 January at 16:05 AEDT. Match then postponed due to other fixture arrangements. It was then rescheduled for 7 February at Epping Stadium. Match then changed to take place at Latrobe City Stadium at 18:05 AEDT, then postponed again due to Perth's five-day COVID-19 lockdown. It was then rescheduled for 28 March at 16:05 AEDT back at Epping Stadium.

31 March 2021 13	Sydney FC	2–1	Melbourne Victory	Sydney
19:35 AEDT	Polias 29'; Ibini-Isei 73' (pen.)	Report	Cooney-Cross 90+5'	Stadium: Cromer Park; Attendance: 1,111; Referee: Casey Reibelt
Note: Match originally scheduled for 20 March at 16:30 AEDT at Netstrata Jubilee Stadium, but postponed due to waterlogged pitch surface. It was rescheduled for 31 March at 19:35 AEDT at Cromer Park.

==== Finals series ====
4 April 2021 Semi-finals	Brisbane Roar	2–6	Melbourne Victory	Brisbane
16:00 AEDT	Chance 43'; Yallop 74'	Report	De Vanna 23', 61'; Zimmerman 45'; Ayres 47', 87', 90+6'	Stadium: Lions Stadium; Attendance: 1,985; Referee: Lara Lee

11 April 2021 Grand final	Sydney FC	0–1 (a.e.t.)	Melbourne Victory	Sydney
16:05 AEDT		Report	Cooney-Cross 120'	Stadium: Netstrata Jubilee Stadium; Attendance: 4,619; Referee: Rebecca Durcau
