= Špiranović =

Špiranović [ʃpiranɔʋitɕ] is a Croatian family name. Approximately 70 people with this name live in Croatia, of which 25 live in Slavonski Brod.

Among the most notable people with the surname are Australian sportspersons:

- Matthew Spiranovic (born 1988), Australian Association football player
- Laura Spiranovic (born 1991), Australian soccer player
