= Jamie Pollock (soccer, born 1989) =

American soccer player

Personal information
- Full name: Jamie Pollock
- Date of birth: October 18, 1989 (age 37)
- Place of birth: Florida, United States
- Height: 5 ft 6 in (1.68 m)
- Position: Midfielder

Youth career
- Harrison Hoyas

College career
Years	Team	Apps	(Gls)
2008–2011	Georgia Bulldogs		

Senior career*
Years	Team	Apps	(Gls)
2011	Atlanta Silverbacks		
2014	Boston Breakers		
2015–2016	Melbourne Victory	10	(0)
2015–2020	South Melbourne FC		
- * Club domestic league appearances and goals as of 28 April 2021

Jamie Pollock (born October 18, 1989) is an American soccer midfielder. She last played for semi-professional Australian club South Melbourne FC.

== Early life ==
Raised in Powder Springs, Georgia, Pollock attended Harrison High School where she was named MVP, captain of the soccer team, and most athletic female during her senior year in 2008. She was named the school's most valuable offensive player for four consecutive years in 2005–2008 as she led Harrison as the team's highest scorer. In 2007, she was named NSCAA Youth All-American.

Pollock played club soccer for Tophat 08 Gold from 2005 to 2007. In 2007, she captained the team to the Georgia state championship. She also played for the regional and state Olympic Development Program (ODP) teams helping win the State ODP National Championship in 2005 and the Georgia state championship in 2003, 2004, and 2007.

In October 2015, Pollock was inducted into Harrison's Hall of Fame.

=== University of Georgia Bulldogs, 2009–2012 ===
Pollock attended the University of Georgia from 2009 to 2012 where she started in every game she played for the Georgia Bulldogs. As a sophomore, Pollock was named to Soccer America National Team of the Week after scoring two goals against Florida Atlantic University. She was also and MVP of the Georgia Nike Invitational. Her six goals and one assist (13 points) on the season ranked third for the team. Following her junior season when she scored two goals and two assists, Pollock was named to the TopDrawerSoccer Watch List. As a senior in 2011, Pollock was named to the All-SEC first team. She finished her collegiate career with 12 goals and 8 assists.

== Playing career ==
=== Atlanta and Boston, 2011–2014 ===
In 2012, Pollock was offered a spot on the Atlanta Beat by head coach James Galanis; however, the WPS folded before the 2012 season began. She joined the Atlanta Silverbacks in the USL W-League where she helped the team win the national championship in 2011 and later played for the reserve team for the Boston Breakers.

=== Melbourne Victory, 2015–present ===
In 2015, Pollock signed with the Melbourne Victory for the 2015–16 W-League season.

In 2020, after a decorated career with South Melbourne FC, Pollock returned to the United States.
