= Meghan Archer =

Australian soccer player

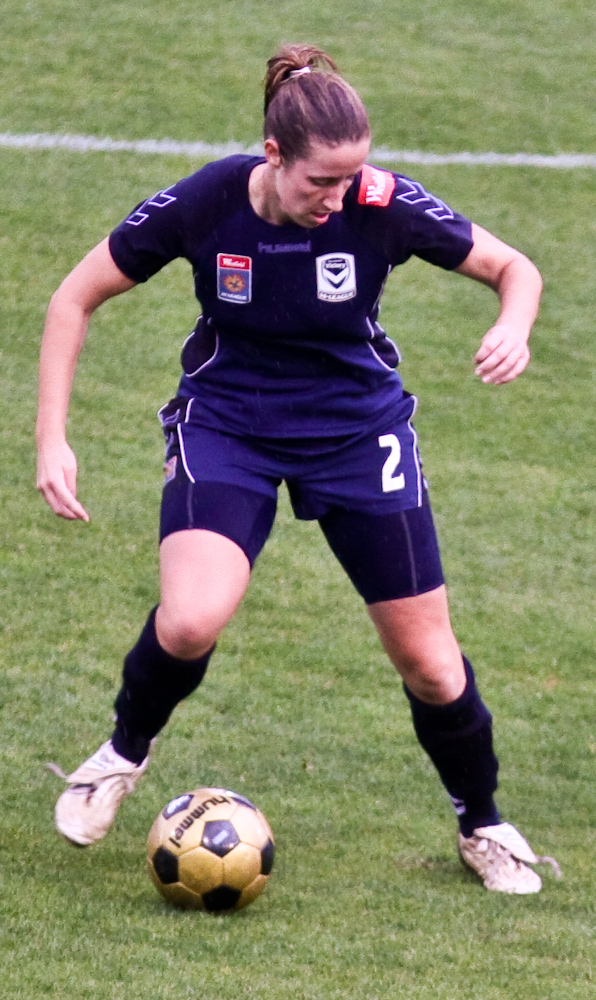

Personal information
- Date of birth: 9 October 1987 (age 39)
- Place of birth: Devonport, Tasmania, Australia
- Height: 1.82 m (6 ft 0 in)
- Position: Midfielder

Team information
- Current team: Melbourne Victory
- Number: 2

Youth career
- Devonport City

Senior career*
| Years | Team | Apps | (Gls) |
| 2004 | Devonport City | | |
| 2005–2007 | Heidelberg United | 65 | (19) |
| 2005 | Victoria Vision | 5 | (3) |
| 2008 | Ashburton | 7 | (4) |
| 2008 | Heidelberg United | 15 | (1) |
| 2008–2009 | Melbourne Victory | 6 | (0) |
- * Club domestic league appearances and goals ‡ National team caps and goals as of 3 December 2008

Meghan Archer (born 9 October 1987) is an Australian soccer player who formerly played for Melbourne Victory in the W-League.

Archer was born and raised in Devonport, Tasmania, where she began playing soccer at a young age, notably scoring 25 goals for Devonport City as a 16-year-old in the 2004 Northern Premier League. In the same year, Meghan competed for Tasmania in the Under-17 National Championships, where she was identified as one of the players of the tournament, and invited by then NTC coach Harry Chalkitis to train with his squad in Melbourne.

After securing an NTC squad position, Archer relocated to Melbourne in 2005, where she played for Heidelberg United in the Victorian Premier League, making a total of 65 appearances and scoring 19 goals in her first three seasons at the club. In 2005, she appeared for Victoria Vision in what was the final season of the WNSL, scoring 3 goals in 5 games. In 2006, she won the Jane Oakleigh Award for Outstanding Achievement with the NTC, and was called up for training camps with the Young Matildas in 2005 and 2006 respectively.

Archer scored the second goal in Heidelberg United's 3–2 victory over Box Hill Inter in the Grand Final of the 2007 Victorian Premier League. She transferred to Ashburton in 2008, but after 4 goals in 7 appearances, returned to Heidelberg United, helping the club to its third successive grand final appearance.

In 2008, Archer was selected by the Melbourne Victory for the inaugural season of the W-League.
