= Christine Nairn =

American soccer player (born 1990)

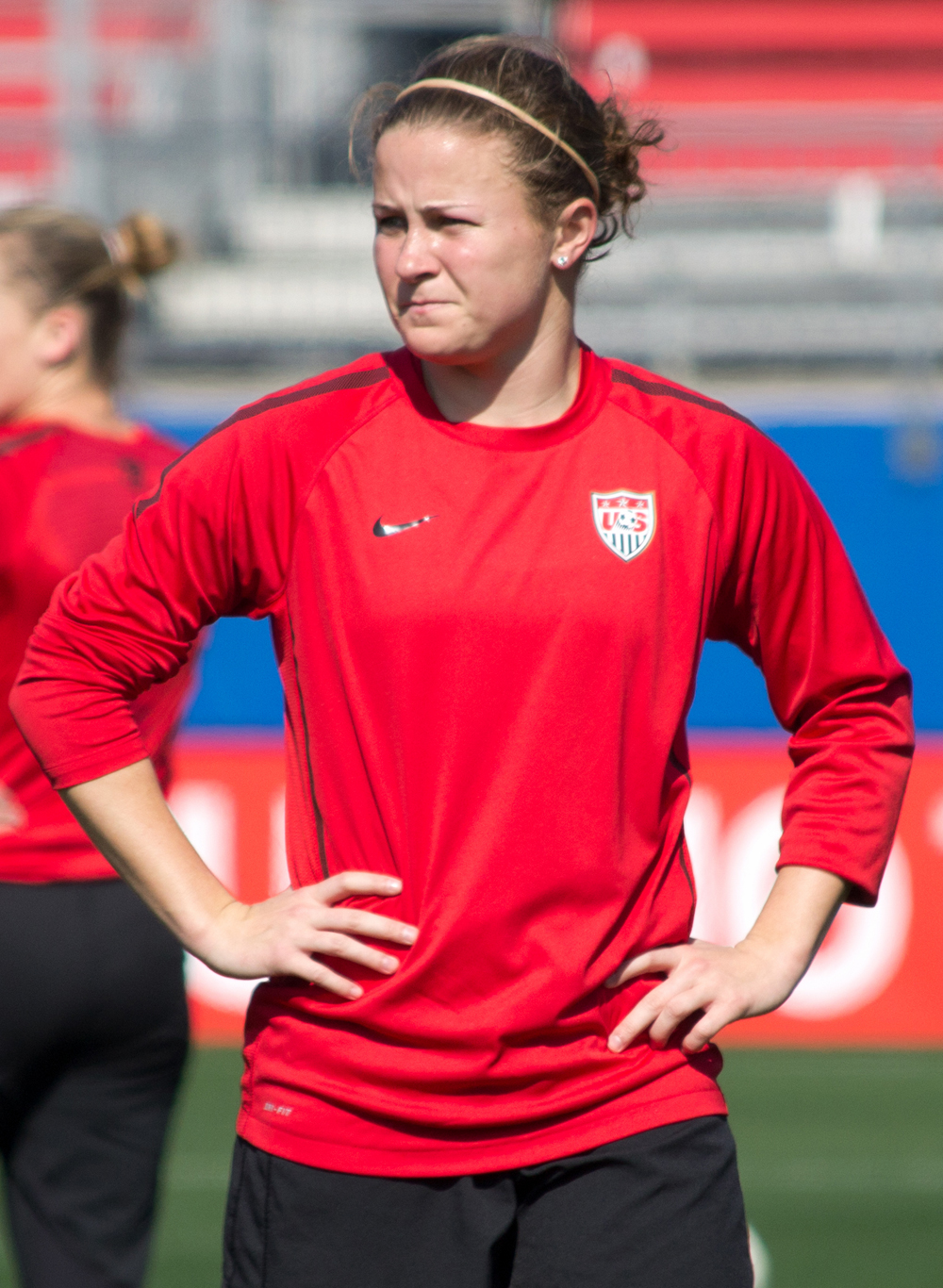
- Nairn playing for the United States in 2012

Personal information
- Full name: Christine Marie Nairn
- Date of birth: September 25, 1990 (age 36)
- Place of birth: Annapolis, Maryland, United States
- Height: 5 ft 5 in (1.65 m)
- Position: Midfielder

Youth career
- Team Freestate Soccer Alliance

College career
Years	Team	Apps	(Gls)
2009–2012	Penn State Nittany Lions	94	(34)

Senior career*
Years	Team	Apps	(Gls)
2009	Washington Freedom Reserves		
2011	D.C. United Women	4	(3)
2012	ASA Chesapeake Charge	3	(1)
2013	Seattle Reign FC	22	(3)
2014–2016	Washington Spirit	63	(14)
2014–2019	→ Melbourne Victory (loan)	49	(10)
2017	Seattle Reign FC	23	(1)
2018	Orlando Pride	20	(1)
2019–2021	Houston Dash	27	(1)

International career^{‡}
2004–2006	United States U-16		
2005–2006	United States U-17		
2006–2007	United States U-18		
2008–2010	United States U-20	28	(3)
2010–2013	United States U-23		
2009	United States	2	(1)
- * Club domestic league appearances and goals as of September 18, 2021 ‡ National team caps and goals as of July 20, 2010

Christine Marie Nairn (born September 25, 1990) is an American retired soccer player. She played for the Houston Dash, Orlando Pride, Washington Spirit, and Seattle Reign FC in the United States National Women's Soccer League (NWSL) and had regular loan spells with Melbourne Victory in the Australian W-League. She represented the United States at senior level and numerous youth levels. In 2008, she helped the under-20 national team win gold at the 2008 FIFA U-20 Women's World Cup in Chile. Nairn retired from professional soccer on September 18, 2021, to pursue a career as a professional firefighter with the Houston Fire Department.

== Early life ==
Born in Annapolis, Maryland to parents Tommy and Danamarie Nairn, Christine attended Archbishop Spalding High School in Severn, Maryland where she was all-time leader in assists, goals and points from 2004 to 2007 and was a four-time Parade All-American. Besides excelling in soccer, she played four years of varsity basketball in high school. She was a National Honor Society member and graduated with Dean's List honors.

Nairn was a three-time All-State selection, an NSCAA/adidas All-American from 2005 to 2008, and the Gatorade Maryland State Player of the Year from 2005 to 2007. She was named Player of the Year by The Washington Post and was an NSCAA/adidas All-South Region selection from 2005 to 2007.

Nairn started playing soccer when she was just four years old competing against her older brothers, Kevin and TJ, in her back yard. After her club coach, Pat Noel, encouraged her to go to an Olympic Development Program (ODP) tryout at age nine, she was accepted in the program. Nairn credits the Maryland ODP program as a very important contributor for her national recognition achievements.

Nairn played club soccer with the Freestate Shooters U-18 team, which won the WAGS Championship and Maryland State Cup in 2004 and the U.S. Club Soccer Championship in 2007. She was also a four-year captain for the Region I Olympic Development Program (ODP) team and won the 2006 Regional ODP National Championship.

In January 2008, during her senior year in high school, Nairn was called up to the United States women's national soccer team and was the youngest member to attend training camp. The same year, Soccer Buzz named her the number three recruit in the country.

=== Penn State, 2009–2012 ===
Nairn attended Pennsylvania State University from 2009 to 2012 and majored in Communications. During her freshman year, she started in all but two games as the team's central midfielder. She scored seven goals and led the team in assists at ten. Nairn recorded three assists in a 4–0 win over then-number 22 Purdue University on November 1 setting a new freshman record and second most in a game. She tallied a point in 10 of 12 games from September 13 to November 1. Nairn earned unanimous All-Big Ten Conference First Team, Big Ten Freshman of the Year and All-Freshman Team honors and was named TopDrawerSoccer.com Rookie of the Year. She was twice named Big Ten Freshman of the Week on October 5 and November 2 and was named to the Hermann Trophy Watch List.

As a sophomore, Nairn scored 7 goals and provided 6 assists for 20 points. She was named to the All-Big Ten First Team and NSCAA All-Great Lakes First Team. She started in all 21 games in central midfield leading the team in shots at 73. She scored the second-fastest goal in Penn State history, a strike 63 seconds into the match at the University of Connecticut on September 5. Nairn notched penalty-kick goals in games against the University of Portland, Michigan State University, and Northwestern University. She was named team MVP and to the Eastern College Athletic Conference (ECAC) First-Team All-Star squad.

During her junior year with the Nittany Lions, Nairn started in 24 of 25 matches in attacking midfield. She tallied three goals and 13 assists for 19 points, earning NSCAA All-American Second Team honors for a second straight year. She garnered All-Big Ten and NSCAA All-Great Lake First Team honors for a third straight year. She tallied assists at Pittsburgh, UCF, and Virginia, capping a four-game point streak and assisted game-winners vs. Ohio State and Michigan State. Nairn provided the assist on Penn State's lone goal in the Big Ten Final against Illinois and scored a dramatic 85th-minute game-winner against Army in the NCAA First Round. Nairn also tallied two assists in a 4–1 victory over number 12 Marquette in the NCAA Second Round.

As a senior in 2012, Nairn earned her first ever Big Ten Midfielder of the Year and first team NSCAA All-American honor. She finished her career with the second highest number of all-time assists in program history and doubled her career goal total (second highest in the conference) with 17 goals. She was one of two players in the 2012 College Cup with double-digit goals and assists. Nairn scored an exciting golden goal against Florida State in the national semifinals.

In 2013, Nairn was one of three finalists for the Hermann Trophy coming in second to University of North Carolina midfielder and future Washington Spirit teammate, Crystal Dunn.

== Club career ==
=== W-League: Washington Freedom Futures and DC United Women, 2010–11 ===
In 2010, Nairn played for the Washington Freedom Futures in the W-League. In 2011, Nairn signed with D.C. United Women in the W-League. She made four appearances, scoring three goals and providing one assist notching seven points for the season. She scored twice in a game against the New York Magic leading the team to its first win in franchise history.

=== ASA Chesapeake Charge, 2012 ===
In 2012, she played for the NCAA-compliant semi-professional club, ASA Chesapeake Charge, in WPSL Elite. She played in three games and scored one goal.

=== Seattle Reign FC, 2013, 2017 ===
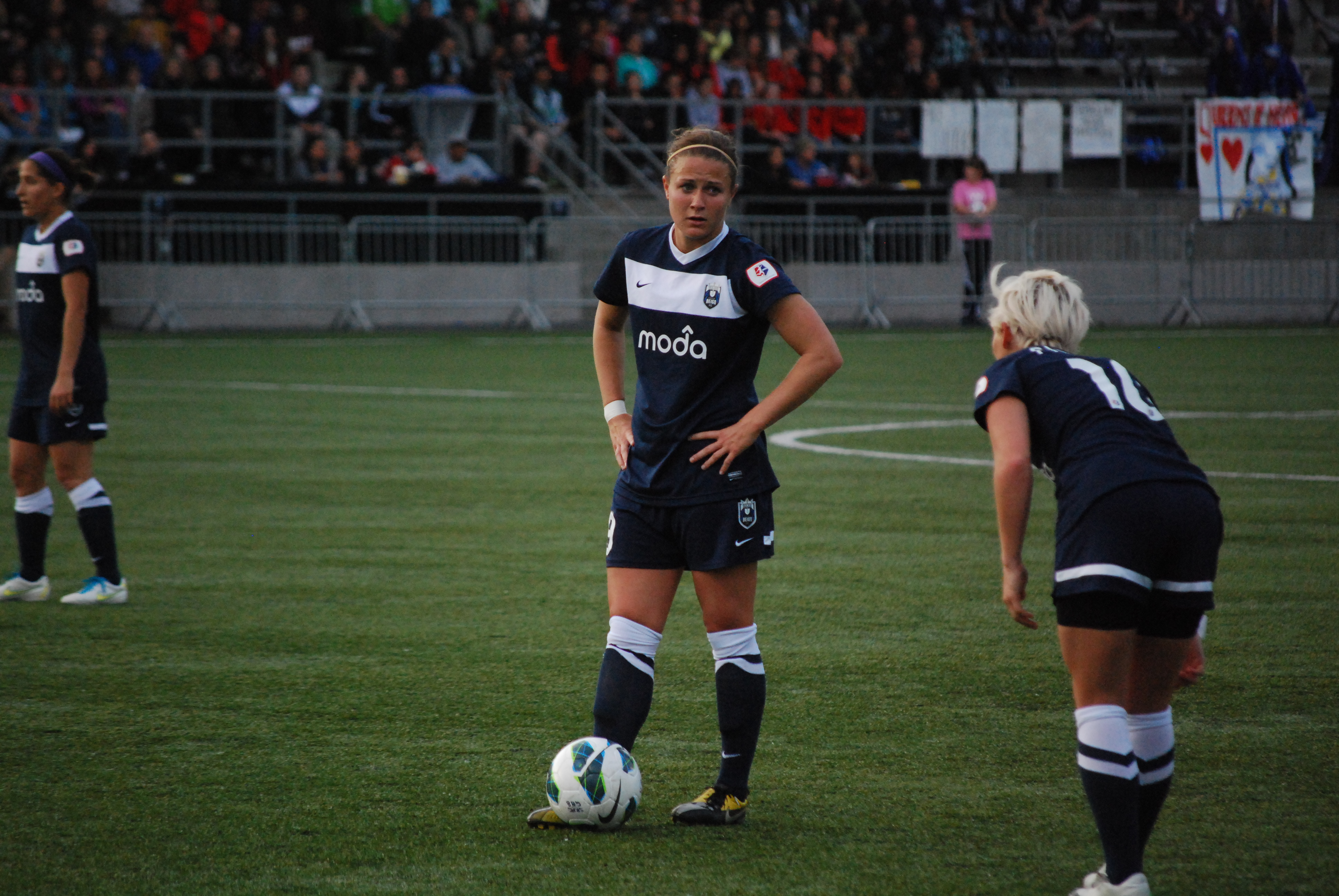
Nairn (left) and Jess Fishlock prepare for a free kick during a match against the Portland Thorns FC on May 25, 2013

On January 18, 2013, Nairn was drafted to the Seattle Reign FC as the seventh pick (first round) of the 2013 NWSL Draft. On her signing, Nairn said, "It's a great opportunity, like I said before, to represent Seattle and where I've come from – Penn State, and all the teams I played for before. To represent them on a professional stage is a dream come true. I'm excited to get to work." Nairn scored the first regular season goal for the Reign during the team's first league match against Chicago Red Stars on April 14, 2013, with a diving header on a cross from forward, Liz Bogus. Nairn led the team in assists and was a leading-scorer. She finished the regular season with five assists and three goals. Nairn returned to the Reign for the 2017 NWSL season. She appeared in all 23 matches, having 21 stars.

=== Washington Spirit, 2014–2016 ===
On November 20, 2013, the Seattle Reign traded Nairn to the Washington Spirit for the discovery rights to Scottish international Kim Little. In 2014, she scored six goals and took 52 out of 76 corner kicks for the Spirit. In 2015, Nairn scored five goals and recorded two assists. In her third year with the team, the midfielder was voted Spirit MVP for her contributions to the first ever NWSL Championship appearance for the Spirit. She played every match for the Spirit in 2016, starting 18 in the regular season and both post season matches, and scored three goals. Her goal against the Houston Dash on August 18 earned her the NWSL Goal of the Week honors in Week 16. Nairn's most memorable assist of the season came in the semifinal on Francisca Ordega's game-winning goal to send the Spirit to the NWSL Championship.

=== Melbourne Victory, 2014–2019 ===
In September 2014, Nairn went on loan to the Melbourne Victory for the 2014 W-League season. She returned for the 2015-16 season and 2016-17 season. After taking a season off she returned to the Victory for her fourth loan spell with the club in the 2018-19 W-League season. She won the W-League Premiership in 2018–19. She subsequently received the Julie Dolan Medal, becoming the first international player to receive Australia's W-League player of the year award.

=== Orlando Pride, 2018–2019 ===
Nairn joined the Orlando Pride alongside Carson Pickett, in a deal that sent Steph Catley to Seattle. During her first season with the Pride she made 20 appearances, of which 13 were starts. She finished the season tied second in assists alongside Marta. She also won the NWSL goal of the week in Week 7 of the season. Her contract option for the 2019 season was exercised.

=== Houston Dash, 2019–2021 ===
On February 26, 2019, Orlando Pride traded Nairn to the Houston Dash for exchange for an international slot and draft picks. On October 12, 2019, she became the first NWSL player to make 150 league appearances. She retired from professional soccer on September 18, 2021, after a friendly match against Tigres UANL to become a firefighter with the Houston Fire Department.

== International career ==
Nairn played for the United States U-16, U-17, U-18 and U-20 teams from 2004 to 2010. She played in all six games for the team that won the 2008 FIFA U-20 Women's World Cup in Chile.

She has played twice for the United States women's national soccer team, both against Canada during summer of 2009, debuting on 25 May in Toronto in a 4–0 win, then scoring the winning goal in a 1–0 victory on July 22 in Charleston, South Carolina.

=== International goals ===
Key (expand for notes on "international goals" and sorting)
Location	Geographic location of the venue where the competition occurred Sorted by country name first, then by city name
Lineup	Start – played entire match on minute (off player) – substituted on at the minute indicated, and player was substituted off at the same time off minute (on player) – substituted off at the minute indicated, and player was substituted on at the same time (c) – captain Sorted by minutes played
Min	The minute in the match the goal was scored. For list that include caps, blank indicates played in the match but did not score a goal.
Assist/pass	The ball was passed by the player, which assisted in scoring the goal. This column depends on the availability and source of this information.
penalty or pk	Goal scored on penalty-kick which was awarded due to foul by opponent. (Goals scored in penalty-shoot-out, at the end of a tied match after extra-time, are not included.)
Score	The match score after the goal was scored. Sorted by goal difference, then by goal scored by the player's team
Result	The final score. Sorted by goal difference in the match, then by goal difference in penalty-shoot-out if it is taken, followed by goal scored by the player's team in the match, then by goal scored in the penalty-shoot-out. For matches with identical final scores, match ending in extra-time without penalty-shoot-out is a tougher match, therefore precede matches that ended in regulation
aet	The score at the end of extra-time; the match was tied at the end of 90' regulation
pso	Penalty-shoot-out score shown in parentheses; the match was tied at the end of extra-time
	Green background color – exhibition or closed door international friendly match
NOTE: some keys may not apply for a particular football player

Goal	Date	Location	Opponent	Lineup	Min	Assist/pass	Score	Result	Competition
1	2009-07-22	(United States) Charleston, South Carolina	Canada	(substituted on) 81' ( (substituted off) Lloyd)	89	Lauren Cheney	1–0	1–0	Friendly

== Personal life ==
In 2017, Nairn came out as gay on her personal blog, "Finding my Euphoria". In her post "What Even is Normal" she stated:

"I am done with living a life that is acceptable to someone else's standards of "normal". As a female, it is not "normal" to prioritize your life around a sport. I do. It is not "normal" to only live in an area for 6 months because you have to go to your next season. I do. It is not "normal" to miss holidays with the family because you are playing soccer. I do. It is not "normal" to be gay. I am. It's not "normal" to not know what you want to do with your life. I don't. The list goes on and on, but it shouldn't matter because what even is normal?"

Nairn married United States women's national soccer team and Houston Dash goalkeeper Jane Campbell in December 2023.

== Honors ==
Melbourne Victory

- W-League Premiership: 2018–19

Houston Dash

- NWSL Challenge Cup: 2020

United States U20

- FIFA U-20 Women's World Cup: 2008
- CONCACAF Women's U-20 Championship: 2010

Individual

- Julie Dolan Medal: 2018–19

== See also ==
- List of Melbourne Victory Women players
- List of foreign players in the W-League (Australia)
