= Enza Barilla =

Australian football player

Personal information
- Full name: Enza Barilla
- Date of birth: 10 April 1991 (age 35)
- Place of birth: Melbourne, Australia
- Height: 1.53 m (5 ft 0 in)
- Position: Midfielder

Team information
- Current team: Calder United SC
- Number: 6

Senior career*
Years	Team	Apps	(Gls)
2008–2014	Melbourne Victory	55	(7)
2015–2016	Melbourne Victory	10	(0)
- * Club domestic league appearances and goals as of 16 October 2016

Enza Barilla (born 10 April 1991) is an Australian football (soccer) player, who last played for Melbourne Victory in the Australian W-League. Barilla also plays for Bundoora United FC, along with fellow Victory players Gülcan Koca and Rachel Alonso.
