= Tal Karp =

Australian association footballer

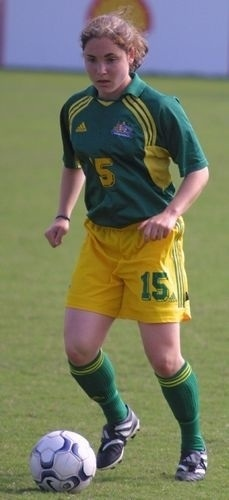

Personal information
- Date of birth: 30 December 1981 (age 44)
- Place of birth: Perth, Western Australia, Australia
- Position: Midfielder

Senior career*
Years	Team	Apps	(Gls)
1996–1997	Canberra Eclipse		
1997–1998	Adelaide Sensation		
1998–2004	Canberra Eclipse		
2004–2005	Western Waves		
2008–2009	Melbourne Victory	20	(1)

International career^{‡}
2002–2004	Australia	27	(2)
- * Club domestic league appearances and goals as of 9 December 2008 ‡ National team caps and goals as of 3 July 2011

Tal Karp (born 30 December 1981) is an Australian women's former Olympic soccer player who represented Australia as a member of the Matildas (the Australian Women's Football Team) and captained Melbourne Victory in the Australian W-League.

After representing Australia in the 2003 FIFA Women's World Cup and the 2004 Athens Olympic Games, Karp retired from football to focus on a career in the law.

== Football career ==
=== Early and personal life ===
Karp was born in 1981 in Perth, and is Jewish. She relocated to Canberra in 1998 and later moved to Melbourne. Her father, Moshe was born in Israel and worked as a treasurer for Western Australia's State Zionist Council.

She began her football career competing in the premier boys leagues in Perth. Initially Karp was denied entry to the boys league, however when her brother's team did not have enough players, she was offered a chance to compete. After proving herself and kicking the winning goal of the match, Karp was invited to remain on the team. Karp continued to play in Perth's premier boys league from age 7 until age 17, when she relocated to Canberra.

=== International career ===
Karp represented Australia at a youth level as a member of the Australian Under 16 Squad (1995–97), the Australian Under 19 Team (1998), and the Australian Schoolgirls Team (1997, named Fairest and Best).

Karp was first selected to play for the Matildas in 2002 at age 20 for the Matildas' tour to Canada and the US, becoming the first Western Australian field player to play for the Australian team since 1996. During her football career, Karp accumulated 27 'caps' for her country.

Highlights of Karp's career included her performance in the Nike 2002 Women's U.S. Cup and in the FIFA Women's World Cup 2003, throughout which she was a 'starting eleven' player for the Matildas.

Karp was also a member, at the age of 22, of the 2004 Athens Olympic Games Women's Soccer Team, which placed fifth in the Olympic competition.

=== Club career ===
Karp competed for her home state of WA in national championships from the age of 11 in under 16 national competition, age 12 in the under 19 age category, and age 14 in senior national competition.

When the Women's National Soccer League was formed, Karp was drafted to play for the Canberra Eclipse (1996). Karp later played for South Australia, (Runner-up League Winners 1997/1998), before returning to the Canberra Eclipse for a further five seasons (League Winners 2001/2002, Julie Dolan Medal runner up 2002). Karp returned to Perth to play for the Western Waves in 2004.

Karp held an Australian Institute of Sport Scholarship from 2002 until the end of 2004, and various state and territory sports scholarships during her club career.

In 2005, Karp retired from football to focus on a career in law. However, in 2008, she returned to the game to captain the Melbourne Victory Women's Team in the inaugural season of the Westfield W-League. Karp also competed for Melbourne Victory in the 2009/10 season.

== Legal career ==
Tal Karp graduated from the Australian National University (ANU) in 2006 with a Bachelor of Laws with First Class Honours and the Blackburn Medal for Research in Law. Karp also completed a Bachelor of Arts (History). Following university, Karp went on to complete her Articles of Clerkship at Mallesons Stephen Jacques (now King and Wood Mallesons) in Melbourne, before undertaking an Associateship with Justice Hayne of the High Court of Australia. Karp has held senior legal practice, policy, strategy and advisory roles and regularly appears as an advocate in complex civil and criminal matters. In 2014, she appeared as junior for Victoria Legal Aid in Victoria's first Guideline Judgment.

=== Other roles ===
Karp is a board director of Football Federation Victoria and a member of the Australian Institute of Company Directors. She has previously served as a Tribunal Member for Football Federation Victoria. She is also a qualified coach, holding AFC 'B' Licence Accreditation.

== Awards and accolades ==
=== Sporting awards ===
- Named 'most valuable player', Under 16 Australian national competition, 1997
- Named 'fairest and best player', Australian Schoolgirls Team, 1997
- Julie Dolan Medal runner up, Football Federation Australia, 2002 (awarded to the Most Valuable Australian Women's Football Player)
- Australian Institute of Sport Scholarship, 2002-2004
- Maccabi Sportswoman of the Year, 2008
- Hall of Fame (for contribution to sport) Maccabi Western Australia, 2010
- Hall of Fame (for contribution to sport) Maccabi Victoria, 2011

=== Academic awards ===
- Cindy Sheu Peace and International Friendship Scholarship, 1999
- NSW Bar Association Human Rights Prize, 2004
- Australian National University, Blackburn Medal for Research in Law, 2005
- Chancellors Letter of Commendation for Academic Excellence for advocacy performance for the Australian National University in the Philip C. Jessup International Law Moot Court Competition, 2005

== See also ==
- List of select Jewish football (association; soccer) players
