= Epping Stadium =

Soccer ground in Melbourne, Victoria

- Interactive map of Epping Stadium
- Location: Epping, Victoria
- Coordinates: 37°37′30″S 145°1′29″E
- Owner: City of Whittlesea
- Capacity: 10,000 (1,000 seated)
- Surface: Grass

Construction
- Opened: 1999
- Cost: A$5,000,000 (equivalent to $9,302,154 in 2022)

Tenants
- Melbourne Victory Youth (Y-League) & (NPL VIC); Melbourne Victory Women (2008-2022); Whittlesea Ranges FC; Whittlesea United SC

Epping Stadium is an Australian soccer ground on Harvest Home Rd in Epping, a suburb of Melbourne, Victoria. Opened in 1999 the stadium has a capacity of 10,000, with approximately 1000 seats in its sole grandstand. The venue was host to several National Soccer League matches during the final days of Carlton SC, and has also hosted A-League clubs Melbourne Heart and Melbourne Victory in pre-season matches, as well as W-League Matches and National Youth League matches. The stadium will be host to Melbourne Victory Youth home matches for the 2016 NPL Victoria season.
