= Maika Ruyter-Hooley =

Australian soccer player

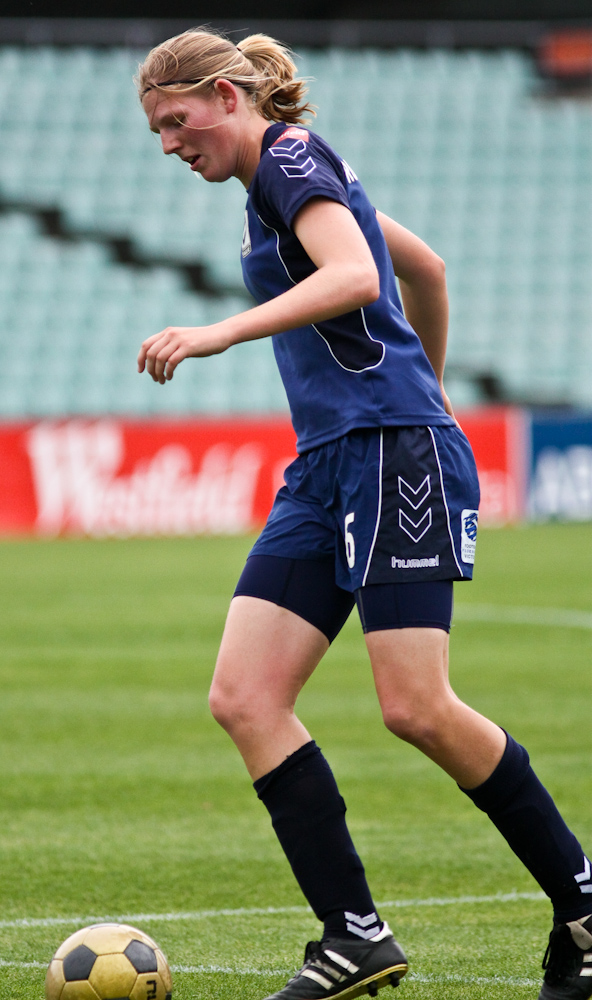
- Ruyter-Hooley playing for Melbourne Victory in 2008

Personal information
- Date of birth: 4 December 1987 (age 38)
- Place of birth: Bendigo, Australia
- Height: 1.83 m (6 ft 0 in)
- Position: Defender

Senior career*
Years	Team	Apps	(Gls)
2008–2015	Melbourne Victory	57	(2)
- * Club domestic league appearances and goals as of 13 September 2014

Maika Ruyter-Hooley (born 4 December 1987) is an Australian football (soccer) player, who last played for Melbourne Victory in the Australian W-League. She hails from Bendigo.
