= Rebecca Tegg =

New Zealand footballer

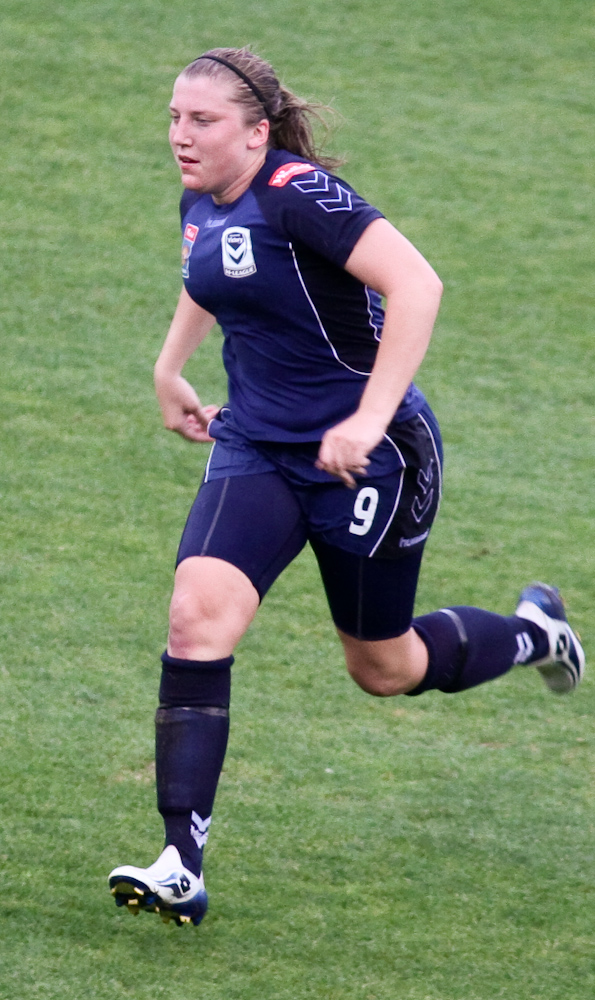

Personal information
- Full name: Rebecca Tegg
- Date of birth: 18 December 1985 (age 40)
- Place of birth: Auckland, New Zealand
- Height: 1.71 m (5 ft 7 in)
- Position: Striker

Senior career*
| Years | Team | Apps | (Gls) |
| 2008–2009 | Melbourne Victory | 10 | (1) |

International career^{‡}
| 2007– | New Zealand | 10 | (0) |
- * Club domestic league appearances and goals ‡ National team caps and goals as of 15 January 2009

Rebecca Tegg (born 18 December 1985) is an association football player who represented New Zealand at international level.

Tegg made her full Football Ferns debut in a 0–3 loss to Australia on 19 July 2007, and represented New Zealand at the 2007 FIFA Women's World Cup finals in China, where they lost to Brazil 0–5, Denmark (0-2) and China (0-2).

Tegg was also included in the New Zealand squad for the 2008 Summer Olympics where they drew with Japan (2-2) before losing to Norway (0-1) and Brazil (0-4).

Tegg formally played for Melbourne Victory in the Australian W-League.

Tegg has a master's degree from Auckland University of Technology, with a thesis examining a soccer intervention for children.
