= Marlies Oostdam =

New Zealand footballer

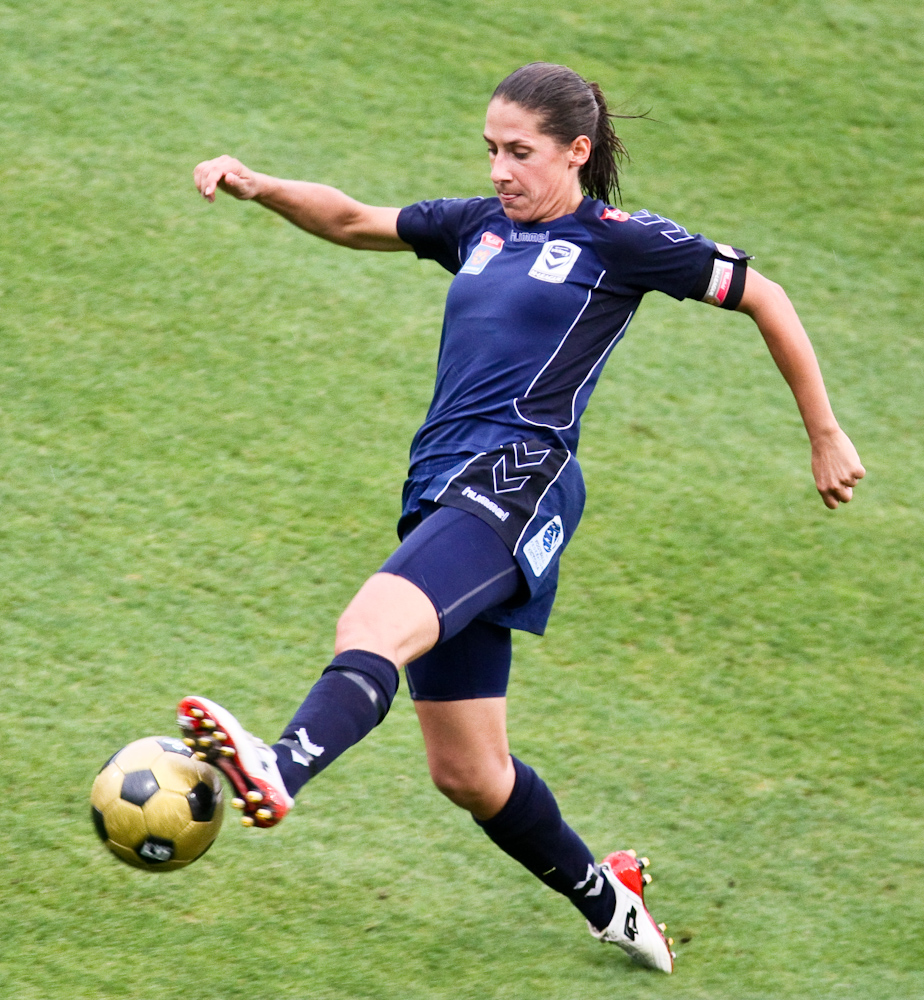

Personal information
- Date of birth: 29 July 1977 (age 49)
- Place of birth: Haarlem, Netherlands
- Height: 1.70 m (5 ft 7 in)
- Position: Defender

Team information
- Current team: Franklin United FC, Auckland, NZ
- Number: 27

Senior career*
| Years | Team | Apps | (Gls) |
| 2008–2011 | Melbourne Victory | 29 | (2) |

International career^{‡}
| 1996–2009 | New Zealand | 33 | (0) |
- * Club domestic league appearances and goals ‡ National team caps and goals as of 12 June 2009

Marlies Oostdam (born 29 July 1977 in Haarlem, Netherlands) is a football (soccer) player who represented New Zealand at international level. She emigrated from the Netherlands to New Zealand in 1985.

Oostdam made her full Football Ferns debut in a 0–3 loss to Australia on 24 March 1996, and represented New Zealand at the 2007 FIFA Women's World Cup finals in China, where they lost to Brazil (0–5), Denmark (0–2) and China (0–2).

Oostdam was also included in the New Zealand squad for the 2008 Summer Olympics where they drew with Japan (2–2) before losing to Norway (0–1) and Brazil (0–4).

Oostdam formally played for Melbourne Victory in the Australian W-League.
