= Laura Spiranovic =

Australian soccer player (born 1991)

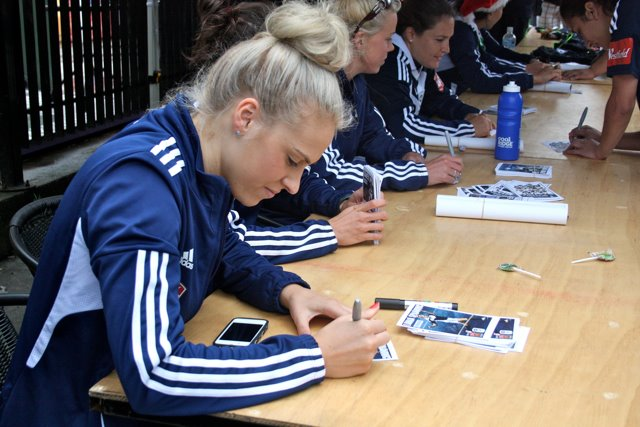
- Spiranovic signs an autograph for a supporter during the club's Family Day at Luna Park.

Personal information
- Full name: Laura Kate Spiranovic
- Date of birth: 18 November 1991 (age 34)
- Place of birth: Geelong, Australia
- Height: 1.74 m (5 ft 9 in)
- Position: Forward

Team information
- Current team: Melbourne Victory
- Number: 13

Youth career
- North Geelong Warriors
- GRFA

Senior career*
Years	Team	Apps	(Gls)
- North Geelong Warriors
2005–2007	GRFA		
2007–2011	South Melbourne		
2011–2013	Melbourne Victory	14	(5)
2013	South Melbourne		
2013–2014	Melbourne Victory	5	(0)
2015	Ashburton United		
2015–2018	Melbourne Victory	26	(3)
2016–2018	Geelong Galaxy United	69	(28)
2019–	ŽNK Split	0	(0)
- * Club domestic league appearances and goals as of 12 February 2019

Laura Spiranovic (Croatian: Špiranović; born 18 November 1991) is an Australian soccer player who plays for Croatian Women's First Football League club ŽNK Split. She is the sister of fellow Australian soccer player Matthew Spiranovic.

== Career ==
Spiranovic is a North Geelong Warriors junior.

In October 2011, Spiranovic signed with Melbourne Victory for the 2011–12 W-League season. Her first appearance in the 2011–12 season came in a 2–0 victory against Perth Glory on 22 October, where she was substituted onto the field in the 74th minute.

In November 2015, Spiranovic was announced as new club Geelong Galaxy United FC's inaugural signing ahead of the 2016 Women's National Premier League season.

In January 2019, Spiranovic signed for Croatian Women's First Football League club ŽNK Split.

Spiranovic is the only North Geelong Warriors player in history to win a top flight League title in Australia and overseas. She won the W-League with Melbourne Victory and the Croatian League with ZNK Split.
