= Brittany Baxter =

Canadian soccer player (born 1985)

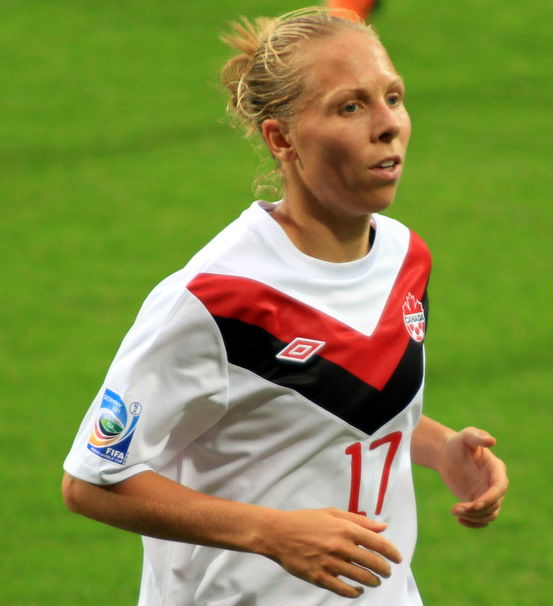
- Baxter with Canada in 2011

Personal information
- Full name: Brittany Amanda Baxter
- Date of birth: September 5, 1985 (age 41)
- Place of birth: Vancouver, British Columbia, Canada
- Height: 1.73 m (5 ft 8 in)
- Positions: Midfielder; forward

College career
| Years | Team | Apps | (Gls) |
| 2003–2006 | Nebraska Cornhuskers | 71 | (41) |

Senior career*
| Years | Team | Apps | (Gls) |
| 2004–2006 | Vancouver Whitecaps | 17 | (4) |
| 2008–2009 | Melbourne Victory | 9 | (2) |
| 2009 | Piteå IF | 7 | (0) |
| 2010 | SG Essen-Schönebeck | 0 | (0) |
| 2014 | Seattle Sounders Women | 3 | (0) |

International career^{‡}
| 2002–2004 | Canada U-19 | 32 | (16) |
| 2002–2014 | Canada | 132 | (5) |
Medal record
Women's soccer
Representing Canada
Olympic Games
| Bronze medal – third place | 2012 London | Team |
Pan American Games
| Bronze medal – third place | 2007 Rio de Janeiro | Team |
| Gold medal – first place | 2011 Guadalajara | Team |
- * Club domestic league appearances and goals as of April 26, 2015 ‡ National team caps and goals as of November 26, 2014

Brittany Amanda Baxter (née Timko) (born September 5, 1985) is a Canadian retired soccer player who played professionally for five different clubs and earned 132 caps with the Canadian National Team.

== Club career ==
Baxter's first senior club team was Vancouver Whitecaps Women. She also attended the University of Nebraska–Lincoln, playing on the school's soccer team from 2003 to 2007 and graduating in May 2007. She then signed for Melbourne Victory of Australia's newly formed W-League in October 2008, linking up with her former coach Matt Shepherd.

In the first half of the 2009–10 season Baxter played in Sweden's Damallsvenskan league for Piteå IF, and in the second played for SG Essen-Schönebeck. She left Essen-Schönebeck during the summer of 2010.

Baxter was signed by the Seattle Sounders Women in the W-League on May 2, 2014.

== International career ==
Baxter enjoyed international success at the youth level, where she played mostly as a forward. She earned the Adidas Golden Shoe as top scorer at the 2004 FIFA U-19 Women's World Championship with seven goals in four games.

Baxter won the gold medal at the 2011 Pan American Games soccer tournament when Canada defeated Brazil 4–3 in penalty kicks.

Baxter was a member of the two Olympic Teams for Canada, in 2008 and 2012. She won a bronze medal in 2012, when Canada defeated France 1–0 in the bronze medal match.

Baxter played in the FIFA Women's World Cup in 2007 and 2011.

Baxter retired from professional soccer following the 2014 season. She finished her international career with 132 caps and 5 goals. She was honoured by Canada Soccer in a halftime ceremony during a Canada vs. United States friendly on November 9, 2017, alongside teammates Chelsea Stewart and Kelly Parker.

== Coaching ==
Since retiring from professional soccer, Baxter has moved into coaching. She is the Technical Director at the Port Moody Soccer Club in British Columbia.

== Honours ==
- 2022: Canada Soccer Hall of Fame

== Personal life ==
Baxter and her husband Sean, have two children, a son, Johnny and a daughter Zoe.

== See also ==
- List of women's footballers with 100 or more international caps
