= Selin Kuralay =

Australian soccer player

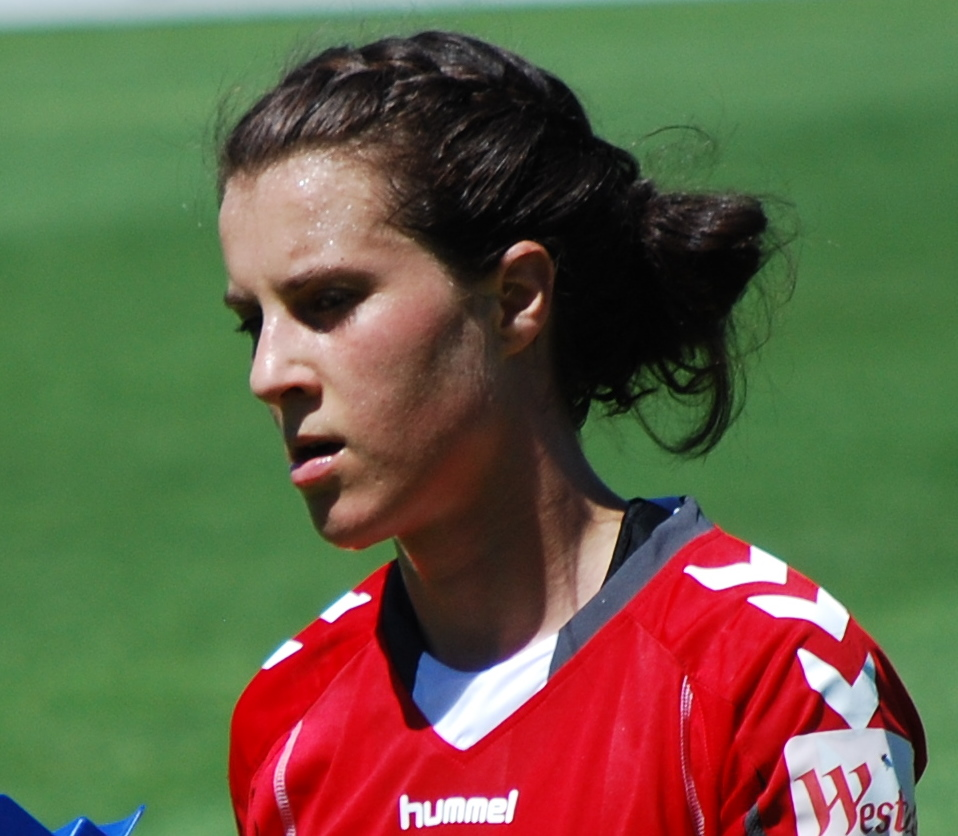
- Kuralay with Adelaide United in 2010

Personal information
- Date of birth: 25 January 1985 (age 41)
- Place of birth: Melbourne, Australia
- Height: 5 ft 5 in (1.65 m)
- Position: Midfielder

Team information
- Current team: Melbourne Victory
- Number: 14

Youth career
- North Coburg
- Ringwood City
- Box Hill United

College career
Years	Team	Apps	(Gls)
2005–2006	Florida State Seminoles	50	(29)
2008	SCAD Bees	15	(10)

Senior career*
Years	Team	Apps	(Gls)
1999–2003	Victoria Vision / Box Hill Inter		
2004	Victoria Institute of Sport		
2004	Qld Academy of Sport	?	(2)
2005	Hampton Roads Piranhas	12	(0)
- Box Hill Inter
2008–2009	Melbourne Victory	12	(3)
2010–2011	Adelaide United	9	(1)
2015–	Melbourne Victory	2	(1)

International career^{‡}
2002–2004	Australia U-19		
2004–	Australia	22	(2)
- * Club domestic league appearances and goals as of 5 March 2017 ‡ National team caps and goals as of 3 July 2011

Selin Kuralay (born 25 January 1985 in Melbourne, Australia) is an Australian soccer player of Turkish ancestry. She plays at national league level for Australian W-League team Melbourne Victory.

== Club career ==
=== Junior football ===
Kuralay took up football as a six-year-old, playing for North Coburg. She later played with Ringwood City and Box Hill United. In 2001, she was jointly awarded (with Spase Dilevski) the Weinstein Medal as Victorian Junior Player of the Year. She is the only female footballer to have won the medal.

=== WNSL ===
Kuralay made her debut at national league level in 1999 when she played for Victoria Vision in the Australian Women's National Soccer League. She won the Rising Star award for the league in the 2000–01 season.

In 2004 Kuralay played for the Queensland Academy of Sport in the WNSL, scoring two goals.

=== W-League (USA) ===
In 2005 Kuralay played 12 matches for the Hampton Roads Piranhas in the American W-League.

=== College soccer ===
==== Florida State University ====
Kuralay began her college soccer career for Florida State University in the Atlantic Coast Conference. In 2005, her first season for FSU, she scored 16 goals and made nine assists both of which were records for a first year player. Kuralay was a first team National Soccer Coaches Association of America All-America team member. She was a semifinalist in the 2005 Hermann Trophy. She was one of 11 Soccer America Magazine MVPs for 2005.

In 2006, her second season, she tied the FSU record for game-winning goals. She was also selected in Soccer Buzz Magazine's All-America team

==== Savannah College of Art and Design ====
Kuralay played in 2008 for Savannah College of Art and Design in The Sun Conference. In her only season at SCAD she scored 10 goals and laid off five assists in 15 matches. She was named in the 2008 National Association of Intercollegiate Athletics All-America team.

=== W-League (Australia) ===
In 2008 Kuralay joined the Melbourne Victory. She scored two goals on her debut to help Victory defeat Adelaide United.

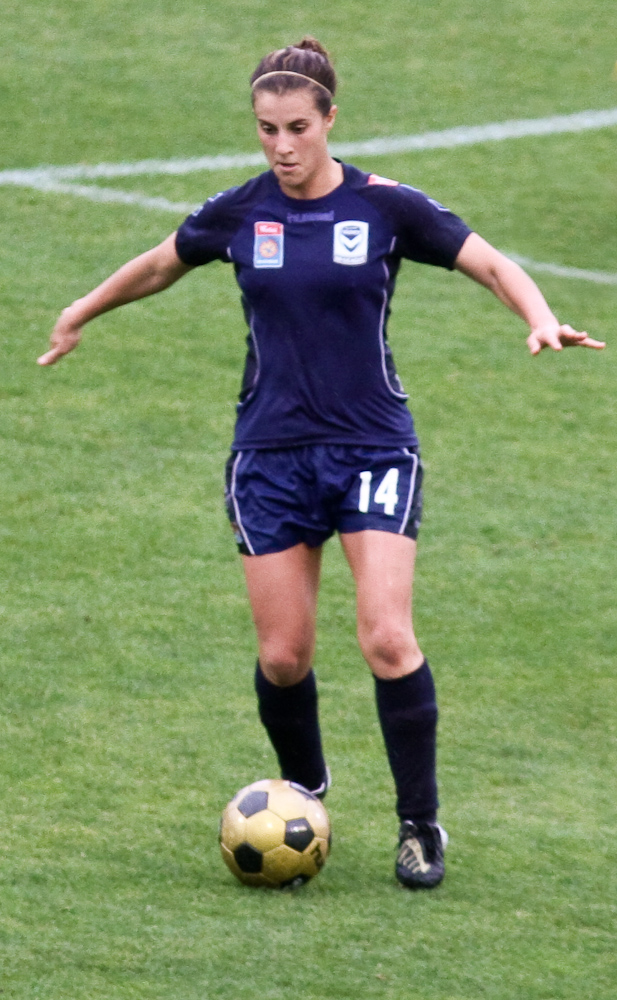
Kuralay playing for Melbourne in 2009.

== International career ==
=== Under 19 ===
In 2002 Kuralay played for the Australian team at the FIFA U-19 Women's World Championship in Canada. In May 2002 she scored five goals in Australia's 13–0 win in a World Cup Qualifying match against Samoa.

She was selected for her second U-19 World Championship in 2004, which was held in Thailand.

=== Senior women's team ===
After making her debut against New Zealand in February 2004, Kuralay played 22 times for the Australia women's national football (soccer) team and scored two goals.

Kuralay played three matches for the Australian women's football team at the Athens Olympics and also represented Australia at the 2002 and 2004 FIFA Under-19 Women's World Championship finals.

== Honours ==
=== Individual ===
- Weinstein Medal – Joint Winner – 2001
- Women's National Soccer League Rising Star – Winner – 2001
- National Soccer Coaches Association of America All-America team member
- Hermann Trophy Semifinalist – 2005.
- Soccer America Magazine MVP – 2005
- Soccer Buzz Magazine – All-America team – 2006
- National Association of Intercollegiate Athletics All-America team – 2008
