= Louisa Bisby =

Australian football player

Personal information
- Full name: Louisa Rebecca Elisabeth Bisby
- Date of birth: 1 June 1979 (age 47)
- Place of birth: Royal Leamington Spa, England
- Height: 1.78 m (5 ft 10 in)
- Position: Midfielder

Youth career
- Aston Villa

Senior career*
Years	Team	Apps	(Gls)
1996–1998	ITC Victoria		
1998–1999	SASI Buffalo Pirates		
1999–2002	Victoria Vision	29	(3)
2002	Sichuan Dahe		
2002–2004	Victoria Vision	20	(3)
2004–2006	Brauweiler Pulheim		
2008–2013	Melbourne Victory	22	(1)

International career
2007	Australia	1	(0)
- * Club domestic league appearances and goals

Louisa Bisby (born 1 June 1979) is an Australian soccer player who played for Melbourne Victory in the Australian W-League, and with the Matildas representing Australia. A knee injury ended Bisby's 2012 season with Melbourne Victory in October.

Bisby was born in England and arrived in Australia at the age of 15.
