= Gülcan Koca =

Turkish football player (born 1990)

Personal information
- Full name: Gülcan Koca
- Date of birth: 4 September 1990 (age 36)
- Place of birth: Melbourne, Australia
- Height: 1.69 m (5 ft 6 1/2 in)
- Position: Defender

Senior career*
Years	Team	Apps	(Gls)
2009–2018	Melbourne Victory	66	(2)

International career^{‡}
2010–2012	Turkey	14	(0)
- * Club domestic league appearances and goals as of 20 February 2018 ‡ National team caps and goals as of 27 January 2014

Gülcan Koca (born 4 September 1990) is a retired Turkish-Australian women's football defender, who last played for Australian W-League team Melbourne Victory, and for Calder United in the Football Federation Victoria. She was a member of the Turkey women's national football team from 2010 to 2013.

== Club career ==
Koca played for Melbourne Victory for nine W-League seasons from 2010 to 2018. She was considered as one of the most versatile players on the team, as she was able to play as both an attacker and defender. She won the W-League Championship with the Victory in the 2013–14 season.

On September 13, 2018, Koca announced her retirement from professional football. She continues to play semi professionally with Calder united SC in the NPLW in victoria

== International career ==
Koca was born in Melbourne to Turkish parents. She was called up to the Turkey women's national team in June 2010, after a worldwide search to find players with Turkish heritage. Koca made her debut for Turkey on June 23, 2010, at the 2011 World Cup Qualifying match against Austria team. She appeared in Euro 2013 qualifying matches. Koca has been capped 16 times by the national team.

== Honors ==
Melbourne Victory

- W-League Championship: 2013–14
