= Melbourne Victory FC (women) =

Melbourne Victory Women
- Full name: Melbourne Victory Football Club
- Nickname: Victory
- Short name: MVFC
- Founded: 2008; 18 years ago
- Ground: AAMI Park; The Home of the Matildas
- Capacity: 30,050; 3,000
- Chairman: John Dovaston
- Manager: Jeff Hopkins
- League: A-League Women
- 2025–26: 6th of 11
- Website: melbournevictory.com.au
Home colours	Away colours

Melbourne Victory Football Club is an Australian professional women's association football team affiliated with Melbourne Victory FC and Football Federation Victoria based in Melbourne, Victoria. Founded in 2008, the team is one of the representatives of Melbourne in Australia's top-tier domestic competition – the A-League Women.

The Club plays at two home grounds. The Club's primary home ground is the Home of The Matildas. The club also plays home games at the in double header matches before the men's team at the Melbourne Rectangular Stadium, currently known as AAMI Park for sponsorship purposes, a 30,050-seat stadium on Olympic Boulevard in Melbourne's city centre. The Victory has previously played its home matches at other stadiums throughout Melbourne and surrounding areas, including Lakeside Stadium, Docklands Stadium and CB Smith Reserve.

== History ==
=== Establishment ===
Following on from the previous top-division Women's National Soccer League, Melbourne Victory Women linked with the Hyundai A-League men's club but run by Football Federation Victoria (FFV), was a foundation club of the Westfield W-League. With a strong roster boasting Australia's number one goalkeeper Melissa Barbieri and former Matildas star Tal Karp as captain, expectations were high.

=== 2008–09: Inaugural season ===
Early signs were positive in the first season with New Zealand international Marlies Oostdam scoring the club's first goal as Victory won their first competitive fixture, defeating Central Coast Mariners 2–0. Despite being on top of the table at the conclusion of Round 3, the next few rounds were lean for Melbourne, and it found itself in the position of needing a win in the final round to make the finals series. With the final round match in the balance, Central Coast Mariners came back to haunt Victory with goals in the 89th and 90th minutes to deny the Victory a play-off spot in the inaugural year. Melissa Barbieri was awarded Goalkeeper of the Year by the league.

=== 2009 ===
The second season proved even more painful as once again Melbourne's finals prospects came down to a last-round showdown, this time against Perth Glory. Needing only a draw to claim fourth spot, late goals again cost Victory as Perth scored in the 81st and 87th meaning the Victorians missed out on finals to Canberra via goal difference.

=== 2010–11 ===
2010–11 season saw a change of personnel for Melbourne Victory with new coach Vicki Linton taking charge of a re-shuffled squad. Adjusting to a new system and new teammates, it was a slow start with the team having to wait until Round 4 to claim its first win of the season before finishing the regular season off with a five-match undefeated run. Finishing in fourth spot, Victory made the finals but succumbed to a strong Sydney FC team 5–1. The team was not quite ready for a title challenge but a maiden finals campaign was an important step forward. This also saw the club win its first silverware with a win over Canberra United, seeing it awarded the OCRF Trophy while also taking out the W-League Fair Play Award.

=== 2011–12 ===
Melbourne Victory went the entire season undefeated at home and finished fourth in the season of the Westfield W-League. They lost 1–0 to Canberra in the semi-final. Steph Catley, Ashley Brown, Brianna Davey and Katrina Gorry all made their Matildas debuts while Catley and Brown won Footballer of the Year (Australian Football Fan Awards) and W-League Young Player of the Season respectively. Melbourne Victory also won its second successive W-League Fair Play Award, sharing with Canberra, and retained the OCRF Trophy.

=== 2012–13 ===
Hoping to build on their strong 2011/12 season, the Victory got off to a shaky start in 2012/13 with head coach Vicki Linton resigning only weeks before the season was to kick-off. With her departure Darren Tan was appointed as interim coach until former Gold Coast United coach Mike Mulvey was given the job just days before the opening round. Having only a squad of 12 players registered going into the match, Melbourne Victory was forced to sign three more players due to FFA regulations before going on to lose 2–0 to Perth. Despite another loss in Round 2 leaving the team on the bottom of the ladder, a combination of international signings – including stars Petra Larsson and Jessica Fishlock – and players beginning to understand Mulvey's playing system led to a turnaround in form.

With the league's best defence, Melbourne finished the regular season in third place losing only a single match after Round 2. Even so, the team had to contend with more issues as Mulvey left following Round 9 to take up an A-League contract with Brisbane Roar, while Fishlock's guest contract ended after Round 10. A dramatic semi-final win over Perth Glory extended the side's historic undefeated streak to seven and allowed it to host the 2012/13 Westfield W-League grand final at AAMI Park, although it fell to Sydney FC 3–1. Despite this, Steph Catley was awarded W-League Young Player of the Year and Mike Mulvey W-League Coach of the Year.

=== 2013–14: First Championship ===
Victory began the 2013–14 season by signing Lisa De Vanna and Emma Checker. With these additions as well as the signings of Swedish footballer Jessica Samuelsson and Katie Hoyle Victory was building toward Championship Season. Victory would finish third place in the regular season with an equal club record points tally with 23 points. Victory Would beat second place Sydney FC thanks to a penalty goal from Lauren Barnes in the 71st minute of the match to qualify them to the 2014 W-League Grand Final (February). Melbourne Victory would play Brisbane Roar at Lakeside Stadium, in front of a crowd of 2,504 on 23 February 2014. Victory would win the match 2-0 thanks to goals from Lisa De Vanna and Lauren Barnes. this would be Victory's First W-League Championship. Lisa De Vanna was also named Female Footballer of the Year and Stephanie Catley were awarded Female U20 Footballer of the Year. Coach Dave Edmondson departed the club following Grand Final to join Bristol Academy

=== 2014: Montemurro era ===
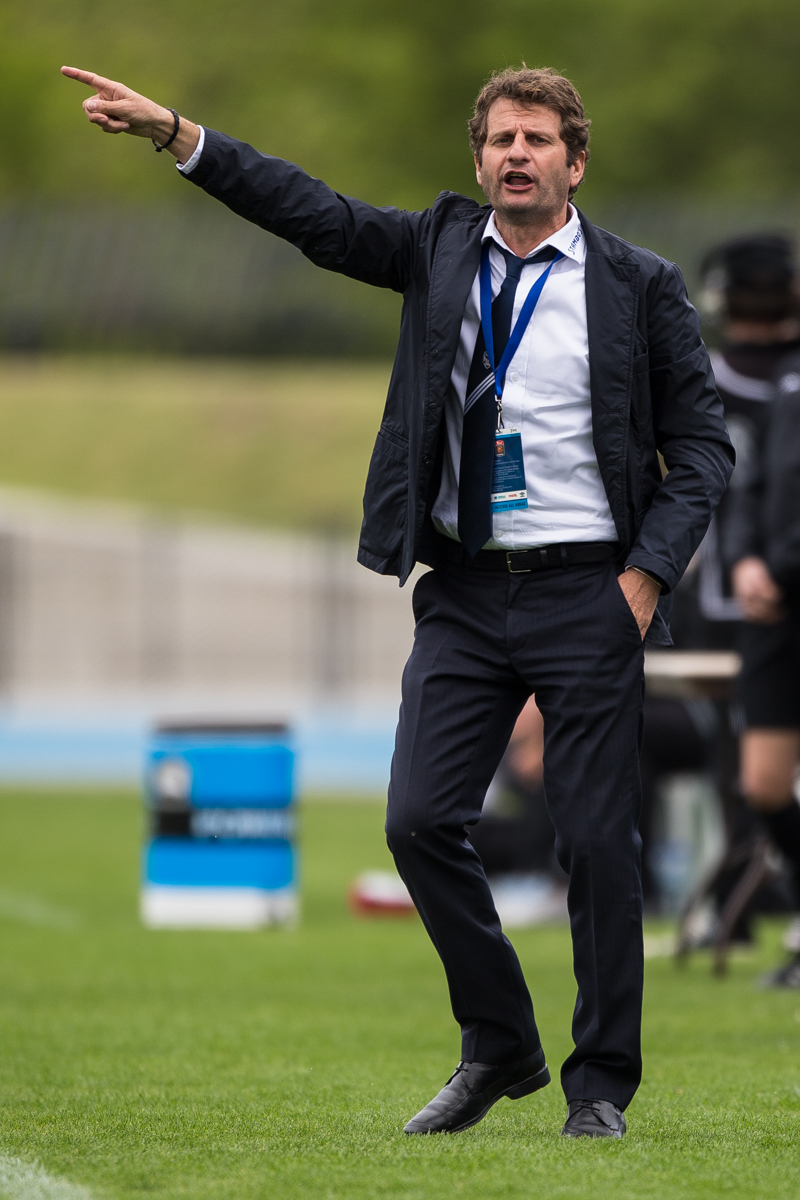
Joe Montemurro coaching Melbourne Victory in the home defeat versus Perth Glory at Lakeside Stadium on November 2, 2014.

Joe Montemurro would become Victory's new coach. Victory would then compete in the 2014 W-League season. Due to Australia hosting the 2015 AFC Asian Cup, the season was scheduled to take place entirely in the 2014 calendar year instead of continuing in to 2015. The club would place second in the regular season with 20 points. victory would play Canberra United. the match would finnish 0-0 after extra time and Victory would lose 4-5 in a penalty shootout due to Gülcan Koca missing Victory's final penalty. Coach Joe Montemurro would depart the club after the season to join Melbourne City.

=== 2015–16: Struggles for Victory ===
After Joe Montemurro's departure the club appointed championship winning coach Dave Edmondson to manage Victory. Melbourne Victory would play in the 2015–16 W-League season. Melbourne Victory would finish last in the regular season with a record low points tally of 7 points and a record low 2 wins across the whole season. Victory failed to make the finals series and was the worst season Victory had at that point. Dave Edmondson would depart the club as coach at the end of the season.

=== Hopkins era (2016–present) ===
==== Beginning Struggles (2016-2018) ====
The Hopkins era began after the 2015–16 season, when Jeff Hopkins took over the vacant position following the departure of Dave Edmondson. Hopkins came to the job at Victory with "a wealth of experience both as a coach and a player" through his coaching performance with Brisbane Roar, winning multiple pieces of silverware including a double in his first season. Hopkins would sign Rachel Alonso, Alex Cheal, Lia Privitelli, and Ayesha Norrie to begin building a squad for the future. Hopkins' first two seasons would start off Shakey with another ninth place finish with a total of 9 points in the 2016–17 W-League season and a seventh place finish in the 2017-18 W-League Season. Hopkins struggled in these first two seasons but major improvements for the team to come.

==== First Premiership (2018–2019) ====
Victory would go into the 2018-19 Season by signing Emily Gielnik from Brisbane Roar and Grace Maher from Canberra United. Hopkins would also loan in American duo from Orlando Pride, Dani Weatherholt and Christine Nairn. Despite failing to make finals since the 2014 season Hopkins' Victory was predicted by media to finish in the top four, as well as former player Gülcan Koca suggesting they could win the premiership/championship double. Victory would start the season playing Adelaide United in a nil-all draw, despite Victory's 21 shots at goal. Victory would gain there first win after a 2-1 win against Newcastle Jets. A 2–1 victory over Perth Glory at Dorrien Gardens secured the club's first W-League premiership. The Victory entered the match needing a point to win the trophy after Brisbane Roar were unexpectedly defeated. This would be the clubs First W-League Premiership for the club. Victory would then play fourth place Perth Glory in the semi final. The match reached a 2-2 draw at regular time, but a completed hattrick from Sam Kerr during extra time gave Perth Glory the 4–2 win. Victory's Performance in the regular season would qualify them to the 2019 AFC Women's Club Championship.

Before the beginning of the season Hopkins signed New Zealander Annalie Longo as well as signing Jenna McCormick and Melissa Maizels. Hopkins would begin the 2019-20 W-League Season with a 3-0 loss against Sydney FC and a 3-2 win Against Brisbane Roar. Victory would then compete in the 2019 AFC Women's Club Championship. Victory would begin with a 4-0 loss against Incheon Hyundai Steel Red Angels. Victory would then draw 1-1 against Chinese club Jiangsu Suning with a goal from Grace Maher and the team would finish its club woman's championship campaign with a 5-0 loss against Japanese club Nippon TV Beleza. Melbourne Victory would finish fourth place in the club championship with only one point. Hopkins' Victory squad would continue the season by finishing second in the regular season and making finals. In the finals series Melbourne Victory would play Sydney FC in the semi final. Sydney FC would defeat Hopkins' side thanks to a 14th minute goal by Veronica Latsko.

==== Two Championships in a row (2020–2022) ====
Hopkins would go into the 2020-21 season by signing American duo Catherine Zimmerman and Kayla Morrison. Lisa De Vanna would also re-join the club alongside new signings of Kyra Cooney-Cross, Paige Zois, and New Zealander Claudia Bunge. Victory would begin there season with a nil-all draw against Brisbane Roar followed up by a 6-0 win over Melbourne City in a Melbourne derby. Victory would continue a relatively successful campaign placing third in the regular season and qualifying themselves for finals. Melbourne Victory would play second placed Brisbane Roar in a semi final in Brisbane. Victory would win 6-3 thanks to a hattrick by Melina Ayres. This win qualified Victory to the 2021 W-League Grand Final. The match was played between Sydney FC and Melbourne Victory at Netstrata Jubilee Stadium on 11 April 2021. The match would end nil-all after 90 minutes leading to extra time. The match would finish in a 1-0 win after a 120th minute goal by Kyra Cooney-Cross. this was Victory's second championship. Hopkins would extend his contract with the club after this championship season.

For the 2021-22 season the W-League was Rebranded by Australian Professional Leagues to the A-League Women. After extending his contract Hopkins would then sign Alana Murphy. On 5 October 2021 Casey Dumont would also sign for the club. The 2021-22 season would begin with a 5-1 win against Adelaide United. This result was followed up by the club signing Alex Chidiac on loan from Japanese club JEF United Chiba on 9 December 2021. Victory would continue the season strong including a 5-0 win over Western Sydney Wanderers. Victory would finish the regular season by finishing fourth place with a points tally of 24 points. Melbourne Victory would play Adelaide United in the semi-final at Coopers Stadium on 13 March 2022. Goals from Lia Privitelli and Melina Ayres would lead to a 2-1 win leading Victory to play Melbourne City in the Preliminary Final. A 3-1 win for Victory at AAMI Park in front of 1,306 people in attendance, would qualify Victory into the 2022 A-League Women grand final. The match was played at Netstrata Jubilee Stadium against Sydney FC, on 27 March 2022 in front of a crowd of 5,027 people. the match was a strong contest for both sides with no goals scored in the first half. In the beginning of the second half Amy Jackson would score a goal in the 49th minute followed up by a goal by Catherine Zimmerman in the 64th minute leading to a 2-0 lead. Cortnee Vine would score a consolation goal for Sydney FC. The match would end in a 2-1 win for Victory. the result would win Victory the clubs third Championship. Victory would win back to back championships. Casey Dumont's great goalkeeping performance in the grand final would earn her player of the match.

==== Close to the top but not there (2022–2025) ====
Hopkins would go into the 2022–23 A-League Woman Season by re-signing Alex Chidiac and signing Jessika Nash, Beattie Goad, and Elise Kellond-Knight. Victory would finish the A-League Women season placing fourth with a point tally of 29 points. Victory would play in the semi final against third placed Melbourne City at Casey Fields on 15 April 2023. the match would end in a 3–3 draw after extra time meaning the match went to penalties. Melbourne Victory won 4–1 on penalties qualifying Victory to the Preliminary final. Victory would play first placed Sydney FC at Allianz Stadium on 22 April 2023. After a long game for both sides a 89th Madison Haley goal to put Sydney FC a goal to win them the match. Victory lost the match 1–0 meaning Victory were eliminated from the finals series. Melina Ayres would finish third place in the Golden boot with 9 goals. Alex Chidiac would earn herself the Julie Dolan Medal for her extraordinary season with the club.

Hopkins would re-sign to his role of coach of the club again for the next two seasons. Hopkins would go into the 2023-24 Season by signing Rachel Lowe, Emma Checker, and Jamilla Rankin. These signings were followed up by the signing of Japanese forward Kurea Okino, as well as signing Ella O'Grady. Victory would start the season Shakey by losing its first two matches against Brisbane Roar and Western United. Victory would get there first win against Adelaide United 2-0 at AAMI Park in front of a crowd of 4,102 on 4 November 2023. On 30 December 2023 the club would announce the return of Alex Chidiac for two and a half seasons. Victory would finish the season fourth placed with a points tally of 36 points and qualify Victory to the finals series. Victory would play Central Coast Mariners in the elimination final on 14 April 2024 at the Home of the Matildas. The match went 120 minuets without a goal, with the match ending nil-all. The match went to penalties and ended in a 4-2 loss for Victory.

Melbourne Victory would go on to play in the 2024-25 A-League Women. The club would begin by signing Alana Jancevski, Nickoletta Flannery from Canberra United, and Sofia Sakalis from Perth Glory. Hopkins would follow this up by signing English defender, Ellie Wilson and New Zealander, Claudia Bunge. Victory would begin the season with a 3-2 win over Adelaide United before losing 3-2 against Melbourne City. Victory would go on to lose only one more match for the rest of the regular season. Victory finished the season in second place despite only losing two matches across the whole season and gaining a record 53 points, this was because rivals Melbourne City finished the season without a single loss. This was Victory's best season by many statistics including points per game. Victory would qualify into the semi final. they would play Adelaide United over two legs. Melbourne Victory won both matches 3-1 leading to a 6-2 aggregate score. This would qualify Victory to the 2025 A-League Women Grand Final. The match was played on 18 May 2025 at AAMI Park against Central Coast Mariners. played in front of a crowd of 6,568 people in attendance both teams put up a good fight in the first half leading to a 0-0 score line at halftime. In the opening minutes of the first half, Isabel Gomez scored a goal to put the Mariners up 1-0. Victory responded by attacking the Mariners goal fiercely with no luck due to the Mariners strong defence. The defence held strong until defender Claudia Bunge scored a goal in the 80th minute off of a corner kick. the goal meant the game finished with a score of 1-1, leading the match to have to go to extra time. In extra time both sides fought hard and had their chances but failed to crate goals. With no goals in extra time the match went to a penalty shootout. Melbourne Victory would take the first penalty kick. Alana Jancevski missed the first penalty kick for Victory, and the rest of the penalties were scored, leading to a "fairytale" win for the Mariners. in reflection to the season Hopkins stated "Looking back over the season, (I'm) extremely proud of the efforts of the team, how the team’s progressed, individuals have progressed, how some of the younger players have done over the season."

== Support ==
The active support group for Melbourne Victory is the Victory Vikings, who also serve as the active support group for Melbourne Victory FC AWT. The group was formed prior to the 2019–20 W-League season by Melbourne Victory supporters who attended the 2019 FIFA Women's World Cup, after they were involved with the Matildas Active Support and enjoyed the experience. Aside from attending matches, the Victory Vikings are also known for announcing statistics on player milestones, as well as posting instant live match updates for Melbourne Victory and AWT matches. The group is notable for their mascot, a large stuffed Homer Simpson doll wearing a Viking helmet that is brought to matches, with players frequently posing with it.

== Players ==
=== Current squad ===
As of 16 October 2026

Note: Flags indicate national team as defined under FIFA eligibility rules; some limited exceptions apply. Players may hold more than one non-FIFA nationality.

No.	Pos.	Nation	Player
1	GK	AUS	Courtney Newbon
2	MF	PHI	Skye Leach
3	DF	NZL	Claudia Bunge (vice-captain)
4	DF	AUS	Chelsea Blissett
7	FW	AUS	Ella O'Grady
8	FW	AUS	Sophie Harding
9	FW	AUS	Holly Furphy
10	MF	AUS	Sienna Saveska
11	FW	AUS	Nicki Flannery
13	DF	PHI	Angela Beard
14	MF	AUS	Alicia Woods
16	DF	SUI	Anna Sutter

No.	Pos.	Nation	Player
17	MF	AUS	Poppy O'Keeffe (scholarship)
18	DF	USA	Kayla Morrison (captain)
19	DF	NZL	Zoe McMeeken
20	FW	AUS	Leyla Hussein (scholarship)
21	FW	AUS	Jasmine Millar (youth)
25	GK	AUS	Ayana Aoyagi
28	FW	AUS	Sienna Techera (scholarship)
30	GK	AUS	Chloe McKenzie (scholarship)
31	GK	AUS	Shaylee Lane (youth)
66	FW	AUS	Alana Jancevski
81	MF	AUS	Grace Maher

== Notable former players ==
Below is a list of notable footballers who have previously played for Melbourne Victory Women. Generally, this means players that have played 50 or more first-class matches for the club. However, some players who have played fewer matches are also included, are the club's integral founding members, were integral members of a championship winning team, have at least one senior international cap or made significant contributions to the club's history.

Australia

- Laura Alleway (2008–09, 2017–20)
- Melissa Barbieri (2008–11, 2015–16)
- Louisa Bisby (2008–13)
- Steph Catley (2009–15)
- Emma Checker (2013–15)
- Alex Chidiac (2021–23)
- Brianna Davey (2010–16)
- Lisa De Vanna (2013–15)
- Casey Dumont (2017–)
- Beattie Goad (2013–15, 2022–)
- Kyra Cooney-Cross (2017–19, 2020–22)
- Katrina Gorry (2009, 2011–012)
- Amy Jackson (2010–13, 2014–15, 2019–)
- Tal Karp (2008–09)
- Elise Kellond-Knight (2022–)
- Selin Kuralay (2008–09)
- Gema Simon (2014–15, 2022–23)

Canada

- Katie Thorlakson (2009)
- Brittany Timko (2008–09)

England

- Natasha Dowie (2013–20)
- Jodie Taylor (2010–12)

New Zealand

- Claudia Bunge (2020–23)
- Katie Hoyle (2013–14)
- Annalie Longo (2019–2021)
- Marlies Oostdam (2008–11)
- Rebekah Stott (2011–13)
- Rebecca Tegg (2008–09)

South Korea

- Jeon Ga-eul (2017–18)

Sweden

- Petra Larsson (2012–13)
- Jessica Samuelsson (2013)

Turkey

- Gülcan Koca (2009–18)

United States

- Lauren Barnes (2014–15)
- Kendall Fletcher (2010–12)
- Haley Hanson (2019–20)
- Christine Nairn (2014–19)

Wales

- Jessica Fishlock (2012)

== Managers ==
Dates	Name	Notes	Honours
26 October 2008 – 5 December 2009	(Australia) Matt Sheppard	Inaugural manager	
3 August 2010 – 7 September 2012	(Australia) Vicki Linton	First manager to take the club to W-League finals	W-League Fair-Play Award (x2): 2010–11 & 2011–12
12 November 2011 – 13 November 2011	(Australia) Michael Edwards	Step-in Manager for one match	
21 October 2012 – 18 December 2012	(England) Mike Mulvey	Departed in Round Ten to join Brisbane Roar in the A-League.	W-League Coach of the Year 2012–13
18 December 2012 – 27 January 2013	(Australia) Fabrizio Soncin	Promoted from Assistant Coach to complete season 2012–13	W-League Premiership Runners-Up 2012–13
5 February 2013 – 23 February 2014	(England) Dave Edmondson	Departed following Grand Final to join Bristol Academy	W-League Champions 2013–14
14 May 2014–March 2015	(Australia) Joe Montemurro	Departed after season to join Melbourne City	
October 2015–January 2016	(England) Dave Edmondson		
17 June 2016–	(Wales) Jeff Hopkins		W-League Premiers 2018–19 W-League Premiership Runners-Up 2019–20 W-League Champions 2020–21 A-League Women Champions 2021–22 A-League Women Premier Runners-Up 2024–25 A-League Women Champion Runner-Up 2024–25

== Honours ==
- W-League/A-League Women:
  - Champions (3): 2013–14, 2020–21, 2021–22
  - Runners-up (2): 2012–13, 2024–25
  - Premiers (1): 2018–19
  - Runners-up (1): 2019–20

== Continental record ==
Season	Competition	Round	Opponent	Home	Away	Aggregate
2019	AFC Women's Club Championship		(South Korea) Incheon Hyundai Steel Red Angels	0–4		4th place
2019	AFC Women's Club Championship		(China) Jiangsu Suning	1–1		4th place
2019	AFC Women's Club Championship		(Japan) Nippon TV Beleza	0–5		4th place

== Year-by-year history ==
Chart of yearly table positions for Melbourne Victory in A-League Women

Melbourne W-League history
Season	Teams	League Position	Finals Position
2008–09	8	5th	–
2009	8	5th	–
2010–11	7	4th	Semi-Finals
2011–12	7	4th	Semi-Finals
2012–13	8	3rd	Finalist
2013–14	8	3rd	Champions
2014	8	2nd	Finalist
2015–16	9	9th	–
2016–17	9	9th	–
2017–18	9	7th	–
2018–19	9	1st	Semi-Finals
2019–20	9	2nd	Semi-Finals
2020–21	9	3rd	Champions
2021–22	10	4th	Champions
2022–23	11	4th	Preliminary Final
2023-24	12	4th	Elimination-final
2024-25	12	2nd	Finalist

== Records and statistics ==
=== Records ===
- Record Win: 0–7 vs Newcastle Jets, Round 13 (Season 2019-20), 23 February 2020
- Record Defeat: 6-0 vs Brisbane Roar, Round 5 (Season 2020-21), 22 January 2021
- Record High Attendance: 8,838 vs Adelaide United, AAMI Park, Melbourne, 26 February 2023
- Most Goals by a Player in a Game: 3
  - Caitlin Friend v Adelaide United, 19 November 2011; v Newcastle Jets, 7 December 2013
  - Jodie Taylor v Perth Glory, 10 December 2011
    Lisa De Vanna v Newcastle Jets, 25 January 2014
  - Amy Jackson v Adelaide United, 12 October 2014
  - Racheal Quigley v Newcastle Jets, 22 November 2014
  - Natasha Dowie v Brisbane Roar, 1 January 2017; v Sydney FC, 25 November 2018
  - Melina Ayres v Brisbane Roar, 4 April 2021; v Melbourne City, 15 April 2023
    Kayla Morrison v Newcastle Jets, 18 December 2022
  - Emily Gielnik (twice)
  - Kennedy White
- Most Wins in a Row: 10 matches – 16 February 2025 to 10 May 2025
- Longest Undefeated Streak: 16 matches – 11 January 2025 to 18 May 2025
- Most Goals in a Regular season: Emily Gielnik – 12 goals, 2024–25 A-League Women

==== Most appearances ====
Amy Jackson holds the record for most appearances with 103 as of April 2023

Last updated 30 April 2023

Competitive, professional matches only.

	Name	Years	League	Finals	AFC Women's Champions League	International Women's Club Championship	Total
1	(Australia) Amy Jackson	2010–2014, 2019-	87	12	3	1	103
2	(Australia) Lia Privitelli	2016–	75	7	2	0	84
3	(Australia) Casey Dumont	2017–	64	7	2	0	73
4	(Australia) Melina Ayres	2017–	57	9	2	0	68
5	(Turkey) Gulcan Koca	2009–2018	61	5	0	1	67

==== Leading scorers ====
Natasha Dowie holds the record for most league goals with 33 (including finals) as of April 2023.

Last updated 30 April 2023

Competitive, professional matches only, appearances including substitutes appear in brackets.

	Name	Years	League	Finals	Total	Games per goal
1	(England) Natasha Dowie	2015–2020	33 (55)	0 (2)	33 (57)	1.73
2	(Australia) Melina Ayres	2017–	20 (57)	8 (9)	28 (66)	2.36
=3	(Australia) Caitlin Friend	2010–2014	15 (42)	0 (4)	15 (46)	3.07
=3	(Australia) Amy Jackson	2010–2014, 2019-	14 (87)	1 (12)	15 (99)	6.60
=5	(Australia) Lisa De Vanna	2013–2015, 2020-2021	11 (32)	3 (5)	14 (37)	2.64
=5	(United States) Catherine Zimmerman	2021–2023	12 (32)	2 (7)	14 (39)	2.79

== See also ==
- List of top-division football clubs in AFC countries
- Women's soccer in Australia
- W-League (Australia) all-time records
- Australia women's national soccer team
