= 2013–14 Melbourne Victory FC (women) season =

Melbourne Victory (women)
2013–14 season
- Chairman: Anthony Di Pietro
- Head Coach: Dave Edmondson
- Stadium: Lakeside Stadium; Kingston Heath Soccer Complex
- W-League: 3rd
- W-League Finals: Winners
- Top goalscorer: League: Caitlin Friend; Lisa De Vanna (7 each); All: Lisa De Vanna (8)
Home colours	Away colours

The 2013–14 season was Melbourne Victory (women)'s sixth season in the W-League.

== Players ==
Note: Flags indicate national team as defined under FIFA eligibility rules; some limited exceptions apply. Players may hold more than one non-FIFA nationality.

No.	Pos.	Nation	Player
1	GK	AUS	Brianna Davey
3	DF	AUS	Jessica Humble
4	MF	NZL	Katie Hoyle
5	FW	AUS	Laura Spiranovic
6	MF	AUS	Cindy Lay
7	DF	AUS	Steph Catley (captain)
8	FW	AUS	Ashley Brown
9	FW	AUS	Caitlin Friend
10	MF	WAL	Jess Fishlock
11	FW	AUS	Lisa De Vanna
12	DF	SWE	Jessica Samuelsson
13	FW	AUS	Tiffany Eliadis

No.	Pos.	Nation	Player
14	MF	AUS	Enza Barilla
15	DF	AUS	Emma Checker
16	MF	AUS	Beattie Goad
17	MF	TUR	Gülcan Koca
18	MF	AUS	Emily Hulbert
19	DF	AUS	Alex Natoli
20	GK	AUS	Cassandra Dimovski
21	MF	AUS	Ella Mastrantonio
22	DF	USA	Lauren Barnes (Guest player)
25	DF	AUS	Maika Ruyter-Hooley
30	GK	AUS	Melissa Maizels

== Transfers ==
=== Transfers in ===
Note: Flags indicate national team as defined under FIFA eligibility rules; some limited exceptions apply. Players may hold more than one non-FIFA nationality.

No.	Pos.	Nation	Player
11	FW	AUS	Lisa De Vanna (from (Australia) Perth Glory)
15	DF	AUS	Emma Checker (from (Australia) Adelaide United)
12	DF	SWE	Jessica Samuelsson (from (Sweden) Linköpings FC)
4	MF	NZL	Katie Hoyle (from (New Zealand) Eastern Suburbs AFC)
16	MF	AUS	Beattie Goad (from (Australia) EAP)
18	MF	AUS	Emily Hulbert (from (Australia) Box Hill United)
19	DF	AUS	Alex Natoli (from (Australia) Adelaide United)
22	DF	USA	Lauren Barnes (Guest player from (United States) Seattle Reign FC)
21	MF	AUS	Ella Mastrantonio (from (Australia) Perth Glory)

=== Transfers out ===
Note: Flags indicate national team as defined under FIFA eligibility rules; some limited exceptions apply. Players may hold more than one non-FIFA nationality.

No.	Pos.	Nation	Player
2	DF	USA	Danielle Johnson (To (Canada) Vancouver Whitecaps)
6	MF	SWE	Petra Larsson (Returned to (Sweden) Linköpings FC)
10	FW	USA	Jessica McDonald (To (United States) Chicago Red Stars)
12	DF	AUS	Jackie Vogt
13	MF	AUS	Louisa Bisby
15	MF	AUS	Amy Jackson
16	MF	AUS	Georgie Koutrouvelis (to (Australia) Box Hill United)
19	FW	AUS	Rachel Alonso (to (Australia) Bundoora United)

== Competitions ==
=== Overall record ===
Competition	First match	Last match	Starting round	Final position	Record							
Competition	First match	Last match	Starting round	Final position	Pld	W	D	L	GF	GA	GD	Win %
W-League	10 November 2013	9 February 2014	Matchday 1	3rd	12	7	2	3	23	12	+11	58.33
W-League Finals	16 February 2024	23 February 2014	Semi-finals	Winners	2	2	0	0	5	2	+3	100.00
Total					14	9	2	3	28	14	+14	64.29

Source: Competitions

=== W-League ===
==== League table ====
Pos	Team	Pld	W	D	L	GF	GA	GD	Pts	Qualification
1	Canberra United	12	9	0	3	28	8	+20	27	Qualification to Finals series
2	Sydney FC	12	8	2	2	37	14	+23	26	Qualification to Finals series
3	Melbourne Victory (C)	12	7	2	3	23	12	+11	23	Qualification to Finals series
4	Brisbane Roar	12	7	2	3	22	16	+6	23	Qualification to Finals series
5	Perth Glory	12	5	0	7	17	31	−14	15	
6	Adelaide United	12	3	4	5	12	15	−3	13	
7	Western Sydney Wanderers	12	2	3	7	17	23	−6	9	
8	Newcastle Jets	12	0	1	11	10	47	−37	1	

Source: au.soccerway.com
Rules for classification: 1) points; 2) goal difference; 3) number of goals scored.
(C) Champions

==== Results summary ====
Overall								Home						Away					
Pld	W	D	L	GF	GA	GD	Pts	W	D	L	GF	GA	GD	W	D	L	GF	GA	GD
12	7	2	3	23	12	+11	23	4	0	2	12	7	+5	3	2	1	11	5	+6

Source: worldfootball.net

==== Results by round ====
Round	1	2	3	4	5	6	7	8	9	10	11	12
Ground	H	A	A	H	A	H	H	H	A	A	H	A
Result	L	W	W	W	D	W	W	W	D	W	L	L
Position	8	5	4	2	3	2	1	1	2	2	3	3
Points	0	3	6	9	10	13	16	19	20	23	23	23

Source: worldfootball.net
A = Away; H = Home; W = Win; D = Draw; L = Loss

==== Matches ====
Win Draw Loss

10 November 2013 1	Melbourne Victory	1–5	Sydney FC	Melbourne
15:00 AEDT	Checker 3'	Report	Khamis 18'; Bolger 21', 73'; Taylor 59'; Kete 89'	Stadium: Lakeside Stadium; Referee: Kirralee Andruschak

16 November 2013 2	Adelaide United	0–2	Melbourne Victory	Adelaide
14:00 ACDT		Report	De Vanna 40' (pen.); Friend 59'	Stadium: Burton Park; Referee: Kelly Jones

1 December 2013 3	Perth Glory	1–3	Melbourne Victory	Perth
12:00 AWST	Julien 84'	Report	Fishlock 24'; Friend 32'; De Vanna 82'	Stadium: nib Stadium; Referee: Casey Reibelt

7 December 2013 4	Melbourne Victory	6–0	Newcastle Jets	Melbourne
15:00 AEDT	Friend 31', 42', 68'; Koca 34'; Barilla 52', 70'	Report		Stadium: Kingston Heath Soccer Complex; Referee: Rachael Mitchenson

15 December 2013 5	Sydney FC	1–1	Melbourne Victory	Sydney
14:15 AEDT	Kete 33'	Report	Fishlock 81'	Stadium: Allianz Stadium; Referee: Casey Reibelt

21 December 2013 6	Melbourne Victory	1–0	Adelaide United	Melbourne
15:00 AEDT	De Vanna 83'	Report		Stadium: Kingston Heath Soccer Complex; Referee: Katie Patterson

4 January 2014 7	Melbourne Victory	2–0	Western Sydney Wanderers	Melbourne
16:30 AEDT	Friend 47'; Goad 77'	Report		Stadium: AAMI Park; Referee: Rebecca Durcau

12 January 2014 8	Melbourne Victory	2–1	Canberra United	Melbourne
15:00 AEDT	De Vanna 47'; Friend 83'	Report	Fletcher 66'	Stadium: Lakeside Stadium; Referee: Kirralee Andruschak

19 January 2014 9	Western Sydney Wanderers	1–1	Melbourne Victory	Sydney
16:00 AEDT	Seaman 85'	Report	O'Neill 34' (o.g.)	Stadium: Campbelltown Stadium; Referee: Kelly Jones

25 January 2014 10	Newcastle Jets	1–4	Melbourne Victory	Newcastle
11:00 AEDT	Dobson 74'	Report	De Vanna 12', 53', 56'; Catley 57'	Stadium: Adamstown Oval; Referee: Katie Patterson

1 February 2014 11	Melbourne Victory	0–1	Perth Glory	Melbourne
15:00 AEDT		Report	Gill 22'	Stadium: Kingston Heath Soccer Complex; Referee: Casey Reibelt

9 February 2014 12	Brisbane Roar	1–0	Melbourne Victory	Brisbane
14:00 AEST	Gorry 40'	Report		Stadium: Queensland Sport and Athletics Centre; Referee: Rebecca Durcau

==== Finals series ====
16 February 2014 Semi-finals	Sydney FC	2–3	Melbourne Victory	Sydney
15:00 AEDT	Kerr 45+1'; Khamis 52'	Report	Fishlock 22'; Humble 36'; Barnes 71' (pen.)	Stadium: WIN Jubilee Oval; Referee: Kate Jacewicz

23 February 2014 Grand final	Melbourne Victory	2–0	Brisbane Roar	Melbourne
15:00 AEDT	De Vanna 38'; Barnes 41'	Report		Stadium: Lakeside Stadium; Attendance: 2,504; Referee: Casey Reibelt

== Awards ==
- Female Footballer of the Year - Lisa De Vanna
- Female U20 Footballer of the Year - Stephanie Catley
- Player of the Week (Round 3) - Jessica Fishlock
- Player of the Week (Round 8) - Katie Hoyle
