= 2014 Melbourne Victory FC (women) season =

Melbourne Victory WFC
2014 season
- Chairman: Anthony Di Pietro
- Manager: Joe Montemurro
- Stadium: Lakeside Stadium
- W-League: 2nd
- W-League Finals series: Semi-finals
- International Women's Club Championship: First round
- Top goalscorer: Racheal Quigley (8)
Home colours	Away colours

The 2014 Melbourne Victory FC W-League season in soccer was the club's seventh participation in the W-League, since the league's formation in 2008.

== Players ==
=== Squad information ===
Note: Flags indicate national team as defined under FIFA eligibility rules; some limited exceptions apply. Players may hold more than one non-FIFA nationality.

No.	Pos.	Nation	Player
1	GK	AUS	Brianna Davey
2	DF	AUS	Hannah Brewer
3	MF	AUS	Jessica Au
4	DF	AUS	Alex Natoli
5	DF	USA	Lauren Barnes (on loan from Seattle Reign FC)
6	MF	AUS	Gema Simon
7	DF	AUS	Stephanie Catley (Captain)
8	MF	AUS	Amy Jackson
9	FW	AUS	Racheal Quigley
10	MF	USA	Christine Nairn (on loan from Washington Spirit)
11	FW	AUS	Lisa De Vanna

No.	Pos.	Nation	Player
12	MF	AUS	Ella Mastrantonio
13	DF	AUS	Alexandra Gummer
14	FW	AUS	Tiffany Eliadis
15	DF	AUS	Emma Checker
16	MF	AUS	Beattie Goad
17	MF	TUR	Gülcan Koca
18	DF	USA	Elli Reed (on loan from Seattle Reign FC)
19	DF	AUS	Maika Ruyter-Hooley
20	GK	AUS	Cassandra Dimovski
29	FW	AUS	Caitlin Friend
30	GK	AUS	Erin Herd (Injury replacement)

=== Transfers in ===
Note: Flags indicate national team as defined under FIFA eligibility rules; some limited exceptions apply. Players may hold more than one non-FIFA nationality.

No.	Pos.	Nation	Player
8	MF	AUS	Amy Jackson
9	FW	AUS	Racheal Quigley (from (Australia) Adelaide United)
6	MF	AUS	Gema Simon (from (Australia) Newcastle Jets)
2	DF	AUS	Hannah Brewer (from (Australia) Newcastle Jets)
18	DF	USA	Elli Reed (on loan from (United States) Seattle Reign FC)
5	DF	USA	Lauren Barnes (on loan from (United States) Seattle Reign FC)
10	MF	USA	Christine Nairn (on loan from (United States) Washington Spirit)
11	FW	AUS	Lisa De Vanna (from (United States) Washington Spirit)
13	DF	AUS	Alexandra Gummer (from (Australia) Adelaide United)
3	MF	AUS	Jessica Au (from (Australia) South Melbourne)
30	GK	AUS	Tori Snelleksz (injury replacement from (Australia) Bundoora United)
29	FW	AUS	Caitlin Friend (from (England) Notts County)
30	GK	AUS	Erin Herd (injury replacement)

=== Transfers out ===
Note: Flags indicate national team as defined under FIFA eligibility rules; some limited exceptions apply. Players may hold more than one non-FIFA nationality.

No.	Pos.	Nation	Player
3	DF	AUS	Jessica Humble
4	MF	NZL	Katie Hoyle (to (England) Notts County)
5	FW	AUS	Laura Spiranovic
6	MF	AUS	Cindy Lay
8	FW	AUS	Ashley Brown
9	FW	AUS	Caitlin Friend (to (England) Notts County)
11	FW	AUS	Lisa De Vanna (to (United States) Boston Breakers)
10	MF	WAL	Jess Fishlock (to (Germany) FFC Frankfurt)
12	DF	SWE	Jessica Samuelsson (to (Sweden) Linköpings FC)
14	MF	AUS	Enza Barilla
18	MF	AUS	Emily Hulbert
30	GK	AUS	Melissa Maizels (to (Australia) Canberra United)

== Competitions ==
=== Overall ===
Competition	Started round	Current position / round	Final position / round	First match	Last match
W-League	—	—	2nd	13 September 2014	29 October 2014
W-League Finals series	Semi-finals	—	Semi-finals	13 December 2014	13 December 2014
IWCC Cup	First round	—	First round	30 November 2014	30 November 2014

=== W-League ===
==== Fixtures ====
13 September 2014 1	Newcastle Jets	1–0	Melbourne Victory	Newcastle
15:00 AEST	Salem	Report		Stadium: Wanderers Oval; Referee: Lara Smith

21 September 2014 2	Melbourne Victory	5–3	Western Sydney Wanderers	Melbourne
15:00 AEST	Jackson 20'; Quigley 24', 46'; De Vanna 51'; Koca 74'	Report	Winters 12', 55'; Carney 90+3'	Stadium: Broadmeadows Valley Park; Referee: Casey Reibelt

28 September 2014 3	Canberra United	2–4	Melbourne Victory	Canberra
15:00 AEST	Lindsey 59'; Munoz 80'	Report	Barnes 38' (pen.); Catley 43'; De Vanna 49'; Simon 69'	Stadium: McKellar Park; Attendance: 1,018; Referee: Casey Reibelt

6 October 2014 4	Sydney FC	1–1	Melbourne Victory	Sydney
17:00 AEDT	Spencer 60'	Report	Simon 86'	Stadium: Lambert Park; Attendance: 733; Referee: Kate Jacewicz

12 October 2014 5	Melbourne Victory	4–0	Adelaide United	Melbourne
15:00 AEDT	Nairn 29'; Jackson 59', 87', 89'	Report		Stadium: Lakeside Stadium; Attendance: 900; Referee: Rachel Mitchenson

19 October 2014 6	Brisbane Roar	1–1	Melbourne Victory	Brisbane
14:00 AEST	Franco 82'	Report	Jackson 69'	Stadium: Goodwin Park; Referee: Kirralee Andruschak

25 October 2014 7	Melbourne Victory	0–1	Canberra United	Melbourne
16:30 AEDT		Report	Sykes 29'	Stadium: Etihad Stadium; Attendance: 14,068; Referee: Kelly Jones

2 November 2014 8	Melbourne Victory	1–3	Perth Glory	Melbourne
15:00 AEDT	Quigley 4'	Report	Kennedy 40'; D'Ovidio 81'; Foord 90'	Stadium: Lakeside Stadium; Referee: Rebecca Durcau

9 November 2014 9	Western Sydney Wanderers	0–3	Melbourne Victory	Sydney
15:00 AEDT		Report	Catley 4'; Quigley 38'; De Vanna 74'	Stadium: Marconi Stadium; Referee: Kirralee Andruschak

16 November 2014 10	Melbourne Victory	2–1	Brisbane Roar	Melbourne
15:00 AEDT	Quigley 44'; Nairn 80'	Report	Raso 2'	Stadium: Lakeside Stadium

22 November 2014 11	Melbourne Victory	4–0	Newcastle Jets	Melbourne
15:00 AEDT	Quigley 23', 46', 69'; Goad 31'	Report		Stadium: Kingston Heath Soccer Complex; Referee: Kelly Jones

29 October 2014 12	Adelaide United	2–1	Melbourne Victory	Adelaide
19:00 ACDT	Woods 80'; Powell 84'	Report	Barnes 3'	Stadium: Adelaide Shores Football Centre

==== League table ====
Pos	Team	Pld	W	D	L	GF	GA	GD	Pts	Qualification
1	Perth Glory	12	10	0	2	39	10	+29	30	Qualification to Finals series
2	Melbourne Victory	12	6	2	4	26	15	+11	20	Qualification to Finals series
3	Canberra United (C)	12	6	2	4	22	18	+4	20	Qualification to Finals series
4	Sydney FC	12	5	3	4	17	16	+1	18	Qualification to Finals series
5	Newcastle Jets	12	5	2	5	25	21	+4	17	
6	Brisbane Roar	12	4	2	6	18	19	−1	14	
7	Adelaide United	12	3	1	8	9	29	−20	10	
8	Western Sydney Wanderers	12	2	2	8	14	42	−28	8	

Source: au.soccerway.com
Rules for classification: 1) points; 2) goal difference; 3) number of goals scored.
(C) Champions

==== Results summary ====
Overall								Home						Away					
Pld	W	D	L	GF	GA	GD	Pts	W	D	L	GF	GA	GD	W	D	L	GF	GA	GD
12	6	2	4	26	15	+11	20	4	0	2	16	8	+8	2	2	2	10	7	+3

Last updated: 22 November 2014.
Source: Competitive Matches

==== Results by round ====
Round	1	2	3	4	5	6	7	8	9	10	11	12
Ground	A	H	A	A	H	A	H	H	A	H	H	A
Result	L	W	W	D	W	D	L	L	W	W	W	L
Position	6	4	3	4	3	3	5	5	3	2	2	2

Updated to match(es) played on 7 December 2014. Source: Competitive Matches
A = Away; H = Home; W = Win; D = Draw; L = Loss

==== Goal scorers ====
Total	Player		Goals per Round											
Total	Player		1	2	3	4	5	6	7	8	9	10	11	12
8	(Australia)	Racheal Quigley		2						1	1	1	3	
5	(Australia)	Amy Jackson		1			3	1						
3	(Australia)	Lisa De Vanna		1	1						1			
2	(Australia)	Gema Simon			1	1								
2	(United States)	Lauren Barnes			1									1
2	(Australia)	Stephanie Catley			1						1			
2	(United States)	Christine Nairn					1					1		
1	(Turkey)	Gülcan Koca		1										
1	(Australia)	Beattie Goad											1	
26	TOTAL		0	5	4	1	4	1	0	1	3	2	4	1

=== W-League Finals series ===
13 December 2014 Semi-final	Melbourne Victory	0–0 (a.e.t.) (4–5 p)	Canberra United	Geelong
15:00 AEDT		Report		Stadium: Simonds Stadium; Referee: Kate Jacewicz
	Penalties
	Barnes (penalty scored); Catley (penalty scored); Reed (penalty scored); Nairn (penalty scored); Koca (penalty missed)		(penalty scored) G. Gill; (penalty scored) Lindsey; (penalty scored) Ochs; (penalty scored) Munoz; (penalty scored) Fletcher

=== International Women's Club Championship ===
==== Matches ====
30 November 2014 First round	Okayama Yunogo Belle (Japan)	5–0	(Australia) Melbourne Victory	Mimasaka, Japan
14:10 JST	Nakano 1', 82'; Arimachi 6', 37'; Miyama 75'	Report		Stadium: Mimasaka Rugby Football Field; Attendance: 1,863

== Awards ==
- Player of the Week (Round 3) – Lisa De Vanna
- Player of the Week (Round 5) – Amy Jackson
- Player of the Week (Round 10) – Christine Nairn
- Player of the Week (Round 11) – Racheal Quigley
