= 2014 W-League grand final (February) =

- Event: 2013–14 W-League
Melbourne Victory	Brisbane Roar
2	0
- Date: 23 February 2014
- Venue: Lakeside Stadium, Melbourne, Victoria, Australia
- Referee: Casey Reibelt
- Attendance: 2,504

The 2014 W-League grand final took place at Lakeside Stadium in Melbourne, Australia on 23 February 2014. It was the final match in the W-League 2013–14 season, and was played between third-placed Melbourne Victory and fourth-placed Brisbane Roar. Melbourne Victory won the match 2–0 thanks to goals by Lisa De Vanna and guest player Lauren Barnes.

== Match details ==
23 February 2014
15:00 AEDT

Melbourne Victory	2–0	Brisbane Roar
De Vanna 38'; Barnes 41'	Report

Lakeside Stadium, Melbourne
Attendance: 2,504
Referee: Casey Reibelt

Melbourne Victory	Brisbane Roar

MELBOURNE VICTORY:
GK	1	(Australia) Brianna Davey
DF	3	(Australia) Jessica Humble
DF	7	(Australia) Stephanie Catley (c)
DF	12	(Sweden) Jessica Samuelsson
DF	15	(Australia) Emma Checker
DF	22	(United States) Lauren Barnes
MF	4	(New Zealand) Katie Hoyle		(substituted off) 78'
MF	10	(Wales) Jessica Fishlock
MF	16	(Australia) Beattie Goad		(substituted off) 90+2'
MF	17	(Turkey) Gülcan Koca		(substituted off) 69'
FW	11	(Australia) Lisa De Vanna	(yellow card) 90+1'
Substitutes:
MF	21	(Australia) Ella Mastrantonio	(yellow card) 72'	(substituted on) 69'
MF	18	(Australia) Emily Hulbert		(substituted on) 78'
MF	14	(Australia) Enza Barilla		(substituted on) 90+2'
GK	20	(Australia) Cassandra Dimovski
FW	9	(Australia) Caitlin Friend
Manager:
(England) David Edmondson

BRISBANE ROAR:
GK	1	(Germany) Nadine Angerer
DF	2	(Australia) Laura Alleway
DF	5	(Australia) Brooke Spence
DF	7	(Australia) Kim Carroll
MF	8	(Australia) Elise Kellond-Knight (c)	(yellow card) 37'
MF	10	(Australia) Katrina Gorry
MF	11	(Australia) Vedrana Popovic		(substituted off) 84'
MF	13	(Australia) Tameka Butt
MF	19	(Australia) Ayesha Norrie		(substituted off) 46'
FW	16	(Australia) Hayley Raso
FW	17	(Australia) Emily Gielnik		(substituted off) 59'
Substitutes:
FW	6	(Australia) Joanne Burgess		(substituted on) 46'
FW	9	(Australia) Larissa Crummer		(substituted on) 59'
MF	18	(Australia) Sunny Franco		(substituted on) 84'
GK	20	(Australia) Kate Stewart
DF	4	(Australia) Clare Polkinghorne
Manager:
(Australia) Belinda Wilson

Assistant referees:
Sarah Ho
Alison Flynn
Kate Jacewicz

== Match statistics ==
	Melbourne Victory	Brisbane Roar
Ball possession	55%	45%
Time in opp. half	59%	41%
Corners	4	0
Shots on goal	15	10
On target shots	7	2
Balls in penalty area	40	24
Fouls	8	11
Yellow cards	2	1
Red cards	0	0

== See also ==
- List of W-League champions
