= A-League Women records and statistics =

Women's top tier soccer league in Australia

This is a list of A-League Women records and statistics.

== Club honours ==
=== Champions ===
This is a list of the clubs that have won the finals series (play-offs), where the winning team is crowned as the A-League Women (previously W-League) champions.

| Season | Grand Final date | Winning team | Score | Losing team | Location | Grand Final attendance |
|---|---|---|---|---|---|---|
| 2008–09 | 17 January 2009 | Queensland Roar (1) | 2–0 | Canberra United | Ballymore Stadium, Brisbane | 4,554 |
| 2009 | 19 December 2009 | Sydney FC (1) | 3–2 | Brisbane Roar | Toyota Stadium, Sydney | 1,439 |
| 2010–11 | 12 February 2011 | Brisbane Roar (2) (Note: Includes statistics from the club under its former name, Queensland Roar.) | 2–1 | Sydney FC | Campbelltown Stadium, Campbelltown | 1,872 |
| 2011–12 | 28 January 2012 | Canberra United (1) | 3–2 | Brisbane Roar | McKellar Park, Canberra | 2,512 |
| 2012–13 | 27 January 2013 | Sydney FC (2) | 3–1 | Melbourne Victory | AAMI Park, Melbourne | 4,181 |
| 2013–14 | 23 February 2014 | Melbourne Victory (1) | 2–0 | Brisbane Roar | Lakeside Stadium, Melbourne | 2,504 |
| 2014 | 21 December 2014 | Canberra United (2) | 3–1 | Perth Glory | nib Stadium, Perth | 2,671 |
| 2015–16 | 31 January 2016 | Melbourne City (1) | 4–1 | Sydney FC | AAMI Park, Melbourne | 4,206 |
| 2016–17 | 12 February 2017 | Melbourne City (2) | 2–0 | Perth Glory | nib Stadium, Perth | 4,591 |
| 2017–18 | 18 February 2018 | Melbourne City (3) | 2–0 | Sydney FC | Allianz Stadium, Sydney | 6,025 |
| 2018–19 | 16 February 2019 | Sydney FC (3) | 4–2 | Perth Glory | Netstrata Jubilee Stadium, Sydney | 6,127 |
| 2019–20 | 21 March 2020 | Melbourne City (4) | 1-0 | Sydney FC | AAMI Park, Melbourne | 0 (Note: behind closed doors due to the COVID-19 pandemic in Australia.) |
| 2020–21 | 11 April 2021 | Melbourne Victory (2) | 1–0 (a.e.t.) | Sydney FC | Netstrata Jubilee Stadium, Sydney | 4,619 |
| 2021–22 | 27 March 2022 | Melbourne Victory (3) | 2–1 | Sydney FC | Netstrata Jubilee Stadium, Sydney | 5,027 |
| 2022–23 | 30 April 2023 | Sydney FC (4) | 4–0 | Western United | CommBank Stadium, Parramatta | 9,519 |
| 2023–24 | 4 May 2024 | Sydney FC (5) | 1–0 | Melbourne City | AAMI Park, Melbourne | 7,671 |
| 2024–25 | 18 May 2025 | Central Coast Mariners (1) | 1–1 (a.e.t.) (5–4p) | Melbourne Victory | AAMI Park, Melbourne | 6,568 |
| 2025–26 | 16 May 2026 | Melbourne City (5) | 3–1 | Wellington Phoenix | AAMI Park, Melbourne | 7,174 |

The numbers in brackets indicate the number of championships won by a team.

- Most consecutive Championship wins: 3, Melbourne City (2015–16 to 2017–18)

=== Premiers ===
This is a list of the teams that have won the premiership of the A-League Women (previously W-League).

| Season | Premiers | Runners-up |
|---|---|---|
| 2008–09 | Queensland Roar (1) | Newcastle Jets |
| 2009 | Sydney FC (1) | Central Coast Mariners |
| 2010–11 | Sydney FC (2) | Brisbane Roar |
| 2011–12 | Canberra United (1) | Brisbane Roar |
| 2012–13 | Brisbane Roar (2) | Perth Glory |
| 2013–14 | Canberra United (2) | Sydney FC |
| 2014 | Perth Glory (1) | Melbourne Victory |
| 2015–16 | Melbourne City (1) | Canberra United |
| 2016–17 | Canberra United (3) | Perth Glory |
| 2017–18 | Brisbane Roar (3) | Sydney FC |
| 2018–19 | Melbourne Victory (1) | Brisbane Roar |
| 2019–20 | Melbourne City (2) | Melbourne Victory |
| 2020–21 | Sydney FC (3) | Brisbane Roar |
| 2021–22 | Sydney FC (4) | Melbourne City |
| 2022–23 | Sydney FC (5) | Western United |
| 2023–24 | Melbourne City (3) | Sydney FC |
| 2024–25 | Melbourne City (4) | Melbourne Victory |
| 2025–26 | Melbourne City (5) | Wellington Phoenix |

The numbers in brackets indicate the number of premierships won by a team.

- Most consecutive Premiership wins: 3, Sydney FC (2020–21 to 2022–23); Melbourne City (2023–24 to 2025–26)

=== Summary ===
As of 16 May 2026

| Club | Grand Final | | | Regular season | | | 'Double' |
| Club | Champions | Runners-up | Years won | Premiers | Runners-up | Years won | 'Double' |
|---|---|---|---|---|---|---|---|
| Sydney FC | 5 | 6 | 2009, 2012–13, 2018–19, 2022–23, 2023–24 | 5 | 3 | 2009, 2010–11, 2020–21, 2021–22, 2022–23 | 2 (2009, 2022–23 ) |
| Melbourne City | 5 | 1 | 2015–16, 2016–17, 2017–18, 2019–20 | 5 | 1 | 2015–16, 2019–20, 2023–24, 2024–25 | 2 (2015–16, 2019–20) |
| Melbourne Victory | 3 | 2 | 2013–14, 2020–21, 2021–22 | 1 | 3 | 2018–19 | – |
| Brisbane Roar | 2 | 3 | 2008–09, 2010–11 | 3 | 4 | 2008–09, 2012–13, 2017–18 | 1 (2008–09) |
| Canberra United | 2 | 1 | 2011–12, 2014 | 3 | 1 | 2011–12, 2013–14, 2016–17 | 1 (2011–12) |
| Central Coast Mariners | 1 | – | 2024–25 | – | 1 | – | – |
| Perth Glory | – | 3 | – | 1 | 2 | 2014 | – |
| Western United | – | 1 | – | – | 1 | – | – |
| Newcastle Jets | – | – | – | – | 1 | – | – |

=== Finals series ===
- Most consecutive final series: 16, Sydney FC (2008–09 to 2023–24)
- Most consecutive years not making final series: 13, Adelaide United (2008–09 to 2020–21)
- Most consecutive grand finals: 7, Sydney FC (2017–18 to 2023–24)

== Individual honours ==
=== Julie Dolan Medal ===
The medal is awarded annually to the player voted to be the best player in the W-League, the top women's football (soccer) league in Australia. The award is named after former Matildas Captain and football administrator Julie Dolan. The format was changed for the 2015–16 season, with a panel featuring former players, media, referees and technical staff, who voted on each regular-season match. The following table contains only the winners of the medal during the W-League era. The award was also presented for the best player in the previous Women's National Soccer League prior to the W-League.

| Year | Winner | Club | Ref. |
|---|---|---|---|
| 2008–09 | Lana Harch | Brisbane Roar | |
| 2009 | Michelle Heyman | Central Coast Mariners | |
| 2010–11 | Kyah Simon | Sydney FC | |
| 2011–12 | Sally Shipard | Canberra United | |
| 2012–13 | Clare Polkinghorne | Brisbane Roar | |
| 2013–14 | Tameka Butt | Brisbane Roar | |
| 2014 | Emily van Egmond | Newcastle Jets | |
| 2015–16 | Ashleigh Sykes | Canberra United | |
| 2016–17 | Sam Kerr | Perth Glory | |
| 2017–18 | Sam Kerr; Clare Polkinghorne | Perth Glory; Brisbane Roar | |
| 2018–19 | Christine Nairn | Melbourne Victory | |
| 2019–20 | Kristen Hamilton | Western Sydney Wanderers | |
| 2020–21 | Michelle Heyman | Canberra United | |
| 2021–22 | Fiona Worts | Adelaide United | |
| 2022–23 | Alex Chidiac | Melbourne Victory | |
| 2023–24 | Sophie Harding | Western Sydney Wanderers | |
| 2024–25 | Alex Chidiac | Melbourne Victory | |

=== Young Footballer of the Year ===
| Year | Winner | Club | Ref. |
|---|---|---|---|
| 2009 | Elise Kellond-Knight; Ellyse Perry | Brisbane Roar; Canberra United | |
| 2010–11 | Kyah Simon | Sydney FC | |
| 2011–12 | Ashley Brown | Melbourne Victory | |
| 2012–13 | Steph Catley | Melbourne Victory | |
| 2013–14 | Steph Catley | Melbourne Victory | |
| 2014 | Amy Harrison | Sydney FC | |
| 2015–16 | Larissa Crummer | Melbourne City | |
| 2016–17 | Remy Siemsen | Sydney FC | |
| 2017–18 | Ellie Carpenter | Canberra United | |
| 2018–19 | Ellie Carpenter | Canberra United | |
| 2019–20 | Ellie Carpenter | Melbourne City | |
| 2020–21 | Kyra Cooney-Cross | Melbourne Victory | |
| 2021–22 | Holly McNamara | Melbourne City | |
| 2022–23 | Sarah Hunter | Sydney FC | |
| 2023–24 | Daniela Galic | Melbourne City | |
| 2024–25 | Indiana Dos Santos | Sydney FC | |

=== FMA Player of the Year ===
| Year | Winner | Club | Ref. |
|---|---|---|---|
| 2012–13 | Sam Kerr | Sydney FC | |
| 2013–14 | Jess Fishlock | Melbourne Victory | |

=== Player's Player of the Year ===
| Year | Winner | Club | Reference |
|---|---|---|---|
| 2009 | Samantha Kerr | Perth Glory | |
| 2010–11 | Kyah Simon | Sydney FC | |
| 2011–12 | Lydia Williams | Canberra United | |
| 2012–13 | Tameka Butt | Brisbane Roar | |
| 2013–14 | Jess Fishlock | Melbourne Victory | |
| 2014 | Samantha Kerr | Perth Glory | |
| 2015–16 | Kim Little | Melbourne City | |

=== Goalkeeper of the Year (Golden Glove) ===
| Year | Winner | Club | Ref. |
|---|---|---|---|
| 2008–09 | Melissa Barbieri | Melbourne Victory | |
| 2009 | Jillian Loyden | Central Coast Mariners | |
| 2010–11 | Lydia Williams | Canberra United | |
| 2011–12 | Lydia Williams | Canberra United | |
| 2012–13 | Mackenzie Arnold | Canberra United | |
| 2013–14 | Melissa Barbieri | Adelaide United | |
| 2014 | Mackenzie Arnold | Perth Glory | |
| 2015–16 | Kaitlyn Savage | Adelaide United | |
| 2016–17 | Lydia Williams | Melbourne City | |
| 2017–18 | Mackenzie Arnold | Brisbane Roar | |
| 2018–19 | Aubrey Bledsoe | Sydney FC | |
| 2019–20 | Lydia Williams | Melbourne City | |
| 2019–20 | Aubrey Bledsoe | Sydney FC | |
| 2020–21 | Teagan Micah | Melbourne City | |
| 2021–22 | Casey Dumont | Melbourne Victory | |
| 2022–23 | Hillary Beall | Western United | |
| 2023–24 | Morgan Aquino | Perth Glory | |
| 2024–25 | Sarah Langman | Central Coast Mariners | |

=== Golden Boot ===
| Year | Winner | Club | Goals | Ref. |
|---|---|---|---|---|
| 2008–09 | Leena Khamis | Sydney FC | 7 | |
| 2009 | Michelle Heyman | Central Coast Mariners | 11 | |
| 2010–11 | Kyah Simon | Sydney FC | 12 | |
| 2011–12 | Michelle Heyman | Canberra United | 15 | |
| 2012–13 | Kate Gill | Perth Glory | 11 | |
| 2013–14 | Jodie Taylor | Sydney FC | 10 | |
| 2014 | Kate Gill | Perth Glory | 12 | |
| 2015–16 | Larissa Crummer | Melbourne City | 11 | |
| 2016–17 | Ashleigh Sykes | Canberra United | 12 | |
| 2017–18 | Sam Kerr | Perth Glory | 13 | |
| 2018–19 | Sam Kerr | Perth Glory | 13 | |
| 2019–20 | Morgan Andrews; Natasha Dowie; Kristen Hamilton; Remy Siemsen | Perth Glory; Melbourne Victory; Western Sydney Wanderers; Sydney FC | 7 | |
| 2020–21 | Emily Gielnik | Brisbane Roar | 13 | |
| 2021–22 | Fiona Worts | Adelaide United | 13 | |
| 2022–23 | Hannah Keane | Western United | 13 | |
| 2023–24 | Michelle Heyman | Canberra United | 17 | |
| 2024–25 | Holly McNamara | Melbourne City | 15 | |
| 2025–26 | Holly McNamara | Melbourne City | 12 | |

=== Goal of the Year ===
| Year | Winner | Club | Ref. |
|---|---|---|---|
| 2008–09 | Marianna Tabain | Perth Glory | |
| 2009 | Sam Kerr | Perth Glory | |
| 2010–11 | Heather Garriock | Sydney FC | |
| 2011–12 | Racheal Quigley | Adelaide United | |
| 2012–13 | Emily van Egmond | Newcastle Jets | |
| 2013–14 | Sally Shipard | Canberra United | |
| 2014 | Ashleigh Sykes | Canberra United | |
| 2015–16 | Vanessa DiBernardo | Perth Glory | |
| 2016–17 | Sam Kerr | Perth Glory | |
| 2017–18 | Lisa De Vanna | Sydney FC | |
| 2018–19 | Cortnee Vine | Newcastle Jets | |
| 2019–20 | Amy Jackson | Melbourne Victory | |
| 2020–21 | Lisa De Vanna | Melbourne Victory | |
| 2021–22 | Rachel Lowe | Sydney FC | |
| 2022–23 | Madison Haley | Sydney FC | |
| 2023–24 | Cassidy Davis | Newcastle Jets | |
| 2024–25 | Alana Jančevski | Melbourne Victory | |

=== Coach of the Year ===
| Year | Winner | Club | Ref. |
|---|---|---|---|
| 2008–09 | Jeff Hopkins | Brisbane Roar | |
| 2009 | Ray Junna; Stephen Roche | Canberra United; Central Coast Mariners | |
| 2010–11 | Alen Stajcic | Sydney FC | |
| 2011–12 | Jitka Klimková | Canberra United | |
| 2012–13 | Mike Mulvey | Melbourne Victory | |
| 2013–14 | Alen Stajcic | Sydney FC | |
| 2014 | Peter McGuinness | Newcastle Jets | |
| 2015–16 | Craig Deans | Newcastle Jets | |
| 2016–17 | Bobby Despotovski | Perth Glory | |
| 2017–18 | Melissa Andreatta | Brisbane Roar | |
| 2018–19 | Jeff Hopkins | Melbourne Victory | |
| 2019–20 | Rado Vidošić | Melbourne City | |
| 2020–21 | Jeff Hopkins | Melbourne Victory | |
| 2021–22 | Adrian Stenta | Adelaide United | |
| 2022–23 | Mark Torcaso | Western United | |
| 2023–24 | Emily Husband | Central Coast Mariners | |
| 2024–25 | Adrian Stenta | Adelaide United | |

=== Referee of the Year ===
| Year | Winner | Ref. |
|---|---|---|
| 2008–09 | Jacqui Melksham | |
| 2009 | Kate Jacewicz | |
| 2010–11 | Kate Jacewicz | |
| 2011–12 | Kate Jacewicz | |
| 2012–13 | Kate Jacewicz | |
| 2013–14 | Casey Reibelt | |
| 2014 | Kate Jacewicz | |
| 2015–16 | Kate Jacewicz | |
| 2016–17 | Kate Jacewicz | |
| 2017–18 | Casey Reibelt | |
| 2018–19 | Kate Jacewicz | |
| 2019–20 | Rebecca Durcau | |
| 2020–21 | Rebecca Durcau | |
| 2021–22 | Lara Lee | |
| 2022–23 | Casey Reibelt | |
| 2023–24 | Casey Reibelt | |

=== Fair Play Award ===
| Year | Winner | Ref. |
|---|---|---|
| 2008–09 | Brisbane Roar | |
| 2009 | Canberra United; Sydney FC | |
| 2010–11 | Melbourne Victory | |
| 2011–12 | Melbourne Victory; Canberra United | |
| 2012–13 | Sydney FC | |
| 2013–14 | Brisbane Roar; Melbourne Victory; Newcastle Jets | |
| 2014 | Adelaide United | |
| 2015–16 | Melbourne City | |
| 2016–17 | Adelaide United | |
| 2017–18 | Melbourne Victory | |
| 2018–19 | Newcastle Jets | |
| 2019–20 | Melbourne Victory; Newcastle Jets; Perth Glory | |
| 2020–21 | Brisbane Roar | |
| 2021–22 | Brisbane Roar | |
| 2022–23 | Canberra United | |
| 2023–24 | Melbourne City | |
| 2024–25 | Melbourne City | |

== Season records ==
=== Points ===
- Most points in a season: 41, Melbourne City (2023–24)
- Fewest points in a season: 0, Adelaide United (2010–11)
- Biggest Premiership title winning margin: 11 points, Melbourne City (2019–20)
- Smallest Premiership title winning margin: 0 points and +8 goal difference, Canberra United (2016–17)

=== Wins ===
- Most wins in a season: 13, Sydney FC (2022–23), Western United (2022–23)
- Fewest wins in a season: 0, Adelaide United (2009, 2010–11), Newcastle Jets (2009, 2013–14), Perth Glory (2020–21)

=== Losses ===
- Most losses in a season: 15, Adelaide United (2023–24)
- Fewest losses in a season: 0, Canberra United (2011–12), Melbourne City (2015–16, 2019–20)

=== Draws ===
- Most draws in a season: 8, Melbourne Victory (2022–23)
- Fewest draws in a season: 0 (in 18 games), Western United (2022–23)

=== Goals ===
- Most goals scored in a season: 44, Melbourne Victory (2023–24)
- Fewest goals scored in a season: 4, Adelaide United (2010–11)
- Most goals conceded in a season: 56, Adelaide United (2023–24)
- Fewest goals conceded in a season: 4, Melbourne City (2015–16, 2019–20)
- Best goal difference in a season: +34, Melbourne City (2015–16)
- Worst goal difference in a season: –37, Newcastle Jets (2013–14)

== Club records ==
=== Biggest victories ===
| Goal Diff. | Home team | Score | Away team | Date | Round, Season |
|---|---|---|---|---|---|
| 11 | Sydney FC | 11–0 | Perth Glory | 3 December 2011 | Round 7, 2011–12 W-League |
| 9 | Western Sydney Wanderers | 1–10 | Perth Glory | 5 October 2014 | Round 4, 2014 W-League |
| 8 | Adelaide United | 10–2 | Western Sydney Wanderers | 14 January 2017 | Round 12, 2016–17 W-League |
| 8 | Adelaide United | 0–8 | Newcastle Jets | 29 March 2024 | Round 22, 2023–24 A-League Women |
| 7 | Newcastle Jets | 0–7 | Melbourne Victory | 23 February 2020 | Round 13, 2019–20 W-League |
| 7 | Wellington Phoenix | 7–0 | Sydney FC | 20 December 2025 | Round 8, 2025-26 A-League Women |
| 6 | Adelaide United | 0–6 | Central Coast Mariners | 6 December 2008 | Round 7, 2008–09 W-League |
| 6 | Brisbane Roar | 6–0 | Perth Glory | 31 October 2009 | Round 5, 2009 W-League |
| 6 | Sydney FC | 6–0 | Adelaide United | 1 November 2009 | Round 5, 2009 W-League |
| 6 | Adelaide United | 0–6 | Central Coast Mariners | 14 November 2009 | Round 7, 2009 W-League |
| 6 | Newcastle Jets | 0–6 | Brisbane Roar | 5 December 2009 | Round 10, 2009 W-League |
| 6 | Newcastle Jets | 7–1 | Adelaide United | 8 January 2011 | Round 9, 2010–11 W-League |
| 6 | Melbourne Victory | 6–0 | Newcastle Jets | 7 December 2013 | Round 4, 2013–14 W-League |
| 6 | Sydney FC | 8–2 | Perth Glory | 5 January 2014 | Round 7, 2013–14 W-League |
| 6 | Sydney FC | 0–6 | Melbourne City | 18 October 2015 | Round 1, 2015–16 W-League |
| 6 | Melbourne City | 0–6 | Melbourne Victory | 10 January 2021 | Round 3, 2020–21 W-League |
| 6 | Brisbane Roar | 6–0 | Melbourne Victory | 22 January 2021 | Round 5, 2020–21 W-League |
| 6 | Melbourne Victory | 6–0 | Perth Glory | 28 March 2021 | Round 14, 2020–21 W-League |
| 6 | Sydney FC | 6–0 | Canberra United | 15 January 2022 | Round 7, 2021–22 A-League Women |
| 6 | Brisbane Roar | 2–8 | Adelaide United | 13 February 2022 | Round 11, 2021–22 A-League Women |
| 6 | Newcastle Jets | 0–6 | Western United | 26 February 2023 | Round 15, 2022–23 A-League Women |
| 6 | Western United | 2–8 | Brisbane Roar | 29 December 2024 | Round 8, 2024–25 A-League Women |

=== Highest aggregate scores ===
| Goals | Home team | Score | Away team | Date | Round, Season |
|---|---|---|---|---|---|
| 12 | Sydney FC | 5–7 | Perth Glory | 15 December 2012 | Round 9, 2012–13 W-League |
| 12 | Adelaide United | 10–2 | Western Sydney Wanderers | 14 January 2017 | Round 12, 2016–17 W-League |
| 11 | Sydney FC | 11–0 | Perth Glory | 3 December 2011 | Round 7, 2011–12 W-League |
| 11 | Western Sydney Wanderers | 1–10 | Perth Glory | 5 October 2014 | Round 4, 2014 W-League |
| 10 | Sydney FC | 8–2 | Perth Glory | 5 January 2014 | Round 7, 2013–14 W-League |
| 10 | Brisbane Roar | 2–8 | Adelaide United | 13 February 2022 | Round 11, 2021–22 A-League Women |
| 10 | Western United | 2–8 | Brisbane Roar | 29 December 2024 | Round 8, 2024–25 A-League Women |
| 9 | Canberra United | 7–2 | Perth Glory | 14 January 2017 | Round 12, 2016–17 W-League |
| 9 | Melbourne Victory | 3–6 | Sydney FC | 26 January 2023 | Round 12, 2022–23 A-League Women |
| 8 | Perth Glory | 3–5 | Queensland Roar | 7 December 2008 | Round 7, 2008–09 W-League |
| 8 | Adelaide United | 2–6 | Sydney FC | 28 November 2009 | Round 9, 2009 W-League |
| 8 | Newcastle Jets | 7–1 | Adelaide United | 8 January 2011 | Round 9, 2010–11 W-League |
| 8 | Brisbane Roar | 6–2 | Adelaide United | 22 December 2012 | Round 10, 2012–13 W-League |
| 8 | Newcastle Jets | 2–6 | Brisbane Roar | 4 January 2014 | Round 7, 2013–14 W-League |
| 8 | Melbourne Victory | 5–3 | Western Sydney Wanderers | 21 September 2014 | Round 2, 2014 W-League |
| 8 | Perth Glory | 4–4 | Canberra United | 20 January 2018 | Round 12, 2017–18 W-League |
| 8 | Canberra United | 4–4 | Perth Glory | 4 November 2018 | Round 2, 2018–19 W-League |
| 8 | Perth Glory | 2–6 | Sydney FC | 25 February 2021 | Round 10, 2020–21 W-League |
| 8 | Brisbane Roar | 2–6 | Melbourne Victory | 4 April 2021 | Semi-final, 2020–21 W-League |
| 8 | Adelaide United | 4–4 | Canberra United | 15 October 2023 | Round 1, 2023–24 A-League Women |
| 8 | Melbourne City | 5–3 | Brisbane Roar | 28 December 2023 | Round 10, 2023–24 A-League Women |
| 8 | Melbourne Victory | 5–3 | Wellington Phoenix | 3 March 2024 | Round 18, 2023–24 A-League Women |
| 8 | Adelaide United | 0–8 | Newcastle Jets | 29 March 2024 | Round 22, 2023–24 A-League Women |

=== League streaks ===
As of 18 April 2025

Longest Undefeated Streak
| Rank | Team | No. | From | To |
|---|---|---|---|---|
| 1 | Melbourne City | 27 | 10 March 2024 | present |
| 2 | Brisbane Roar | 18 | 8 November 2008 | 28 November 2009 |
| 2 | Melbourne City | 18 | 18 October 2015 | 4 December 2016 |
| 4 | Melbourne City | 17 | 20 January 2019 | 29 December 2020 |
| 5 | Canberra United | 16 | 22 October 2011 | 17 November 2012 |
| 6 | Sydney FC | 14 | 10 October 2009 | 27 November 2010 |
| 7 | Sydney FC | 13 | 26 March 2021 | 13 February 2022 |
| 8 | Brisbane Roar | 12 | 13 November 2010 | 5 November 2011 |
| 8 | Sydney FC | 12 | 12 January 2013 | 29 January 2014 |
| 10 | Sydney FC | 10 | 18 November 2017 | 10 February 2018 |

Longest Winless Streak
| Rank | Team | No. | From | To |
|---|---|---|---|---|
| 1 | Adelaide United | 34 | 15 November 2008 | 17 December 2011 |
| 2 | Newcastle Jets | 19 | 24 November 2012 | 13 September 2014 |
| 3 | Perth Glory | 13 | 29 February 2020 | 28 March 2021 |
| 4 | Newcastle Jets | 12 | 28 December 2008 | 6 November 2010 |
| 4 | Adelaide United | 12 | 3 January 2016 | 14 January 2017 |
| 4 | Perth Glory | 12 | 7 January 2024 | 31 March 2024 |
| 7 | Western Sydney Wanderers | 11 | 4 January 2014 | 12 October 2014 |
| 7 | Newcastle Jets | 11 | 16 January 2022 | 19 November 2022 |
| 9 | Adelaide United | 10 | 11 January 2014 | 19 October 2014 |
| 9 | Western Sydney Wanderers | 10 | 4 February 2018 | 10 January 2019 |
| 9 | Wellington Phoenix | 10 | 3 December 2021 | 4 February 2022 |

== Player records ==
=== Appearances ===
- Youngest player: Willa Pearson, 14 years, 312 days (for Sydney FC v Melbourne City, 1 November 2025)
- Oldest player: Melissa Barbieri, 46 years, 75 days (for Melbourne City v Newcastle Jets, 5 April 2026)

=== Most appearances ===
As of 16 October 2026.

Players listed in bold are still actively playing in the A-League Women.

| Rank | Player | Appearances |
|---|---|---|
| 1 | (Australia) **Michelle Heyman** | 221 |
| 2 | (Australia) **Tameka Yallop** | 189 |
| 3 | (Australia) **Cassidy Davis** | 185 |
| 4 | (Australia) **Rebekah Stott** | 166 |
| 5 | (Australia) Casey Dumont | 165 |
| 6 | (Australia) **Princess Ibini** | 160 |
| 7 | (Australia) Kim Carroll | 159 |
| 8 | (Australia) Teresa Polias | 157 |
| 9 | (Australia) Clare Polkinghorne | 152 |
| 10 | (Australia) Caitlin Cooper | 151 |
| 10 | (Australia) Amy Harrison | 151 |
| 10 | (Australia) Gema Simon | 151 |

=== Top scorers ===
As of 16 October 2026.

Players listed in bold are still actively playing in the A-League Women.

| Rank | Player | Goals |
|---|---|---|
| 1 | (Australia) **Michelle Heyman** | 125 |
| 2 | (Australia) **Tameka Yallop** | 77 |
| 3 | (Australia) Samantha Kerr | 70 |
| 4 | (Australia) Emily Gielnik | 67 |
| 5 | (Australia) Kyah Simon | 53 |
| 6 | (Australia) Leena Khamis | 46 |
| 7 | (Australia) Tara Andrews | 45 |
| 8 | (Australia) Melina Ayres | 44 |
| 8 | (Australia) Ashleigh Sykes | 44 |
| 10 | (Australia) Lisa De Vanna | 42 |
| 10 | (Australia) Kate Gill | 42 |
| 10 | (Australia) Holly McNamara | 42 |

=== Most clean sheets ===
As of 16 October 2026: Most clean sheets (CS).

Players listed in bold are still actively playing in the A-League Women.

| Rank | Player | CS |
|---|---|---|
| 1 | (Australia) Lydia Williams | 53 |
| 2 | (Australia) Casey Dumont | 49 |
| 3 | (Australia) **Jada Mathyssen-Whyman** | 37 |
| 4 | (Australia) Mackenzie Arnold | 27 |
| 5 | (Australia) **Melissa Barbieri** | 26 |
| 6 | (Australia) **Courtney Newbon** | 25 |
| 7 | (Australia) **Sarah Langman** | 22 |
| 8 | (Australia) Brianna Davey | 18 |
| 8 | (Australia) **Sham Khamis** | 18 |
| 10 | (Spain) **Malena Mieres** | 15 |

=== Most Goals in a Match ===
Player's team is listed in bold.

| Goals | Player | Match | Date |
|---|---|---|---|
| **5** | Kate Gill | Western Sydney Wanderers v **Perth Glory** | 5 October 2014 |
| **5** | Hannah Wilkinson | Melbourne Victory v **Melbourne City** | 26 December 2021 |
| **5** | (England) Fiona Worts | **Adelaide United** v Brisbane Roar | 15 January 2022 |
| **4** | Tara Andrews | **Newcastle Jets** v Adelaide United | 8 January 2011 |
| **4** | Ashleigh Sykes | **Canberra United** v Perth Glory | 14 January 2017 |

=== Hat-tricks ===
==== Most hat-tricks ====
| Rank | Player | Hat-tricks |
|---|---|---|
| 1 | (Australia) Michelle Heyman | 6 |
| 2 | (Australia) Emily Gielnik | 4 |
| 2 | (Australia) Sam Kerr | 4 |
| 2 | (Australia) Holly McNamara | 4 |
| 2 | (Australia) Tameka Yallop | 4 |
| 6 | (Australia) Melina Ayres | 2 |
| 6 | (Australia) Lisa De Vanna | 2 |
| 6 | (England) Natasha Dowie | 2 |
| 6 | (Australia) Caitlin Foord | 2 |
| 6 | (Australia) Laini Freier | 2 |
| 6 | (Australia) Caitlin Friend | 2 |
| 6 | (Australia) Kate Gill | 2 |
| 6 | (United States) Arin Gilliland | 2 |
| 6 | (Australia) Kyah Simon | 2 |
| 6 | (Australia) Rosie Sutton | 2 |
| 6 | (England) Fiona Worts | 2 |

==== Fastest hat-tricks ====
| Minutes | Player | Match | Date |
|---|---|---|---|
| 7 | (Australia) Sam Kerr | Newcastle Jets v **Perth Glory** | 16 December 2017 |
| 7 | (United States) Kennedy White | Western Sydney Wanderers v **Melbourne Victory** | 9 November 2025 |
| 11 | (New Zealand) Sarah McLaughlin | **Adelaide United** v Western Sydney Wanderers | 20 October 2012 |
| 11 | (Australia) Kate Gill | Western Sydney Wanderers v **Perth Glory** | 5 October 2014 |
| 15 | (Norway) Elise Thorsnes | **Canberra United** v Adelaide United | 7 January 2018 |
| 16 | (Australia) Michelle Heyman | **Canberra United** v Perth Glory | 29 October 2011 |
| 16 | (Australia) Leena Khamis | **Sydney FC** v Perth Glory | 3 December 2011 |
| 17 | (Australia) Sienna Saveska | **Western Sydney Wanderers** v Western United | 14 December 2024 |
| 18 | (Australia) Emily Gielnik | **Brisbane Roar** v Adelaide United | 12 March 2021 |
| 19 | (Australia) Melina Ayres | Melbourne City v **Melbourne Victory** | 15 April 2023 |
| 19 | (Australia) Daniela Galic | **Melbourne City** v Adelaide United | 28 December 2023 |

== All-time A-League Women ladders ==
=== Regular season matches ===
As of the end of the 2024–25 regular season, ranked by total points

| Position | Club | Seasons | Pld | W | D | L | GF | GA | GD | Pts | Prem | RUp | Avg |
|---|---|---|---|---|---|---|---|---|---|---|---|---|---|
| 1 | Sydney FC | 17 | 225 | 128 | 32 | 65 | 450 | 261 | 189 | 416 | 5 | 3 | 1.85 |
| 2 | Melbourne Victory | 17 | 225 | 105 | 48 | 72 | 383 | 296 | 87 | 363 | 1 | 3 | 1.61 |
| 3 | Brisbane Roar | 17 | 225 | 105 | 42 | 78 | 396 | 318 | 78 | 357 | 3 | 4 | 1.59 |
| 4 | Canberra United | 17 | 225 | 98 | 54 | 73 | 401 | 342 | 59 | 348 | 3 | 1 | 1.55 |
| 5 | Melbourne City | 10 | 149 | 93 | 22 | 34 | 296 | 160 | 136 | 301 | 4 | 1 | 2.02 |
| 6 | Perth Glory | 17 | 225 | 84 | 37 | 104 | 351 | 426 | −75 | 289 | 1 | 2 | 1.28 |
| 7 | Adelaide United | 17 | 225 | 66 | 33 | 126 | 292 | 475 | −183 | 231 | – | – | 1.03 |
| 8 | Newcastle Jets | 17 | 225 | 61 | 37 | 127 | 311 | 467 | −156 | 220 | – | 1 | 0.98 |
| 9 | Western Sydney Wanderers | 13 | 185 | 50 | 30 | 105 | 221 | 360 | −139 | 180 | – | – | 0.97 |
| 10 | Western United | 3 | 63 | 33 | 9 | 21 | 114 | 100 | 14 | 108 | – | 1 | 1.71 |
| 11 | Central Coast Mariners | 4 | 65 | 30 | 13 | 22 | 101 | 76 | 25 | 103 | – | 1 | 1.58 |
| 12 | Wellington Phoenix | 4 | 77 | 21 | 9 | 47 | 94 | 129 | −35 | 72 | – | – | 0.94 |

=== Finals matches ===
As of the end of the 2024–25 post-season

| Position | Club | Finals Series | Pld | W | D | L | GF | GA | GD | Pen. | Champ | RUp |
|---|---|---|---|---|---|---|---|---|---|---|---|---|
| 1 | Sydney FC | 16 | 29 | 16 | 3 | 10 | 51 | 40 | 11 | 0−2 | 5 | 6 |
| 2 | Melbourne City | 8 | 16 | 9 | 3 | 4 | 31 | 16 | 15 | 1−1 | 4 | 1 |
| 3 | Melbourne Victory | 12 | 20 | 9 | 5 | 6 | 34 | 29 | 5 | 2−3 | 3 | 2 |
| 4 | Brisbane Roar | 10 | 15 | 4 | 4 | 7 | 20 | 27 | −7 | 3−1 | 2 | 3 |
| 5 | Canberra United | 10 | 13 | 4 | 2 | 7 | 12 | 19 | −7 | 1−1 | 2 | 1 |
| 6 | Central Coast Mariners | 3 | 8 | 2 | 4 | 2 | 7 | 7 | 0 | 2−0 | 1 | − |
| 7 | Perth Glory | 4 | 7 | 3 | 1 | 3 | 16 | 13 | 3 | 0–1 | − | 3 |
| 8 | Western United | 3 | 4 | 1 | 0 | 3 | 3 | 9 | −6 | − | − | 1 |
| 9 | Newcastle Jets | 3 | 5 | 1 | 0 | 4 | 6 | 12 | −6 | − | − | − |
| 10 | Adelaide United | 2 | 4 | 1 | 0 | 3 | 4 | 8 | −4 | − | − | − |
| 11 | Western Sydney Wanderers | 1 | 1 | 0 | 0 | 1 | 1 | 5 | −4 | − | − | − |

== See also ==
- List of A-League Women hat-tricks
- A-League Men records and statistics
