= List of Sydney FC (women) head coaches =

Women's football club

Sydney FC (A-League Women) is an Australian women's association football club based in Moore Park, Sydney. The club was formed in 2008. They were an inaugural member of the W-League in 2008.

There have been three permanent and one stand-in manager of Sydney FC since 2008. The most successful person to manage Sydney FC is Ante Juric, who has won three premierships, two championships and has appeared in six grand finals. He is also the club's longest-serving manager.

This chronological list comprises all those who have held the position of manager of the first team of Sydney FC since their foundation in 2008. Each manager's entry includes his dates of tenure and the club's overall competitive record (in terms of matches won, drawn and lost), honours won and significant achievements while under his care. Caretaker and acting managers are included, where known, as well as those who have been in permanent charge.

== Managerial history ==
On 9 September 2008, Sydney FC announced their inaugural head coach as Alen Stajcic. In his first season in charge, he guided the team to the semi-finals before leading them to the double the following season. Sydney FC then took out back-to-back premierships in 2010–11 but were not able to clinch the championship that season. Again, Sydney FC made finals the following season but bowed out in the semi-finals. In Stajcic's final full season in charge, he would steer the team to a second championship in the 2013 W-League Grand Final. During the off-season Stajcic would take up an interim position as the Matildas head coach. This move would be announced as permanent at the beginning of the 2014 season. Sydney would announce his successor, Dan Barrett as the new head coach which would come into effect in round 5 of the season.

Under Barrett, Sydney FC made the finals in all three seasons of his tenure, but were unable to obtain any silverware. They made the grand final on one occasion, in the 2015–16 W-League however, they lost 4–1 to Melbourne City. In his final season in charge, Sydney bowed out in the semi-finals. It was announced on 15 May 2017, that Barrett was resigning from his position as head coach.

On 7 June 2017, it was announced that Ante Juric would be taking over as head coach for the team. In his first season in charge, Sydney finished second after the regular season and were able to secure a home grand final. Unfortunately, they would lose to reigning champions Melbourne City 0–2 in the 2018 W-League Grand Final. The following season, Juric would build on that performance to help guide the team to another championship in the 2019 W-League Grand Final, defeating Perth Glory 4–2, in front of 6,127, which at the time was a record for W-League grand finals. Over the next three seasons, Juric would then guide the team to three consecutive grand finals, unfortunately losing all three. However, over the period from 2020 to 2023, Sydney would achieve an A-League Women record of three consecutive premierships. The final one in the 2022–23 A-League Women campaign would yield the double, when the team went on to win the championship at Western Sydney Stadium against first-year expansion team Western United to a commanding 4–0 scoreline in front of another A-League Women grand finals record crowd.

== Managers ==
- Manager dates are sourced from independent articles listed in notes. Statistics and nationalities are sourced from SFCStatistics.com for Stajcic to Whiteside. Names of caretaker managers are supplied where known, and periods of caretaker management are highlighted in italics and marked caretaker or caretaker, then permanent appointment, depending on the scenario. Win percentage is rounded to two decimal places.
- Only first-team competitive matches are counted. Wins, losses and draws are results at the final whistle; the results of penalty shoot-outs are not counted.
- Statistics are complete up to and including the match played on 30 April 2023.

Key

- M = matches played; W = matches won; D = matches drawn; L = matches lost; GF = Goals for; GA = Goals against; Win % = percentage of total matches won
- † Managers with this background and symbol in the "Name" column are italicised to denote caretaker or acting manager appointments.
- ‡ Managers with this background and symbol in the "Name" column are italicised to denote caretaker appointments promoted to full-time manager.

List of Sydney FC managers
Name	Nationality	From	To	M	W	D	L	GF	GA	Win %	Honours	Notes
Alen Stajcic	Australia	8 September 2008	6 October 2014	80	47	14	19	197	100	58.75	W-League premiers: 2009, 2010–11; W-League champions: 2009, 2013	
Dan Barrett	Australia	7 October 2014	15 May 2017	36	16	4	16	50	63	44.44		
Ante Juric	Australia	7 June 2017	Present	92	61	7	24	202	94	66.30	A-League Women premiers: 2020–21, 2021–22, 2022–23; A-League Women champions: 2019, 2023	
Tom Whiteside †	Australia	13 February 2022	13 February 2022	1	1	0	0	1	0	100.00		
