= Lydia Williams =

Australian soccer player (born 1988)

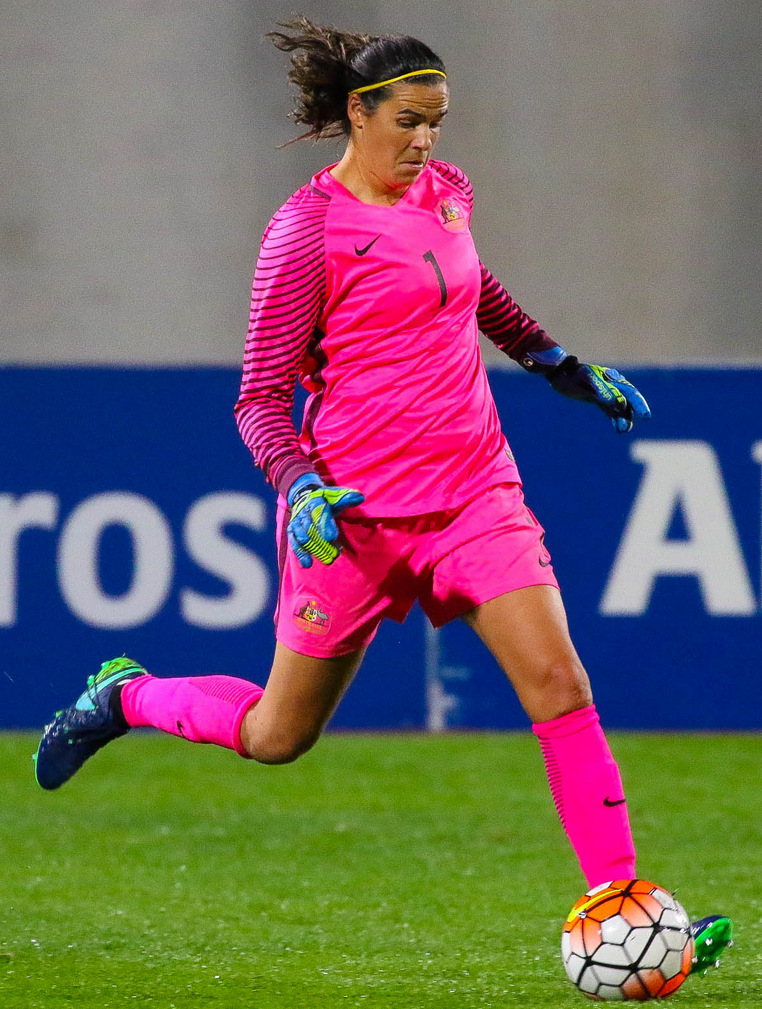
- Williams playing for Australia at the 2017 Algarve Cup

Personal information
- Full name: Lydia Grace Yilkari Williams
- Date of birth: 13 May 1988 (age 38)
- Place of birth: Katanning, Australia
- Height: 1.75 m (5 ft 9 in)
- Position: Goalkeeper

Youth career
- Tuggeranong United
- Woden Valley
- 2004–2008: AIS

Senior career*
Years	Team	Apps	(Gls)
2008–2012	Canberra United	46	(0)
2009	Chicago Red Stars	0	(0)
2012–2013	Piteå IF	24	(0)
2013–2014	Canberra United	12	(0)
2014	Western New York Flash	14	(0)
2015–2016	Canberra United	10	(0)
2016–2017	Houston Dash	15	(0)
2016–2017	→ Melbourne City (loan)	14	(0)
2017–2019	Reign FC	21	(0)
2017–2018	→ Melbourne City (loan)	12	(0)
2018–2019	→ Melbourne City (loan)	12	(0)
2019–2020	Melbourne City	14	(0)
2020–2022	Arsenal	11	(0)
2022–2023	Paris Saint-Germain	1	(0)
2023	Brighton & Hove Albion	7	(0)
2023–2025	Melbourne Victory	11	(0)

International career^{‡}
2006–2007	Australia U20	14	(0)
2005–2024	Australia	104	(0)
- * Club domestic league appearances and goals as of 17 December 2024 ‡ National team caps and goals as of 17 December 2024

Lydia Grace Yilkari Williams (Aboriginal pronunciation: [jɪlkɑɹiː]; born 13 May 1988) is an Australian former professional soccer player who played as a goalkeeper and represented the Australian national team.

Williams played for Melbourne City, Canberra United, and Melbourne Victory in Australia's A-League Women; Reign FC, Houston Dash and the Western New York Flash in the National Women's Soccer League (NWSL) in the United States; Piteå IF in Sweden's Damallsvenskan; Arsenal and Brighton & Hove Albion in England's Women's Super League (WSL); and Paris Saint-Germain in France's Première Ligue.

Williams was twice-named PFA Women's Footballer of the Year for 2011–12 and 2015–16 and to the PFA W-League Team of the Season for 2016–17. She was awarded W-League Goalkeeper of the Year for the 2010–11, 2011–12, and 2016–17 seasons. Inducted to the Aboriginal and Islander Sports Hall of Fame, she earned for her first cap for the Australian national team, commonly known as the Matildas, at age 16. She is the author of the children's book, Saved!!!, published in 2019. In 2025, she was awarded the National Sports Trailblazer Award at the National Aboriginal and Torres Strait Islander Sports Awards.

== Early life and education ==
Lydia Grace Yilkari Williams was born on 13 May 1988 in Katanning, Western Australia. Williams was raised by her Noongar Aboriginal father and American mother in the regional mining town of Kalgoorlie. She spent most of her primary school years in Kalgoorlie, where she attended St Joseph's School. Williams' family left Kalgoorlie for Canberra when she was eleven years old.

In November 2019, Williams authored a children's book called, Saved!!!, which drew on her life experiences, from growing up in the desert to achieving success as an Aboriginal female football player.

== Club career ==
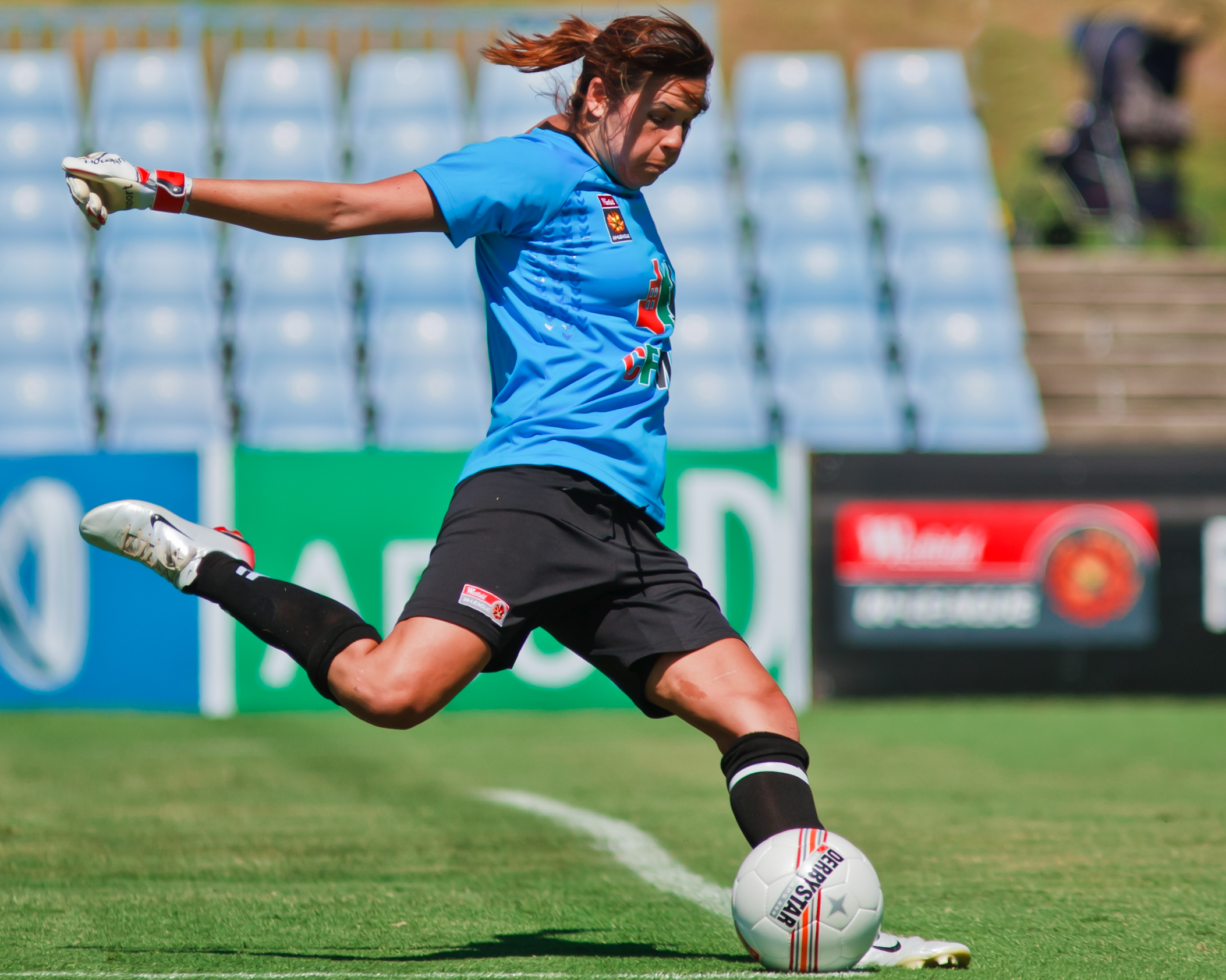
Williams playing for Canberra United in 2009

After playing junior football for Tuggeranong and Woden in the Australian Capital Territory, Williams joined the Australian Institute of Sport Football Program.

Her longtime coach and mentor has been Paul Jones, who later started coaching Jada Mathyssen-Whyman.

Williams joined Australian W-League team Canberra United in 2008 and made 11 appearances for the club as their starting goalkeeper during the 2009 W-League season. Canberra finished in fourth place during the regular season with a 4–4–2 record, earning a berth to the Playoffs. Canberra was defeated 3–0 by eventual Grand Final winners, Sydney FC.

During the 2010–11 W-League, Williams was the starting goalkeeper in all eleven matches. Canberra finished in third place with a 5–3–2 record. After advancing to the Playoffs, they faced Brisbane Roar in the semi-finals and tied 2–2 leading to a penalty kick shootout in which Canberra lost 2–4.

=== Western New York Flash, Canberra United, and Houston Dash: 2014–17 ===
In 2014, the Western New York Flash signed Williams to be their starting goalkeeper following a season-ending injury to Adrianna Franch. Williams started 14 games in goal for the Flash. She recorded two clean sheets in 2014 prior to suffering a season-ending ACL injury while competing at the 2014 AFC Women's Asian Cup with the Australian national team. In September 2014, Williams was waived by the Flash and was selected by Washington Spirit for the 2015 season, though she did not play for the team.

After returning to Australia, Williams played for Canberra United for the 2015–16 W-League season. She was the starting goalkeeper in the 10 games in which she played and helped Canberra finish second in the regular season with a 8–2–2 record, earning a berth to the Playoffs. Canberra was defeated 1–0 by Sydney FC's controversial goal in the semi-finals.

In January 2016, Williams signed with the Houston Dash. She was the starting goalkeeper in all 15 games that she played. Two of her saves were voted Save of the Week by fans in Week 5 and 19. The Dash finished in eighth place during the regular season with a 6–10–4 record.

=== Melbourne City (loan): 2016–17 ===
Following the season, Williams signed on loan with Melbourne City for the 2016–17 W-League. Williams was the starting goalkeeper in 15 games helping Melbourne City finish in fourth place during the regular season with a 6–4–2 record, securing a berth to the Finals. Williams was described as "impenetrable" after holding Canberra United to a 1–0 clean sheet in extra time during the semi-final. She continued her effective, defensive armour in the 2–0 win over Perth Glory in the Grand Final. Williams was named the league's Goalkeeper of the Year following the season.

=== Reign FC and Melbourne City: 2017–20 ===
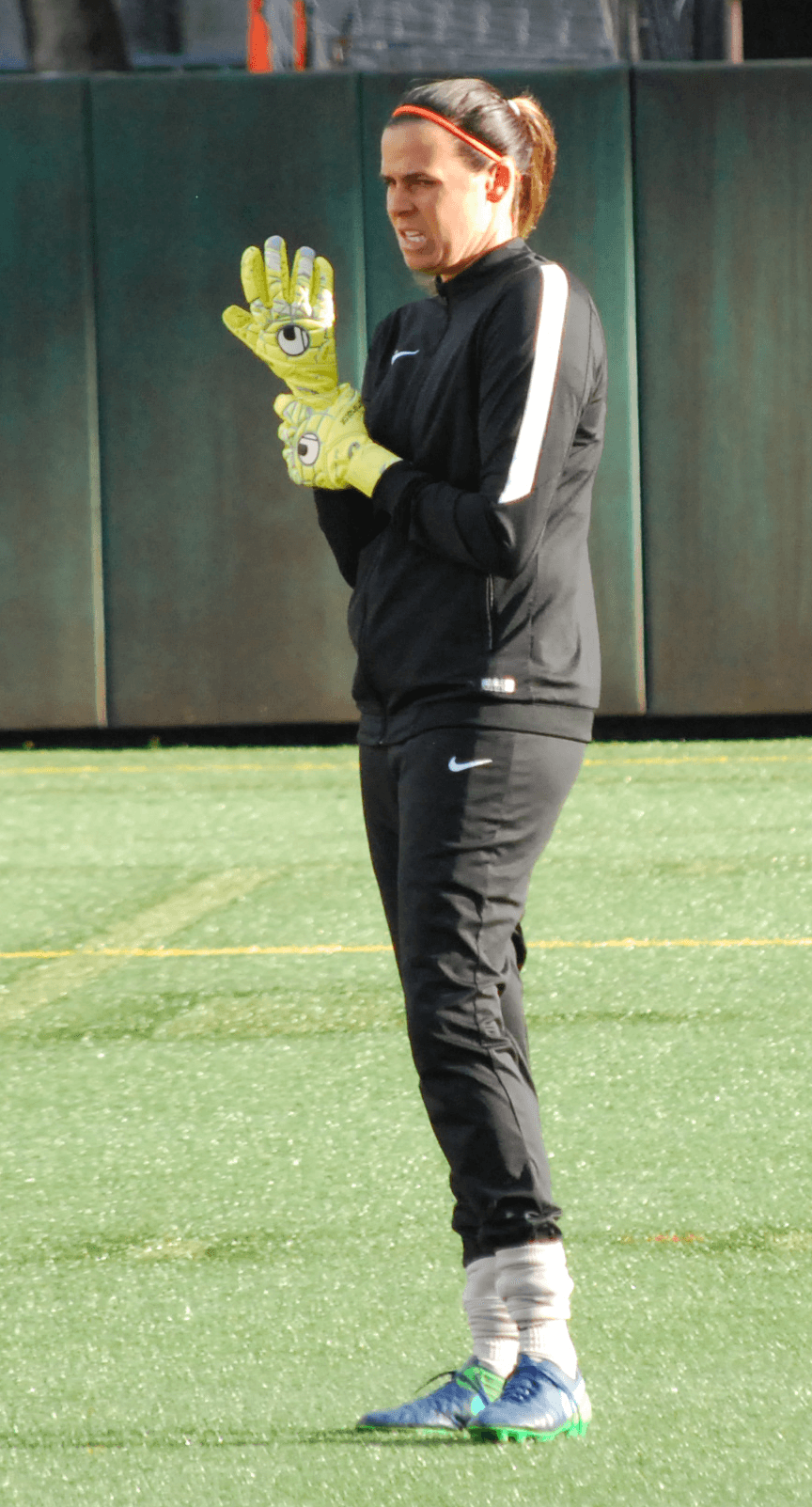
Williams warming up for Reign FC, April 2017

Returning to Houston for the 2017 season, Williams made 8 starts in goal before being traded to Seattle Reign FC on August 31 in exchange for a 2018 2nd-round draft pick. She made three starts in goal for the Reign during the remainder of the season. The Reign finished in fifth place during the regular season.

In October 2017, Williams commenced pre-season training with Melbourne City, re-signing with them for the 2017–18 W-League season. She made 12 starts in goal helping lead Melbourne City to a fourth-place season during the regular season and berth to the Finals. After defeating the regular season premiers, Brisbane Roar, in a 2–0 clean sheet in the semi-final, Melbourne City faced Sydney FC in the Grand Final and won 2–0, clinching the team's third consecutive title.

Williams was the starting goalkeeper for Reign FC in all 17 games that she played during the 2018 NWSL season. The Reign finished in third place during the regular season with a 11–5–8 record. The third-place finished earned the team a berth to the Playoffs, though they were defeated 2–1 by local rivals Portland Thorns FC in the semi-finals. She was one of three finalists for NWSL Goalkeeper of the Year in the 2018 season.

Williams returned to Melbourne City for the 2019–20 W-League season. She was the starting goalkeeper in 14 matches, recording nine clean sheets and an .871 (87.1%) save percentage. Melbourne City finished in first place during the regular season, claiming the premiership with an undefeated 12–0–1 record. During the playoffs, Williams helped elevate City to a 5–1 win in the team's semi-final match against Western Sydney Wanderers. Due to the COVID-19 pandemic, the Grand Final was not open to fans, though broadcast internationally. Williams helped hold Sydney FC to a 1–0 clean sheet to clinch the championship.

=== Arsenal: 2020–2022 ===
Williams signed a one-year contract with Arsenal in England's WSL in July 2020. She noted the "recent investment surge in European women's soccer" as a contributing factor to her signing. In late August, it was announced that she would be temporarily be sidelined by ankle surgery due to a pre-season injury. On 18 November 2020 Williams made her debut as she started in the FA Women's League Cup against North London derby rivals Tottenham Hotspur. The game finished 2–2 with Arsenal winning 5–4 on penalties. She made her league debut on 6 December 2020 against Birmingham City.

=== Paris Saint-Germain: 2022–2023 ===
On 21 July 2022, Division 1 Féminine club Paris Saint-Germain announced the signing of Williams on a one-year deal until June 2023. In January 2023, she left the club after playing two official matches for the team.

=== Brighton & Hove Albion: 2023 ===
On 19 January 2023, Williams joined Brighton & Hove Albion on a permanent transfer until June 2024.

=== Melbourne Victory: 2023–2025 ===
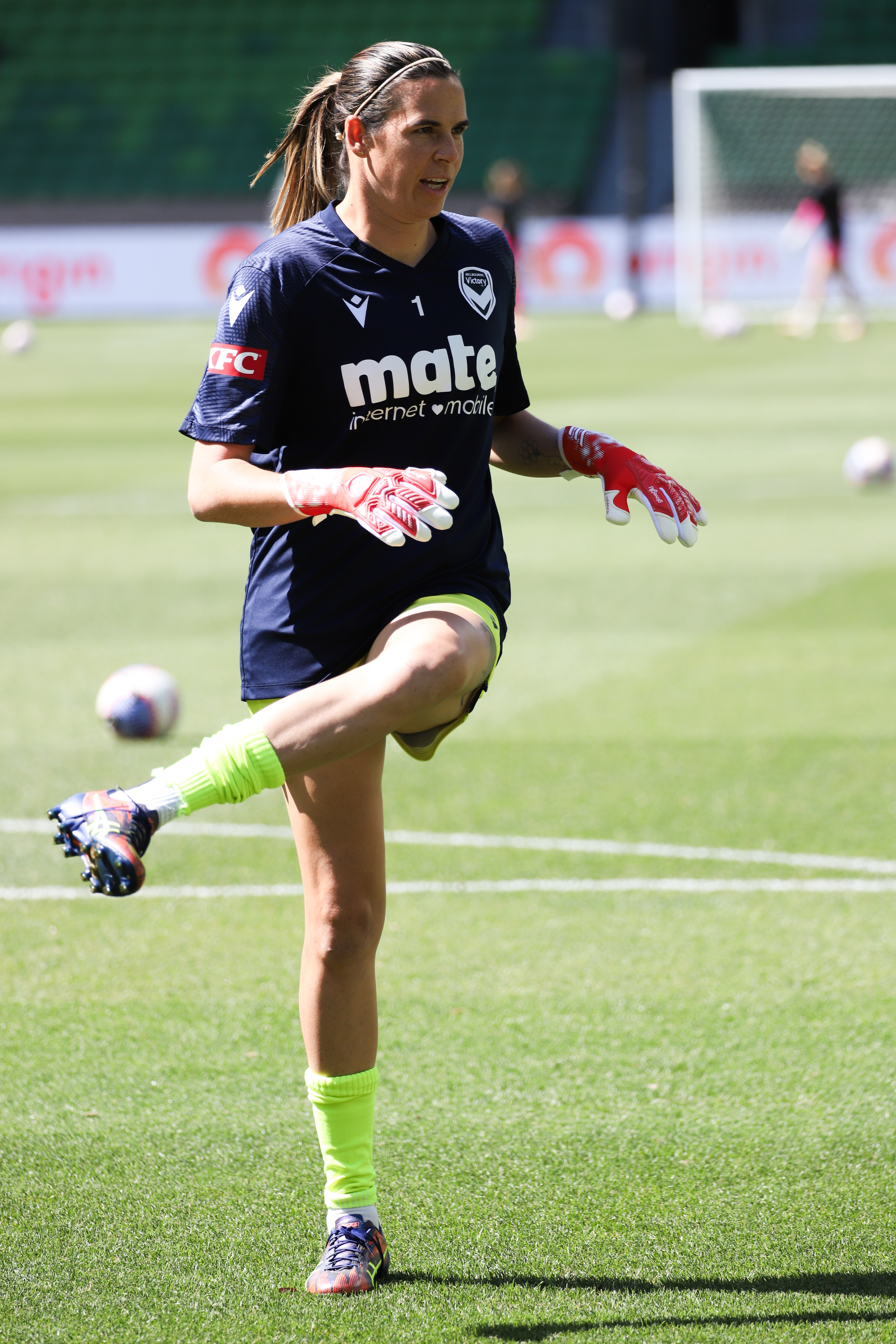
Lydia Williams before a match for Melbourne Victory, December 2023

In September 2023, Williams was signed by Australian club Melbourne Victory on an undisclosed transfer fee, signing a two-year contract. In August 2025, after not playing a season due to a wrist injury, Williams announced her retirement from football. Over her A-League career, spanning 2008–2025, she made a total of 131 appearances with various clubs and kept a then-record of 53 clean sheets.

== International career ==
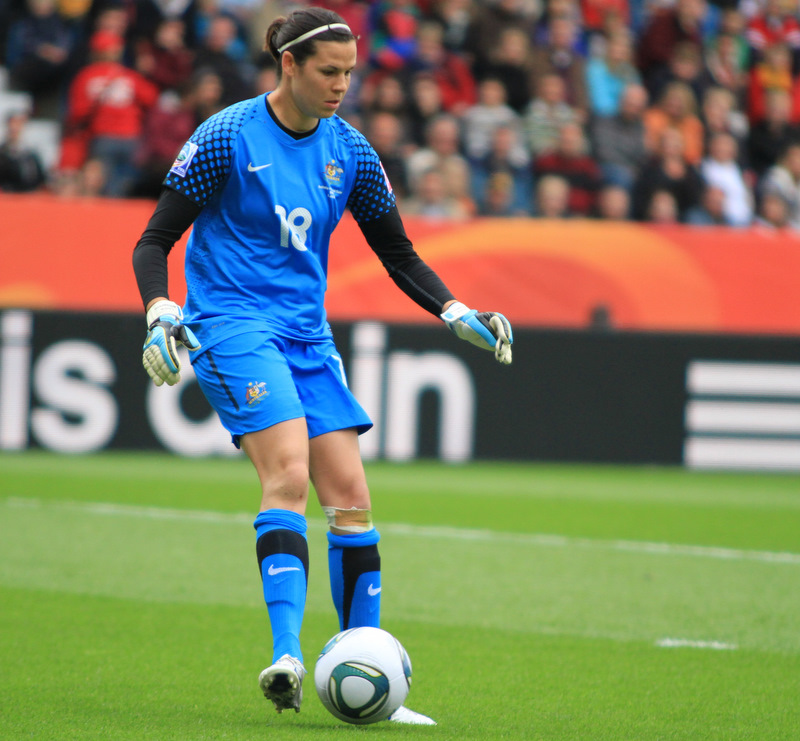
Williams playing for Australia at the 2011 FIFA Women's World Cup

Williams has represented Australia on the senior and under-20 national teams. She earned her first training camp call-up with the senior national team at age 15. It was the first time she'd heard of the Matildas. In 2006, she competed with Australia at the AFC Women's Asian Cup and 2006 FIFA World Under 20 Women's Championship.

At age 19, Williams was selected to the Matildas squad for the 2007 FIFA Women's World Cup in China, though she did not play. Australia finished second in their group and were knocked out by Brazil during a 3–2 quarterfinal match. She shared the starting goalkeeper role with veteran Matilda Melissa Barbieri at the 2011 FIFA Women's World Cup in Germany. During the team's first group stage match against Brazil, Barbieri helped keep the rivals to a 1–0 scoreline. Williams was the starting goalkeeper for Australia's next match against Equatorial Guinea and helped the Matildas win 3–2. Barbieri was in goal for the team's last group stage match: a 2–1 win over Norway. Australia finished second in their group and advanced to the quarterfinals where they were knocked out by Sweden 3–1 with Barbieri in goal.

Williams was the starting goalkeeper in all but one of Australia's matches at the 2015 FIFA Women's World Cup in Canada. The team lost 3–1 to the United States during their first group stage match with Barbieri between the posts. Williams helped hold Nigeria to a 2–0 clean sheet in the team's second group stage match and a 1–1 draw against Sweden. Australia finished second in the "Group of Death" and advanced to the Round of 16 where they faced Brazil. During the match, Williams' save on a long-range shot by Formiga made international headlines as the save of the tournament. In the 90th minute, Williams stopped Christiane's header marking 10th-ranked Australia's first win against Brazil in World Cup history. She finished the match with six saves and a clean sheet. The Matildas faced 2011 champions, Japan in the quarterfinals and narrowly lost 1–0 after a goal against in the 87th minute.

External videos
- One Plus One: Lydia Williams, One Plus One, ABC News

After qualifying for the 2016 Rio Olympics in Japan, the Matildas faced Canada in their first group stage match with Williams in goal. The team tied their next group stage match against Germany 2–2. After defeating Zimbabwe 6–1, the team finished third in Group F and top ranking in the third place teams advancing to the knockout stage. During their "thrilling" quarterfinal match against Brazil, Williams was put to the test in a penalty shootout after a 0–0 draw. Despite saving a penalty from Marta, the Matildas were ultimately edged out 7–6 during the shootout and knocked out of the competition.

Williams was the starting goalkeeper at the 2019 FIFA Women's World Cup in France — her fourth World Cup selection. During the team's first group stage match against Italy, a late Italian goal in the 5th minute of extratime resulted in a 2–1 surprising loss for the Matildas. They faced rivals Brazil next and won 3–2. After defeating Jamaica 4–1, Australia finished second in Group C and advanced to the Round of 16 where they faced Norway. After a 1–1 tie, Norway won 4–1 in penalties.

Williams was selected for the Australian women's soccer team which qualified for the Tokyo 2020 Olympics. The Matildas advanced to the quarter-finals with one victory and a draw in the group play. In the quarter-finals, they beat Great Britain 4–3 after extra time. However, they lost 1–0 to Sweden in the semi-final and were then beaten 4–3 in the bronze medal playoff by USA.

On 28 June 2022, she played her 100th match for Australia in a friendly match against Portugal. On 5 May 2024, Williams announced her retirement from international football, to take effect following the Paris 2024 Olympics. The keeper's final game for the Matildas was on 4 June at Stadium Australia in a friendly against China, which they won 2–0. Over her 104 appearances for Australia, Williams had kept a total of 31 clean sheets – second highest for a Matilda behind Melissa Barbieri's 34.

== Personal life ==
Williams has a pet dog named Caviar.

In August 2025, Williams announced on Instagram that she was pregnant with her first child.

She is a Christian.

== Honours ==
Canberra United FC

- W-League Championship: 2011–12
- W-League Premiership: 2011–12, 2013–14

Australia

- AFC Women's Asian Cup: 2010, 2018 (runners-up)
- AFF Women's Championship: 2008
- Tournament of Nations: 2017, 2018 (runners-up)
- FFA Cup of Nations: 2019

Individual

- Aboriginal and Islander Sports Hall of Fame
- Deadly Award for Female Sportsperson of the Year: 2006
- PFA Women's Footballer of the Year: 2011–12, 2015–16
- W-League Goalkeeper of the Year: 2010–11, 2011–12, 2016–17
- PFA W-League Team of the Season: 2016–17
- IFFHS AFC Woman Team of the Decade 2011–2020

== See also ==
- List of Indigenous Australian sportspeople
- List of players who have appeared in multiple FIFA Women's World Cups
- List of Reign FC players
- List of foreign Damallsvenskan players
- List of women's footballers with 100 or more international caps
