= 2013–14 W-League =

Sixth season of the top women's football (soccer) league in Australia

W-League
- Season: 2013–14
- Champions: Melbourne Victory (1st title)
- Premiers: Canberra United (2nd title)
- Matches: 48
- Goals: 166 (3.46 per match)
- Top goalscorer: Jodie Taylor (10)
- Biggest home win: Melbourne Victory 6–0 Newcastle Jets (7 December 2013); Sydney FC 8–2 Perth Glory (5 January 2014)
- Biggest away win: Melbourne Victory 1–5 Sydney FC (10 November 2013); Newcastle Jets 2–6 Brisbane Roar FC (4 January 2014)
- Highest scoring: Sydney FC 8–2 Perth Glory (5 January 2014)
- Longest winning run: Sydney FC, Canberra United (5)
- Longest unbeaten run: Melbourne Victory, Sydney FC (9)
- Longest winless run: Newcastle Jets (12)
- Longest losing run: Newcastle Jets (11)

The 2013–14 W-League season was the sixth season of the W-League, the Australian national women's association football competition. The season consisted of twelve matchdays followed by a finals series. The regular season started on 9 November 2013 and concluded on 9 February 2014. The Grand Final took place on 23 February 2014.

Canberra United won the regular season, winning the Premier title. Melbourne Victory won the play-offs for the overall championship title. Melbourne's Jessica Fishlock was named W-League player of the season by Australian media.

== Clubs ==
W-League teams for the 2013–14 season:

Team	City	Years in competition
Adelaide United	(South Australia) Adelaide, SA	2008–09 — present
Brisbane Roar	(Queensland) Brisbane, Qld	2008–09 — present
Canberra United	(Australian Capital Territory) Canberra, ACT	2008–09 — present
Melbourne Victory	(Victoria (state)) Melbourne, Vic	2008–09 — present
Newcastle Jets	(New South Wales) Newcastle, NSW	2008–09 — present
Perth Glory	(Western Australia) Perth, WA	2008–09 — present
Sydney FC	(New South Wales) Sydney, NSW	2008–09 — present
Western Sydney Wanderers	(New South Wales) Sydney, NSW	2012–13 — present

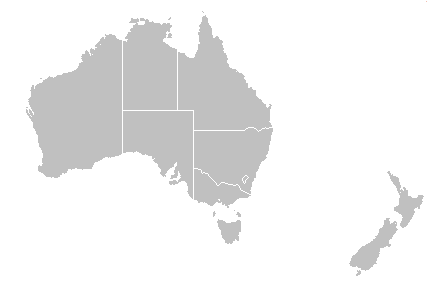

=== Personnel and kits ===
Team	Manager	Captain	Kit manufacturer
Adelaide United	(Australia) Ross Aloisi	(England) Kristy Moore	Adidas
Brisbane Roar	(Australia) Belinda Wilson	(Australia) Clare Polkinghorne	Puma
Canberra United	(Netherlands) Liesbeth Migchelsen	(Australia) Nicole Sykes	Hummel
Melbourne Victory	(England) David Edmondson	(Australia) Stephanie Catley	Adidas
Newcastle Jets	(Australia) Peter McGuinness	(Australia) Gema Simon	ISC
Perth Glory	(Australia) Jamie Harnwell	(Australia) Collette McCallum	Macron
Sydney FC	(Australia) Alen Stajcic	(Australia) Danielle Brogan	Adidas
Western Sydney Wanderers	(Australia) Stephen Roche	(Australia) Heather Garriock	Nike

=== Foreign players ===
Club	Visa 1	Visa 2	Visa 3	Non-Visa foreigner(s)	Former player(s)
Adelaide United	(England) Laura Stockdale	(Norway) Lisa-Marie Woods	(Scotland) Louise Mason	(England) Kristy Moore^{A}	
Brisbane Roar	(Germany) Nadine Angerer				
Canberra United	(United States) Kendall Fletcher	(United States) Lori Lindsey	(United States) Stephanie Ochs		
Melbourne Victory	(New Zealand) Katie Hoyle	(Sweden) Jessica Samuelsson	(Wales) Jess Fishlock	(Turkey) Gülcan Koca^{A} (United States) Lauren Barnes^{G}	
Newcastle Jets	(England) Hannah Beard	(Republic of Ireland) Ciara McCormack		(England) Stacey Day^{B}	
Perth Glory	(Canada) Sasha Andrews	(Denmark) Cecilie Sandvej	(United States) Chantel Jones	(Wales) Carys Hawkins^{A}	(Canada) Christina Julien^{G}
Sydney FC	(England) Jodie Taylor	(New Zealand) Anna Green	(New Zealand) Emma Kete		
Western Sydney Wanderers	(United States) Shawna Gordon	(United States) Tori Huster	(United States) Camille Levin		

The following do not fill a Visa position:
^{A} Australian citizens who have chosen to represent another national team;
^{B} Those players who were born and started their professional career abroad but have since gained Australian citizenship;
^{G} Guest Players

== Regular season ==
=== League table ===
Pos	Team	Pld	W	D	L	GF	GA	GD	Pts	Qualification
1	Canberra United	12	9	0	3	28	8	+20	27	Qualification to Finals series
2	Sydney FC	12	8	2	2	37	14	+23	26	Qualification to Finals series
3	Melbourne Victory (C)	12	7	2	3	23	12	+11	23	Qualification to Finals series
4	Brisbane Roar	12	7	2	3	22	16	+6	23	Qualification to Finals series
5	Perth Glory	12	5	0	7	17	31	−14	15	
6	Adelaide United	12	3	4	5	12	15	−3	13	
7	Western Sydney Wanderers	12	2	3	7	17	23	−6	9	
8	Newcastle Jets	12	0	1	11	10	47	−37	1	

Source: au.soccerway.com
Rules for classification: 1) points; 2) goal difference; 3) number of goals scored.
(C) Champions

=== Fixtures ===
Individual matches are collated at each club's season article.

== Finals series ==
Semi-finals
2	Sydney FC	2
3	Melbourne Victory	3
1	Canberra United	1
4	Brisbane Roar	2

Grand Final
3	Melbourne Victory	2
4	Brisbane Roar	0

=== Semi-finals ===
15 February 2014	Canberra United	1–2	Brisbane Roar	McKellar Park, Canberra
15:00 AEDT	Munoz 23'	Report	Carroll 4'; Kellond-Knight 58'	Attendance: 1,148; Referee: Kirralee Andruschak

16 February 2014	Sydney FC	2–3	Melbourne Victory	Jubilee Oval, Sydney
15:00 AEDT	Kerr 45+1'; L. Khamis 52'	Report	Fishlock 22'; Humble 36'; Barnes 71' (pen.)	Referee: Kate Jacewicz

=== Grand final ===
23 February 2014	Melbourne Victory	2–0	Brisbane Roar	Lakeside Stadium, Melbourne
15:00 AEDT	De Vanna 38'; Barnes 41'	Report		Attendance: 2,504; Referee: Casey Reibelt

== Season statistics ==
=== Leading goalscorers ===
Updated to after game 9 February 2014.

Total	Player		Club	Goals per Game											
Total	Player		Club	1	2	3	4	5	6	7	8	9	10	11	12
10	(England)	Jodie Taylor	Sydney FC	1	2		1			1		2	1	2	
7	(Australia)	Caitlin Friend	Melbourne Victory		1	1	3			1	1				
7	(Australia)	Lisa De Vanna	Melbourne Victory		1	1			1		1		3		
7	(Australia)	Michelle Heyman	Canberra United	2	1	1		1				1		1	
6	(Australia)	Catherine Cannuli	Western Sydney Wanderers	1		1	1		2					1	
6	(Australia)	Kate Gill	Perth Glory	1						1			1	1	2
6	(United States)	Stephanie Ochs	Canberra United		1			2	1			1			1
5	(Australia)	Caitlin Foord	Sydney FC							3	2				
5	(Australia)	Nicola Bolger	Sydney FC	2			1			1	1				
5	(Australia)	Katrina Gorry	Brisbane Roar			3					1				1

Goal scored from penalty kick

=== Own goals ===
Player		Team	Against	Round
(Australia)	Teigen Allen	Western Sydney Wanderers	Sydney FC	4
(Australia)	Linda O'Neill	Western Sydney Wanderers	Melbourne Victory	9

== International Competition ==
The W-League was represented in the second edition of the International Women's Club Championship, known for sponsorship reasons as the Mobcast Cup.

Sydney FC (the winners of the 2012–13 season) participated in the tournament, which took place from 30 November until 8 December 2013, and finished in third place (out of 5 teams).

== See also ==
- 2013–14 Adelaide United W-League season
- 2013–14 Brisbane Roar W-League season
- 2013–14 Canberra United W-League season
- 2013–14 Melbourne Victory W-League season
- 2013–14 Newcastle Jets W-League season
- 2013–14 Perth Glory W-League season
- 2013–14 Sydney FC W-League season
- 2013–14 Western Sydney Wanderers W-League season
