= 2013 W-League grand final =

2012–2013 W-League grand final
- Event: 2012–13 W-League
Melbourne Victory FC	Sydney FC
1	3
- Date: 27 January 2013
- Venue: AAMI Park, Melbourne, Victoria, Australia
- Referee: Kate Jacewicz
- Attendance: 4,181

The 2012–13 W-League grand final took place at AAMI Park in Melbourne, Australia on 27 January 2013. It was the final match in the W-League 2012–13 season, and was played between third-placed Melbourne Victory and fourth-placed Sydney FC. Sydney FC won the match 3–1 thanks to goals by Nicola Bolger, Samantha Kerr and Kyah Simon.

== Match details ==
27 January 2013
15:30 AEDT

Melbourne Victory FC	1–3	Sydney FC
Larsson 41'	Report	Bolger 25'; Kerr 48'; Simon 86' (pen.)

AAMI Park, Melbourne
Attendance: 4,181
Referee: Kate Jacewicz

Melbourne Victory	Sydney FC

MELBOURNE VICTORY:
GK	1	(Australia) Brianna Davey
DF	2	(United States) Danielle Johnson (c)
DF	3	(Australia) Maika Ruyter-Hooley	(red card) 84'
DF	4	(New Zealand) Rebekah Stott
MF	17	(Turkey) Gulcan Koca
MF	6	(Sweden) Petra Larsson
MF	7	(Australia) Stephanie Catley
MF	14	(Australia) Enza Barilla
MF	15	(Australia) Amy Jackson
FW	5	(Australia) Laura Spiranovic
FW	10	(United States) Jessica McDonald		(substituted off) 73'
Substitutes:
DF	23	(Australia) Jessica Humble		(substituted on) 73'
GK	20	(Australia) Cassandra Dimovski
MF	9	(Australia) Tiffany Eliadis
MF	18	(Timor-Leste) Cindy Lay
FW	11	(Australia) Caitlin Friend
Manager:
(Australia) Fabrizio Soncin

SYDNEY FC:
GK	20	(Australia) Sham Khamis
DF	3	(Australia) Elizabeth Ralston
MF	9	(Australia) Caitlin Foord
DF	2	(Australia) Teresa Polias
MF	7	(Australia) Nicola Bolger	(substituted off) 80'
MF	10	(Australia) Renee Rollason
MF	11	(Australia) Annalie Longo	(substituted off) 91'
MF	14	(Australia) Alanna Kennedy
FW	4	(Australia) Sam Kerr
FW	12	(Australia) Chloe Logarzo	(substituted off) 88'
FW	17	(Australia) Kyah Simon (c)
Substitutes:
FW	13	(Australia) Larissa Crummer	(substituted on) 80'
MF	6	(Australia) Natalie Tobin	(substituted on) 88'
MF	18	(Australia) Brittany Whitfield	(substituted on) 91'
GK	1	(Australia) Sian McLaren
DF	8	(Australia) Amy Harrison
Manager:
(Australia) Alen Stajcic

Assistant referees:
Alison Flynn
Sarah Ho
Fourth official:
Casey Reibelt

== Match statistics ==
Overall
Statistic	Melbourne Victory	Sydney FC
Goals scored	1	3
Total shots	13	10
Shots on target	5	9
Ball possession	57%	43%
Corner kicks	9	7
Fouls committed	5	10
Yellow cards	0	0
Red cards	1	0

== See also ==
- W-League records and statistics
