= Jessica Humble =

Australian soccer player

Personal information
- Full name: Jessica Kate Humble
- Date of birth: 5 July 1986 (age 40)
- Place of birth: Mitcham, Victoria, Australia
- Height: 1.64 m (5 ft 5 in)
- Position: Defender

Senior career*
Years	Team	Apps	(Gls)
2009	Melbourne Victory	1	(0)
2012–2014	Melbourne Victory	22	(1)
- * Club domestic league appearances and goals as of 23 February 2014

Jessica Kate Humble (born 5 July 1986) is an Australian former soccer player who played as a defender. She last played for Australian W-League team Melbourne Victory.

== Playing career ==
=== Club ===
==== Melbourne Victory: 2009, 2012–2014 ====
After playing one match for the Melbourne Victory in 2009, Humble was called into the team as an injury replacement during the 2012–13 W-League season. She made eight appearances for the club playing in the defender position. The Victory finished the regular season in third place and advanced to the semifinals.

Humble returned to the Victory for the 2013–14 season. During her 14 appearances for the team, she scored one goal and helped lead the team to the Grand Final where the Victory defeated Brisbane Roar 2–0. The win marked the Victory's first Grand Final title in the history of the team.

== Honours ==
Team

- W-League Grand Final Runners Up: 2013
- W-League Grand Final Winners: 2014
