= Cassandra Dimovski =

Australian football goalkeeper

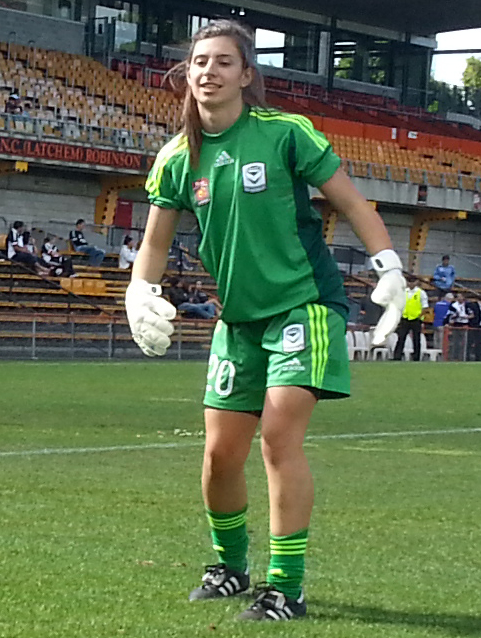
- Dimovski playing for Melbourne Victory in 2012

Personal information
- Full name: Cassandra Sue Dimovski
- Date of birth: 27 December 1993 (age 32)
- Place of birth: Bundoora, Melbourne, Victoria, Australia
- Height: 1.65 m (5 ft 5 in)
- Position: Goalkeeper

Senior career*
| Years | Team | Apps | (Gls) |
| 2011–2016 | Melbourne Victory | 11 | (0) |
- * Club domestic league appearances and goals as of 28 October 2016

Cassandra Dimovski (born 27 December 1993) is an Australian football (soccer) goalkeeper who most recently played for the Melbourne Victory in the W-League, the top division of women's soccer in Australia.

== Early life ==
Dimovski was raised in Lower Plenty, a suburb of Melbourne, Victoria where she attended Templestowe College. At age 14, she was scouted by a teacher to play for club team Eltham Redbacks. Originally playing as a midfielder, she changed to the goalkeeper position. Dimovski also played for club team Box Hill Inter where she played with Matildas goalkeeper and captain Melissa Barbieri.

== Playing career ==
=== Club ===
==== Melbourne Victory, 2011–2016 ====
Primarily playing for the Melbourne Victory as a backup goalkeeper, Dimovski earned caps for the team in December 2013 after the team's primary goalkeeper Brianna Davey was injured and helped the team finish third during the regular season. After advancing to the playoffs, the Victory eventually won the Grand Final.

In October 2015, it was announced that Dimovski was one of three Australian Victory players to return to the squad for the 2015–16 season.

=== International ===
In 2012, Dimovski played for the Victorian National Training Centre (NTC) Girls Team in consideration for the senior national team.

== Honours ==
Team

- W-League Grand Final Runners Up: 2013
- W-League Grand Final Winners: 2014
