= Emily Hulbert =

English-born Australian soccer player

Personal information
- Full name: Emily Hulbert
- Date of birth: 20 December 1995 (age 30)
- Place of birth: England
- Position: Midfielder

Youth career
- 2005–2012: Monbulk Rangers Soccer Club

College career
| Years | Team | Apps | (Gls) |
| 2014–2017 | Hofstra Pride | 68 | (4) |

Senior career*
| Years | Team | Apps | (Gls) |
| 2013 | Box Hill United | 26 | (3) |
| 2013–2014 | Melbourne Victory | 5 | (0) |
- * Club domestic league appearances and goals as of 23 February 2014

Emily Hulbert (born 20 December 1995) is an Australian footballer, who last played in Australia for Melbourne Victory in the Australian W-League. During that season, she suffered from glandular fever, which caused her to have a three-month absence from football.

Emily currently plays for the Hofstra University Women's team in Hempstead, NY, while she studies physics at Hofstra.
