= Beattie Goad =

Australian soccer player

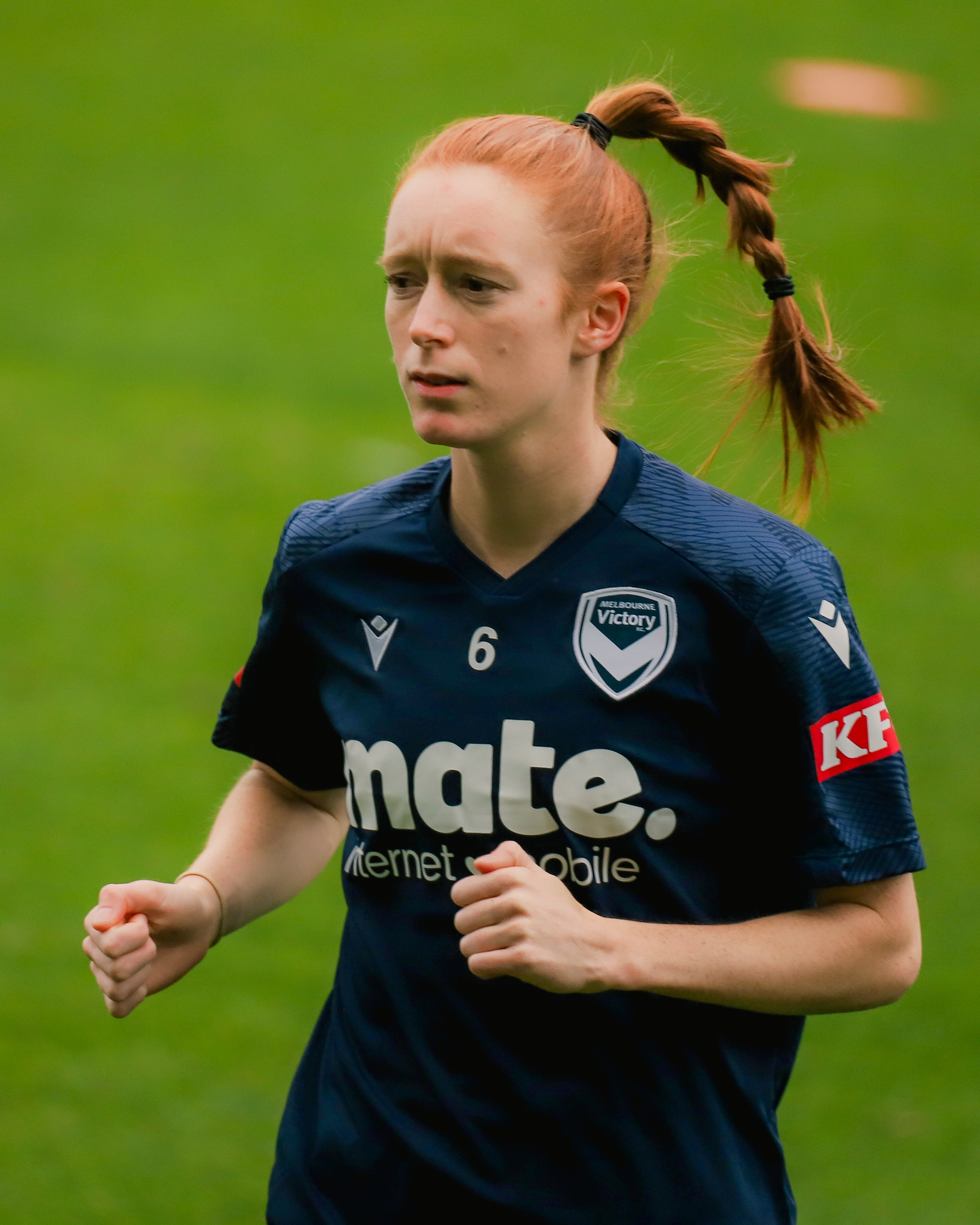
- Beattie Goad warming up for a match for Melbourne Victory, December 2023

Personal information
- Full name: Beatrice Southby Goad
- Date of birth: 31 May 1997 (age 29)
- Place of birth: Melbourne, Australia
- Height: 5 ft 7 in (1.70 m)
- Positions: Central midfielder; attacking midfielder

Youth career
- EAP

College career
| Years | Team | Apps | (Gls) |
| 2016–2019 | Stanford Cardinal | 88 | (7) |

Senior career*
| Years | Team | Apps | (Gls) |
| 2013–2015 | Melbourne Victory | 21 | (2) |
| 2015–2016 | Melbourne City | 14 | (4) |
| 2020–2021 | Meppen | 22 | (0) |
| 2021–2022 | UDG Tenerife | 18 | (1) |
| 2022–2024 | Melbourne Victory | 40 | (3) |
| 2023 | Bulleen Lions | 10 | (2) |

International career^{‡}
- Australia U17
- Australia U20
| 2021 | Australia | 3 | (0) |
- * Club domestic league appearances and goals as of 8 January 2025 ‡ National team caps and goals as of 10 June 2021

Beatrice "Beattie" Southby Goad (born 31 May 1997) is an Australian former professional soccer player who played in the Australian A-League Women for Melbourne Victory and Melbourne City, for Stanford University in the USA's NCAA Division I, for SV Meppen in the German 1. Liga, and for UDG Tenerife in the Spanish Primera División.

== Club career ==
=== Melbourne Victory ===
Goad was Melbourne Victory's youngest goalscorer and the youngest ever Victorian to play in a Grand Final.

=== Melbourne City ===
In September 2015, Goad joined rival club Melbourne City for their inaugural season.

=== Stanford University ===
In February 2016, following a stellar season with Melbourne City and enjoying academic success, earning a place in the top 1% of students in Victoria, Goad joined Stanford University on a four-year program.

=== SV Meppen ===
In August 2020, Goad signed for Frauen-Bundesliga side SV Meppen.

=== Return to Melbourne Victory ===
In September 2022, Goad returned to Australia, re-joining Melbourne Victory. In December 2024, Goad retired from football.

== International career ==
Goad earned her first national team cap in April 2021, appearing as a substitute against Germany in a friendly match.

== Personal life ==
Goad graduated from Stanford University in 2020 with a Bachelor of Science majoring in Human Biology with a Medical Anthropology minor, and is currently studying medicine at the University of Melbourne.

== Honours ==
Stanford Cardinal

- NCAA Division I Women's Soccer Championship: 2017, 2019
