= Jessica Wik =

Swedish footballer

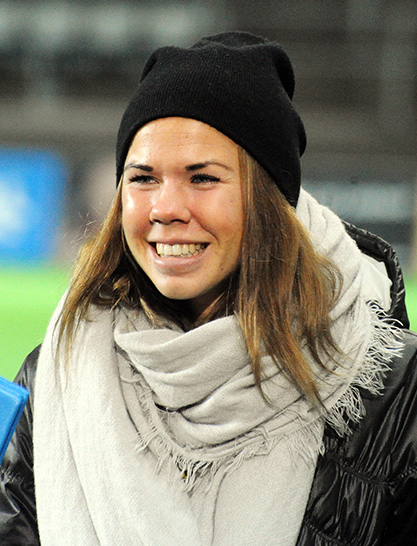
- Wik in 2014

Personal information
- Full name: Jessica Marie Wik
- Birth name: Jessica Marie Samuelsson
- Date of birth: 30 January 1992 (age 34)
- Place of birth: Saltsjö-Boo, Sweden
- Height: 1.66 m (5 ft 5 in)
- Position: Full back

Team information
- Current team: IFK Norrköping
- Number: 15

Youth career
- Åby IF

Senior career*
Years	Team	Apps	(Gls)
2007–2009	Smedby AIS		
2010–2017	Linköpings FC	133	(7)
2013–2014	→ Melbourne Victory (loan)	13	(0)
2017–2019	Arsenal	10	(0)
2019–2024	FC Rosengård	24	(1)
2025–	IFK Norrköping	0	(0)

International career^{‡}
2011–	Sweden	54	(0)
Medal record
Olympic Games
Silver medal – second place	2016 Rio de Janeiro	Team
- * Club domestic league appearances and goals as of 17:21, 4 November 2018 (UTC) ‡ National team caps and goals as of 20 September 2017

Jessica Marie Wik (née Samuelsson, born 30 January 1992) is a Swedish professional footballer who plays as a defender for IFK Norrköping and the Swedish national team. In the 2013–14 winter season she played for Australian W-League club Melbourne Victory. She is predominantly a left back, although she also plays on the right side.

== Club career ==
=== Linköping, 2010–17 ===
Wik joined Linköpings FC from Smedby AIS on a three-year contract in 2010, but was initially loaned back to Smedby. In November 2011 she extended her contract with Linköpings after winning her place in the first team.

=== Melbourne Victory, 2013–14 ===
Wik joined Melbourne Victory ahead of the 2013–14 season, and was named the 2014 Player of the Year in Australia.

=== Arsenal, 2017–19 ===
On 18 August 2017, Arsenal announced that they had signed Wik ahead of the new season. In March 2019 Wik left Arsenal to play for FC Rosengård.

=== FC Rosengård, 2019– ===
Wik returned to Sweden in 2019 to increase her chances of being named to the national team squad for the 2019 FIFA Women's World Cup in France. She signed with FC Rosengård and played in seven games during the 2019 Damallsvenskan season. Rosengård finished the season in first place with a 14–1–7 record.

After returning to Rosengård for the 2020 Damallsvenskan season, Wik was a starting defender in 15 of the 18 matches she played. During a match against Kopparbergs/Göteborg FC on 23 August, she scored the team's second goal of the match in Rosengård's 3–0 win. Rosengård finished in second place with a 14–3–5 record.

== International career ==
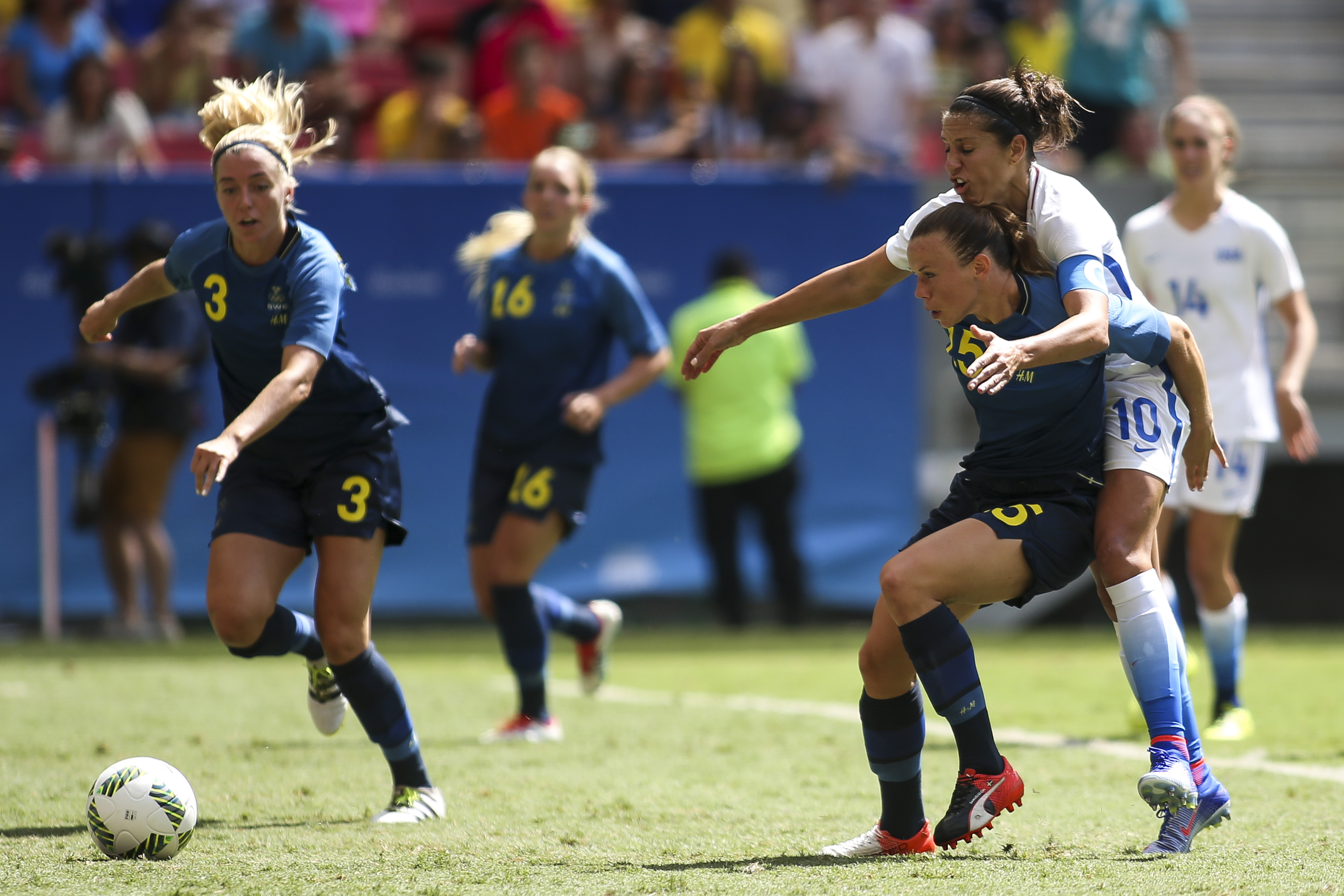
Samuellson (in blue, right) defends against Carli Lloyd during the quarterfinals of the 2016 Summer Olympics

Wik made her debut for the senior Sweden team in a 2–1 loss to Canada on 22 November 2011. Later Coach Pia Sundhage named Wik in the Sweden squad for UEFA Women's Euro 2013.

== Honours ==
=== Club ===
Melbourne Victory FC

- W-League: 2013–14

Linköpings FC

- Svenska Cupen: 2013–14, 2014–15
- Svenska Supercupen: 2010
- Damallsvenskan: 2016

Arsenal

- WSL Cup: 2017–18

FC Rosengård

- Damallsvenskan: 2019, 2021, 2022, 2024
- Svenska Cupen: 2021–22

=== International ===
Sweden

- UEFA Women's Under-19 Championship: 2012 UEFA Women's Under-19 Championship
- Summer Olympic Games: Silver Medal, 2016
