= Lauren Barnes =

American soccer player (born 1989)

Lauren "Lu" Barnes
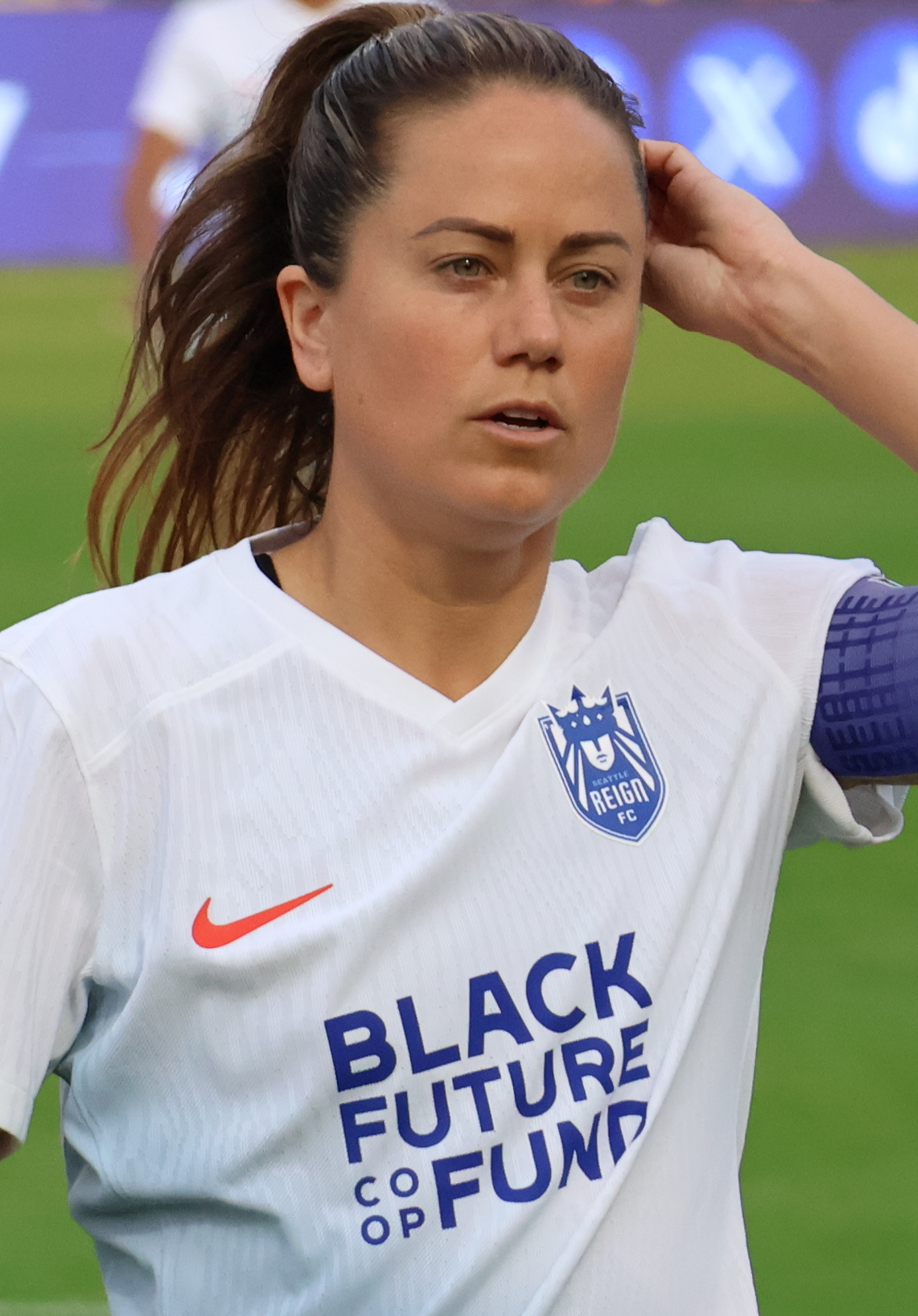
- Barnes with the Seattle Reign in 2024

Personal information
- Full name: Lauren Kate Barnes
- Date of birth: May 31, 1989 (age 37)
- Place of birth: Arcadia, California, United States
- Height: 5 ft 5 in (1.65 m)
- Positions: Center back; left back

Team information
- Current team: Seattle Reign (interim assistant coach)

Youth career
- Arsenal FC
- Beach FC

College career
Years	Team	Apps	(Gls)
2007–2010	UCLA Bruins		

Senior career*
Years	Team	Apps	(Gls)
2011	Philadelphia Independence	0	(0)
2013–2025	Seattle Reign	252	(2)
2014	→ Melbourne Victory (loan)	15	(4)
2016–2020	→ Melbourne City (loan)	26	(0)
2020	→ Kristianstads DFF (loan)	11	(0)
2026	Salmon Bay FC	3	(0)
Total		307	(6)

International career
2007	United States U20		
2010	United States U23		

Managerial career
- 2026–: Seattle Reign (interim assistant)
Medal record
Women's soccer
Representing the United States
Pan American Games
Silver medal – second place	2007 Rio de Janeiro	Team
- * Club domestic league appearances and goals as of July 18, 2026

Lauren Kate Barnes (born May 31, 1989) is an American former professional soccer player who is an interim assistant coach for Seattle Reign FC of the National Women's Soccer League (NWSL). She played 13 seasons in the NWSL for the Reign, setting league records for career appearances, starts, and minutes played. A four-time NWSL Best XI or Second XI selection and the NWSL Defender of the Year in 2016, she won three NWSL Shields with the Reign (2014, 2015, and 2022).

Barnes played college soccer for the UCLA Bruins and was drafted by the Philadelphia Independence in the third round of the 2011 WPS Draft. When the NWSL was created, she was selected by the Reign in the second round of the 2013 NWSL supplemental draft. She also played on loan with Melbourne Victory and Melbourne City, winning multiple league championships in Australia, and Swedish club Kristianstads DFF. She represented the United States on the under-15, under-20, and under-23 national teams.

== Early life ==
Barnes was born in Arcadia, California, to parents Joyce and Gary Barnes. She attended Upland High School in Upland, California, where she was a four-time first-team All-CIF selection. She was rated as the number two overall recruit in the nation by RISE Magazine and Soccer Buzz and was named Gatorade Player of the Year for the state of California. In 2005 and 2006 she was named Parade All-American, NSCAA/adidas Girls Youth All-American, and 2006 CIF-Southern Section Co-Player of the Year. In addition to her high school play, Barnes played for local club soccer team, Arsenal FC.

== College career ==
Barnes attended UCLA where she played for the Bruins from 2007 to 2010. During her freshman year, she finished the season with one goal and three assists for a total of five points. She was one of six players and just two freshmen to start all 24 matches for the team. She was named to the Soccer America Freshman All-American and Pac-10 All-Freshman Teams. She scored her lone goal for the season in a 3–1 victory over Arizona State and assisted on the game-winning goal in a 3–2 NCAA Quarterfinal victory over University of Portland.

During her sophomore year, Barnes appeared in all 25 matches, starting 24. She ended the season with six points (six assists). Barnes helped the UCLA defense rank first in the country in goals against average (0.23), allowing only six goals in 25 matches. In 2009, Barnes was one of just three players who started all 25 matches and ranked fourth on the team in scoring with 14 points (two goals and ten assists). She tied with Lauren Cheney for the team lead in assists with 10. Barnes scored the game-winning goal in a 3–2 double-overtime victory over Arizona State.

During her senior year, Barnes played and started 22 of 23 matches. She was a leader of the Bruin defense that surrendered less than a goal a game (0.84). Under her direction, the defense posted nine shutouts in 23 matches. She was also a contributor for the offense, ranking second on the team in scoring with 16 points (scoring five goals and providing six assists). She scored game-winning goals in wins over San Diego and Washington State and assisted on the game-winning goal in a 2–1 victory over the University of Central Florida in the NCAA Second Round. She was a First-Team All-Pac-10 selection and named Third-Team NSCAA All-American.

== Club career ==
=== Philadelphia Independence, 2011 ===
Barnes was selected in the third round (fifteenth overall) of the 2011 WPS Draft by the Philadelphia Independence. She was included on the bench for nine matches, but did not make an appearance. The Independence finished second during the regular season with a 13–4–3 record. The team advanced to the playoffs where they defeated magicJack 2–0 in the Super Semifinal. They faced regular season winners Western New York Flash in the WPS Final where they were defeated 5–4 in penalty kicks after a 1–1 draw.

=== Seattle Reign FC, 2013–2025 ===
External videos
- Barnes' last-minute save vs FC Kansas City on June 9, 2013 retrieved August 24, 2013

Barnes was selected by the Seattle Reign FC during the 2013 NWSL Supplemental Draft as their second pick (tenth pick overall). Barnes was key component in the Reign's defense playing primarily as a center-back for the squad throughout the 2013 season. During a home match against FC Kansas City on June 9, 2013, her defensive skill was especially highlighted when she reached a shot just before it crossed the goal line that had bounced over goalkeeper Hope Solo's head. With a diving tackle into the netting, Barnes tipped the ball over the crossbar and out of the goal. Along with teammate Christine Nairn, Barnes was one of only two players on the Reign to play in all 22 matches during the 2013 season. She was the only player to start every game tallying 1,949 minutes. After the season ended, Barnes earned team honors for Defender of the Year.

==== Loan to Melbourne Victory, 2014 ====
In January 2014, Barnes joined Seattle Reign FC teammate Jess Fishlock on the Melbourne Victory squad in Australia's W-League as a guest player from the Reign. During her five appearances for the team, she scored two goals and helped the team win the Grand Final where the Victory defeated Brisbane Roar 2–0. Barnes scored the Victory's second goal of the match. The win marked the Victory's first Grand Final title in the history of the team.

Following her successful guest stint, Barnes signed with Melbourne Victory the following season on a loan deal.

==== 2014–2015 ====
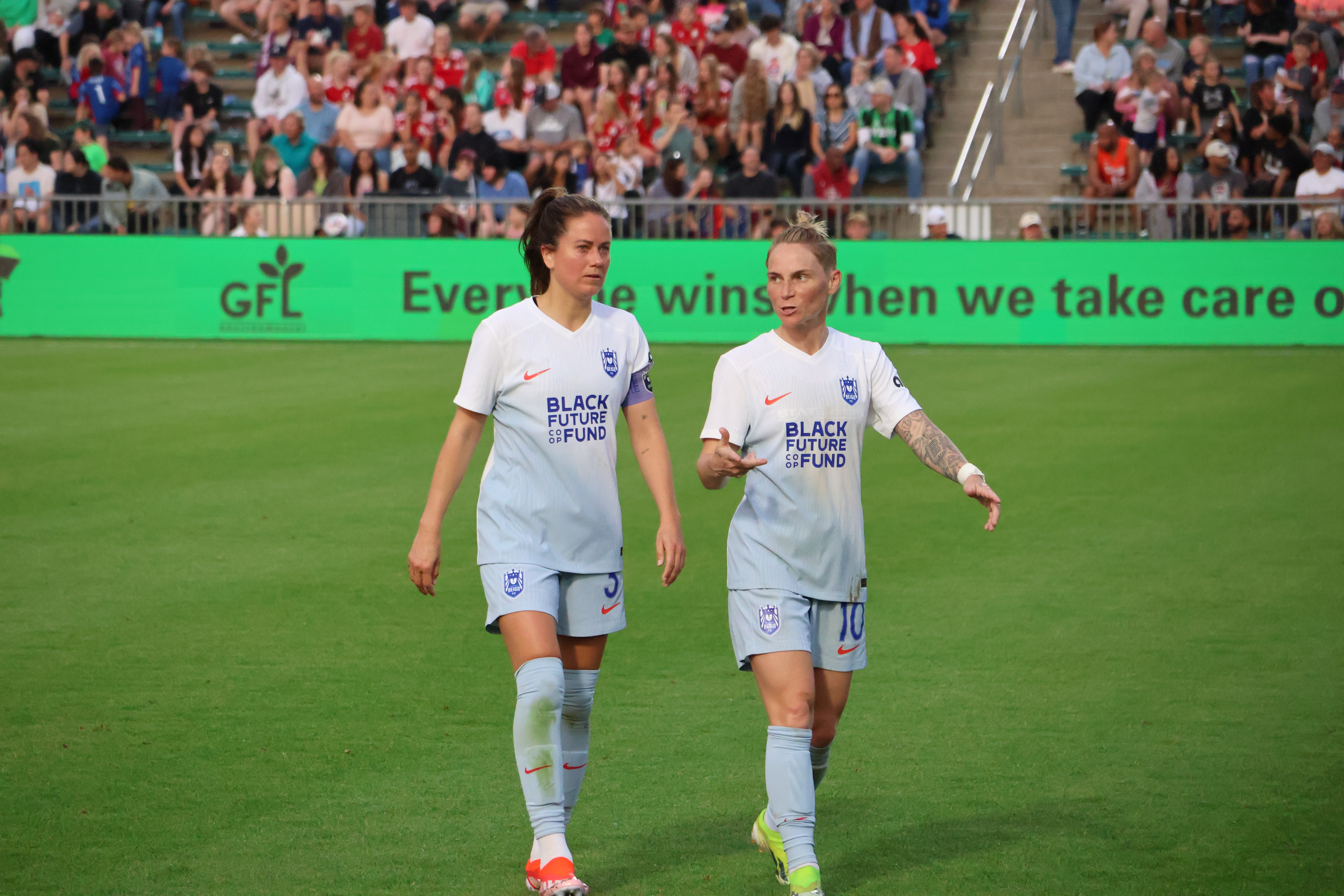
Captain Barnes with teammate Jess Fishlock during a match against North Carolina Courage, April 2024

Barnes returned to the Reign for the 2014 season. The team set a league record unbeaten streak of 16 games during the first part of the season. During the 16 game stretch, the Reign compiled a 13–0–3 record. The Reign finished first in the regular season clinching the NWSL Shield for the first time. After defeating the Washington Spirit 2–1 in the playoff semi-finals, the Reign were defeated 2–1 by FC Kansas City during the championship final. Following the regular season, Barnes along with goalkeeper Hope Solo and fellow defender Stephanie Cox were named to the Second XI team. Barnes finished the 2014 season having started in 22 of the 23 games in which she played.

After returning to the Reign for the 2015 season, Barnes started in all 20 games of the regular season playing for all 1,800 minutes in the defender position. During an away match against Sky Blue FC on May 9, she scored an equalizer goal resulting in a 1–1 draw. Barnes served two assists throughout the season. The Reign finished the regular season in first place clinching the NWSL Shield for the second consecutive time. After advancing to the playoffs, Seattle faced fourth-place team Washington Spirit and won 3–0, advancing to the championship final. Seattle was ultimately defeated 1–0 by FC Kansas City during the championship final in Portland. Barnes, along with teammates Kim Little, Beverly Yanez, and Jess Fishlock were named to the NWSL Best XI team, and she was a finalist for NWSL Defender of the Year.

==== Loan to Melbourne City, 2016–2020 ====
In October 2016, Barnes signed a loan deal with Melbourne City, alongside Seattle Reign FC teammate Jess Fishlock, with whom she previously played at Melbourne Victory. In October 2017, she commenced pre-season training with Melbourne City, re-signing with them for the 2017–18 W-League season. Barnes went on to be awarded Melbourne City W-League Player of the Year and was named to the Professional Footballers Australia (PFA) W-League Team of the Year. It was confirmed that Melbourne City re-signed Barnes for the 2018–2019 W-League and 2019/20 seasons.

==== 2016–2025 ====
Barnes won the NWSL Defender of the Year award for the 2016 season, marking the first time the award was not won by Becky Sauerbrunn. She was again a Defender of the Year finalist behind Sauerbrunn in the 2019 season.

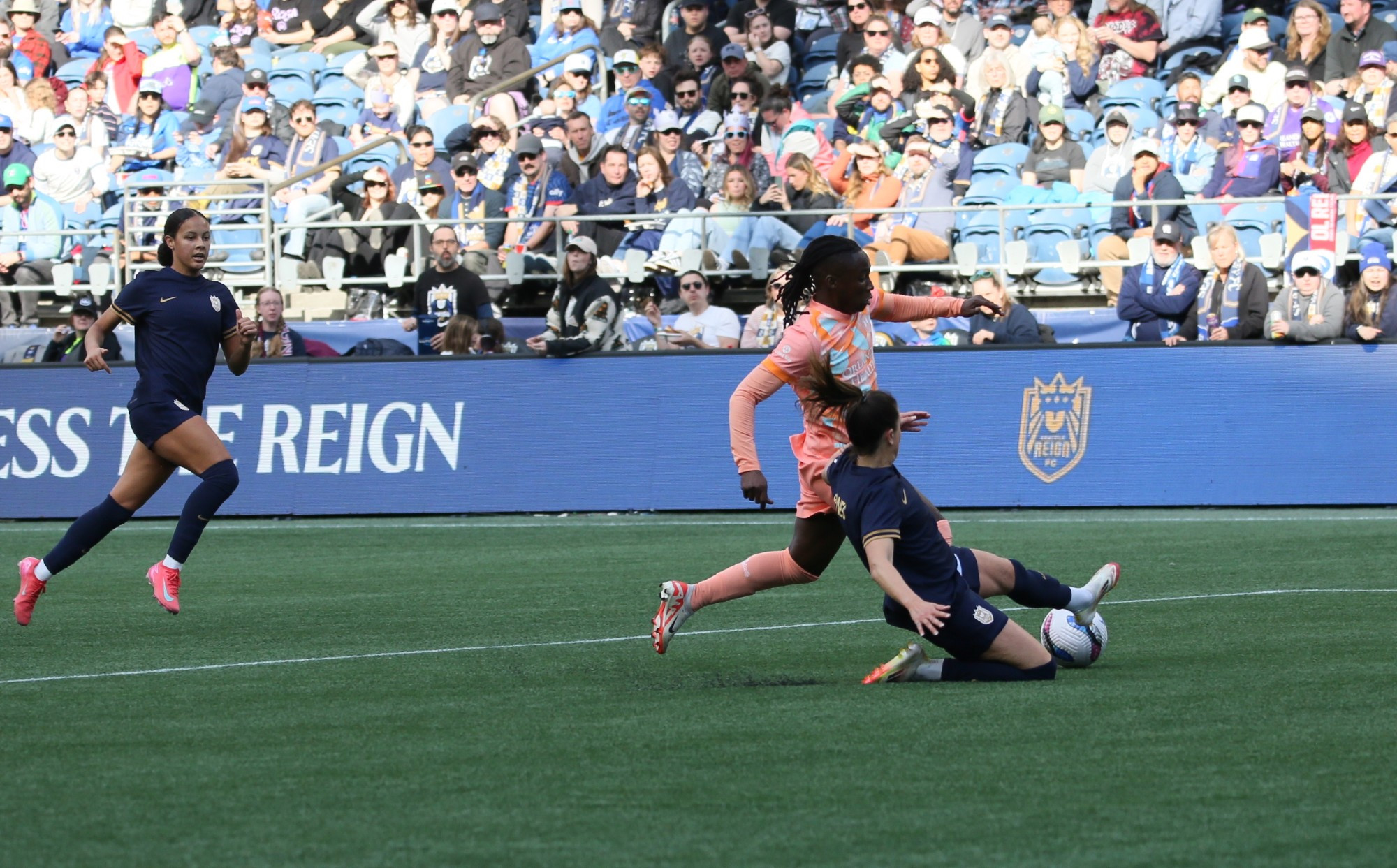
Barnes defends against Barbra Banda, April 2025

On May 15, 2021, Barnes became the second player in NWSL history to play in 150 regular season matches and the first to do so playing for a single club, the Reign. By the end of the 2023 season Barnes had appeared in more matches, started more matches, and played more minutes than any player in the 11-year history of the NWSL.

She has served as the captain for Seattle Reign FC since the 2022 season, and on January 10, 2023, she signed a two-year contract extension through the 2025 season. On October 10, 2025, Barnes made record-extending 250th regular-season NWSL appearance. Three days later, the Reign announced that Barnes would retire at the end of the 2025 season.

== International career ==
Barnes has represented the United States at the U-15, U-20, and U-23 levels. In 2010, she helped lead the U-23 team to the 2010 Four Nations Tournament title. In 2016, she received her first senior national team call-up for the 2016 SheBelieves Cup, but did not make an appearance.

== Coaching career ==
In 2012, she was an assistant coach for Division I team, UC Riverside. She has served as a trainer for Beast Mode Soccer along with former teammate Beverly Yanez.

In July 2026, Barnes returned to her longtime club Seattle Reign as an interim assistant coach under Laura Harvey for the rest of the season.

== Other work ==
Barnes has been an environmental advocate and spearheaded sustainability initiatives with Reign and the NWSL. In July 2024, she became a founding co-owner of USL W League team Salmon Bay FC. In July 2026, she played three matches for Salmon Bay during their run to the USL W League title.

== Honors ==
Philadelphia Independence

- WPS Championship runners-up: 2011

Seattle Reign FC

- NWSL Shield: 2014, 2015, 2022
- The Women's Cup: 2022
- NWSL Championship runners-up: 2014, 2015, 2023

Melbourne Victory

- W-League Championship: 2014

Melbourne City

- W-League Championship: 2017, 2018, 2020
- W-League Premiership: 2019–20

Salmon Bay

- USL W League: 2026

United States

- SheBelieves Cup: 2016

Individual

- NWSL Defender of the Year: 2016
- NWSL Best XI: 2015, 2016
- NWSL Second XI: 2014, 2019
- PFA W-League Team of the Year: 2017–18

== See also ==
- History of professional soccer in Seattle
- List of UCLA people
- United States at the 2007 Pan American Games
