= Katie Duncan =

New Zealand footballer (born 1988)

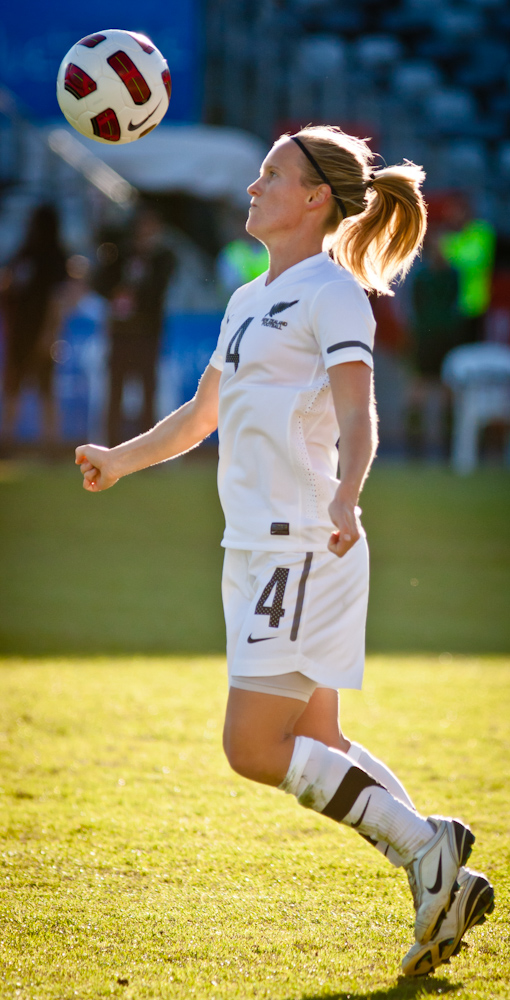
- Duncan in 2011

Personal information
- Full name: Katie Cherie Duncan
- Birth name: Katie Cherie Hoyle
- Date of birth: 1 February 1988 (age 38)
- Place of birth: Cambridge, New Zealand
- Height: 1.61 m (5 ft 3 in)
- Position: Defensive midfielder

Team information
- Current team: Onehunga Sports

Senior career*
Years	Team	Apps	(Gls)
- Claudelands Rovers
- Lynn-Avon United
- Glenfield Rovers
2011–2012	SC 07 Bad Neuenahr	16	(0)
- Eastern Suburbs AFC
2013–2014	Melbourne Victory	12	(0)
2014–2015	Notts County	10	(1)
2015–2016	FC Zürich	27	(2)
2016-	Onehunga Sports		

International career^{‡}
- New Zealand U20
2006–2019	New Zealand	125	(1)
- * Club domestic league appearances and goals as of 21 June 2015 ‡ National team caps and goals as of 20 June 2019

Katie Cherie Duncan (née Hoyle, 1 February 1988) is a New Zealand footballer who plays for Onehunga Sports and the New Zealand national team. Currently she is head coach at Eastern Suburbs AFC Premier Women's team in Auckland.

== Club career ==
Duncan signed for the Melbourne Victory ahead of the 2013–14 season.

In January 2014, Duncan agreed to join English side Notts County after the Australian season had concluded. In 2016 Duncan signed with FC Zurich before retiring for international football the year after.

== International career ==
Duncan represented New Zealand at age group level, appearing at the 2006 Women's U-20 World Cup finals, and again represented the young Ferns at the 2008 Women's U-20 World Cup in Chile. before making her full Football Ferns debut in a 0–3 loss to China on 14 November 2006, and represented New Zealand at the 2007 FIFA Women's World Cup finals in China, where they lost to Brazil 0–5, Denmark (0–2) and China (0–2).

Duncan was also included in the New Zealand squad for the 2008 Summer Olympics where they drew with Japan (2–2) before losing to Norway(0–1) and Brazil (0–4).

She scored her first senior international goal in a 10–0 win over Cook Islands at the Oceania Women's Nations Cup on 1 October 2010.

Duncan played for New Zealand at the 2011 FIFA Women's World Cup where she earned her 50th cap in a 2–1 loss to England in the group stages.

She was part of New Zealand's 2012 Olympic squad and 2016 Olympic Squad. She also featured in all New Zealand's three matches at the 2015 FIFA Women's World Cup in Canada. Duncan first retired in 2017, but then came out of retirement to attend her fourth FIFA Women's World Cup in 2019 in France. On October 11, 2019, Duncan announced her retirement from international soccer.

== Personal life ==
Duncan is married to fellow New Zealand footballer Priscilla Duncan, where they have two children, born 2019 and 2021. She has a Bachelor of Physical Education from the University of Auckland.

== Honours ==
Individual

- IFFHS OFC Woman Team of the Decade 2011–2020
