= List of Perth Glory FC (women) players =

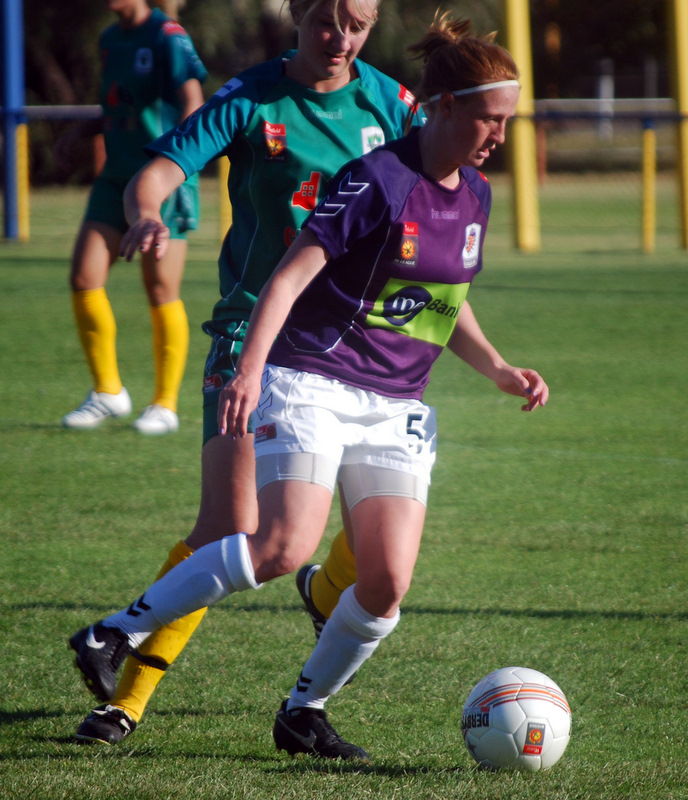
Shannon May holds the games record for Perth Glory in women's soccer

Perth Glory FC has entered a women's soccer team in the Australian A-League Women competition since the league's founding as the W-League in 2008. As of January 2022, Shannon May, with 120 appearances, has played the most league matches for Perth Glory. In 2018, she became the first Glory player to reach 100 matches.

== List ==
Table of players, including nationalities, positions and appearance details
Player	Nationality	Position	Club career	Starts	Subs	Total	Goals	Ref
Player	Nationality	Position	Club career	Appearances			Goals	Ref
Dani Calautti	Australia	U	2008–2012	23	5	28	0	
Ciara Conway	Australia	FW	2008–2009	6	3	9	0	
Carys Hawkins	Wales	DF	2008–2014	51	11	62	1	
Stacey Learmont	Australia	DF	2008–2011	11	5	16	0	
Ella Mastrantonio	Australia	MF	2008–2016	38	17	55	0	
Collette McCallum	Australia	MF	2008–2014	51	2	53	11	
Tanya Oxtoby	Australia	DF	2008–2012	40	0	40	0	
Elle Semmens	Australia	DF	2008	3	0	3	0	
Rachael Smith	Australia	DF	2008	2	1	3	0	
Kate Stewart	Australia	GK	2008	2	0	2	0	
Marianna Tabain	Australia	U	2008–2018	73	15	88	20	
Sam Kerr	Australia	U	2008–2011; 2014–2019	68	3	71	57	
Elisa D'Ovidio	Australia	MF	2008–2014	64	12	76	12	
Lim Shiya	Singapore	MF	2008	1	0	1	0	
Shannon May	Australia	MF	2008–	98	22	120	3	
Katarina Jukic	Australia	U	2008–2012; 2019–2021	19	17	36	3	
Lisa De Vanna	Australia	FW	2008–2009; 2012–2013; 2021–	20	6	26	10	
Maya Diedrichsen	Australia	GK	2008	3	0	3	0	
Emily Dunn	Australia	DF	2008–2012	9	1	10	0	
Katy Coghlan	England	MF	2008	0	4	4	0	
Luisa Marzotto	Australia	GK	2008	5	0	5	0	
Elissia Canham	Australia	DF	2009	1	2	3	0	
Sadie Lawrence	Australia	DF	2009–2012	12	5	17	0	
Emma Wirkus	Australia	GK	2009	10	0	10	0	
Ellis Glanfield	Australia	FW	2009	1	4	5	0	
Alex Singer	USA	DF	2009–2011	19	0	19	1	
Jaymee Gibbons	Australia	MF	2009–2018	15	22	37	1	
Kate Gill	Australia	FW	2009–2014	48	0	48	36	
Tine Cederkvist	Denmark	GK	2010–2011	10	0	10	0	
Alexandra Nilsson	Sweden	DF	2010–2011	10	0	10	0	
Lara Filocamo	Australia	U	2010–2012	4	6	10	0	

== B ==
- Carla Bennett
- Nicola Bolger
- Danielle Brogan

== C ==
- Kim Carroll
- Sarah Carroll
- Ciara Conway
- Katy Coghlan

== D ==
- Gabrielle Dal Busco
- Lisa De Vanna
- Vanessa DiBernardo
- Maya Diederichsen
- Jessica Dillon
- Elisa D'Ovidio
- Emily J Dunn

== F ==
- Caitlin Foord
- Amanda Frisbie

== G ==
- Kate Gill

== H ==
- Carys Hawkins
- Emily Henderson
- Rachel Hill
- Katie Holtham

== J ==
- Chantel Jones
- Katarina Jukic
- Christina Julien

== K ==
- Alanna Kennedy
- Sam Kerr
- Amy Knights

== L ==
- Stacey Learmont
- Shiya Lim
- Aivi Luik

== M ==
- Shannon May
- Melissa Maizels
- Ella Mastrantonio
- Alyssa Mautz
- Collette McCallum
- Luisa Marzotto
- Elizabeth Milne

== O ==
- Tanya Oxtoby

== P ==
- Zoe Palandri

== R ==
- Raquel Rodríguez
- Arianna Romero

== S ==
- Cecilie Sandvej
- Elle Semmens
- Alex Singer
- Rachael Smith
- Nikki Stanton
- Rosie Sutton

== T ==
- Marianna Tabain

== W ==
- Emma Wirkus

== Z ==
- Shelina Zadorsky
