= 2011–12 W-League =

Fourth season of the top women's football (soccer) league in Australia

- League: W-League
- Sport: Women's association football
- Duration: 2011–2012
- Teams: 7
- TV partner: ABC1

W-League season
- Champions: Canberra United
- Premiers: Canberra United
- Top scorer: Michelle Heyman (15)

W-League seasons
- ← 2010–11 2012–13 →

The 2011–12 W-League season was the fourth season of the W-League, the Australian national women's football (soccer) competition. The season consisted of twelve rounds, giving each team a total of ten games, followed by a finals series.

== Clubs ==
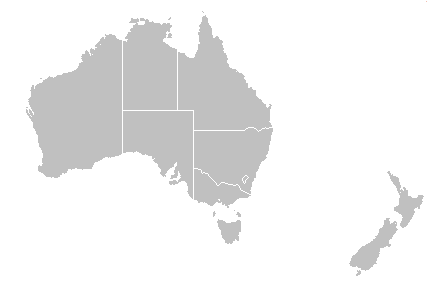

W-League teams for the 2011–12 season:

Team	City	Years in competition
Adelaide United	(South Australia) Adelaide, SA	2008–09 — present
Brisbane Roar	(Queensland) Brisbane, Qld	2008–09 — present
Canberra United	(Australian Capital Territory) Canberra, ACT	2008–09 — present
Melbourne Victory	(Victoria (state)) Melbourne, Vic	2008–09 — present
Newcastle Jets	(New South Wales) Newcastle, NSW	2008–09 — present
Perth Glory	(Western Australia) Perth, WA	2008–09 — present
Sydney FC	(New South Wales) Sydney, NSW	2008–09 — present

=== Personnel and kits ===
Team	Manager	Captain	Kit manufacturer
Adelaide United	(England) David Edmondson	(New Zealand) Abby Erceg	Erreà
Brisbane Roar	(Wales) Jeff Hopkins	(Australia) Clare Polkinghorne	Puma
Canberra United	(Czech Republic) Jitka Klimkova	(Australia) Ellie Brush	Hummel
Melbourne Victory	(Australia) Vicki Linton	(England) Jodie Taylor	Adidas
Newcastle Jets	(Australia) Clayton Zane	(Germany) Ariane Hingst	ISC
Perth Glory	(Australia) Jamie Harnwell	(Australia) Tanya Oxtoby	Kelme
Sydney FC	(Australia) Alen Stajcic	(Australia) Heather Garriock	Adidas

=== Foreign players ===
Club	Visa 1	Visa 2	Visa 3	Non-Visa foreigner(s)	Former player(s)
Adelaide United	(New Zealand) Abby Erceg	(New Zealand) Anna Green	(United States) Ashleigh Gunning		
Brisbane Roar	(Japan) Hoshimi Kishi	(Spain) Olga Cebrián García			
Canberra United	(New Zealand) Aroon Clansey	(United States) Taryn Hemmings		(New Zealand) Emma Kete^{R}	
Melbourne Victory	(England) Jodie Taylor	(United States) Kendall Fletcher	(United States) Danielle Johnson	(Turkey) Gülcan Koca^{A}	
Newcastle Jets	(Germany) Ariane Hingst			(England) Stacey Day^{B}	
Perth Glory	(England) Katie Holtham	(Norway) Lisa-Marie Woods		(Wales) Carys Hawkins^{A}	(New Zealand) Emma Kete
Sydney FC	(Cameroon) Estelle Johnson	(United States) Alli Lipsher			(United States) Megan Rapinoe^{G}

The following do not fill a Visa position:
^{A} Australian citizens who have chosen to represent another national team;
^{B} Those players who were born and started their professional career abroad but have since gained Australian citizenship;
^{G} Guest players;
^{R} Injury replacement players, or national team replacement players;

== Regular season ==
=== League table ===
Pos	Team	Pld	W	D	L	GF	GA	GD	Pts	Qualification
1	Canberra United (C)	10	7	3	0	23	9	+14	24	Qualification to Finals series
2	Brisbane Roar	10	6	3	1	20	11	+9	21	Qualification to Finals series
3	Sydney FC	10	5	2	3	26	8	+18	17	Qualification to Finals series
4	Melbourne Victory	10	5	2	3	21	9	+12	17	Qualification to Finals series
5	Newcastle Jets	10	4	0	6	18	22	−4	12	
6	Perth Glory	10	2	0	8	11	36	−25	6	
7	Adelaide United	10	1	0	9	6	30	−24	3	

Source: au.soccerway.com
Rules for classification: 1) points; 2) goal difference; 3) number of goals scored.
(C) Champions

=== Regular season ===
==== Round 1 ====
22 October 2011	Adelaide United	1–4	Canberra United	Hindmarsh Stadium, Adelaide
	Quigley 28'	report	Heyman 2', 82'; Munoz 62', 72'	Attendance: 600

22 October 2011	Sydney FC	1–1	Brisbane Roar	Leichhardt Oval, Leichhardt
	Rollason 26'	report	Burgess 51'	Attendance: 1,200

22 October 2011	Melbourne Victory	2–0	Perth Glory	Veneto Club, Bulleen
	Friend 38'; Jackson 48'	report		Attendance: 300

==== Round 2 ====
29 October 2011	Newcastle Jets	3–0	Adelaide United	Adamstown Oval, Newcastle
	O'Neill 5'; De Vanna 47', 68'	report		Attendance: 847; Referee: Casey Reibelt

29 October 2011	Sydney FC	2–1	Melbourne Victory	Leichhardt Oval, Leichhardt
	Ledbrook 9'; Rapinoe 83'	report	Taylor 63' (pen.)	Referee: Jacqui Melksham

29 October 2011	Canberra United	3–2	Perth Glory	McKellar Park, Canberra
	Heyman 64', 66', 80'	report	Kete 21'; Tabain 89'	Referee: Kate Jacewicz

==== Round 3 ====
5 November 2011	Perth Glory	2–1	Adelaide United	NIB Stadium, Perth
	Elze 6'; Jukic 37'	report	Quigley 2'	Referee: Casey Reibelt

5 November 2011	Sydney FC	0–1	Canberra United	Leichhardt Oval, Leichhardt
		report	A. Sykes 18'	Referee: Kirralee Gardner

5 November 2011	Brisbane Roar	2–3	Newcastle Jets	Cleveland Showgrounds, Cleveland
	Alleway 18'; Gielnik 55'	report	Andrews 24'; De Vanna 72' (pen.), 83' (pen.)	Referee: Kate Jacewicz

==== Round 4 ====
12 November 2011	Newcastle Jets	1–4	Sydney FC	Adamstown Oval, Newcastle
	Andrews 86'	report	Walsh 46'; Slatyer 57'; Foord 64'; Garriock 76'	Attendance: 985; Referee: Casey Reibelt

12 November 2011	Canberra United	2–1	Melbourne Victory	McKellar Park, Canberra
	A. Sykes 24'; Hemmings 39'	report	Fletcher 78'	Attendance: 732; Referee: Kate Jacewicz

12 November 2011	Adelaide United	1–2	Brisbane Roar	Burton Park, Adelaide
	Rajcic 76'	report	Polkinghorne 38'; Spina 63'

==== Round 5 ====
19 November 2011	Canberra United	3–1	Newcastle Jets	McKellar Park, Canberra
	Shipard 29'; Heyman 64', 80'	report	Simon 77'	Attendance: 887; Referee: Kiralee Gardner

19 November 2011	Perth Glory	2–5	Brisbane Roar	6PR Stadium, Perth
	Kete 24'; Tabain 79'	report	Butt 6', 43', 75'; Gielnik 59'; Polkinghorne 71'	Referee: Trent Fleskins

19 November 2011	Melbourne Victory	4–0	Adelaide United	Veneto Club, Bulleen
	Friend 16', 56', 80'; Taylor 23'	report		Attendance: 556; Referee: Catherine Hoffman

==== Round 6 ====
21 December 2011 (Note: match postponed due to inclement weather)	Newcastle Jets	3–1	Perth Glory	Adamstown Oval, Newcastle
	Andrews 22'; Bolger 55'; Van Egmond 60'	report	Holtham 78'

26 November 2011	Adelaide United	1–4	Sydney FC	Hindmarsh Stadium, Adelaide
	Rajcic 30'	report	Garriock 38'; Uzunlar 42'; Khamis 76'; Foord 78'

26 November 2011	Brisbane Roar	1–0	Melbourne Victory	Suncorp Stadium, Brisbane
	Gielnik 47'	report

==== Round 7 ====
3 December 2011	Melbourne Victory	2–1	Newcastle Jets	Skilled Stadium, Geelong
	Taylor 41', 65'	report	Bolger 37'

3 December 2011	Brisbane Roar	2–2	Canberra United	Cleveland Showgrounds, Cleveland
	Burgess 7'; Brush 88' (o.g.)	report	Shipard 9' (pen.); Heyman 78'

3 December 2011	Sydney FC	11–0	Perth Glory	Leichhardt Oval, Leichhardt
	Rollason 24', 42', 50'; Ledbrook 47', 78', 87'; Oxtoby 58' (o.g.); Khamis 59', 60', 75'; Simon 90+3'	report

==== Round 8 ====
10 December 2011	Brisbane Roar	2–0	Adelaide United	Stockland Park, Sunshine Coast
	Luik 6'; Gielnik 90'	report

10 December 2011	Canberra United	0–0	Sydney FC	Deakin Stadium, Canberra
		report

10 December 2011	Perth Glory	0–5	Melbourne Victory	6PR Stadium, Perth
		report	Gorry 3', 23'; Taylor 24', 62', 78'

==== Round 9 ====
17 December 2011	Adelaide United	1–0	Perth Glory	Burton Park, Adelaide
	Ebbs 34'	report

17 December 2011	Melbourne Victory	1–1	Brisbane Roar	Simonds Stadium, Geelong
	Fletcher 78'	report	Gielnik 90'

18 December 2011	Newcastle Jets	1–2	Canberra United	Adamstown Oval, Newcastle
	Dobson 86'	report	Hemmings 63'; Heyman 74'

==== Round 10 ====
30 December 2011	Melbourne Victory	1–1	Canberra United	Veneto Club, Bulleen
	Taylor 20' (pen.)	report	Heyman 81'	Attendance: 601; Referee: Catherine Hoffman

31 December 2011	Sydney FC	1–2	Newcastle Jets	Campbelltown Stadium, Campbelltown
	Rollason 69'	report	Simon 10'; Bolger 37'	Referee: Kirralee Gardner

==== Round 11 ====
7 January 2012	Canberra United	5–0	Adelaide United	McKellar Park, Canberra
	Heyman 28', 34'; Hemmings 83', 85'; A. Sykes 92'	report		Referee: Rebecca Durcau

7 January 2012	Newcastle Jets	1–3	Brisbane Roar	Adamstown Oval, Newcastle
	O'Neill 53'	report	Harch 29'; Gielnik 69', 90'	Attendance: 822; Referee: Katie Patterson

7 January 2012	Perth Glory	0–3	Sydney FC	6PR Stadium, Perth
		report	Oxtoby 6' (o.g.); Simon 22', 45'	Referee: David Costello

==== Round 12 ====
14 January 2012	Brisbane Roar	1–0	Sydney FC	QSAC, Brisbane
	Polias 32' (o.g.)	report		Referee: Kirralee Gardener

14 January 2012	Perth Glory	4–2	Newcastle Jets	6PR Stadium, Perth
	Jukic 9'; Hawkins 63'; D'Ovidio 72'; Tabain 82'	report	De Vanna 76'; Kennedy 90'	Referee: Matthew Souther

15 January 2012	Adelaide United	1–4	Melbourne Victory	Burton Park, Adelaide
	Rajcic 21'	report	Gorry 31'; Brown 36'; Friend 45'; Fletcher 90'	Referee: Stacey Sasopoulos

== Finals series ==
=== Semi-finals ===
21 January 2012	Canberra United	1–0	Melbourne Victory	McKellar Park, Canberra
	Heyman 83'	report		Attendance: 1,825; Referee: Kirralee Gardener

22 January 2012	Brisbane Roar	1–1 (a.e.t.) (4–3 p)	Sydney FC	QSAC, Brisbane
	Gielnik 90+4'	report	Rollason 18'	Attendance: 1,648; Referee: Casey Reibelt
	Penalties
	Carroll (penalty scored); Butt (penalty scored); Spence (penalty scored); Cebrian Garcia (penalty missed); Luik (penalty scored)		(penalty scored) Slatyer; (penalty missed) Johnson; (penalty scored) Brogan; (penalty missed) Polias; (penalty scored) Whitfield

=== Final ===
28 January 2012	Canberra United	3–2	Brisbane Roar	McKellar Park, Canberra
	Heyman 11', 55'; A. Skyes 18'	report	Gielnik 23'; Butt 66' (pen.)	Attendance: 2,512; Referee: Kate Jacewicz

== Regular season statistics ==
=== Leading goalscorers ===
Total	Player		Team	Goals per Round													
Total	Player		Team	1	2	3	4	5	6	7	8	9	10	11	12	SF	F
15	(Australia)	Michelle Heyman	Canberra United	2	3			2		1		1	1	2		1	2
9	(Australia)	Emily Gielnik	Brisbane Roar			1		1	1		1	1		2		1	1
8	(England)	Jodie Taylor	Melbourne Victory		1			1		2	3		1				
6	(Australia)	Renee Rollason	Sydney FC	1						3			1			1	
5	(Australia)	Lisa De Vanna	Newcastle Jets		2	2									1		
5	(Australia)	Caitlin Friend	Melbourne Victory	1				3							1		
4	(Australia)	Tameka Butt	Brisbane Roar					3									1
4	(United States)	Taryn Hemmings	Canberra United				1					1		2			
4	(Australia)	Leena Khamis	Sydney FC						1	3							
4	(Australia)	Kylie Ledbrook	Sydney FC		1					3							
4	(Australia)	Ashleigh Sykes	Canberra United			1	1							1			1

Goal scored from penalty kick Two goals scored from penalty kick

=== Own goals ===
Player		Club	Against	Round
(Australia)	Sian McLaren	Adelaide United	Sydney FC	6
(Australia)	Ellie Brush	Canberra United	Brisbane Roar	7
(Australia)	Tanya Oxtoby	Perth Glory	Sydney FC	7
(Australia)	Tanya Oxtoby	Perth Glory	Sydney FC	11
(Australia)	Teresa Polias	Sydney FC	Brisbane Roar	12

== See also ==
- 2011–12 Adelaide United W-League season
- 2011–12 Brisbane Roar W-League season
- 2011–12 Melbourne Victory W-League season
