= 2010–11 Perth Glory FC (women) season =

Perth Glory (W-League)
2010–11 season
- Chairman: Tony Sage
- Head Coach: John Gibson
- Stadium: 6PR Stadium
- W-League: 5th
- W-League Finals: DNQ
- Top goalscorer: Kate Gill; Sam Kerr (3 each)
- Biggest win: 4–0 vs. Adelaide United (H) (13 November 2010); W-League
- Biggest defeat: 1–5 vs. Sydney FC (H) (9 January 2011); W-League
Home colours	Away colours

The 2010–11 season was Perth Glory Football Club (W-League)'s third season, in the W-League. Perth Glory finished 5th in their W-League season.

== Players ==
Note: Flags indicate national team as defined under FIFA eligibility rules; some limited exceptions apply. Players may hold more than one non-FIFA nationality.

No.	Pos.	Nation	Player
1	GK	DEN	Tine Cederkvist
2	MF	AUS	Stacey Learmont
3	DF	WAL	Carys Hawkins
4	FW	AUS	Sam Kerr
5	MF	AUS	Shannon May
6	DF	USA	Alex Singer
7	MF	SWE	Alexandra Nilsson
8	DF	AUS	Tanya Oxtoby
9	MF	AUS	Monnique Kofoed
11	FW	AUS	Lara Filocamo

No.	Pos.	Nation	Player
12	FW	AUS	Kate Gill
13	MF	AUS	Elisa D'Ovidio
14	MF	AUS	Collette McCallum
15	MF	AUS	Jaymee Gibbons
16	DF	AUS	Sadie Lawrence
17	FW	AUS	Marianna Tabain
18	FW	AUS	Ashleigh Panaia
19	DF	AUS	Emily Dunn
20	GK	AUS	Kathleen Waycott

== Transfers ==
=== Transfers in ===
No.	Position	Name	From	Type/fee	Date	Ref.
1	GK	(Denmark) Tine Cederkvist	(Sweden) Malmö	Free transfer	29 October 2010	
2	MF	Stacey Learmont	Free agent	Free transfer	29 October 2010	
7	MF	Alexandra Nilsson	(Sweden) Sunnanå	Free transfer	29 October 2010	
11	FW	Lara Filocamo	(Australia) Northern Redbacks	Free transfer	29 October 2010	
12	FW	Kate Gill	(Sweden) Malmö	Free transfer	29 October 2010	
15	MF	Jaymee Gibbons	(Australia) Football West High Performance Unit	Free transfer	29 October 2010	
19	DF	Emily Dunn	(Australia) Northern Redbacks	Free transfer	29 October 2010	
20	GK	Kathleen Waycott	(Australia) Bunbury Forum Force	Free transfer	29 October 2010	

=== Transfers out ===
No.	Position	Name	To	Type/fee	Date	Ref.
1	GK	Emma Wirkus	Free agent	Free transfer	29 October 2010	
6	MF	Ella Mastrantonio	Melbourne Victory	Free transfer	29 October 2010	
7	DF	Elissia Canham	Free agent	Free transfer	29 October 2010	
10	FW	Ciara Conway	Free agent	Free transfer	29 October 2010	
11	FW	Lisa De Vanna	(United States) Washington Freedom	Free transfer	29 October 2010	
18	FW	Ellis Glanfield	Free agent	Free transfer	29 October 2010	
19	MF	Katarina Jukic	Free agent	Free transfer	29 October 2010	
20	GK	Zoe Palandri	Free agent	Free transfer	29 October 2010	

== Competitions ==
=== Overall record ===
Competition	First match	Last match	Starting round	Final position	Record							
Competition	First match	Last match	Starting round	Final position	Pld	W	D	L	GF	GA	GD	Win %
W-League	7 November 2010	29 January 2011	Matchday 1	5th	10	4	1	5	11	15	−4	40.00
Total					10	4	1	5	11	15	−4	40.00

Source: Competitions

=== W-League ===
==== League table ====
Pos	Team	Pld	W	D	L	GF	GA	GD	Pts	Qualification
1	Sydney FC	10	8	0	2	29	9	+20	24	Qualification to Finals series
2	Brisbane Roar (C)	10	6	3	1	17	7	+10	21	Qualification to Finals series
3	Canberra United	10	5	2	3	16	9	+7	17	Qualification to Finals series
4	Melbourne Victory	10	4	3	3	12	11	+1	15	Qualification to Finals series
5	Perth Glory	10	4	1	5	11	15	−4	13	
6	Newcastle Jets	10	3	1	6	13	15	−2	10	
7	Adelaide United	10	0	0	10	4	36	−32	0	

Source: au.soccerway.com
Rules for classification: 1) points; 2) goal difference; 3) number of goals scored.
(C) Champions

==== Results summary ====
Overall								Home						Away					
Pld	W	D	L	GF	GA	GD	Pts	W	D	L	GF	GA	GD	W	D	L	GF	GA	GD
10	4	1	5	11	15	−4	13	2	1	2	8	10	−2	2	0	3	3	5	−2

Source: worldfootball.net

==== Results by round ====
Round	1	2	3	4	5	6	7	8	9	10	11	12
Ground	H	H	B	A	H	A	A	B	H	A	H	A
Result	L	W	B	L	W	L	W	B	L	W	D	L
Position	7	4	4	6	4	4	4	4	6	4	4	5
Points	0	3	3	3	6	6	9	9	9	12	13	13

Source: worldfootball.net
A = Away; H = Home; W = Win; D = Draw; L = Loss

==== Matches ====
The league fixtures were announced on 20 August 2010.

Win Draw Loss

7 November 2010 1	Perth Glory	1–4	Canberra United	Perth
15:00 AWST	Gill 41'	Report	Heyman 34', 70', 87'; Maciejewski 57'	Stadium: 6PR Stadium; Referee: Catherine Hoffman

13 November 2010 2	Perth Glory	4–0	Adelaide United	Perth
12:00 AWST	Gill 27' (pen.), 32' (pen.); May 36'; Kerr 80'	Report		Stadium: nib Stadium; Referee: Kate Jacewicz

27 November 2010 4	Brisbane Roar	1–0	Perth Glory	Brisbane
16:00 AEST	De Vanna 90+3'	Report		Stadium: Perry Park; Referee: Jacqui Melksman

5 December 2010 5	Perth Glory	1–0	Newcastle Jets	Perth
17:00 AWST	Gibbons 4'	Report		Stadium: 6PR Stadium; Referee: Stacey Sasopolous

11 December 2010 6	Sydney FC	2–0	Perth Glory	Wollongong
15:00 AEDT	Khamis 55'; Simon 71'	Report		Stadium: WIN Stadium; Attendance: 246; Referee: Sachiko Yamagashi

18 December 2010 7	Melbourne Victory	0–1	Perth Glory	Melbourne
16:15 AEDT		Report	Kofoed 82'	Stadium: AAMI Park; Referee: Catherine Hofmann

9 January 2011 9	Perth Glory	1–5	Sydney FC	Perth
17:00 AWST	McCallum 69'	Report	Khamis 3', 8'; Simon 47', 74', 90+1'	Stadium: 6PR Stadium; Referee: Kate Jacewicz

15 January 2011 10	Adelaide United	1–2	Perth Glory	Adelaide
14:30 ACDT	Gorry 73'	Report	Kerr 16', 42'	Stadium: Hindmarsh Stadium; Referee: Catherine Hoffman

23 January 2011 11	Perth Glory	1–1	Melbourne Victory	Perth
17:00 AWST	D'Ovidio 39'	Report	Catley 47'	Stadium: 6PR Stadium; Referee: Kirralee Gardener

29 January 2011 12	Canberra United	1–0	Perth Glory	Canberra
15:00 AEDT	Sykes 88'	Report		Stadium: McKellar Park; Attendance: 797; Referee: Kirralee Andruschak

== Statistics ==
=== Appearances and goals ===
Includes all competitions. Players with no appearances not included in the list.

No.	Pos.	Nat.	Name	W-League		Total	
No.	Pos.	Nat.	Name	Apps	Goals	Apps	Goals
1	GK	(Denmark)	Tine Cederkvist	10	0	10	0
2	MF	(Australia)	Stacey Learmont	1+5	0	6	0
3	DF	(Wales)	Carys Hawkins	10	1	10	1
4	FW	(Australia)	Sam Kerr	10	3	10	3
5	MF	(Australia)	Shannon May	10	1	10	1
6	DF	(United States)	Alex Singer	10	0	10	0
7	MF	(Sweden)	Alexandra Nilsson	10	0	10	0
8	DF	(Australia)	Tanya Oxtoby	10	0	10	0
9	MF	(Australia)	Monique Kofoed	0+5	1	5	1
11	FW	(Australia)	Lara Filocamo	0+2	0	2	0
12	FW	(Australia)	Kate Gill	10	3	10	3
13	MF	(Australia)	Elisa D'Ovidio	10	1	10	1
14	MF	(Australia)	Collette McCallum	9	1	9	1
15	MF	(Australia)	Jaymee Gibbons	9+1	1	10	1
16	DF	(Australia)	Sadie Lawrence	0+1	0	1	0
17	FW	(Australia)	Maianna Tabain	1+9	0	10	0

=== Disciplinary record ===
Includes all competitions. The list is sorted by squad number when total cards are equal. Players with no cards not included in the list.

Rank	No.	Pos.	Nat.	Name	W-League			Total		
Rank	No.	Pos.	Nat.	Name	Booked	(yellow card) (yellow-red card)	Sent off (straight red)	Booked	(yellow card) (yellow-red card)	Sent off (straight red)
1	14	MF	(Australia)	Collette McCallum	3	0	0	3	0	0
2	12	FW	(Australia)	Kate Gill	2	0	0	2	0	0
2	13	MF	(Australia)	Elisa D'Ovidio	2	0	0	2	0	0
4	3	DF	(Wales)	Carys Hawkins	1	0	0	1	0	0
4	4	FW	(Australia)	Sam Kerr	1	0	0	1	0	0
Total					9	0	0	9	0	0

=== Clean sheets ===
Includes all competitions. The list is sorted by squad number when total clean sheets are equal. Numbers in parentheses represent games where both goalkeepers participated and both kept a clean sheet; the number in parentheses is awarded to the goalkeeper who was substituted on, whilst a full clean sheet is awarded to the goalkeeper who was on the field at the start of play. Goalkeepers with no clean sheets not included in the list.

Rank	No.	Nat.	Goalkeeper	W-League	Total
1	1	(Denmark)	Tine Cederkvist	3	3
