= 2011–12 Melbourne Victory FC (women) season =

Melbourne Victory (W-League)
2011–12 season
- Chairman: Anthony Di Pietro
- Head Coach: Vicki Linton
- Stadiums: Veneto Club; Skilled Stadium
- W-League: 4th
- W-League Finals: Semi-finals
- Top goalscorer: League: Jodie Taylor (8); All: Jodie Taylor (8)
- Biggest win: 5–0 vs. Perth Glory (A) (10 December 2011); W-League
- Biggest defeat: 1–2 (twice); 0–1 (twice)
Home colours	Away colours

The 2011–12 season was Melbourne Victory Football Club (W-League)'s fourth season, in the W-League. Melbourne Victory finished 4th in their W-League season, finishing in the semi-finals.

== Review ==
=== Background ===
The Victory entered the 2011–12 season having finished fourth in 2010–11 and being eliminated in the semi-finals in their first finals appearance.

Vicki Linton returned for a second year as head coach, the only female coach in the W-League.

=== Regular season ===
Victory opened the season with a 2–0 victory over Perth Glory at the Veneto Club with Caitlin Friend and Amy Jackson scoring either side of half-time.

Playing against Sydney FC in their second match, the Victory lost a tight battle 2–1 with Sydney's guest player Megan Rapinoe scoring a winner late in the match.

Travelling to Canberra, Victory faced Canberra United at McKellar Park. Victory conceded two goals in the first half and Kendall Fletcher could only score a consolation goal with twelve minutes to play.

Returning to Victoria, the team faced winless Adelaide United at Veneto Club. Victory prevailed 4–0, with Caitlin Friend scoring three times.

In their sixth match of the season, Victory played Newcastle Jets in Geelong, marking Melissa Barbieri's return to Victoria. The Victory used her return to market the match and tried, unsuccessfully, to attract a W-League record crowd. Before the match, Barbieri complained, saying, "they are billing me, in front of their own players, to market the game and I think that's poor form." Ultimately, the Victory prevailed 2–1, with Jodie Taylor scoring two goals for the home team.

Playing in Perth a week later, Victory faced a Perth Glory team who had been defeated 11–0 by Sydney FC the previous week. The Glory were also missing two players who had been suspended after a fight at training. Victory recorded their biggest win of the season in a 5–0 defeat with Katrina Gorry scoring a brace and Jodie Taylor a hat-trick.

Facing the undefeated Canberra United in late December, the Victory led early with Taylor converting a 20th minute penalty after Fletcher was brought down in the penalty area. Michelle Heyman equalised for Canberra in the 81st minute and the final score remained 1–1.

Entering their final match of the season against Adelaide United at Burton Park in Adelaide, the Victory were guaranteed of making the finals, with the Newcastle Jets losing to Perth Glory the day before. Had the Jets won, the Victory would have needed a point to lock in fourth spot. The Victory won comfortably with four players sharing in the goals in a 4–1 win over the Reds.

== Transfers ==
In September, Linton made the decision to release national team goalkeeper Melissa Barbieri ahead of the season in favour of 16-year-old Brianna Davey.

England international Jodie Taylor returned to the club from Birmingham City in the FA Women's Super League (WSL). American players, Kendall Fletcher and Danielle Johnson from Sky Blue FC in Women's Professional Soccer (WPS) returned for a second season.

In October 2011, the Victory recruited Laura Spiranovic, sister of Australian men's international Matthew Spiranovic, from South Melbourne. Spiranovic had come off a big season in the Victorian Women's Premier League having won both the best player award as well as being the league's leading goalscorer.

Linton also brought in local players, Jackie Vogt, Cassandra Dimovski and Georgie Koutrouvelis.

=== In ===
Pos.	Name	From	Ref.
FW	(England) Jodie Taylor	(England) Birmingham City	
DF	(United States) Kendall Fletcher	(United States) Sky Blue FC	
DF	(United States) Danielle Johnson	(United States) Sky Blue FC	
FW	(Australia) Laura Spiranovic	(Australia) South Melbourne FC	
DF	(New Zealand) Rebekah Stott	(Australia) Brisbane Roar	
MF	(Australia) Katrina Gorry	(Australia) Adelaide United	
MF	(Australia) Stephanie Tanti	(Australia) Sandringham	
DF	(Australia) Jackie Vogt	(Australia) NTC	
GK	(Australia) Cassandra Dimovski	(Australia) Box Hill	
FW	(Australia) Georgie Koutrouvelis	(Australia) Box Hill	

=== Out ===
Pos.	Name	To	Ref.
GK	(Australia) Melissa Barbieri	(Australia) Newcastle Jets	
DF	(Australia) Snez Veljanovska	(Australia) Canberra United	
DF	(Australia) Ella Mastrantonio	(Australia) Perth Glory	
MF	(Australia) Ursula Hughson	Released	
FW	(Australia) Deanna Niceski	Released	
DF	(New Zealand) Marlies Oostdam	Released	
MF	(Australia) Nicole Paul	Released	

== Competitions ==
=== Overall record ===
Competition	First match	Last match	Starting round	Final position	Record							
Competition	First match	Last match	Starting round	Final position	Pld	W	D	L	GF	GA	GD	Win %
W-League	22 October 2011	15 January 2012	Matchday 1	4th	10	5	2	3	21	9	+12	50.00
W-League Finals	21 January 2012		Semi-finals	Semi-finals	1	0	0	1	0	1	−1	0.00
Total					11	5	2	4	21	10	+11	45.45

Source: Competitions

=== W-League ===
==== League table ====
Pos	Team	Pld	W	D	L	GF	GA	GD	Pts	Qualification
1	Canberra United (C)	10	7	3	0	23	9	+14	24	Qualification to Finals series
2	Brisbane Roar	10	6	3	1	20	11	+9	21	Qualification to Finals series
3	Sydney FC	10	5	2	3	26	8	+18	17	Qualification to Finals series
4	Melbourne Victory	10	5	2	3	21	9	+12	17	Qualification to Finals series
5	Newcastle Jets	10	4	0	6	18	22	−4	12	
6	Perth Glory	10	2	0	8	11	36	−25	6	
7	Adelaide United	10	1	0	9	6	30	−24	3	

Source: au.soccerway.com
Rules for classification: 1) points; 2) goal difference; 3) number of goals scored.
(C) Champions

==== Results summary ====
Overall								Home						Away					
Pld	W	D	L	GF	GA	GD	Pts	W	D	L	GF	GA	GD	W	D	L	GF	GA	GD
10	5	2	3	21	9	+12	17	3	2	0	10	3	+7	2	0	3	11	6	+5

Source: worldfootball.net

==== Results by round ====
Round	1	2	3	4	5	6	7	8	9	10	11	12
Ground	H	A	B	A	H	A	H	A	H	H	B	A
Result	W	B	L	L	W	L	W	W	D	D	B	W
Position	2	4	4	5	4	5	4	4	4	4	4	4
Points	3	3	3	3	6	6	9	12	13	14	14	17

Source: worldfootball.net
A = Away; H = Home; W = Win; D = Draw; L = Loss

==== Matches ====
The league fixtures were announced on 27 September 2011.

Win Draw Loss

22 October 2011 1	Melbourne Victory	2–0	Perth Glory	Melbourne
17:00 AEDT	Friend 38'; Jackson 48'	Report		Stadium: Veneto Club; Referee: Kate Jacewicz

29 October 2011 2	Sydney FC	2–1	Melbourne Victory	Sydney
15:00 AEDT	Ledbrook 9'; Rapinoe 83'	Report	Taylor 63' (pen.)	Stadium: Leichhardt Oval; Referee: Jacqui Melksham

12 November 2011 4	Canberra United	2–1	Melbourne Victory	Canberra
15:00 AEDT	Sykes 24'; Hemmings 39'	Report	Fletcher 78'	Stadium: McKellar Park; Attendance: 732; Referee: Kate Jacewicz

19 November 2011 5	Melbourne Victory	4–0	Adelaide United	Melbourne
17:00 AEDT	Friend 16', 57', 80'; Taylor 23'	Report		Stadium: Veneto Club; Attendance: 556; Referee: Catherine Hoffman

26 November 2011 6	Brisbane Roar	1–0	Melbourne Victory	Brisbane
15:00 AEST	Gielnik 47'	Report		Stadium: Cleveland Showgrounds; Referee: Rebecca Durcau

3 December 2011 7	Melbourne Victory	2–1	Newcastle Jets	Geelong
15:00 AEDT	Taylor 41', 65'; Bolger 37'	Report		Stadium: Skilled Stadium; Referee: Catherine Hoffman

10 December 2011 8	Perth Glory	0–5	Melbourne Victory	Perth
16:00 AWST		Report	Gorry 3', 23'; Taylor 24', 62', 78'	Stadium: 6PR Stadium; Referee: David Costello

17 December 2011 9	Melbourne Victory	1–1	Brisbane Roar	Geelong
15:00 AEDT	Fletcher 78'	Report	Gielnik 90+1'	Stadium: Skilled Stadium; Referee: Kate Jacewicz

30 December 2011 10	Melbourne Victory	1–1	Canberra United	Melbourne
17:00 AEDT	Taylor 20' (pen.)	Report	Heyman 81'	Stadium: Veneto Club; Referee: Catherine Hoffman

15 January 2012 12	Adelaide United	1–4	Melbourne VIctory	Adelaide
15:00 ACDT	Rajcic 21'	Report	Gorry 31'; Brown 36'; Friend 45'; Fletcher 90'	Stadium: Burton Park; Referee: Stacey Sasopolous

==== Finals series ====
21 January 2012 Semi-finals	Canberra United	1–0	Melbourne Victory	Canberra
15:00 AEDT	Heyman 83'	Report		Stadium: McKellar Park; Attendance: 1,785; Referee: Kirralee Andruschak

== Squad statistics ==
No.	Pos.	Name	Apps	Goals	Yellow card	Red card
1	GK	(Australia) Brianna Davey	10	0	0	0
2	DF	(Australia) Rita Mankowska	5	0	0	0
3	MF	(Australia) Ashley Brown	11	1	0	0
4	DF	(United States) Kendall Fletcher	11	3	0	0
5	DF	(New Zealand) Rebekah Stott	11	0	1	0
6	DF	(Australia) Maika Ruyter-Hooley	10	0	1	0
7	DF	(Australia) Steph Catley	10	0	0	0
8	MF	(Australia) Enza Barilla	5	0	0	0
9	FW	(Australia) Georgie Koutrouvelis	6	0	0	0
10	FW	(England) Jodie Taylor	11	8	1	0
11	FW	(Australia) Caitlin Friend	11	4	0	0
12	MF	(Australia) Amy Jackson	11	1	1	0
13	MF	(Australia) Katrina Gorry	9	3	2	0
14	MF	(Australia) Stephanie Tanti	1	0	0	0
15	DF	(United States) Danielle Johnson	11	0	0	0
16	MF	(Australia) Louisa Bisby	6	0	0	0
17	DF	(Turkey) Gülcan Koca	2	0	0	0
18	DF	(Australia) Jackie Vogt	0	0	0	0
19	FW	(Australia) Laura Spiranovic	3	0	0	0
20	GK	(Australia) Cassandra Dimovski	1	0	0	0

Source: Soccerway

== Coaching staff ==
Vicki Linton returned for a second season at Melbourne Victory. Michael Edwards acted as an assistant for several matches before taking control of the 12 November match against Canberra United while Linton was coaching the Australia women's national under-17 soccer team at the 2011 AFC U-16 Women's Championship in China.

== Awards ==
- W-League Fair Play Award
- W-League Young Player of the Year: Ashley Brown
