= 2010–11 Melbourne Victory FC (women) season =

Melbourne Victory (W-League)
2010–11 season
- Chairman: Geoff Lord
- Head Coach: Vicki Linton
- W-League: 4th
- W-League Finals: Semi-finals
- Top goalscorer: League: Jodie Taylor (4); All: Jodie Taylor (4)
- Biggest win: 4–0 vs. Adelaide United (A) (26 November 2010); W-League
- Biggest defeat: 1–5 vs. Sydney FC (A) (6 February 2011); W-League Finals
Home colours	Away colours

The 2010–11 season was Melbourne Victory Football Club (W-League)'s third season, in the W-League. Melbourne Victory finished 4th in their W-League season, finishing in the semi-finals.

== Players ==
Note: Flags indicate national team as defined under FIFA eligibility rules; some limited exceptions apply. Players may hold more than one non-FIFA nationality.

No.	Pos.	Nation	Player
1	GK	AUS	Melissa Barbieri (captain)
2	DF	AUS	Rita Mankowska
3	DF	NZL	Marlies Oostdam
5	MF	AUS	Louisa Bisby
6	DF	AUS	Maika Ruyter-Hooley
7	FW	AUS	Snez Veljanovska
8	MF	AUS	Ella Mastrantonio
9	DF	AUS	Steph Catley
10	DF	ENG	Jodie Taylor
11	DF	USA	Kendall Fletcher

No.	Pos.	Nation	Player
12	MF	AUS	Amy Jackson
13	FW	AUS	Ashley Brown
15	FW	AUS	Deanna Niceski
16	MF	TUR	Gülcan Koca
17	FW	AUS	Caitlin Friend
18	MF	AUS	Ursula Hughson
19	DF	AUS	Enza Barilla
20	GK	AUS	Brianna Davey
30	GK	AUS	Nicole Paul

== Transfers ==
=== Transfers in ===
No.	Position	Name	From	Type/fee	Date
7	FW	Snez Veljanovska	Canberra United	Free transfer	July 2010
8	MF	Ella Mastrantonio	Perth Glory	Free transfer	July 2010
11	DF	(United States) Kendall Fletcher	Central Coast Mariners	Free transfer	July 2010
2	FW	Rita Mankowska	(Australia) Heidelberg United	Free transfer	September 2010
10	DF	(England) Jodie Taylor	(Canada) Ottawa Fury	Free transfer	September 2010

=== Transfers out ===
No.	Position	Name	To	Type/fee	Date
2	DF	Vedrana Popovic	Adelaide United	Free transfer	June 2010
5	DF	Laura Alleway	Brisbane Roar	Free transfer	June 2010
12	MF	Monnique Hansen Kofoed	Perth Glory	Free transfer	June 2010
13	MF	Katrina Gorry	Adelaide United	Free transfer	June 2010
14	MF	Selin Kuralay	Adelaide United	Free transfer	June 2010
21	MF	Kara Mowbray	Newcastle Jets	Free transfer	June 2010

== Competitions ==
=== Overall record ===
Competition	First match	Last match	Starting round	Final position	Record							
Competition	First match	Last match	Starting round	Final position	Pld	W	D	L	GF	GA	GD	Win %
W-League	13 November 2010	29 January 2011	Matchday 1	4th	10	4	3	3	12	11	+1	40.00
W-League Finals	6 February 2011		Semi-finals	Semi-finals	1	0	0	1	1	5	−4	0.00
Total					11	4	3	4	13	16	−3	36.36

Source: Competitions

=== W-League ===
==== League table ====
Pos	Team	Pld	W	D	L	GF	GA	GD	Pts	Qualification
1	Sydney FC	10	8	0	2	29	9	+20	24	Qualification to Finals series
2	Brisbane Roar (C)	10	6	3	1	17	7	+10	21	Qualification to Finals series
3	Canberra United	10	5	2	3	16	9	+7	17	Qualification to Finals series
4	Melbourne Victory	10	4	3	3	12	11	+1	15	Qualification to Finals series
5	Perth Glory	10	4	1	5	11	15	−4	13	
6	Newcastle Jets	10	3	1	6	13	15	−2	10	
7	Adelaide United	10	0	0	10	4	36	−32	0	

Source: au.soccerway.com
Rules for classification: 1) points; 2) goal difference; 3) number of goals scored.
(C) Champions

==== Results summary ====
Overall								Home						Away					
Pld	W	D	L	GF	GA	GD	Pts	W	D	L	GF	GA	GD	W	D	L	GF	GA	GD
10	4	3	3	12	11	+1	15	2	0	3	5	9	−4	2	3	0	7	2	+5

Source: worldfootball.net

==== Results by round ====
Round	1	2	3	4	5	6	7	8	9	10	11	12
Ground	B	H	A	A	H	B	H	A	H	A	A	H
Result	B	L	D	W	L	L	B	W	W	D	D	W
Position	4	6	6	5	6	6	6	5	4	5	5	4
Points	0	0	1	4	4	4	4	7	10	11	12	15

Source: worldfootball.net
A = Away; H = Home; B = Bye; W = Win; D = Draw; L = Loss

==== Matches ====
The league fixtures were announced on 20 August 2010.

Win Draw Loss

13 November 2010 2	Melbourne Victory	1–4	Sydney FC	Morwell
19:00 AEDT	Taylor 29' (pen.)	Report	Simon 27', 37'; Brogan 88'; Polias 90'	Stadium: Latrobe City Stadium; Referee: Catherine Hofmann

20 November 2010 3	Canberra United	1–1	Melbourne Victory	Canberra
17:00 AEDT	Cooper 6'	Report	Ruyter-Hooley 90+5'	Stadium: McKellar Park; Attendance: 836; Referee: Kate Jacewicz

26 November 2010 4	Adelaide United	0–4	Melbourne Victory	Adelaide
16:45 ACDT		Report	Fletcher 33'; Friend 47'; Taylor 53', 90+2'	Stadium: Hindmarsh Stadium; Referee: Stacey Sasopolous

4 December 2010 5	Melbourne Victory	1–4	Brisbane Roar	Melbourne
15:00 AEDT	Friend 65'	Report	Butt 23', 25'; De Vanna 71'; Gielnik 81'	Stadium: AAMI Park; Referee: Peta McCallum

18 December 2010 7	Melbourne Victory	0–1	Perth Glory	Melbourne
16:15 AEDT		Report	Kofoed 82'	Stadium: AAMI Park; Referee: Catherine Hofmann

2 January 2011 8	Newcastle Jets	0–1	Melbourne Victory	Newcastle
15:00 AEDT		Report	Jackson 47'	Stadium: Wanderers Oval; Referee: Kirralee Gardiner

8 January 2011 9	Melbourne Victory	1–0	Canberra United	Geelong
15:00 AEDT	Taylor 20'	Report		Stadium: Skilled Stadium; Referee: Stacey Sasopolous

16 January 2011 10	Brisbane Roar	0–0	Melbourne Victory	Melbourne
16:00 AEDT		Report		Stadium: Epping Stadium; Referee: Catherine Hofmann
Note: Match originally located for Perry Park, but relocated due to poor weather conditions. It was relocated to Epping Stadium.

23 January 2011 11	Perth Glory	1–1	Melbourne Victory	Perth
17:00 AWST	D'Ovidio 39'	Report	Catley 47'	Stadium: 6PR Stadium; Referee: Kirralee Gardener

29 January 2011 12	Melbourne Victory	2–0	Adelaide United	Melbourne
17:00 AEDT	Catley 1'; Friend 85'	Report		Stadium: John Cain Memorial Reserve; Referee: Catherine Hofmann

==== Finals series ====
6 February 2011 Semi-finals	Sydney FC	5–1	Melbourne Victory	Sydney
15:00 AEDT	Khamis 26', 75'; Uzunlar 38' (pen.); Simon 74'; Bolger 88'	Report	Catley 30'	Stadium: Campbelltown Stadium; Attendance: 912; Referee: Kirralee Gardiner

== Statistics ==
=== Appearances and goals ===
Includes all competitions. Players with no appearances not included in the list.

No.	Pos.	Nat.	Name	W-League		Total	
No.	Pos.	Nat.	Name	Apps	Goals	Apps	Goals
1	GK	(Australia)	Melissa Barbieri	7	0	7	0
2	DF	(Australia)	Rita Mankowska	2+2	0	4	0
3	DF	(New Zealand)	Marlies Oostdam	9	0	9	0
5	MF	(Australia)	Louisa Bisby	6+2	0	8	0
6	DF	(Australia)	Maika Ruyter-Hooley	10	1	10	1
7	FW	(Australia)	Snez Veljanovska	4+3	0	7	0
8	MF	(Australia)	Ella Mastrantonio	10	0	10	0
9	DF	(Australia)	Steph Catley	9	2	9	2
10	DF	(England)	Jodie Taylor	8+1	4	9	4
11	DF	(United States)	Kendall Fletcher	10	1	10	1
12	MF	(Australia)	Amy Jackson	10	1	10	1
13	FW	(Australia)	Ashley Brown	9+1	0	10	0
15	FW	(Australia)	Deanna Niceski	0+1	0	1	0
16	MF	(Turkey)	Gülcan Koca	0+1	0	1	0
17	FW	(Australia)	Caitlin Friend	6+4	3	10	3
18	MF	(Australia)	Ursula Hughson	7+2	0	9	0
19	DF	(Australia)	Enza Barilla	0+9	0	9	0
20	GK	(Australia)	Brianna Davey	3	0	3	0

=== Disciplinary record ===
Includes all competitions. The list is sorted by squad number when total cards are equal. Players with no cards not included in the list.

Rank	No.	Pos.	Nat.	Name	W-League			Total		
Rank	No.	Pos.	Nat.	Name	Booked	(yellow card) (yellow-red card)	Sent off (straight red)	Booked	(yellow card) (yellow-red card)	Sent off (straight red)
1	17	FW	(Australia)	Caitlin Friend	2	0	0	2	0	0
2	5	MF	(Australia)	Louisa Bisby	1	0	0	1	0	0
2	9	DF	(Australia)	Steph Catley	1	0	0	1	0	0
Total					4	0	0	4	0	0

=== Clean sheets ===
Includes all competitions. The list is sorted by squad number when total clean sheets are equal. Numbers in parentheses represent games where both goalkeepers participated and both kept a clean sheet; the number in parentheses is awarded to the goalkeeper who was substituted on, whilst a full clean sheet is awarded to the goalkeeper who was on the field at the start of play. Goalkeepers with no clean sheets not included in the list.

Rank	No.	Nat.	Goalkeeper	W-League	Total
1	1	(Australia)	Melissa Barbieri	4	4
2	20	(Australia)	Brianna Davey	1	1
Total				5	5
