= History Teachers' Association of Victoria =

Teacher professional association

- The History Teachers' Association of Victoria Ltd.
- HTAV logo
- Formation: 1980
- Headquarters: Suite 105, 134–136 Cambridge Street
- Location: Collingwood, Victoria, Australia
- Region served: Victoria
- Services: Professional association
- Members: 4878 (2024)
- Revenue: A$1,334,149 (2023)
- Expenses: A$1,300,712 (2023)
- Staff: 12 (2023)
- Volunteers: 26 (2023)
- Website: www.htav.asn.au

The History Teachers' Association of Victoria (HTAV) is a professional association representing and supporting teachers of history in Victoria, Australia. The HTAV was founded by a group of teachers and was incorporated in Melbourne in 1980.

== History ==
The History Teachers’ Association of Victoria was incorporated as a legal entity in November 1980. It serves as a continuation of the Victorian Historical Association. The first Bulletin of the Victorian Historical Association, published in October 1959 claimed that 'This association of school and university history teachers is concerned to provide history teachers with a forum in which they can discuss professional matters. To this end it holds a number of meetings throughout the school year, sponsors lectures, discussions, film nights and displays.' The publishing activities of the association expanded through the late 1960s. In 1967 it produced two regular publications, Historian and Agora, joined by a third two years later, the Journal of History for Senior Students, which was to be edited by Don Gibb from its inception.

In 1968, attempts were made to establish regional groups, ten in total, but these seem to have been relatively unsuccessful. At that year's AGM, a constitution for the association was adopted, formalising the VHA's existence.

The 1970s, despite concerns about the threat to History in schools voiced in the late 1960s, feature continuing growth and expansion of the association's activities although the decade appears to have culminated in crisis. Student 'seminars' in Australian history were held for the first time in the third (last) term of 1971 at Latrobe and Monash Universities, with approximately 1800 students attending. In terms of membership, the association continued to grow throughout the decade. By 1972, AGM membership climbed to 673. In 1975, when the VHA moved to premises at 85 Howard St., North Melbourne, which it shared with the Geography Teachers Association, membership had risen to 945, and was to reach 1144 by 1979.

Moves were made to set up a national association of History teachers, and the VHA was given the task of drawing up a draft constitution for the proposed body, which was to have been launched at Sydney University in May 1973. Ultimately, this national body was formed and exists today as the History Teachers’ Association of Australia. The VHA hosted the HTAA National Conference from 26–30 May 1978. This close association with the national body continued over subsequent decades with the HTAV hosting national conferences on a number of occasions, most recently in 2004.

1978–79 was described in the president's report as a 'challenging year' during which it 'survived financial crisis'. That period of crisis seems to have led to a desire to reform the organisation with a new name and identity – the History Teachers’ Association of Victoria. In November 1980, the organisation now known as the HTAV was established with Bob Neal as its first president.

With a new identity as the HTAV, during the 1980s the association continued to evolve towards its current form. Perhaps the most enduring legacy was the 1986 acquisition of a permanent address for the organisation, 'The Bakery' at 402 Smith St, Collingwood. From around the mid-1980s, with Tim Gurry in the role of the executive officer, the association expanded its repertoire of activities. The publication of teaching resources and education kits constituted nearly half of the association's income in any one year.

In the early 1990s the threat seemed to be coming from 'Australian Studies'; the HTAV mobilised to meet it by running conferences on how it could be used to increase the amount of History being taught. Most conferences during this period were held at the Collingwood Football Club, of which the association was a member. The HTAV moved from 'The Bakery' to the Veneto Club in Bulleen.

The loss of considerable state government funding during the early 1990s however meant that there was no longer the same level of government support for the association. The decline in education budgets also meant that levels of membership declined through the second half of the 1990s. This had rather significant implications for the financial viability of the association. This is perhaps nowhere more vividly illustrated than in the annual reports of the late 90s when the association experience a loss of over $60,000. Despite funding issues, the HTAV represented teachers of history in the development of the Victorian Certificate of Education, the Curriculum and Standards Framework (CSF) and it successor the CSFII and more recently AUSVELS.

In 2024, the association published Teaching Ancient Australia, an print and Ebook textbook to aid archaeological history teaching.

== Publications ==
The association has two ongoing publications: Member Bulletin, an electronic newsletter; and Agora, the triannual journal.

== Awards ==
The association gives out numerous awards to nominated members for excellence in history teaching and contributing to the association.

== Executive directors ==
- Tim Gurry (1984-1994)
- John Cantwell
- Jacqualine Hollingworth
- Michael Spurr (2005-2007)
- Nick Ewbank (2007-2008)
- Annabel Astbury (2008-2011)
- Ingrid Purnell (acting, 2011)
- Richard Smith (2012-2015)
- Ingrid Purnell (2015-2017)
- Deb Hull (2017-present)
