= Ermin Smrekar =

Australian architect (1931–2016)

- Born: 1931; Trieste, Italy
- Died: 25 June 2016 (aged 84–85)
- Occupation: Architect

Ermin Smrekar (1931–25 June 2016) (FAIA) was an Italian born Australian architect who practiced in Melbourne, Australia from the 1960s to the 1990s. He is known for designing outside the mainstream of Australian architecture in the period, his individual approach drew from organic architecture, angular and circular geometries, as well as historical sources, to create sometimes bold sculptural forms.

== Early life and training ==
Originally named 'Erminio', Ermin Smrekar was born in 1931 in the Italian city of Trieste, near the border of Slovenia, the unusual surname hinting at a Slovenian background. He undertook his initial training at the Leonardo da Vinci State Technical Institute, and then studied architecture at the University of Trieste. This was in the early post World War II period, when Trieste, a city with a very long multicultural history, was controlled by joint US-UK military administration and claimed by both Italy and Yugoslavia. In 1954 when it was returned to Italian control, life for many Triestini became suddenly difficult, and within a few years thousands emigrated, many to Australia. In 1956 Ermin joined the exodus, along with his parents, father Carlo (died 1980) and mother Bruna (1913-2015), arriving on the Aurelia. The family lived in Moonee Ponds, in Melbourne's northern suburbs and Smrekar continued his education at the University of Melbourne Design Atelier (1960 – 1962) and the Royal Melbourne Institute of Technology (RMIT), registering as an Architect in 1963.

Ermin began his architectural practice in 1964 and established Smrekar Architects in 1969. The firm operated up to 2007 when it amalgamated with BGA Architects of Bendigo to form e+ architecture, continuing to operate from the same Melbourne office and retaining senior key personnel from Smrekar Architects. Smrekar had previously worked with Terry Mitton for 12 years before the latter joined BGA as a director in 1998.

== Architecture ==
Smrekar's work was highly individual, lying well outside the mainstream of architecture of his adopted country. His work reveals a range influences, including the organic architecture of Frank Lloyd Wright and the off-form concrete of Brutalist architecture, also seen in the work of fellow Italian emigre, Canberra architect Enrico Taglietti. He may also have been influenced by the sculptural, expressive and sometimes historicist Italian architecture of the 1950s and 60s, such as works by Luigi Moretti, Marcello D'Olivo, Carlo Scarpa and architect and theorist Paolo Portoghesi. His work was often bold and sculptural, featuring battered walls, horizontal emphasis with protruding cantilevered elements, sharp angles and quarter and semi-circular elements in plan and detailing, and later stepped, gridded and triangular geometries, to create sometimes dramatic forms.

The most outstanding of his 70s work includes the 1972 Fisherman's Pier restaurant in Geelong, variously described as like an oyster shell or upturned hull, but also employing angled forms and concrete and timber marked with bold parallel lines, reminiscent of Frank Lloyd Wright and Carlo Scarpa. His Veneto Club in Bulleen is another boldly sculptural work, a square set on the diagonal, the floors supported and demarcated by deep concrete beams projecting out to form cantilevered balconies, the central beams marked by a geometric pattern of superimposed circles, rectangles, lines and squares.

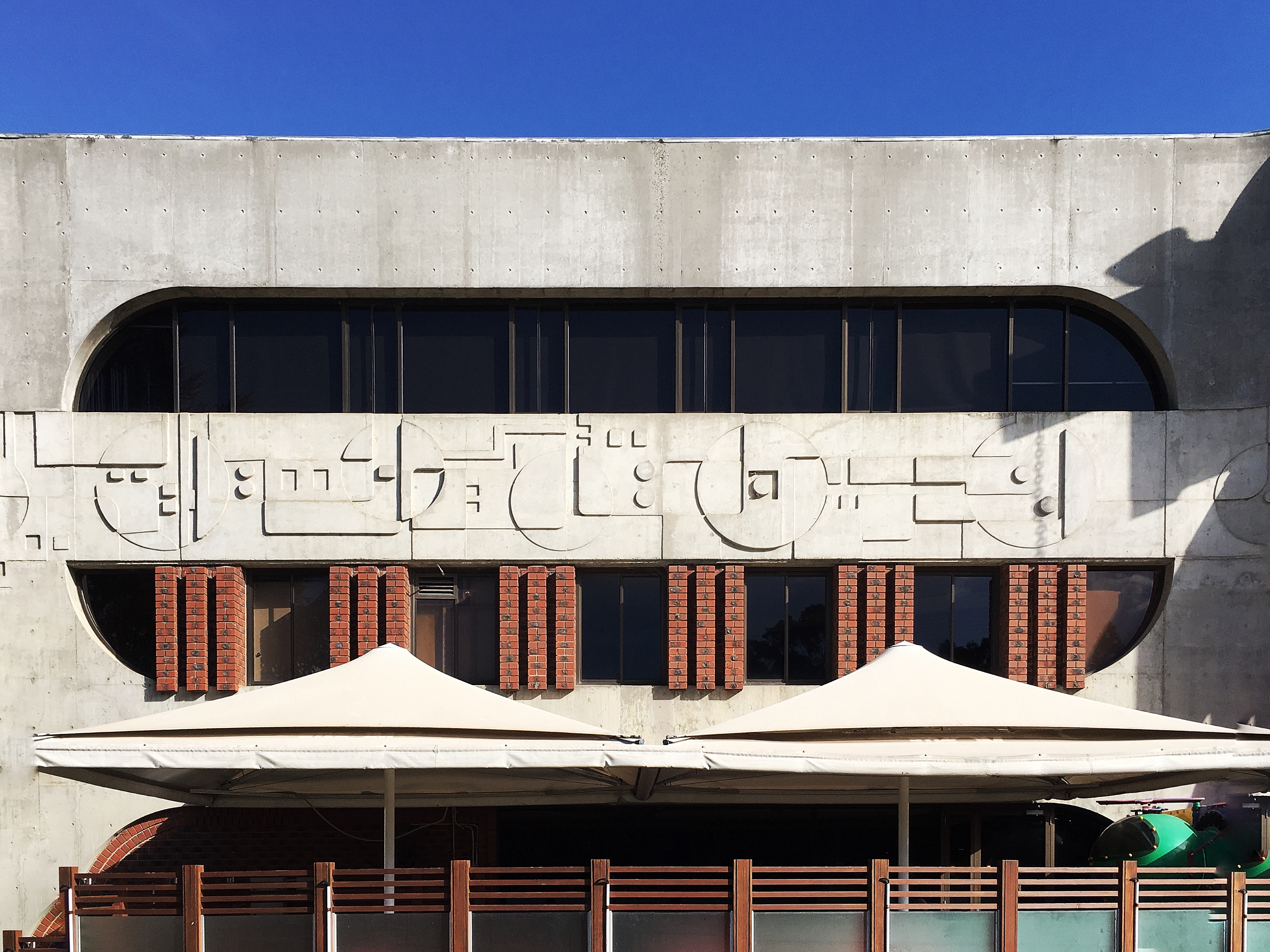
Patterned concrete, Veneto Club, Bulleen 1972-73

Many of his projects had a connection to the Italian community in Victoria, and in particular Trieste emigres, such as the remodeling of a factory in Essendon for the Trieste community's San Giusto Alabarda Club, the Veneto Club, a social venue for the 'Veneti' Italian community in the northeast suburb of Bulleen, where he is also credited with designing a "...variety of large homes.... which were designed with a distinct 'Mediterranean feel' for an Italian clientele." He designed three projects on Lygon Street, Carlton, which had become the heart of the Italian community by the 1950s, a position it still holds. Lygon Lodge was the first in 1967, followed by the controversial Lygon Court Shopping Centre in the 1980s, which involved community action to save the historic Holdsworth Building, and the loss of The Pram Factory theatre at the rear, and finally the Clocktower development of shops, apartment and offices arranged around an Italian style courtyard complete with clocktower, in the early 1990s. Two of his churches were designed at least in part to serve Italian congregations; St Mel's in Shepparton was built to serve a Catholic congregation bolstered by significant Italian postwar migration, and St Luke's in Lalor served a local population that was 40% Italian by the 70s.

Probably his most well known design, but least representative, is the Old Melbourne Motor Inn, completed in 1971 for prominent Melbourne hotel entrepreneur George Frew, for whom Smrekar would also later design the San Giorgio Restaurant in Carlton (demolished). This design, with its overtly historicist aspects such as use of reclaimed bluestone and bricks, mansard roof forms and cast-iron lace balconies earned him the nickname "The King of Kitsch", and a scathing review from modernist architect and critic Robin Boyd, cementing Smrekar's reputation as unconcerned with modernist orthodoxies. His Eureka Stockade basement restaurant in Bourke Street completed the same year was equally historicist, again with second hand bricks and cast iron lace, and a central circular space defined by a rough timber post and beam structure.

A landmark of his later work is the cliff-top residence 'Miramare' at San Remo Victoria, built in the mid 1980s. It employs dramatic opposing triangular forms, huge areas of glass, and interpenetrating double height spaces and walkways, described as having "... a kind of discordant splendor."

== Works ==
- Mirabella House, 38 Henry Street, Keilor East (1966)
- Lygon Lodge Hotel/Motel, 220 Lygon Street, Carlton (1967)[altered beyond recognition]
- Own house, 14 Carn Avenue, Ivanhoe (1969)
- St Mel's Church, Shepparton (1970)
- Old Melbourne Motor Inn, North Melbourne (1971)
- High rise flats, The Avenue, Parkville (1971)
- Eureka Stockade Restaurant, 287 Bourke Street, Melbourne (1971) [demolished]
- Fisherman's Pier Restaurant, Eastern Beach Road, Geelong (1972)
- Veneto Club, Bulleen (1972)
- Lenna Hotel extension, Runnymede Street, Hobart (1973)
- St Luke's Church, 1A David Street, Lalor (1975)
- San Giorgio's Restaurant, Carlton (1972-1986) [demolished]
- Eastern Beach Townhouses, 64-66 Eastern Beach Road, Geelong (1978)
- Parliament House, Canberra [competition entry] (1979)
- Lygon Court Shopping Centre, Carlton (1980) [altered]
- Office building, 568 Collins Street, Melbourne (1981)
- Vaccari (now San Carlo) Home for the Aged, Plenty Road, South Morang (1983) [altered] and San Carlo Chapel (1984)
- 'Miramare', Punchbowl Road, Cape Woolamai, San Remo (mid 1980s)
- Melrose Melbourne Reception Centre, Melrose Drive, Tullamarine (1983)
- Office building, 555 Lonsdale Street, Melbourne (1988) for Hooker Projects
- 'Clock Tower' development, Drummond Street and Lygon Street, Carlton (1992)

== Awards, exhibitions, critical reception ==
Smrekar was a Fellow of the Australian Institute of Architects (1973), and was awarded the Cavaliere dell' Ordine al Merito della Repubblica Italiana in 1973 and the Cavaliere Ufficiale dell' Ordine al Merito della Repubblica Italiana in 1983 for Services to Architecture. He also presented a Personal Architectural Exhibition in Trieste in 1990.

Smrekar's work divided opinion during the 1970s, though in the late 1970s he was championed by architect and critic Norman Day as a "concerned and talented individualist."

It was not until the late 2000s that his work was again came to attention and was celebrated, especially by architects. Six of his works are listed as possibly of State heritage significance in the 2007 Survey of Post-War Built Heritage in Victoria, and his entry in the Encyclopedia of Australian Architecture (2011) notes that his designs "have been celebrated by architects because they inspired new references for a modern Australian architectural language." He was one of the first to feature in the online Dictionary of Unsung Architects, a list of lesser known Victorian postwar architects.

Smrekar died on 25 June 2016.

== Biographical sources ==
- Biographical cuttings on Ermin Smrekar, architect, containing one or more cuttings from newspapers or journals
