= Caitlin Friend =

Australian soccer player

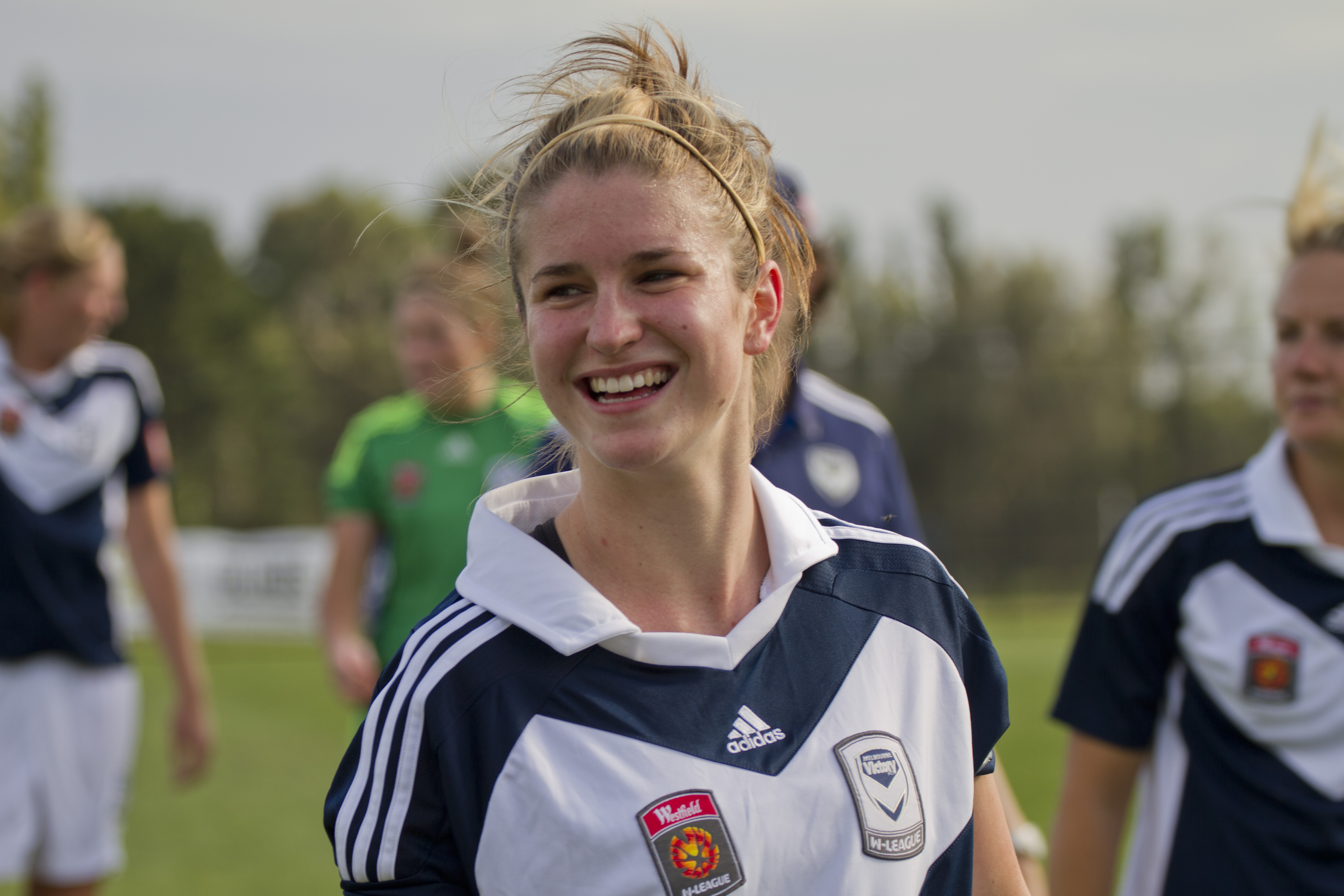
- Friend with Melbourne Victory in 2012

Personal information
- Full name: Caitlin Friend
- Date of birth: 10 November 1993 (age 32)
- Place of birth: Melbourne, Australia
- Height: 1.67 m (5 ft 6 in)
- Position: Forward

Team information
- Current team: Melbourne Victory
- Number: 22

Senior career*
| Years | Team | Apps | (Gls) |
| 2009–2014 | Melbourne Victory | 43 | (15) |
| 2014 | Notts County | 9 | (0) |
| 2014–2015 | Melbourne Victory | 3 | (0) |
| 2015–2016 | Bulleen Lions | | |
| 2016– | Melbourne Victory | 0 | (0) |

International career^{‡}
| | Australia U17 | | (9) |
- Australia U20
- * Club domestic league appearances and goals as of 5 March 2017 ‡ National team caps and goals as of 28 January 2014

Caitlin Friend (born 10 November 1993) is an Australian football (soccer) striker who plays for Melbourne Victory.

== Early life ==
Friend started playing football from the age of seven. At the age of 12, she was removed from her club after they banned girls from playing. After playing tennis for a year, she returned to local football club Brunswick Zebras.

== Playing career ==
In January 2014, Friend agreed to join English FA WSL club Notts County after the Australian season had concluded, a season in which she had overtaken Jodie Taylor as Melbourne Victory's all-time top goalscorer.

After the WSL 2014 season, the Australian striker returned to Australia to play for Melbourne Victory after a year with Notts County. In January 2015 it was confirmed she would not be returning to Notts County for the 2015 season.

In October 2016, Friend returned to Melbourne Victory.

== Post-playing career ==
Following Friend's retirement, she set up a training company called Elite Female Football, which works on training young female footballers. She was joined in this venture by Ashley Brown, Brianna Davey and Steph Catley.
