= Tine Cederkvist =

Danish association footballer (born 1979)

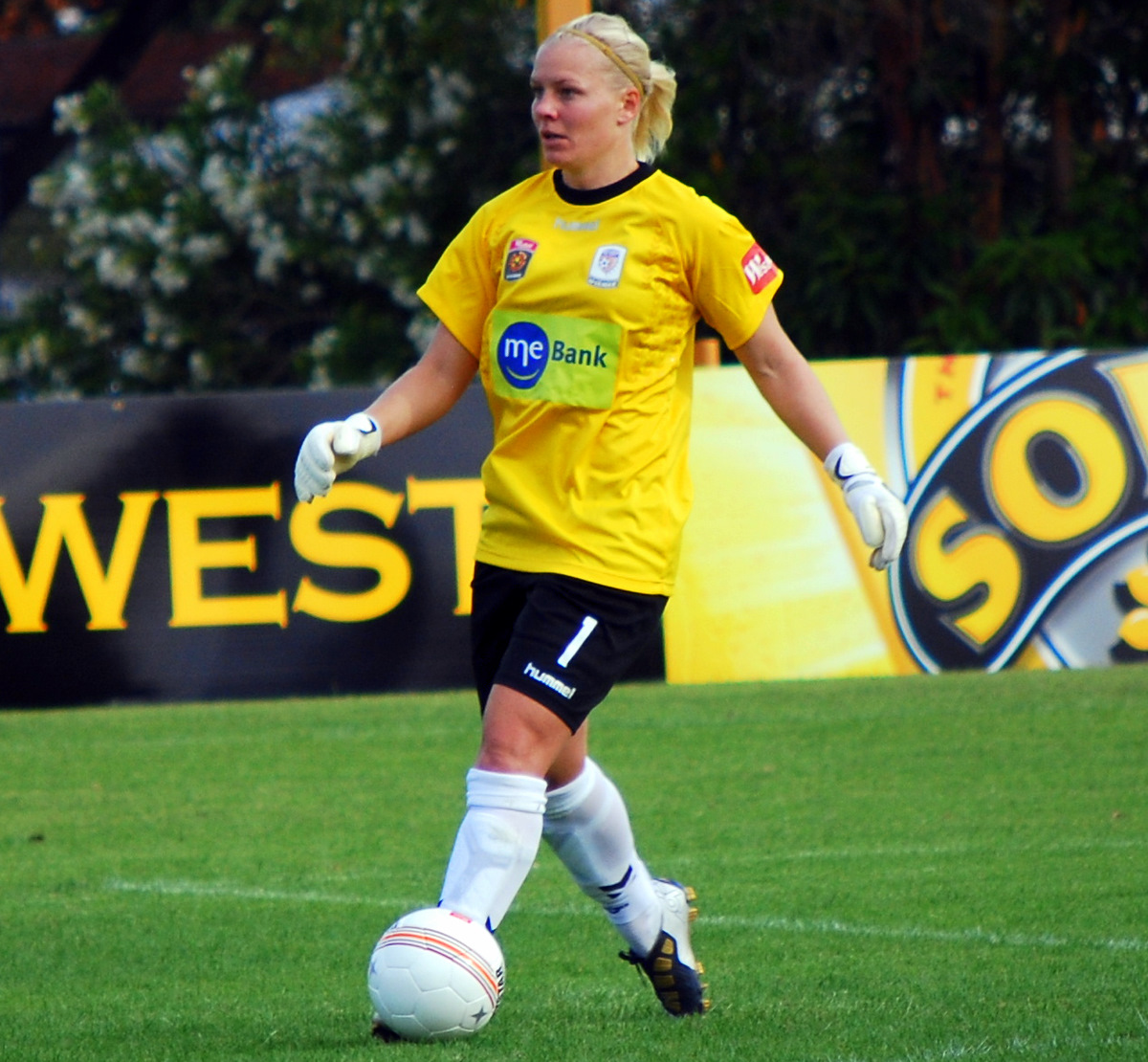

Personal information
- Full name: Tine Cederkvist Viskær
- Date of birth: 21 March 1979 (age 47)
- Place of birth: Denmark
- Height: 1.75 m (5 ft 9 in)
- Position: Goalkeeper

Youth career
- –1996: GVI

Senior career*
Years	Team	Apps	(Gls)
1996–2001	Hillerød G&IF		
2001–2008	Brøndby IF	216	(0)
2009–2012	FC Rosengård		
2010–2011	→ Perth Glory (loan)	20	(0)
2011	→ Linköping FC (loan)	10	(0)
2011–2012	BSF		

International career
2000–2011	Denmark	68	(0)
- * Club domestic league appearances and goals

Tine Cederkvist Viskær (born 21 March 1979) is a Danish physiotherapist, football coach and former goalkeeper who represented the Danish national team.

== Club career ==
Cederkvist played most of her football with Danish sides Hillerød G&I and top tier club Brøndby IF, the latter for which she earned a total of 216 caps across all competitions. She appeared for Damallsvenskan sides FC Rosengård and Linköping FC, as well as Australian W-League club Perth Glory. Cederkvist spent her last season with Danish top tier side BSF before retiring her active playing career in 2012.
