= Lara Filocamo =

Australian rules footballer

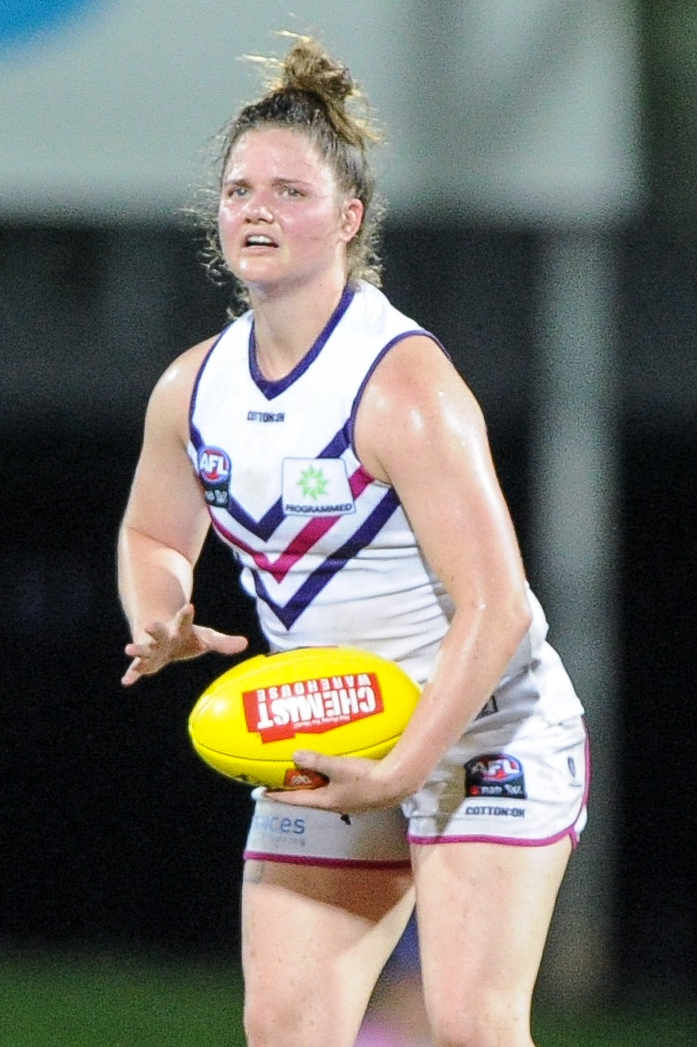
- Filocamo playing for Fremantle in January 2018

Personal information
- Born: 15 September 1990 (age 36)
- Original team: Coastal Titans (WAWFL)
- Draft: No. 29, 2016 AFL Women's draft
- Debut: Round 1, 2017, Fremantle vs. Western Bulldogs, at VU Whitten Oval
- Height: 161 cm (5 ft 3 in)
- Position: Midfielder

Playing career^{1}
Years	Club	Games (Goals)
2017–2018	Fremantle	14 (2)
- ^{1} Playing statistics correct to the end of 2017.

Lara Filocamo (born 15 September 1990) is an Australian rules footballer who played for the Fremantle Football Club in the AFL Women's competition. Filocamo was drafted by Fremantle with their fourth selection and twenty-ninth overall in the 2016 AFL Women's draft. She made her debut in the thirty-two point loss to the Western Bulldogs at VU Whitten Oval in the opening round of the 2017 season. She played every match in her debut season to finish with seven matches. She was delisted by Fremantle at the end of the 2018 season.
