= Kissie =

Swedish blogger

Alexandra Nilsson
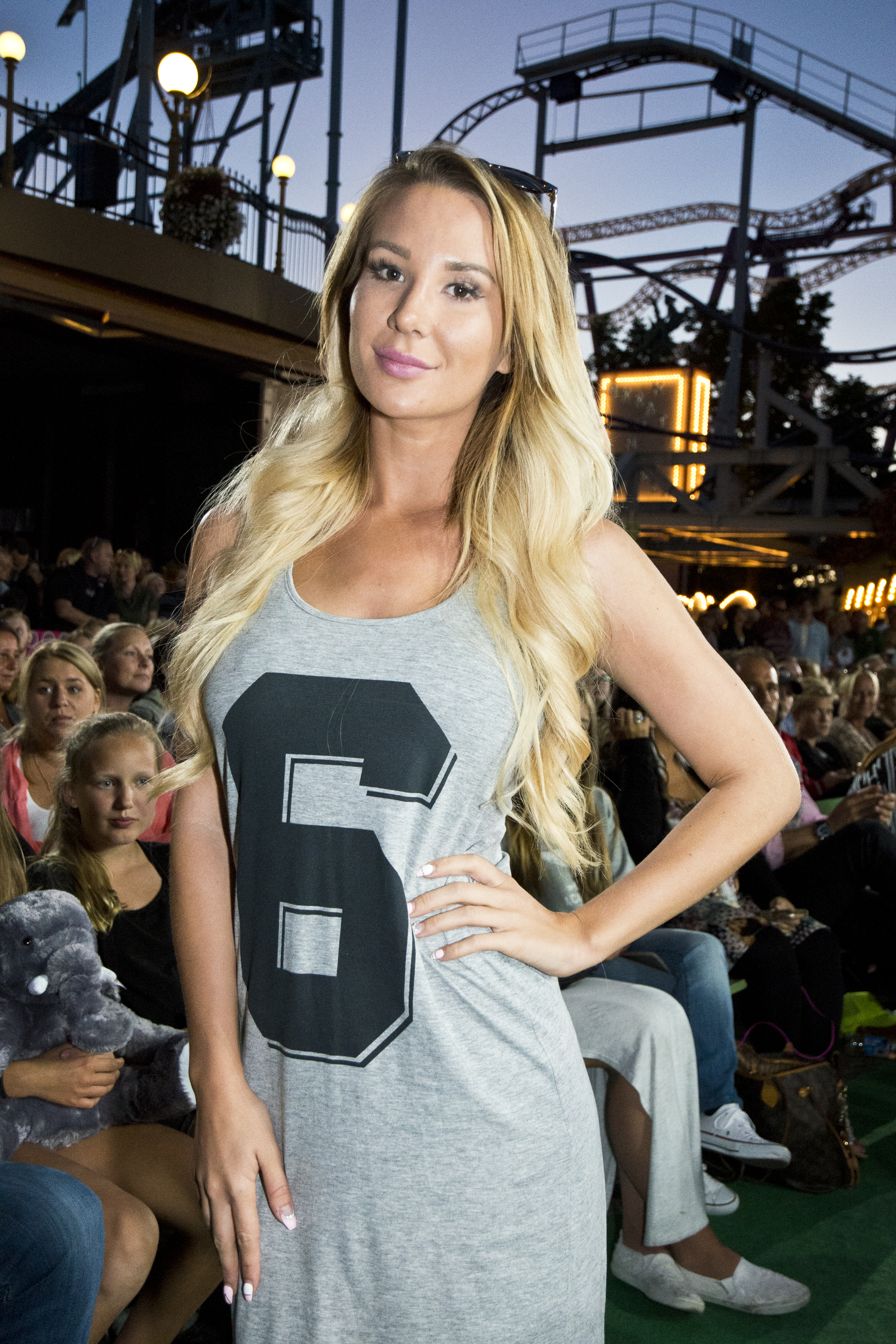
- Kissie at Gröna Lund in Stockholm, Sweden during Sommarkrysset in August 2015
- Born: Alexandra Barbara Nilsson; 18 April 1991 (age 35); Stockholm, Sweden
- Other name: Kissie
- Occupations: blogger, singer

Alexandra Barbara Nilsson (born 18 April 1991), also known as Kissie, is a Swedish blogger.

Kissie was born in Stockholm to a Swedish father and a Polish mother.

She started her blog in January 2007 at the age of 15.

In June 2010, having just turned 17, Kissie started her music career by recording "Success" which was released a month later.

Since the political 2010 election in Sweden, Kissie has expressed critical opinions regarding Sweden's left-wing political parties, and encouraged her readers not to vote for them.

In 2010, Flashback released an uncensored version of a nude photograph she had previously published on her blog. She later admitted that she had released the photograph for media attention, but claimed that she had not actually been nude when the photograph was taken, but rather had had her clothes edited out by digital image manipulation.

In 2017, the Swedish Consumer Ombudsman charged Kissie, who operates her blog under the aegis of Kissie Media AB, with implying a personal recommendation for some products when actually the product is being marketed through the operations of Kissie Media. If intended to deceive readers, this is illegal. Kissie contested this claim, holding that modern consumers are media-savvy enough to know the difference between truly personal recommendations and paid advertisements. In January 2018 the Swedish Patent and Market Court ruled that two posts by Kissie had indeed failed to provide a sufficiently clear indication that they were advertisements.

In 2019, Kissie announced in a popular podcast that she will change her name from Nilsson to her mother's Polish maiden family name Pietruniak, because "Nilsson is a boring name, it can be anyone" and because she has realized that it is "cool to have an identity that is not only Swedish". When Kissie first disclosed her Polish background on her blog she received a lot of abusive xenophobic comments, for example telling her to "return to Poland".

Kissie closed her blog in 2020 and deleted its archives, saying "I can no longer look back and feel proud of anything. I have felt in recent days that I have regretted starting the blog... Right now I feel that the blog has taken everything from me instead of giving me everything", although "I have often thought that I must be grateful that the blog gave me a chance to become a not-so-ordinary person." She stated her intent to continue to be active on YouTube and Instagram.
