= Veneto Club =

Club in Melbourne, Victoria, Australia

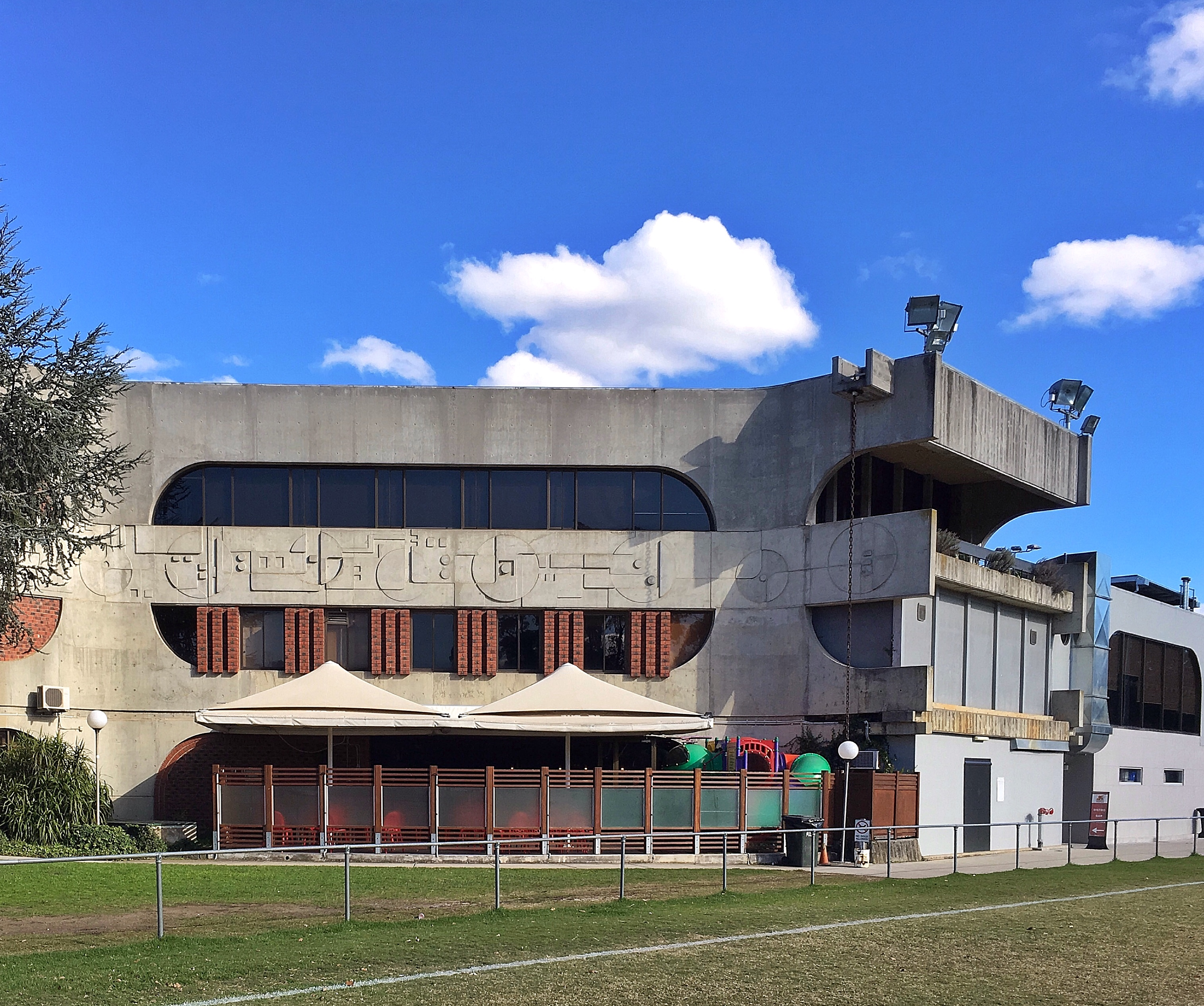
Veneto Club

The Veneto Club is an Italian social club in Bulleen, Victoria, Australia. It was established in the late 1960s on a site in the eastern suburbs, where many Italian migrants had relocated after leaving the working class inner suburbs, which had an established Italian population. A substantial Brutalist style building was erected in 1972-73, to the design of the Italian émigré architect Ermin Smrekar.

Located at 191 Bulleen Road Bulleen, the Veneto Club has its origins in the 1960s during informal gatherings of some Melbourne-based "Veneti" gathered for social activities including bocce games. In 1969 a group of Italian businessmen purchased 16 acres of land in Bulleen and erected a small shed, known as "la Baracca", as a shelter and informal clubhouse. On 8 December 1973, the new Smrekar-designed building, was opened by Billy Snedden, in front of a crowd of 3000 people. The Italian Ambassador to Australia attended the opening.

The site includes extensive grounds and playing fields including the David Barro Stadium, home of Victorian Premier League, tier 2 football (soccer) club FC Bulleen Lions. The Veneto Club has also been the venue for the Women's National Basketball League team the Bulleen Boomers since 1984. The History Teachers' Association of Victoria was based here in the 1990s.

It has been the venue for the Italian Food and Wine Festival for several years.
