= Shannon May =

Australian soccer player (born 1991)

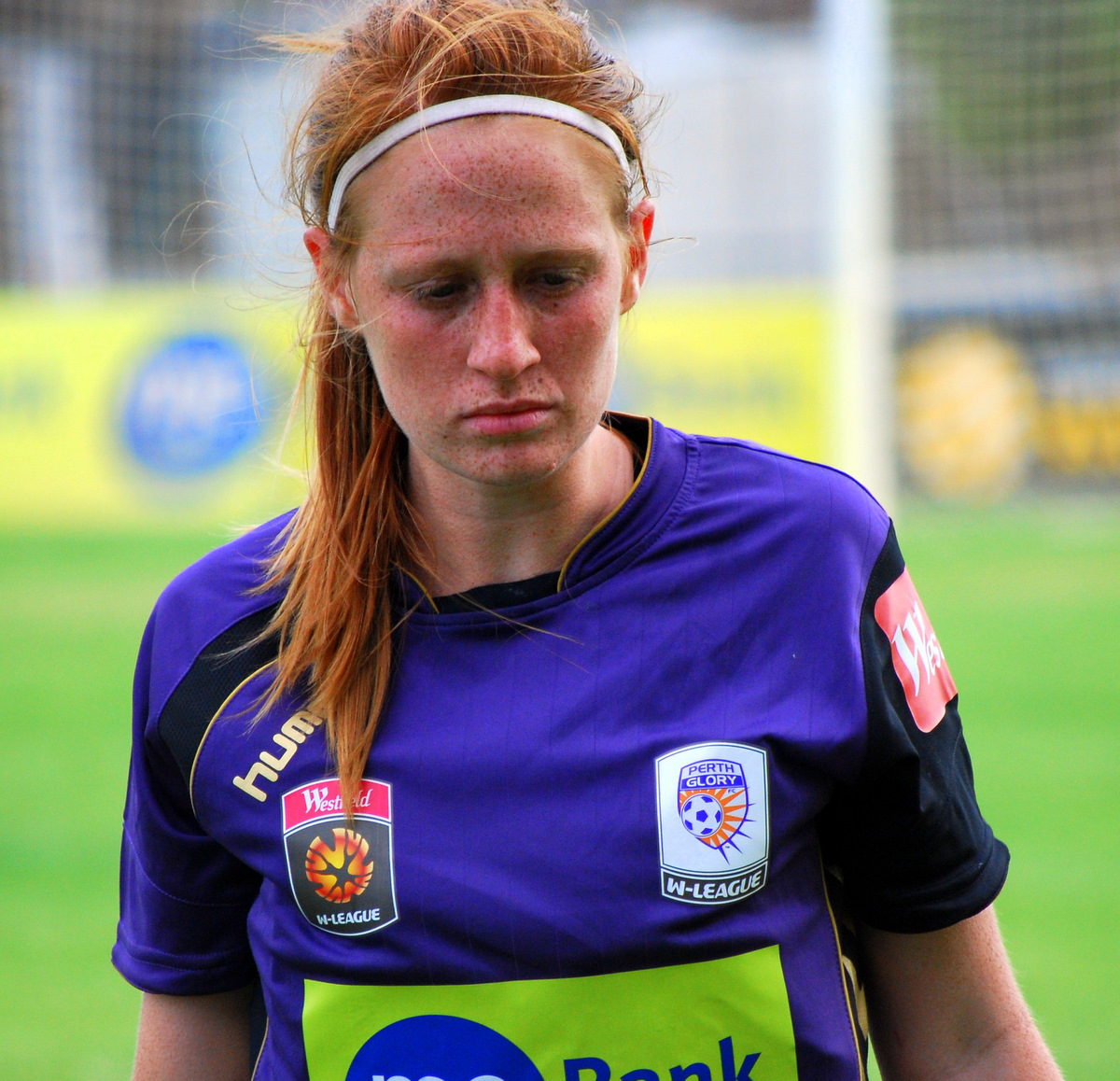
- May playing for Perth Glory in 2010

Personal information
- Date of birth: 9 June 1991 (age 35)
- Place of birth: Perth, Western Australia
- Height: 1.60 m (5 ft 3 in)
- Position: Midfielder

Youth career
- FW NTC

Senior career*
| Years | Team | Apps | (Gls) |
| 2008–2020 | Perth Glory | 112 | (2) |
- * Club domestic league appearances and goals as of 25 December 2022

Shannon May (born 9 June 1991) is an Australian soccer player who plays for Australian W-League team Perth Glory.

May was part of the Glory's inaugural W-League squad, scoring the team's first goal in their second match of the 2008–09 W-League season against Central Coast Mariners.

In December 2009, she was awarded the team's Most Glorious Player award - an award presented to the team's best player each season.

May became the first Perth Glory player to reach the 100-game mark in the W-League in 2018.

May also plays for local side Beckenham Angels SC in the Bank West Women's state League.

In November 2020, May departed Perth Glory.
