= Kendall Fletcher =

American soccer player (born 1984)

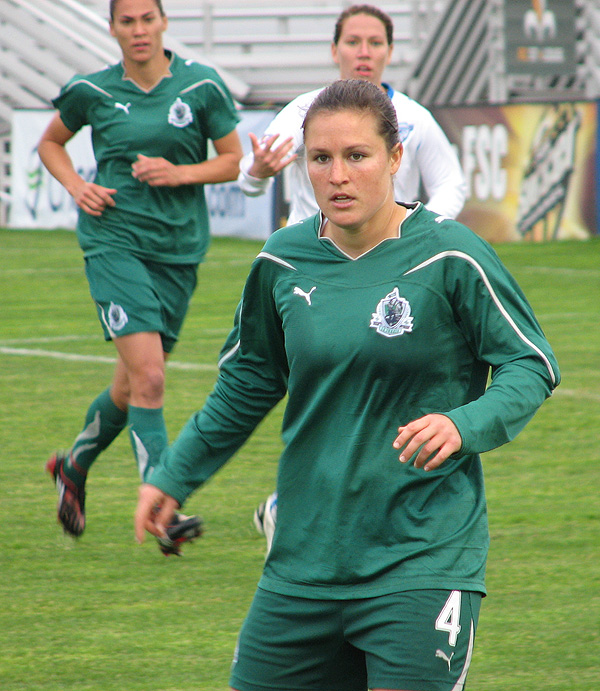
- Fletcher playing for Saint Louis Athletica in 2010

Personal information
- Full name: Kendall Lorraine Fletcher
- Date of birth: November 6, 1984 (age 42)
- Place of birth: Cary, North Carolina, United States
- Height: 5 ft 6 in (1.68 m)
- Position: Defender

College career
Years	Team	Apps	(Gls)
2002–2005	North Carolina Tar Heels	67	(8)

Senior career*
Years	Team	Apps	(Gls)
2004	Carolina Dynamo	11	(4)
2005–2006	New Jersey Wildcats	11	(2)
2007	Jersey Sky Blue		
2008	Pali Blues	11	(3)
2009	Los Angeles Sol	1	(0)
2009–2010	Saint Louis Athletica	22	(0)
2009	→ Central Coast Mariners (loan)	11	(4)
2010–2012	Sky Blue FC	30	(1)
2010–2012	Melbourne Victory	22	(4)
2012–2013	Vittsjö GIK	43	(4)
2013–2014	Canberra United	12	(1)
2014–2016	Seattle Reign FC	66	(5)
2014–2015	→ Canberra United (loan)	20	(2)
2016–2017	→ Western Sydney Wanderers (loan)	12	(2)
2017–2020	Sydney Uni SFC		
2017–2018	Canberra United	2	(0)
2020–2021	Canberra United	10	(0)
2021	North Carolina Courage	0	(0)

International career^{‡}
2001–2002	United States U-19		
- United States U-21
2009	United States	1	(0)

Managerial career
- 2006: North Carolina Tar Heels (undergrad assistant)
- 2007–2009: UC Irvine Anteaters (assistant)
- * Club domestic league appearances and goals as of February 21, 2018 ‡ National team caps and goals as of January 9, 2015

Kendall Lorraine Fletcher (born November 6, 1984) is an American professional soccer player who most recently played as a defender for North Carolina Courage of the National Women's Soccer League (NWSL).

Fletcher previously played for the Los Angeles Sol, St. Louis Athletica, and Sky Blue FC in the WPS, Vittsjo in the Swedish Damallsvenskan, Seattle Reign FC in National Women's Soccer League, and Melbourne Victory in the W-League.

A former youth and full international, Fletcher played once for the United States women's national soccer team in 2009.

== Early life ==
Born in Cary, North Carolina, to parents, Gwen and Yates Fletcher, Fletcher has one brother, Eric, and a sister, Preston. She attended Apex High School in Apex, North Carolina where she played center midfield for the soccer team for four years and played two years of varsity basketball as a point guard.

In 2002, she was ranked as the nation's sixth best high school senior by Soccer America, was a Parade and NSCAA High School All-America selection, and was named Gatorade Player of the Year. She was also named All-State in 2001 as well as All-conference and All-region in 2001 and 2002.

Fletcher played for the North Carolina Olympic Development Program (ODP) team from 1997 to 2002. She also played for several different club teams including the CASL Spartan Stars, the CASL Spartan Vipers, and the GYSA Twisters Green. She won two State Cup championships with two of the club teams.

=== University of North Carolina, 2002–2005 ===
Fletcher attended the University of North Carolina at Chapel Hill and played for the Tar Heels from 2002 to 2005. During her career, she won three ACC championships and was a starter for the 2003 NCAA-title winning team that went 27–0–0 for the season. During her freshman season, she played in 19 matches for the team after being out for part of season due to illness. She scored her first goal against the University of Washington Huskies. She returned in 2003 and started in 18 of the 25 games she played. She scored four goals and served seven assists as a defender helping the team earn a 27–0–0 record and ultimately the 2003 NCAA Division I Women's Soccer Championship – the highest accolade for collegiate sports teams in the United States. During her junior season in 2004, Fletcher started all 23 games and finished the season with three goals and five assists. She was named second-team All-Southeast Region by Soccer Buzz and third-team All-Region by the NSCAA.

== Club career ==
=== Early career ===
Fletcher signed for Jersey Sky Blue for the 2007 W-League season, but did not make an appearance for the club. She switched coasts in 2008, joining Pali Blues in Los Angeles, California as the first signing in team history.

=== Women's Professional Soccer, 2009–2012 ===
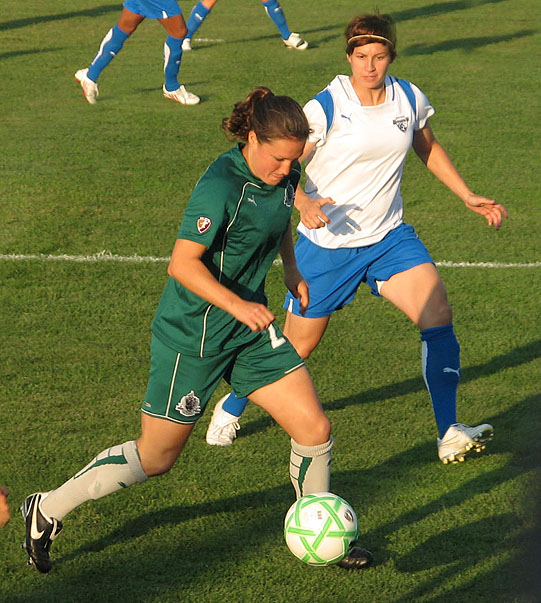
Fletcher during a game against the Boston Breakers in 2009.

She joined Los Angeles Sol in the WPS in 2009, but only played one game for the club before she was traded to Saint Louis Athletica. She played seventeen games for Athletica, and gave multiple assists in helping the team go from the bottom of the ladder to second place and the playoff semifinal. Athletica then loaned her to the Central Coast Mariners, where she scored four goals in ten games as the Mariners finished second in the league.

Athletica kept Fletcher for the 2010 WPS season, but surprisingly folded only six games into the season, all of which she started. Sky Blue FC picked up her contract and she became a regular player there as well, starting ten of the fifteen games she played with the Jersey-based club. During the off-season, she returned to Australia, this time with the Melbourne Victory – the Mariners had folded as well – and helped them to the semi-finals.

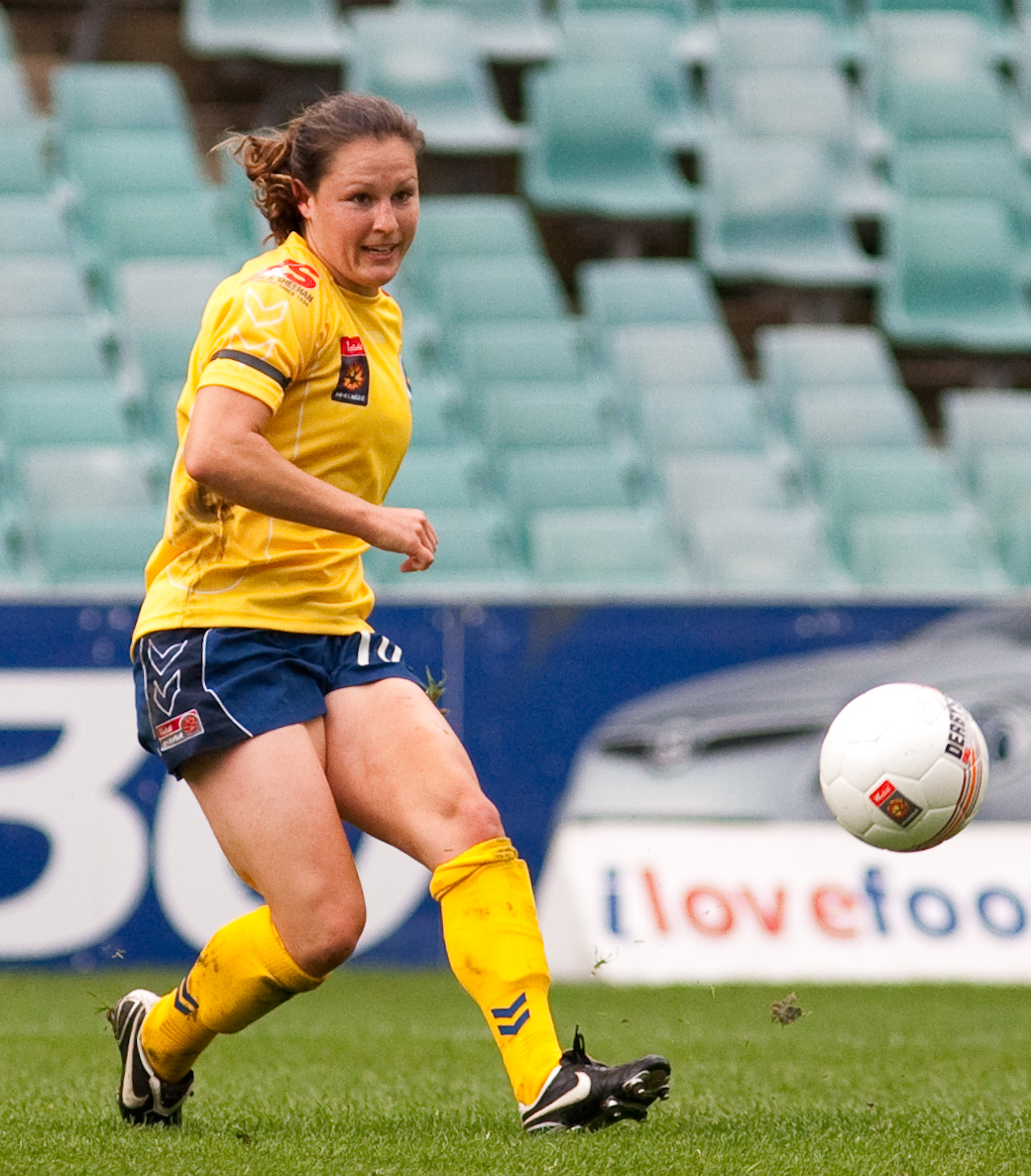
Fletcher playing for the Central Coast Mariners of the Australian W-League.

Fletcher returned to the Sky Blue FC for the 2011 WPS season, and started all 15 games that she played and scored one goal. Like the previous season, Sky Blue was just short of making the playoffs. Following the end of the season, she returned to the Melbourne Victory for the fourth season of the W-League. She played in eleven games for the Victory during the 2011-12 W-League season where the team finished fourth during regular season play.

=== Vittsjö, 2012–2013 ===
After the WPS suspended operations in 2012, Fletcher signed with Vittsjö in the Swedish Damallsvenskan where she played for the 2012 and 2013 seasons. During the 2012 season, she scored one goal and started in all 21 games that she appeared. Vittsjö finished sixth during the regular season. After returning for the 2013 season, she scored 3 goals and started in all 22 matches for the team. Vittsjö finished in eighth place.

=== Seattle Reign, 2014–2016 ===
In February 2014, Fletcher signed with Seattle Reign FC of the National Women's Soccer League for the 2014 season. Of the signing, Reign FC head coach Laura Harvey said, "Kendall adds experience and depth to our backline and potentially our midfield as well. She has proven professional experience in America, Australia and in Europe, which could prove vital for us in the coming season." Fletcher scored two goals as a defender for the team and helped them set a league record unbeaten streak of 16 games. The Reign won the league's regular season title (NWSL Shield) with a 16–5–6 record and 54 points – 13 points ahead of the second place team, FC Kansas City. Fletcher was named to the league's Best XI team after contributing to the Reign's 0.83 goals against average, scoring two goals, and serving one assist.

Following the 2015 season, Fletcher and teammate Lauren Barnes were finalists for NWSL Defender of the Year.

In January 2017, it was announced that Fletcher would not be returning to the Reign for the 2017 season after she committed to bible college in Sydney for three years.

=== Canberra United, 2017 ===
Fletcher re-joined Canberra United as a guest player (can't play more than 7 games) ahead of the 2017–18 W-League season.

== International career ==
Fletcher was a member of the United States under-19 women's national team that won the first ever under-19 World Cup in 2002. She played for the team in two Nordic Cup Championships with the under-21 national team winning the championship in 2005. She was team captain in 2006.

Fletcher was a member of the player pool for the United States women's national soccer team having trained with the team during residency in previous years. She made her first cap for the team in 2009.

== Coaching career ==
Fletcher was an assistant coach for the University of California, Irvine and University of North Carolina at Chapel Hill.

== Honors ==
North Carolina Tar Heels

- NCAA Division I women's soccer tournament: 2003

Seattle Reign FC

- NWSL Shield: 2014, 2015
