= Carys Hawkins =

Welsh footballer (born 1988)

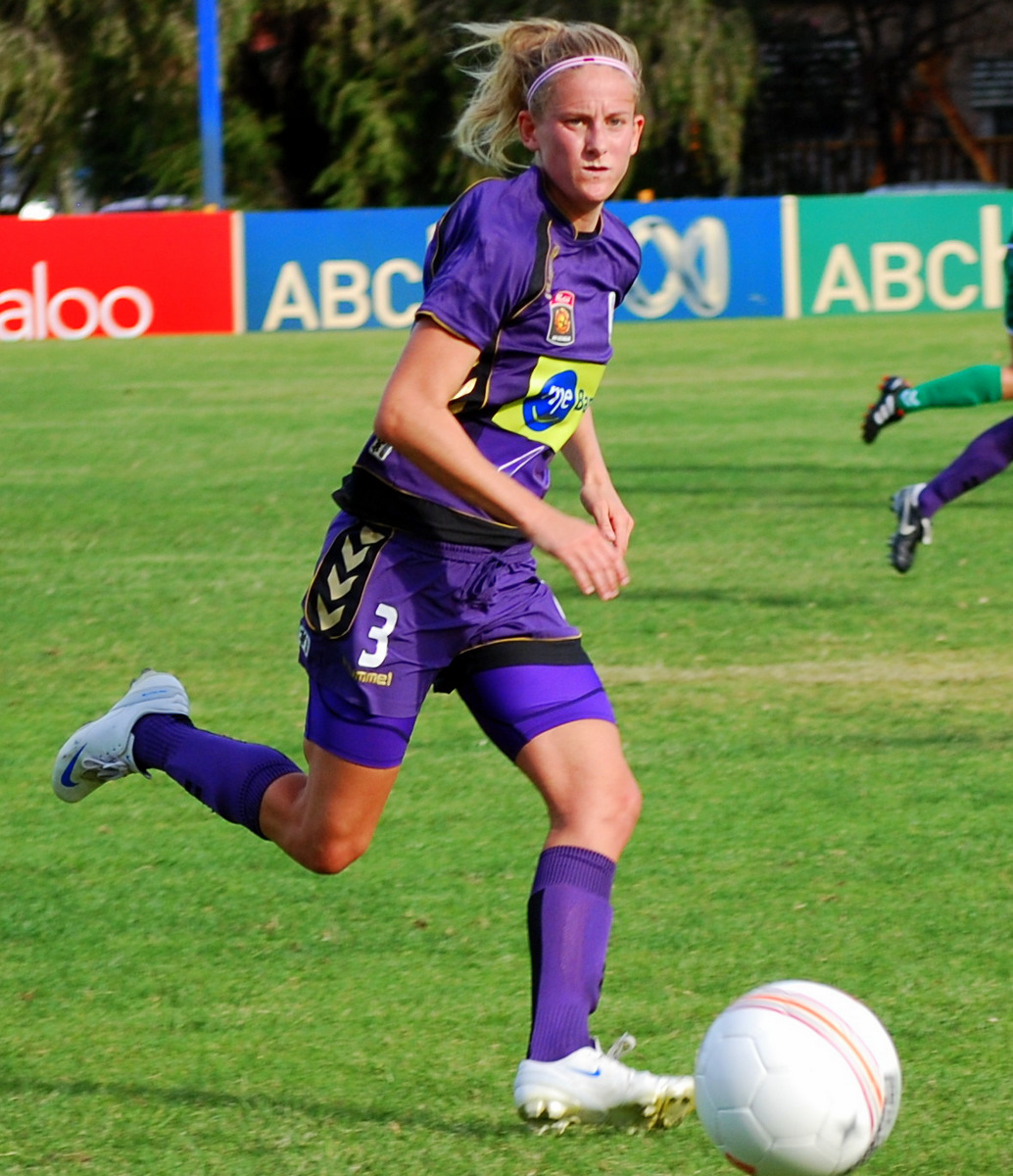
- Hawkins playing for Perth Glory in 2010

Personal information
- Date of birth: 29 August 1988 (age 38)
- Place of birth: Cardiff, Wales
- Height: 1.72 m (5 ft 8 in)
- Position: Defender

Youth career
- Northern Redbacks

Senior career*
Years	Team	Apps	(Gls)
2008–2014	Perth Glory	62	(1)
2012	Umeå Södra FF	20	(6)
2013–2014	Sunnanå SK	9	(2)
2014	Fylkir	17	(1)

International career
2013–2014	Wales	7	(0)
- * Club domestic league appearances and goals as of 16 October 2015

Carys Hawkins (born 29 August 1988) is a Welsh association football player who played for Perth Glory in the Australian W-League, Umeå Södra FF in the Swedish Elitettan, Sunnanå SK in the Swedish Damallsvenskan, and Fylkir in the Icelandic Úrvalsdeild.

== Club career ==
Hawkins starting playing football in Perth at Wembley Downs FC. As a junior she played for Northern Redbacks and won the Player of the Year and Players' Player of the Year awards in 2008.

Since the establishment of the Australian W-League in 2008, Hawkins played for Perth Glory since their inaugural season. In 2010, Hawkins was part of American college team Kentucky Wildcats. In March 2012, after 39 W-League appearances, Hawkins joined Swedish club Umeå Södra FF for the off-season. In January 2013, after returning to Perth Glory, she joined another Swedish club, Sunnanå SK. In February 2014, she returned to Perth Glory. The following month, she joined Icelandic club Fylkir who play in the Úrvalsdeild. She scored her only league goal for the club in May 2014, scoring the only goal of a 1–0 victory over ÍA. In July 2014, she also scored a goal in the Icelandic Women's Football League Cup during a 2–2 draw with Selfoss that Fylkir then lost on penalties. Hawkins later returned to Australia, and was part of Perth Glory's maiden premiership which they won in the 2014 W-League season.

== International career ==
Hawkins was part of Australian youth teams, touring New Zealand with the Australian Schoolgirls Team in 2004 and attending several camps with the Young Matildas.

In February 2013, Hawkins was called up to the senior Wales squad for the 2013 Algarve Cup. She made her debut against Mexico in the second match of the tournament. In March 2014, she was called-up for the 2015 World Cup qualifiers against Turkey and Ukraine and in August for the qualifier against England.
