= Ashley Brown (soccer) =

Australian footballer

Personal information
- Full name: Ashley Sarine Brown
- Date of birth: 4 December 1994 (age 31)
- Place of birth: Melbourne, Australia
- Height: 1.74 m (5 ft 8 1/2 in)
- Position: Forward

Senior career*
Years	Team	Apps	(Gls)
2010–2014	Melbourne Victory	25	(1)

International career
2008	Australia U17	2	(0)
2011	Australia U20	5	(1)
2012	Australia	6	(1)
- * Club domestic league appearances and goals as of 23 February 2014

Ashley Brown (born 4 December 1994) is an Australian footballer who played as a winger for Australian W-League team Melbourne Victory for 4 injury interrupted seasons. She currently plays for Ashburton United in Football Victoria's Women's Premier League where she made 2 appearances in the 2014–15 season after returning from her second ACL injury.

== Early and personal life ==
Brown was born in Australia. She has a younger brother Jordan who also played for Melbourne Victory as a midfielder. She has undertaken a personal training course and studying Bachelor of Business at Monash University where she is majoring in marketing and management.

== Playing career ==
A talented youngster who played for the South East Cougars in Football Federation Victoria's Victorian Champions League program, Brown made her senior debut for Melbourne Victory at only 16 years of age in November 2010 against Sydney FC.

Despite being a regular starter and an influential figure in the team over the next two years, Brown didn't score her first goal for the Victory until the final round of the 2011/12 regular season against Adelaide United. Having had her most impressive season to date, Brown was rewarded by winning the Westfield W-League Young Player of the Season award.

In the 2012–13 season Brown suffered a season-ending ACL injury. In her first match back for the 2013–14 season her right knee buckled in the dying stages of the game and she suffered a reoccurrence of her ACL injury, which ended her season.

=== International career ===
Having spent years playing in the youth teams of Australia, Brown made her international senior debut against New Zealand in June 2012. She quickly followed this up with her maiden international goal in a match against Haiti in the USA.

== Honours ==
=== Individual ===
- W-League Young Player of the Season: 2011–12
- Maccabi Victoria Outstanding Jewish Sportswoman of the Year 2013

== See also ==
- List of select Jewish football (association; soccer) players
