= Jodie Taylor =

English footballer (born 1986)

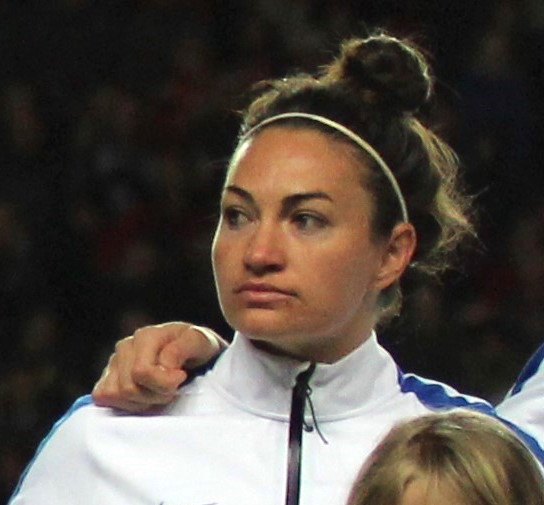
- Taylor in 2015

Personal information
- Full name: Jodie Lee Taylor
- Date of birth: 17 May 1986 (age 40)
- Place of birth: Birkenhead, Merseyside, England
- Height: 5 ft 6 in (1.68 m)
- Position: Striker

Youth career
- Tranmere Rovers

College career
| Years | Team | Apps | (Gls) |
| 2004–2007 | Oregon State Beavers | | (47) |

Senior career*
| Years | Team | Apps | (Gls) |
| 2002–2004 | Tranmere Rovers | 38 | (29) |
| 2006 | Boston Renegades | 8 | (4) |
| 2007–2008 | Ottawa Fury Women | 16 | (17) |
| 2009 | Pali Blues | 3 | (3) |
| 2010–2012 | Melbourne Victory | 21 | (12) |
| 2011–2013 | Birmingham City | 11 | (8) |
| 2011 | → Lincoln Ladies (loan) | 6 | (2) |
| 2013 | → Göteborg (loan) | 10 | (10) |
| 2013–2014 | Sydney FC | 12 | (11) |
| 2014 | Washington Spirit | 21 | (11) |
| 2015 | Portland Thorns FC | 7 | (3) |
| 2016–2017 | Arsenal | 12 | (7) |
| 2017–2018 | Melbourne City | 6 | (2) |
| 2018–2020 | Reign FC | 40 | (14) |
| 2020–2021 | Lyon | 6 | (1) |
| 2021 | Orlando Pride | 13 | (3) |
| 2022 | San Diego Wave | 14 | (1) |
| 2023 | Arsenal | 8 | (0) |

International career^{‡}
| 2014–2019 | England | 51 | (19) |

Managerial career
- 2009: Fresno State Bulldogs (assistant)
Medal record
Women's football
Representing England
FIFA Women's World Cup
| Bronze medal – third place | 2015 Canada |
- * Club domestic league appearances and goals as of 27 May 2023 ‡ National team caps and goals as of 9 November 2019

Jodie Lee Taylor (born 17 May 1986) is an English former professional footballer who played as a striker. She began her club career with local team Tranmere Rovers and had brief spells in her home country with Birmingham City and Lincoln Ladies. A well-travelled player, she has also played abroad in the United States, Canada, Australia, Sweden and France. She finished her career with Arsenal, where she has remained in an executive role.

Taylor represented England at youth level, before making her senior international debut in 2014. She played for England at three tournaments, earning the bronze medal at the 2015 FIFA Women's World Cup, and won the Golden Boot as top goalscorer at Euro 2017, scoring five goals in four appearances.

== Early life ==
Born in Birkenhead, United Kingdom, Taylor made her first team debut for Tranmere Rovers in February 2002, at the age of 15, during a prolific season in youth football. That term, she scored 109 goals across 125 games for Oldershaw School, Merseyside Under–16s and Tranmere's reserve team. She then scored on her first team debut in Tranmere's 5–1 win over Wolves in the FA Women's Cup fifth round.

When Tranmere were relegated in 2004, Taylor accepted a four-year scholarship to Oregon State University. She had scored 29 goals in 38 first team appearances for Tranmere, despite missing six months of action with a broken leg.

== Club career ==
Taylor played for various teams in the North American USL W-League and in Australia for Melbourne Victory. She returned to England in 2011, signing for Birmingham City, but moving to Lincoln Ladies on loan. After she scored two goals in six games, Lincoln wanted to keep Taylor for the 2012 FA WSL season. But she returned to her parent club Birmingham City following another off-season stint in Australia with Melbourne Victory.

At the 2012 FA Women's Cup final, Taylor scored in Birmingham's penalty shootout win over Chelsea. In January 2013, Taylor left Birmingham City for a one–year loan to Damallsvenskan team Göteborg. She scored ten goals in ten games for Göteborg but left during the summer break, returning to England for personal reasons. In December 2013, she signed with the Washington Spirit for the 2014 National Women's Soccer League season.

On 16 January 2015, the Portland Thorns FC acquired Taylor in a trade with the Washington Spirit in exchange for a 2015 second-round pick (No. 13 overall) and two-second-round picks in 2016. On 8 October 2015, defending W-League champions Canberra United announced that they had signed Taylor on loan, only for a recurrence of a knee injury to force her to pull out of the deal.

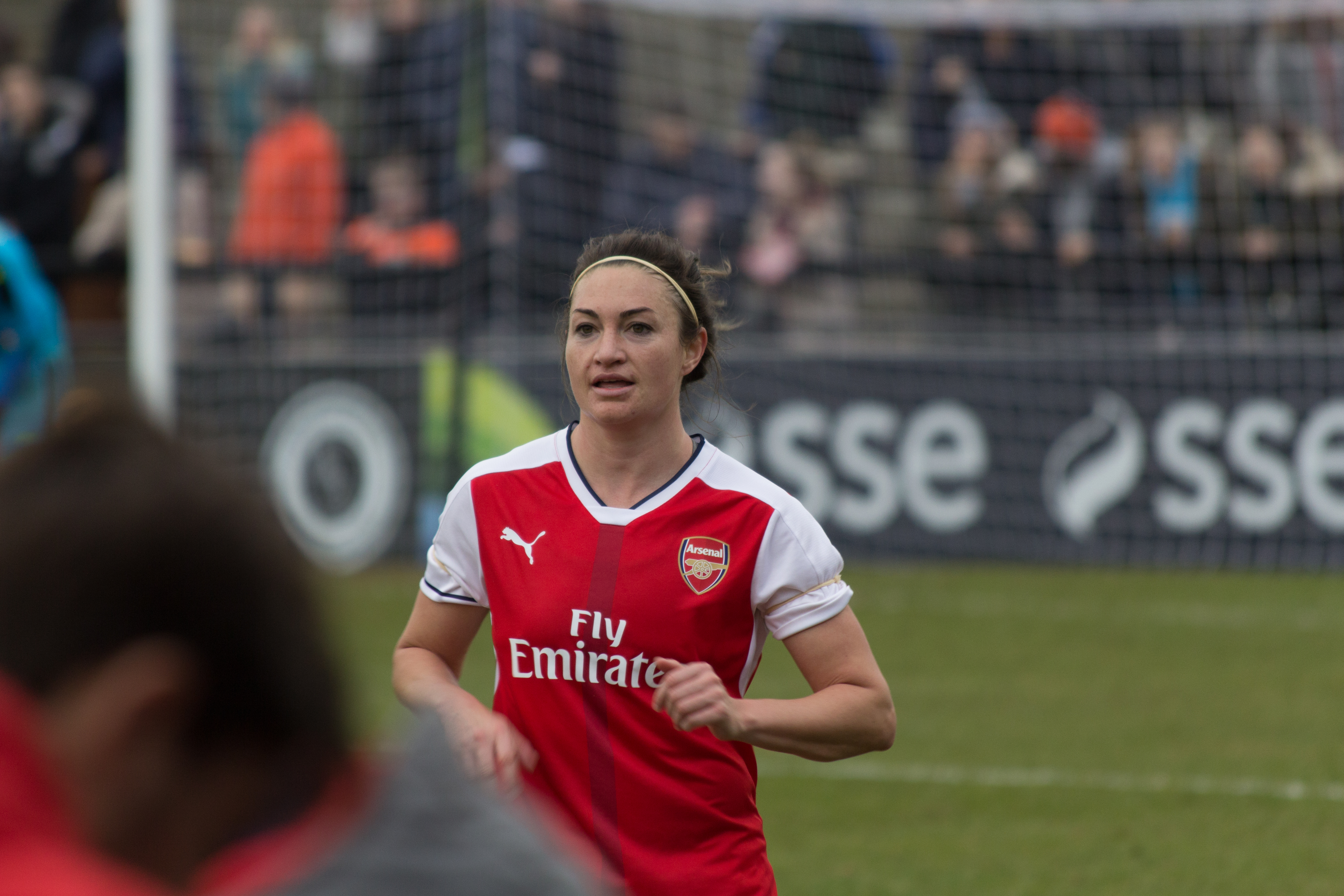
Taylor with Arsenal in 2017

On 24 March 2016, Arsenal announced the signing of Taylor. Taylor did not make her debut in the FA WSL until the club's final home game of the 2016 season, scoring twice in a 2–0 win over relegated Doncaster Belles, having previously spent a large part of the campaign out injured.

Less than two years later, Taylor left Arsenal on 21 November 2017, having played seventeen matches for the club, scoring ten goals. She signed for Melbourne City FC in Australia on a short-term contract. On the same day, Reign FC announced that Taylor would join the club before the 2018 National Women's Soccer League season. By returning to the Pacific Northwest, she joined a select group of players who have played for both sides of the Cascadia rivalry with Seattle and the Portland Thorns: Michelle Betos, Amber Brooks, Danielle Foxhoven, Kaylyn Kyle, Allie Long and Jessica McDonald. She signed a new one-year contract, with an option for a further year, with Reign FC on 22 January 2020. In December 2020, while Taylor was still in France, OL Reign traded her NWSL playing rights along with Taylor Smith to North Carolina Courage in exchange for Ally Watt. In February 2021, Taylor's NWSL rights were once again traded, this time to Orlando Pride in exchange for Carson Pickett.

On 4 August 2020, Taylor joined French and European champions Lyon on a short-term deal until 31 December. On 30 August, she appeared as an 87th minute substitute for Dzsenifer Marozsán as Lyon beat Wolfsburg 3–1 in the 2020 UEFA Women's Champions League final. In January 2021, it was announced her contract had been extended until the end of the season.

Having acquired her NWSL rights in February, Taylor signed with Orlando Pride through the end of the 2021 season on 8 July 2021.

On 1 December 2021, Taylor was traded from Orlando to San Diego Wave, a new NWSL expansion team managed by her former England teammate Casey Stoney.

On 17 March 2023, it was announced that Taylor would rejoin Arsenal for the remainder of the 2022–23 season. In Arsenal's home match against Leicester City, she assisted Frida Maanum which helped to earn Arsenal a Champions League place for the following season. She announced her retirement from competitive football on 28 September 2023

== International career ==
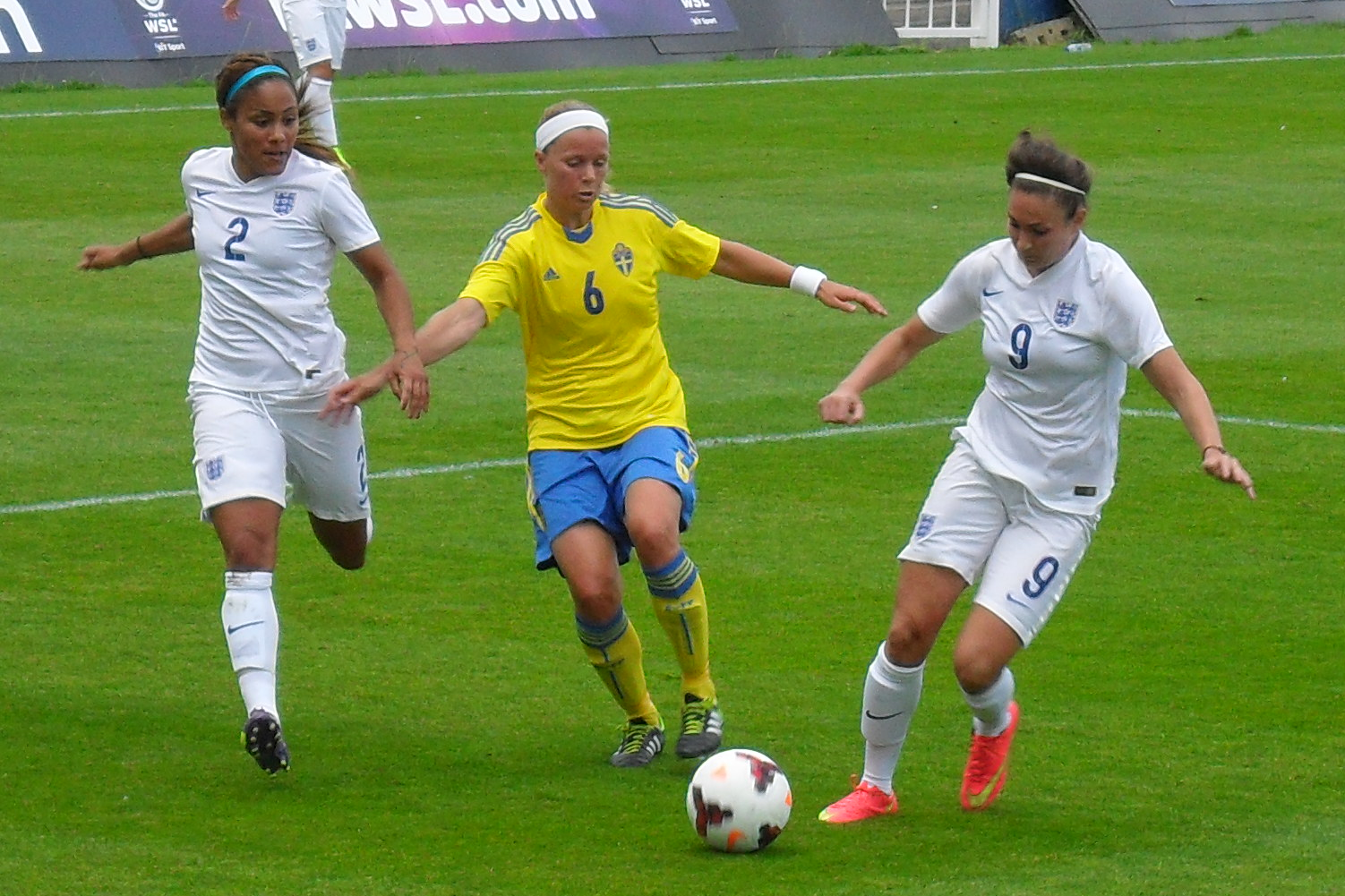
Taylor (right) in August 2014

Newly appointed England coach Mark Sampson included Taylor in a 30-player squad for the annual training camp in La Manga Club, which included a match against Norway on 17 January 2014. She withdrew from the squad due to club commitments and was replaced by Isobel Christiansen.

In August 2014, Taylor made her debut in England's 4–0 friendly win over Sweden at Victoria Park in Hartlepool. She scored what would have been her first international goal in a friendly against the United States on 13 February 2015, only for it to be wrongly ruled out for offside.

On 6 March 2015, at the 2015 Cyprus Women's Cup, Taylor scored a hat trick for England in their 3–0 group win against Australia. The win gave them a place in the finals. On her tenth appearance for England, at the 2015 FIFA Women's World Cup, Taylor capitalised on a mistake by Lauren Sesselmann of host nation Canada to put England 1–0 up in their quarter-final game. England went on to win 2–1 to secure their first ever semi-final appearance.

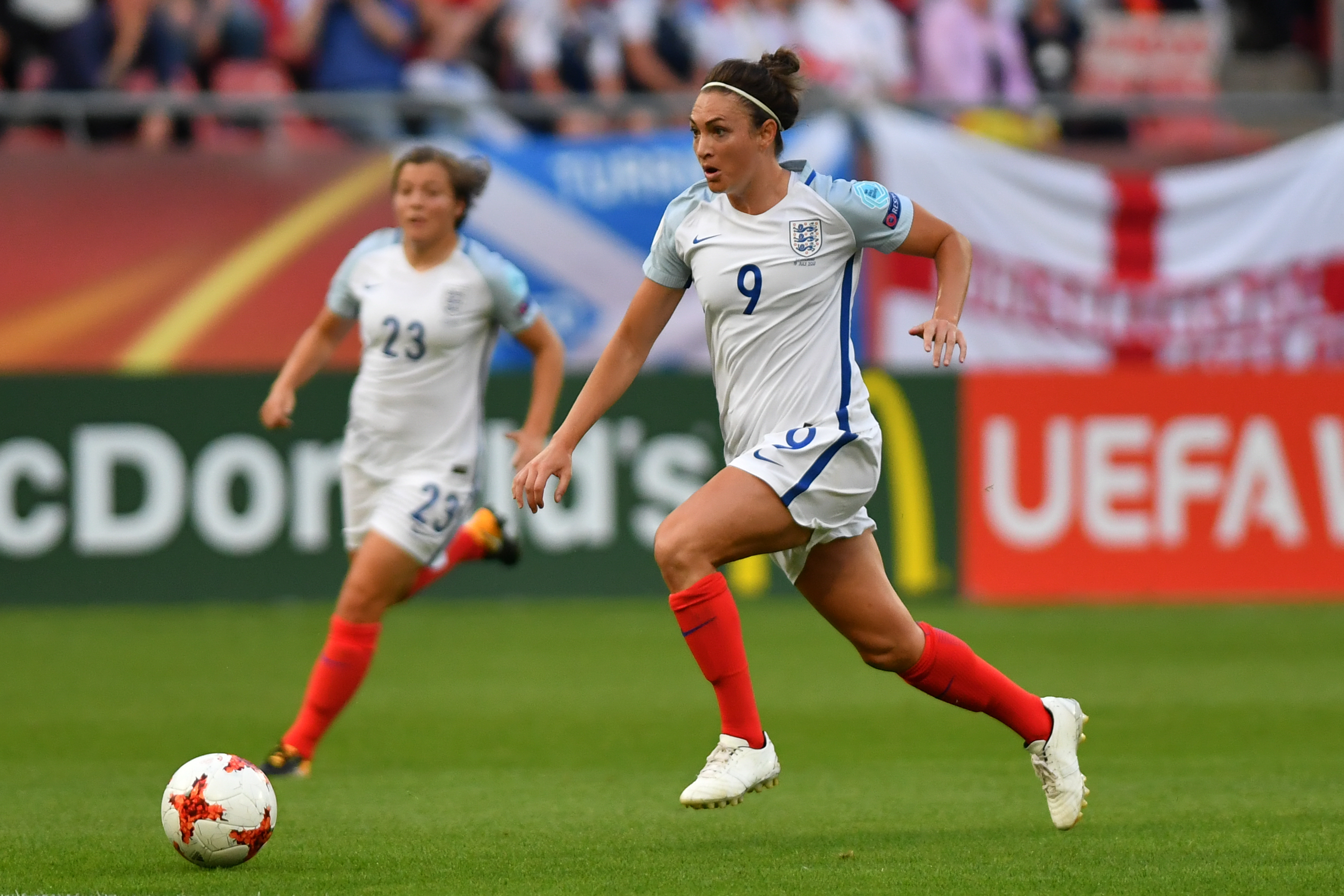
Taylor at UEFA Women's Euro 2017

Taylor was selected as part of England's squad for UEFA Women's Euro 2017 and was given the number 9 shirt for the tournament. She scored a hat-trick in the team's 6–0 opening group match victory against Scotland, becoming the first Englishwoman to do so in a major tournament. She scored again in the next game as England beat Spain 2–0 and the only goal in a 1–0 quarter-final win over France as England reached the semi-finals. With five goals, Taylor won the tournament's golden boot, one ahead of Vivianne Miedema.

In May 2019, Phil Neville selected Taylor for England's 2019 FIFA Women's World Cup squad. She made three appearances and scored once in a group stage win over Argentina.

Taylor was allotted 187 when the FA announced their legacy numbers scheme to honour the 50th anniversary of England's inaugural international.

== Post-playing career ==
On 13 November 2023, Arsenal announced that Taylor would be taking on a new role at the club as the Football Services Executive to "support the continued growth of Arsenal Women".

On 9 January 2026, Taylor was appointed as Arsenal Women's first Technical Director.

== Personal life ==
In 2019, Taylor was in a relationship with fellow footballer and New Zealand national team player Emma Kete.

== Career statistics ==
Scores and results list England's goal tally first, score column indicates score after each Taylor goal.

List of international goals scored by Jodie Taylor
| No. | Date | Venue | Opponent | Score | Result | Competition |
|---|---|---|---|---|---|---|
| 1 | 6 March 2015 | GSP Stadium, Nicosia, Cyprus | Australia | 1–0 | 3–0 | 2015 Cyprus Cup |
| 2 | 6 March 2015 | GSP Stadium, Nicosia, Cyprus | Australia | 2–0 | 3–0 | 2015 Cyprus Cup |
| 3 | 6 March 2015 | GSP Stadium, Nicosia, Cyprus | Australia | 3–0 | 3–0 | 2015 Cyprus Cup |
| 4 | 9 April 2015 | Academy Stadium, Manchester, England | China | 1–0 | 2–1 | Friendly |
| 5 | 27 June 2015 | BC Place, Vancouver, Canada | Canada | 1–0 | 2–1 | 2015 FIFA Women's World Cup |
| 6 | 29 November 2016 | Koning Willem II Stadion, Tilburg, Netherlands | Netherlands | 1–0 | 1–0 | Friendly |
| 7 | 7 April 2017 | Vale Park, Stoke-on-Trent, England | Italy | 1–0 | 1–1 | Friendly |
| 8 | 10 June 2017 | Tissot Arena, Biel, Switzerland | Switzerland | 3–0 | 4–0 | Friendly |
| 9 | 10 June 2017 | Tissot Arena, Biel, Switzerland | Switzerland | 4–0 | 4–0 | Friendly |
| 10 | 19 July 2017 | Stadion Galgenwaard, Utrecht, Netherlands | Scotland | 1–0 | 6–0 | UEFA Women's Euro 2017 |
| 11 | 19 July 2017 | Stadion Galgenwaard, Utrecht, Netherlands | Scotland | 2–0 | 6–0 | UEFA Women's Euro 2017 |
| 12 | 19 July 2017 | Stadion Galgenwaard, Utrecht, Netherlands | Scotland | 4–0 | 6–0 | UEFA Women's Euro 2017 |
| 13 | 23 July 2017 | Rat Verlegh Stadion, Breda, Netherlands | Spain | 2–0 | 2–0 | UEFA Women's Euro 2017 |
| 14 | 30 July 2017 | De Adelaarshorst, Deventer, Netherlands | France | 1–0 | 1–0 | UEFA Women's Euro 2017 |
| 15 | 19 September 2017 | Prenton Park, Birkenhead, England | Russia | 2–0 | 6–0 | 2019 Women's World Cup Qualifying |
| 16 | 1 March 2018 | Mapfre Stadium, Columbus, Ohio, United States | France | 3–0 | 4–1 | 2018 SheBelieves Cup |
| 17 | 10 April 2018 | Sarajevo, Bosnia and Herzegovina | Bosnia and Herzegovina | 2–0 | 2–0 | 2019 Women's World Cup Qualifying |
| 18 | 14 June 2019 | Stade Océane, Le Havre, France | Argentina | 1-0 | 1–0 | 2019 Women's World Cup |
| 19 | 29 August 2019 | Den Dreef, Heverlee, Belgium | Belgium | 1–0 | 3–3 | Friendly |

== Honours ==
Birmingham City

- FA Cup: 2012

Göteborg

- Svenska Supercupen: 2013

Melbourne City

- W-League Championship: 2018

Lyon

- UEFA Women's Champions League: 2019–20

England

- FIFA Women's World Cup third place: 2015
- SheBelieves Cup: 2019

Individual

- UEFA Women's Championship Golden Boot: 2017
- England Women's Player of the Year: 2017

== See also ==
- List of England national football team hat-tricks
- List of foreign NWSL players
- List of foreign Damallsvenskan players
- List of foreign Division 1 Féminine players
- List of foreign W-League (Australia) players
- List of Melbourne Victory FC (women) players
- A-League Women records and statistics
- List of UEFA Women's Championship records
