= Elisa D'Ovidio =

Australian soccer player

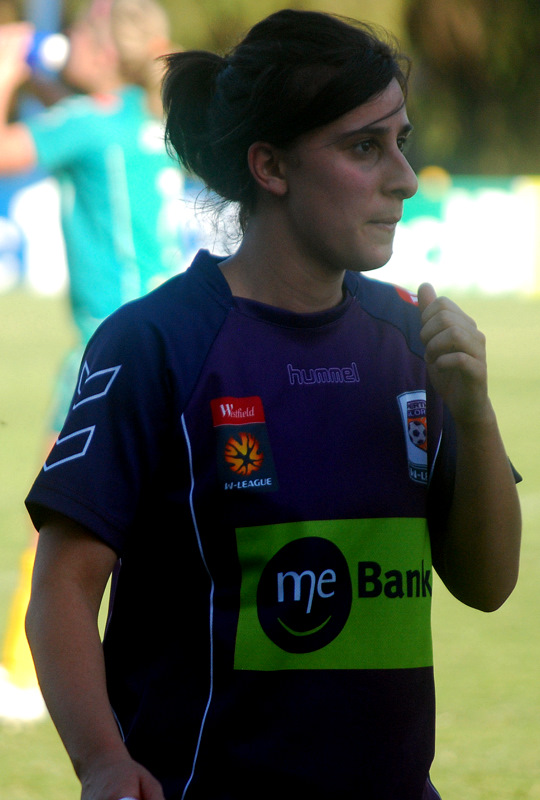
- D'Ovidio playing for Perth Glory in 2009

Personal information
- Full name: Elisa D'Ovidio
- Date of birth: 24 February 1989 (age 37)
- Place of birth: Perth, Western Australia
- Height: 1.59 m (5 ft 3 in)
- Position: Attacking midfielder

Youth career
- FW NTC

Senior career*
Years	Team	Apps	(Gls)
2008–2015	Perth Glory	76	(12)
- * Club domestic league appearances and goals as of 16 October 2015

Elisa D'Ovidio (born 24 February 1989) is an Australian soccer player who last played for Australian W-League team Perth Glory between 2008 and 2015.

In 2006, D'Ovidio was adjudged the "Fairest and Best" player in the Football West Women's Premier League.

In 2016, she was selected as assistant Coach of the Western Australian Women's State Team for a match against Perth Glory Women.
