= W-League transfers for 2013–14 season =

This is a list of Australian soccer transfers for the 2013–14 W-League. Only moves featuring at least one W-League club are listed.

== Transfers ==
All players without a flag are Australian. Clubs without a flag are clubs participating in the W-League. All transfers between W-League clubs include a free transfer period in the off-season since prior to the 2017–18 season, the W-League didn't have multi-year contracts.

=== Pre-season ===
Date	Name	Moving from	Moving to
13 December 2012	(Sweden) Louise Fors	Western Sydney Wanderers	(England) Liverpool
12 January 2013	(Iceland) Þóra Björg Helgadóttir	Western Sydney Wanderers	(Sweden) Malmö (end of loan)
23 January 2013	(United States) Jessica McDonald	Melbourne Victory	Unattached
23 January 2013	(United States) Danielle Johnson	Melbourne Victory	(United States) Bay Area Breeze
6 February 2013	Alexandra Huynh	Western Sydney Wanderers	(United States) Colorado Buffaloes
13 February 2013	(United States) Kristie Mewis	Canberra United	(United States) Kansas City
14 August 2013	Meg McLaughlin	Sydney FC	Canberra United
14 August 2013	Hayley Raso	Canberra United	Brisbane Roar
23 August 2013	Melissa Barbieri	(Australia) Box Hill United	Adelaide United
3 September 2013	(United States) Lori Lindsey	(United States) Washington Spirit	Canberra United
11 September 2013	(United States) Stephanie Ochs	(United States) Washington Spirit	Canberra United
11 September 2013	(England) Carly Telford	Perth Glory	(England) Chelsea (end of loan)
11 September 2013	Casey Dumont	Unattached	Sydney FC
19 September 2013	(England) Laura Stockdale	(United States) Los Angeles Strikers	Adelaide United
19 September 2013	Sarah Walsh	Western Sydney Wanderers	Retired
24 September 2013	Kyah Simon (Note: K. Simon spent the off-season at Boston Breakers.)	Sydney FC	Western Sydney Wanderers
24 September 2013	Larissa Crummer	Sydney FC	Brisbane Roar
24 September 2013	(Germany) Nadine Angerer	(Germany) 1. FFC Frankfurt	Brisbane Roar
24 September 2013	Sunny Franco	(Australia) QAS	Brisbane Roar
24 September 2013	Brooke Goodrich	(Australia) QAS	Brisbane Roar
24 September 2013	Ayesha Norrie	(Australia) QAS	Brisbane Roar
24 September 2013	Natasha Wheeler	(Australia) QAS	Brisbane Roar
24 September 2013	Joanne Burgess	Unattached	Brisbane Roar
24 September 2013	Kim Carroll	Unattached	Brisbane Roar
26 September 2013	Alanna Kennedy	Sydney FC	Western Sydney Wanderers
26 September 2013	(England) Jodie Taylor	(England) Birmingham City	Sydney FC
26 September 2013	Alesha Clifford	Western Sydney Wanderers	Sydney FC
26 September 2013	Trudy Camilleri	Western Sydney Wanderers	Sydney FC
2 October 2013	(United States) Kendall Fletcher	(Sweden) Vittsjö	Canberra United
6 October 2013	(Canada) Christina Julien	(Russia) Rossiyanka	Perth Glory
9 October 2013	Holly Houston	Unattached	Canberra United
9 October 2013	(Germany) Ariane Hingst	Canberra United	Unattached
9 October 2013	Christine Walters	Canberra United	Unattached
9 October 2013	Sammie Wood	Canberra United	(Australia) Canberra FC
9 October 2013	(Denmark) Cecilie Sandvej	(Denmark) Brøndby	Perth Glory
10 October 2013	Lisa De Vanna (Note: De Vanna spent the off-season at Sky Blue.)	Perth Glory	Melbourne Victory
10 October 2013	Emma Checker	Adelaide United	Melbourne Victory
10 October 2013	Emily van Egmond (Note: van Egmond spent the off-season at Seattle Reign.)	Newcastle Jets	Western Sydney Wanderers
10 October 2013	Heather Garriock	Unattached	Western Sydney Wanderers
10 October 2013	Mackenzie Arnold	Canberra United	Western Sydney Wanderers
10 October 2013	Michelle Carney	(Australia) Illawarra Stingrays	Western Sydney Wanderers
10 October 2013	Caitlin Cooper	Canberra United	Western Sydney Wanderers
10 October 2013	(United States) Tori Huster (Note: Huster joined Washington Spirit before being loaned to Western Sydney Wanderers.)	Newcastle Jets	Western Sydney Wanderers
10 October 2013	(United States) Shawna Gordon	(United States) Boston Breakers	Western Sydney Wanderers
11 October 2013	(Sweden) Petra Larsson	Melbourne Victory	(Sweden) Linköping (end of loan)
11 October 2013	Beattie Goad	(Australia) EAP	Melbourne Victory
11 October 2013	(New Zealand) Katie Hoyle	(New Zealand) Eastern Suburbs	Melbourne Victory
11 October 2013	Emily Hulbert	(Australia) Box Hill United	Melbourne Victory
11 October 2013	Alex Natoli	Adelaide United	Melbourne Victory
11 October 2013	(Sweden) Jessica Samuelsson	(Sweden) Linköping	Melbourne Victory (loan)
15 October 2013	Libby Copus-Brown	Emerging Jets	Newcastle Jets
15 October 2013	Adriana Jones	Emerging Jets	Newcastle Jets
15 October 2013	Sophie Nenadovic	Emerging Jets	Newcastle Jets
15 October 2013	(England) Hannah Beard	Brisbane Roar	Newcastle Jets
15 October 2013	Lauren Brown	Brisbane Roar	Newcastle Jets
15 October 2013	Ashley Spina	Brisbane Roar	Newcastle Jets
15 October 2013	Siahn Bozanic	(Australia) Northbridge FC	Newcastle Jets
15 October 2013	Rhali Dobson	(Australia) Merewether United	Newcastle Jets
15 October 2013	Cassidy Davis	(Australia) Lake Macquarie City	Newcastle Jets
15 October 2013	Ainsley Buchanan	(Australia) Merewether United	Newcastle Jets
19 October 2013	Claire Coelho	Unattached	Newcastle Jets
24 October 2013	(United States) Chantel Jones	(United States) Washington Spirit	Perth Glory
24 October 2013	Jessica Dillon	(Australia) The Gap	Perth Glory
24 October 2013	Amy Knights	(Australia) Northern Redbacks	Perth Glory
24 October 2013	Kathleen Waycott	(Australia) Northern Redbacks	Perth Glory
29 October 2013	Jaymee Gibbons	Perth Glory	Unattached
29 October 2013	(New Zealand) Elizabeth Milne	Perth Glory	Unattached
29 October 2013	(Wales) Carys Hawkins	Perth Glory	(Sweden) Sunnanå
30 October 2013	Lydia Williams	(Sweden) Piteå	Canberra United
30 October 2013	Rachel Alonso	Melbourne Victory	Unattached
30 October 2013	Louisa Bisby	Melbourne Victory	Unattached
30 October 2013	Amy Jackson	Melbourne Victory	Unattached
30 October 2013	Georgia Koutrouvelis	Melbourne Victory	(Australia) Box Hill United
30 October 2013	Maika Ruyter-Hooley	Melbourne Victory	Unattached
30 October 2013	Jackie Vogt	Melbourne Victory	Unattached
1 November 2013	Sneź Veljanovska	Canberra United	Unattached
2 November 2013	Lana Harch	Brisbane Roar	Retired
3 November 2013	(New Zealand) Abby Erceg	Adelaide United	(Germany) FF USV Jena
3 November 2013	Kristi Harvey	Adelaide United	(Australia) Metro United
3 November 2013	Grace Henry	Adelaide United	(Australia) Sydney University
3 November 2013	Laura Johns	Adelaide United	(Australia) Adelaide University
3 November 2013	Georgia Macri	Adelaide United	(Australia) Fulham United
3 November 2013	Lorena Maggio	Adelaide United	Unattached
3 November 2013	Ann Mayo	Adelaide United	(Australia) Tuggeranong United
3 November 2013	(New Zealand) Sarah McLaughlin	Adelaide United	(New Zealand) Claudelands Rovers
3 November 2013	(New Zealand) Holly Patterson	Adelaide United	(United States) Dartmouth Big Green
3 November 2013	Marijana Rajcic	Adelaide United	(Australia) Box Hill United
3 November 2013	Cassie Tsoumbris	Adelaide United	(Australia) Fulham United
3 November 2013	Ruth Wallace	Adelaide United	Unattached
3 November 2013	Elise Whorlow	Adelaide United	Unattached
3 November 2013	Jayah Brown	(Australia) QAS	Adelaide United
3 November 2013	Emily Condon	(Australia) FFSA NTC	Adelaide United
3 November 2013	Bianca Gray	(Australia) Sturt Marion	Adelaide United
3 November 2013	Alexandra Gummer	(Australia) Casey Comets	Adelaide United
3 November 2013	Isabel Hodgson	(Australia) Fulham United	Adelaide United
3 November 2013	Monique Iannella	(Australia) Adelaide City	Adelaide United
3 November 2013	Jessica Nagel	(Australia) Adelaide City	Adelaide United
3 November 2013	Tiarn Powell	(Australia) Manly United	Adelaide United
3 November 2013	Tegan Riding	(Australia) Redlands United	Adelaide United
3 November 2013	Daila Tais-Borg	(Australia) North West Koalas	Adelaide United
7 November 2013	Rebecca Price	Brisbane Roar	(Australia) The Gap
7 November 2013	(Japan) Sachiko Tatsuoka	Brisbane Roar	(Australia) Redlands United
7 November 2013	Emma Pittman	Brisbane Roar	(Australia) The Gap
7 November 2013	Joanne Buckley	Brisbane Roar	(Australia) Redlands United
7 November 2013	(Japan) Hoshimi Kishi	Brisbane Roar	Unattached
7 November 2013	Georgia Chapman	Brisbane Roar	Unattached
7 November 2013	Hayley Crawford	Newcastle Jets	Retired
7 November 2013	(United States) Angela Salem	Newcastle Jets	(United States) Western New York Flash
7 November 2013	(United States) Tiffany Boshers	Newcastle Jets	Unattached
7 November 2013	Sammara Schmitzer	Newcastle Jets	(Australia) Football Mid North Coast
7 November 2013	Gemma Pearce	Newcastle Jets	(Australia) Lake Macquarie City
7 November 2013	Alisha Foote	Newcastle Jets	(Australia) Redlands United
7 November 2013	Kate Hensman	Newcastle Jets	(Australia) Lake Macquarie City
7 November 2013	Bronte Bates	Newcastle Jets	Unattached
7 November 2013	Mikaela Howell	Newcastle Jets	Unattached
7 November 2013	Michaela Hatzirodos	Newcastle Jets	Unattached
7 November 2013	Alannah Rosewood	Newcastle Jets	Unattached
7 November 2013	Britney Whitfield	Sydney FC	Unattached
7 November 2013	Sian McLaren	Sydney FC	(Australia) Sydney University
7 November 2013	(New Zealand) Annalie Longo	Sydney FC	(New Zealand) Mainland Pride
7 November 2013	(New Zealand) Hannah Bromley	Sydney FC	(Australia) Northbridge FC
7 November 2013	Melissa Caceres	(Australia) Marconi Stallions	Sydney FC
7 November 2013	Dimi Poulos	Unattached	Western Sydney Wanderers
7 November 2013	(England) Lizzie Durack	Western Sydney Wanderers	(England) Everton
7 November 2013	Vanessa Hart	Western Sydney Wanderers	Unattached
7 November 2013	Candace Sciberras	Western Sydney Wanderers	(United States) Wyoming Cowgirls
8 November 2013	Jordan Baker	(Australia) Illawarra Stingrays	Western Sydney Wanderers

=== Mid-season ===
Date	Name	Moving from	Moving to
15 November 2013	(Norway) Lisa-Marie Woods	Unattached	Adelaide United
28 November 2013	(Republic of Ireland) Ciara McCormack	Unattached	Newcastle Jets
28 November 2013	Renee Tomkins	(Australia) Marconi Stallions	Western Sydney Wanderers
29 November 2013	Sneź Veljanovska	Unattached	Adelaide United
29 November 2013	Daniela Di Bartolo	(Australia) Adelaide City	Adelaide United
30 November 2013	(New Zealand) Anna Green	Unattached	Sydney FC
30 November 2013	(United States) Camille Levin	(Sweden) Kopparberg/Göteborg	Western Sydney Wanderers
19 December 2013	Emily Henderson	(Australia) Football West NTC	Perth Glory
22 December 2013	Clare Wheeler	Emerging Jets	Newcastle Jets
2 January 2014	Gabrielle Dal Busco	(Australia) Football West NTC	Perth Glory
10 January 2014	Teagan Micah	Unattached	Brisbane Roar
17 January 2014	(United States) Lauren Barnes	(United States) Seattle Reign	Melbourne Victory (loan)
19 January 2014	Teagan Micah	Brisbane Roar	Unattached
23 January 2014	(Scotland) Louise Mason	Unattached	Adelaide United
28 January 2014	Maika Ruyter-Hooley	Unattached	Melbourne Victory
30 January 2014 (Note: Player was released to free agency before joining new club)	Ella Mastrantonio	Perth Glory	Melbourne Victory
1 February 2014	(Wales) Carys Hawkins	(Sweden) Sunnanå	Perth Glory

== Re-signings ==
Date	Name	Club
4 September 2013	Danielle Brogan	Sydney FC
4 September 2013	Leena Khamis	Sydney FC
10 September 2013	(Wales) Jess Fishlock (Note: Fishlock spent the off-season at her parent club Seattle Reign and on loan at Glasgow City.)	Melbourne Victory
19 September 2013	(England) Kristy Moore	Adelaide United
19 September 2013	(Canada) Sasha Andrews	Perth Glory
19 September 2013	Amy Harrison	Sydney FC
19 September 2013	Sham Khamis	Sydney FC
19 September 2013	Chloe Logarzo	Sydney FC
19 September 2013	Natalie Tobin	Sydney FC
19 September 2013	Catherine Cannuli	Western Sydney Wanderers
24 September 2013	Clare Polkinghorne	Brisbane Roar
24 September 2013	Elise Kellond-Knight	Brisbane Roar
24 September 2013	Laura Alleway	Brisbane Roar
24 September 2013	Tameka Butt	Brisbane Roar
24 September 2013	Amy Chapman	Brisbane Roar
24 September 2013	Erika Elze	Brisbane Roar
24 September 2013	Emily Gielnik	Brisbane Roar
24 September 2013	Katrina Gorry	Brisbane Roar
24 September 2013	Vedrana Popovic	Brisbane Roar
24 September 2013	Brooke Spence	Brisbane Roar
24 September 2013	Kate Stewart	Brisbane Roar
26 September 2013	Sam Kerr	Sydney FC
26 September 2013	Ellyse Perry	Sydney FC
26 September 2013	Caitlin Foord (Note: Foord joined Sky Blue and was loaned back to Sydney FC.)	Sydney FC
26 September 2013	Elizabeth Ralston	Sydney FC
26 September 2013	Renee Rollason	Sydney FC
26 September 2013	Teresa Polias	Sydney FC
26 September 2013	Nicola Bolger	Sydney FC
26 September 2013	(New Zealand) Emma Kete (Note: Kete spent the off-season at Bad Neuenahr.)	Sydney FC
9 October 2013	Caitlin Munoz	Canberra United
9 October 2013	Ellie Brush (Note: Brush spent the off-season at Avaldsnes.)	Canberra United
9 October 2013	Grace Gill (Note: Gill spent the off-season at Slovácko.)	Canberra United
9 October 2013	Nicole Sykes (Note: N. Sykes spent the off-season at Kristianstad.)	Canberra United
9 October 2013	Ashleigh Sykes	Canberra United
9 October 2013	Jennifer Bisset (Note: Bisset spent the off-season at PK-35 Vantaa.)	Canberra United
9 October 2013	Catherine Brown	Canberra United
9 October 2013	Georgia Yeoman-Dale	Canberra United
9 October 2013	Grace Field	Canberra United
9 October 2013	Michelle Heyman	Canberra United
9 October 2013	Sally Rojahn	Canberra United
9 October 2013	Sally Shipard	Canberra United
9 October 2013	Trudy Burke	Canberra United
10 October 2013	Jenna Kingsley	Western Sydney Wanderers
10 October 2013	Teigen Allen	Western Sydney Wanderers
10 October 2013	Linda O'Neill	Western Sydney Wanderers
10 October 2013	Georgia Rowntree	Western Sydney Wanderers
10 October 2013	Jessica Seaman	Western Sydney Wanderers
10 October 2013	Rachael Soutar	Western Sydney Wanderers
10 October 2013	Samantha Spackman	Western Sydney Wanderers
10 October 2013	Servet Uzunlar	Western Sydney Wanderers
11 October 2013	Enza Barilla (Note: Barilla spent the off-season at Bundoora United.)	Melbourne Victory
11 October 2013	Ashley Brown	Melbourne Victory
11 October 2013	Steph Catley (Note: Catley spent the off-season at Sandringham SC.)	Melbourne Victory
11 October 2013	Brianna Davey (Note: Davey spent the off-season on loan at Linköping.)	Melbourne Victory
11 October 2013	Cassandra Dimovski (Note: Dimovski spent the off-season at South Melbourne.)	Melbourne Victory
11 October 2013	Tiffany Eliadis (Note: Eliadis spent the off-season at South Melbourne.)	Melbourne Victory
11 October 2013	Caitlin Friend (Note: Friend spent the off-season at Bundoora United.)	Melbourne Victory
11 October 2013	Jessica Humble (Note: Humble spent the off-season at Box Hill United.)	Melbourne Victory
11 October 2013	(Turkey) Gülcan Koca (Note: Koca spent the off-season at Bundoora United.)	Melbourne Victory
11 October 2013	Cindy Lay	Melbourne Victory
11 October 2013	Laura Spiranovic (Note: Spiranovic spent the off-season at South Melbourne.)	Melbourne Victory
15 October 2013	Gema Simon	Newcastle Jets
15 October 2013	Hannah Brewer	Newcastle Jets
15 October 2013	Eliza Campbell	Newcastle Jets
15 October 2013	(England) Stacey Day	Newcastle Jets
15 October 2013	Madeline Searl	Newcastle Jets
15 October 2013	Tara Andrews	Newcastle Jets
15 October 2013	Grace Macintyre	Newcastle Jets
15 October 2013	Jasmin Courtenay	Newcastle Jets
24 October 2013	Collette McCallum	Perth Glory
24 October 2013	Kate Gill	Perth Glory
24 October 2013	Marianna Tabain	Perth Glory
24 October 2013	Shannon May	Perth Glory
24 October 2013	Ella Mastrantonio	Perth Glory
24 October 2013	Sarah Carroll	Perth Glory
24 October 2013	Aivi Luik	Perth Glory
24 October 2013	Bronwyn Studman	Perth Glory
24 October 2013	Rosie Sutton (Note: Sutton spent the off-season at ÍBV.)	Perth Glory
24 October 2013	Elisa D'Ovidio	Perth Glory
24 October 2013	Thia Eastman	Perth Glory
24 October 2013	Shawn Billam	Perth Glory
3 November 2013	Kelly Barltrop	Adelaide United
3 November 2013	Jenna McCormick	Adelaide United
3 November 2013	Racheal Quigley (Note: Quigley spent the off-season at Kansas City Shock.)	Adelaide United
3 November 2013	Jessica Waterhouse	Adelaide United
3 November 2013	Jessie Wharepouri	Adelaide United
7 November 2013	Helen Petinos	Western Sydney Wanderers
16 December 2013	Melissa Maizels	Melbourne Victory
