= 2014 Western Sydney Wanderers FC (women) season =

Western Sydney Wanderers WFC
2014 season
- Chairman: Lyall Gorman
- Manager: Norm Boardman
- Stadium: Marconi Stadium
- W-League: 8th
- Top goalscorer: Keelin Winters (5)
| Home colours | Away colours |

The 2014 Western Sydney Wanderers FC W-League season was the club's third participation in the W-League, since the club's formation in 2012.

== Players ==
=== Squad information ===
Note: Flags indicate national team as defined under FIFA eligibility rules; some limited exceptions apply. Players may hold more than one non-FIFA nationality.

| No. | Pos. | Nation | Player |
|---|---|---|---|
| 1 | GK | AUS | Trudy Burke |
| 2 | DF | AUS | Caitlin Cooper (Captain) |
| 3 | DF | AUS | Jessica Seaman |
| 4 | MF | AUS | Caitlin Jarvie |
| 5 | FW | AUS | Helen Petinos |
| 6 | DF | AUS | Rachael Soutar |
| 8 | DF | AUS | Grace Henry |
| 9 | MF | USA | Keelin Winters (on loan from Seattle Reign FC) |
| 10 | FW | AUS | Michelle Carney |
| 11 | MF | AUS | Lorena Bugden |

| No. | Pos. | Nation | Player |
|---|---|---|---|
| 12 | FW | ENG | Hannah Beard |
| 13 | FW | AUS | Jordan Baker |
| 14 | MF | AUS | Demi Koulizakis |
| 15 | FW | AUS | Rhianna Pollicina |
| 16 | MF | AUS | Linda O'Neill |
| 18 | FW | AUS | Tia Gavin |
| 19 | MF | AUS | Chloe O'Brien |
| 20 | GK | AUS | Sham Khamis |
| 22 | DF | AUS | Victoria Guzman |
| — | DF | USA | Kendall Johnson |

=== Transfers in ===
Note: Flags indicate national team as defined under FIFA eligibility rules; some limited exceptions apply. Players may hold more than one non-FIFA nationality.

| No. | Pos. | Nation | Player |
|---|---|---|---|
| 1 | GK | AUS | Trudy Burke (from (Australia) Canberra United) |
| 15 | FW | AUS | Rhianna Pollicina (from (Australia) FNSW Institute) |
| 22 | DF | AUS | Victoria Guzman (from (Australia) FNSW Institute) |
| 19 | DF | AUS | Chloe O'Brien (from (Australia) FNSW Institute) |
| 18 | MF | AUS | Tia Gavin (from (Australia) FNSW Institute) |
| 8 | MF | AUS | Grace Henry (from (Australia) Adelaide United Youth) |
| 14 | MF | AUS | Demi Koulizakis (from (Australia) FNSW Institute) |
| 20 | GK | AUS | Sham Khamis (from (Australia) Sydney FC) |
| 11 | MF | AUS | Lorena Bugden (from (Australia) FNSW Institute) |
| 4 | MF | AUS | Caitlin Jarvie (from (Australia) Northbridge FC) |
| 12 | FW | ENG | Hannah Beard (from (Australia) Newcastle Jets) |
| 9 | MF | USA | Keelin Winters (on loan from (United States) Seattle Reign FC) |
| — | DF | USA | Kendall Johnson (from (United States) Sky Blue FC) |

=== Transfers out ===
Note: Flags indicate national team as defined under FIFA eligibility rules; some limited exceptions apply. Players may hold more than one non-FIFA nationality.

| No. | Pos. | Nation | Player |
|---|---|---|---|
| 1 | GK | AUS | Mackenzie Arnold (to (Australia) Perth Glory) |
| 3 | MF | USA | Shawna Gordon (to (Sweden) Umeå IK) |
| 4 | DF | USA | Camille Levin (to (United States) Sky Blue FC) |
| 5 | MF | AUS | Emily van Egmond (to (United States) Chicago Red Stars) |
| 7 | MF | AUS | Heather Garriock |
| 8 | MF | USA | Tori Huster (to (United States) Washington Spirit) |
| 9 | FW | AUS | Jenna Kingsley |
| 10 | MF | AUS | Servet Uzunlar (to (Australia) Sydney FC) |
| 13 | FW | AUS | Catherine Cannuli (Retired) |
| 14 | MF | AUS | Alanna Kennedy (to (Australia) Perth Glory) |
| 15 | MF | AUS | Teigen Allen (to (United States) Western New York Flash) |
| 17 | FW | AUS | Kyah Simon (to (Australia) Sydney FC) |
| 20 | GK | AUS | Georgia Rowntree |
| 22 | GK | AUS | Dimi Poulos (end of contract) |
| 28 | MF | AUS | Renee Tomkins |

== Technical staff ==
| Position | Name |
|---|---|
| Head coach | (Australia) Norm Boardman |
| Assistant coach | (Australia) Lisa Warrener |
| Strength & conditioning coach | (Australia) Danny Deigan |

== Competitions ==
=== W-League ===
==== Fixtures ====
| 14 September 2014 1 | Western Sydney Wanderers | 1 – 4 | Canberra United | Campbelltown |
| 15:00 AEST | Koulizakis 90+1' | Report | Heyman 3', 40'; Brush 56'; Munoz 75' | Stadium: Campbelltown Stadium; Referee: Rebecca Durcau |

| 21 September 2014 2 | Melbourne Victory | 5 – 3 | Western Sydney Wanderers | Melbourne |
| 15:00 AEST | Jackson 20'; Quigley 24', 46'; De Vanna 51'; Koca 74' | Report | Winters 12', 55'; Carney 90+3' | Stadium: Broadmeadows Valley Park; Referee: Casey Reibelt |

| 27 September 2014 3 | Western Sydney Wanderers | 0 – 2 | Sydney FC | Sydney |
| 15:00 AEST | O'Neill (yellow card) ?' (red card) 80' | Report | Spencer 12'; Harrison 60' | Stadium: Marconi Stadium; Attendance: 3,084; Referee: Kiralee Andruschak |

| 5 October 2014 4 | Western Sydney Wanderers | 1 – 10 | Perth Glory | Sydney |
| 15:00 AEDT | Petinos 51' | Report | Kerr 45', 45+1'; K. Gill 49', 53', 60', 69', 78'; Foord 54', 86'; Kennedy 73' | Stadium: Marconi Stadium; Referee: Rebecca Durcau |

| 12 October 2014 5 | Brisbane Roar | 1 – 2 | Western Sydney Wanderers | Brisbane |
| 13:00 AEST | Butt 45+1' | Report | Beard 30'; Crummer 55' (o.g.) | Stadium: Suncorp Stadium; Referee: Casey Reibelt |

| 19 October 2014 6 | Western Sydney Wanderers | 1 – 5 | Newcastle Jets | Sydney |
| 15:00 AEDT | Carney 31' | Report | van Egmond 45+2'; Reynolds 47'; Andrews 51', 59'; Yeoman-Dale 75' | Stadium: Marconi Stadium; Referee: Katie Patterson |

| 26 October 2014 7 | Sydney FC | 1 – 2 | Western Sydney Wanderers | Sydney |
| 15:00 AEDT | Spencer 55' | Report | Winters 16'; Allen 63' (o.g.) | Stadium: Sydney United Sports Centre; Referee: Rachel Mitchenson |

| 1 November 2014 8 | Canberra United | 1 – 1 | Western Sydney Wanderers | Canberra |
| 17:00 AEDT | Brush 90' | Report | Beard 10' | Stadium: McKellar Park; Attendance: 657; Referee: Lara Smith |

| 9 November 2014 9 | Western Sydney Wanderers | 0 – 3 | Melbourne Victory | Sydney |
| 15:00 AEDT | | Report | Catley 4'; Quigley 38'; De Vanna 74' | Stadium: Marconi Stadium; Referee: Kirralee Andruschak |

| 15 November 2014 10 | Perth Glory | 5 – 0 | Western Sydney Wanderers | Perth |
| 15:00 AWST | Kerr 17', 35'; McCallum 39'; Tabain 60'; K. Gill 87' | Report | | Stadium: Ashfield Reserve; Referee: Rachel Mitchenson |

| 23 November 2014 11 | Adelaide United | 2 – 2 | Western Sydney Wanderers | Adelaide |
| 14:30 ACDT | Condon 3'; Chidiac 72' | Report | Winters 27' (pen.), 63' (pen.) | Stadium: Adelaide Shores Football Centre; Referee: Lara Smith |

| 7 December 2014 12 | Western Sydney Wanderers | 1 – 3 | Brisbane Roar | Sydney |
| 15:00 AEDT | Petinos 66' | Report | Gorry 20'; Butt 41'; Franco 85' | Stadium: Sportingbet Stadium; Referee: Katie Patterson |

==== League table ====
| Pos | Team | Pld | W | D | L | GF | GA | GD | Pts | Qualification |
|---|---|---|---|---|---|---|---|---|---|---|
| 1 | Perth Glory | 12 | 10 | 0 | 2 | 39 | 10 | +29 | 30 | Qualification to Finals series |
| 2 | Melbourne Victory | 12 | 6 | 2 | 4 | 26 | 15 | +11 | 20 | Qualification to Finals series |
| 3 | Canberra United (C) | 12 | 6 | 2 | 4 | 22 | 18 | +4 | 20 | Qualification to Finals series |
| 4 | Sydney FC | 12 | 5 | 3 | 4 | 17 | 16 | +1 | 18 | Qualification to Finals series |
| 5 | Newcastle Jets | 12 | 5 | 2 | 5 | 25 | 21 | +4 | 17 | |
| 6 | Brisbane Roar | 12 | 4 | 2 | 6 | 18 | 19 | −1 | 14 | |
| 7 | Adelaide United | 12 | 3 | 1 | 8 | 9 | 29 | −20 | 10 | |
| 8 | Western Sydney Wanderers | 12 | 2 | 2 | 8 | 14 | 42 | −28 | 8 | |

Source: au.soccerway.com
Rules for classification: 1) points; 2) goal difference; 3) number of goals scored.
(C) Champions

==== Results summary ====
| Overall | | | | | | | | Home | | | | | | Away | | | | | |
| Pld | W | D | L | GF | GA | GD | Pts | W | D | L | GF | GA | GD | W | D | L | GF | GA | GD |
|---|---|---|---|---|---|---|---|---|---|---|---|---|---|---|---|---|---|---|---|
| 12 | 2 | 2 | 8 | 14 | 42 | −28 | 8 | 0 | 0 | 6 | 4 | 27 | −23 | 2 | 2 | 2 | 10 | 15 | −5 |

Last updated: 7 December 2014.
Source: Competitive Matches

==== Results by round ====
| Round | 1 | 2 | 3 | 4 | 5 | 6 | 7 | 8 | 9 | 10 | 11 | 12 |
|---|---|---|---|---|---|---|---|---|---|---|---|---|
| Ground | H | A | H | H | A | H | A | A | H | A | A | H |
| Result | L | L | L | L | W | L | W | D | L | L | D | L |
| Position | 8 | 8 | 8 | 8 | 7 | 8 | 7 | 7 | 8 | 8 | 8 | 8 |

Updated to match(es) played on 7 December 2014. Source: Competitive Matches
A = Away; H = Home; W = Win; D = Draw; L = Loss

==== Goal scorers ====
| Total | Player | | Goals per Round | | | | | | | | | | | |
| Total | Player | | 1 | 2 | 3 | 4 | 5 | 6 | 7 | 8 | 9 | 10 | 11 | 12 |
|---|---|---|---|---|---|---|---|---|---|---|---|---|---|---|
| 5 | (United States) | Keelin Winters | | 2 | | | | | 1 | | | | 2 | |
| 2 | (Australia) | Michelle Carney | | 1 | | | | 1 | | | | | | |
| 2 | (England) | Hannah Beard | | | | | 1 | | | 1 | | | | |
| 2 | (Australia) | Helen Petinos | | | | 1 | | | | | | | | 1 |
| 2 | Goal | Own goal | | | | | 1 | | 1 | | | | | |
| 1 | (Australia) | Demi Koulizakis | 1 | | | | | | | | | | | |
| 14 | TOTAL | | 1 | 3 | 0 | 1 | 2 | 1 | 2 | 1 | 0 | 0 | 2 | 1 |

== Awards ==
- Player of the Week (Round 2) - Keelin Winters
- Player of the Week (Round 7) - Hannah Beard
