= 2015–16 Western Sydney Wanderers FC (women) season =

4th season in existence of Western Sydney Wanderers (women)

Western Sydney Wanderers (women)
2015–16 season
- Owner: Paul Lederer
- Chairman: Paul Lederer
- Head Coach: Norm Boardman
- Stadium: Marconi Stadium
- W-League: 7th
- W-League Finals: DNQ
- Top goalscorer: 5 players (2 each) (Note: Hannah Beard, Liz Grey, Erica Holloway, Carmelina Moscato and Keelin Winters each scored two goals.)
- Highest home attendance: 2,432 vs. Sydney FC (1 November 2015); W-League
- Lowest home attendance: 583 vs. Perth Glory (17 January 2016); W-League
- Biggest win: 3–1 vs. Melbourne Victory (H) (15 November 2015); W-League; 2–0 vs. Perth Glory (H) (17 January 2016); W-League
- Biggest defeat: 0–4 vs. Melbourne City (A) (3 January 2016); W-League
Home colours	Away colours

The 2015–16 season was Western Sydney Wanderers Football Club (women)'s fourth season in the W-League. Western Sydney Wanderers finished 7th in their W-League season.

== Players ==
Note: Flags indicate national team as defined under FIFA eligibility rules; some limited exceptions apply. Players may hold more than one non-FIFA nationality.

No.	Pos.	Nation	Player
1	GK	AUS	Teagan Micah
2	DF	AUS	Caitlin Cooper
3	DF	CAN	Carmelina Moscato
4	MF	AUS	Chloe O'Brien
5	DF	USA	Kendall Johnson
6	DF	AUS	Rachael Soutar
7	FW	AUS	Helen Petinos
8	FW	AUS	Erica Halloway
9	FW	AUS	Liz Grey
10	FW	AUS	Michelle Carney
11	MF	USA	Keelin Winters

No.	Pos.	Nation	Player
12	FW	ENG	Hannah Beard
13	MF	AUS	Eliza Ammendolia
14	FW	AUS	Demi Koulizakis
15	DF	AUS	Ellie Carpenter
16	MF	AUS	Linda O'Neill
17	FW	AUS	Alix Roberts
18	FW	AUS	Tara Pender
19	FW	AUS	Jordan Baker
20	GK	AUS	Jada Mathyssen-Whyman
30	GK	AUS	Lisa Farrington

== Transfers and contracts ==
=== Transfers in ===
No.	Position	Player	Transferred from	Type/fee	Date	Ref.
20	GK	Jada Mathyssen-Whyman	(Australia) Macarthur Rams	Free transfer	2 September 2015	
15	DF	Ellie Carpenter	(Australia) NSW Institute	Free transfer	23 September 2015	
1	GK	Teagan Micah	Brisbane Roar	Free transfer	25 September 2015	
3	DF	(Canada) Carmelina Moscato	(United States) Seattle Reign	Free transfer	25 September 2015	
8	FW	Erica Halloway	(Australia) Illawarra Stingrays	Free transfer	25 September 2015	
9	FW	Liz Grey	(Australia) Sydney University	Free transfer	25 September 2015	
13	MF	Eliza Ammendolia	(Australia) Macarthur Rams	Free transfer	25 September 2015	
17	FW	Alix Roberts	(Australia) Blacktown Spartans	Free transfer	25 September 2015	
18	FW	Tara Pender	(Australia) Blacktown Spartans	Free transfer	25 September 2015	

=== Transfers out ===
No.	Position	Player	Transferred to	Type/fee	Date	Ref.
18	FW	Tia Gavin	(United States) Washington State Cougars	Free transfer	28 January 2015	
20	GK	Sham Khamis	Sydney FC	Free transfer	12 August 2015	
1	GK	Trudy Burke	Melbourne City	Free transfer	17 September 2015	
9	FW	Jenna Kingsley	Newcastle Jets	Free transfer	7 October 2015	
3	DF	Jessica Seaman	(Australia) North West Sydney Koalas	Free transfer	16 October 2015	
4	MF	Caitlin Jarvie	(Australia) Marconi Stallions	Free transfer	16 October 2015	
8	DF	Grace Henry	(Australia) Sydney University	Free transfer	16 October 2015	
11	MF	Lorena Bugden	Unattached	Free transfer	16 October 2015	
15	MF	Rhianna Pollicina	(Australia) North West Sydney Koalas	Free transfer	16 October 2015	
22	DF	Victoria Guzman	(Australia) Sydney University	Free transfer	16 October 2015	

=== Contract extensions ===
No.	Position	Player	Duration	Date	Ref.
2	DF	Caitlin Cooper	1 year	25 September 2015	
4	MF	Chloe O'Brien	1 year	25 September 2015	
5	DF	(United States) Kendall Johnson	1 year	25 September 2015	
6	DF	Rachael Soutar	1 year	25 September 2015	
7	FW	Helen Petinos	1 year	25 September 2015	
10	FW	Michelle Carney	1 year	25 September 2015	
12	FW	(England) Hannah Beard	1 year	25 September 2015	
14	DF	Demi Koulizakis	1 year	25 September 2015	
16	MF	Linda O'Neill	1 year	25 September 2015	
19	FW	Jordan Baker	1 year	25 September 2015	

== Competitions ==
=== Overall record ===
Competition	First match	Last match	Starting round	Final position	Record							
Competition	First match	Last match	Starting round	Final position	Pld	W	D	L	GF	GA	GD	Win %
W-League	17 October 2015	17 January 2016	Matchday 1	7th	12	3	3	6	15	25	−10	25.00
Total					12	3	3	6	15	25	−10	25.00

Source: Competitions

=== W-League ===
==== League table ====
Pos	Team	Pld	W	D	L	GF	GA	GD	Pts	Qualification
1	Melbourne City (C)	12	12	0	0	38	4	+34	36	Qualification to Finals series
2	Canberra United	12	8	2	2	26	8	+18	26	Qualification to Finals series
3	Sydney FC	12	6	1	5	15	21	−6	19	Qualification to Finals series
4	Brisbane Roar	12	5	1	6	16	17	−1	16	Qualification to Finals series
5	Adelaide United	12	3	4	5	18	19	−1	13	
6	Newcastle Jets	12	3	4	5	9	12	−3	13	
7	Western Sydney Wanderers	12	3	3	6	15	25	−10	12	
8	Perth Glory	12	3	2	7	10	23	−13	11	
9	Melbourne Victory	12	2	1	9	10	28	−18	7	

Source: A-Leagues
Rules for classification: 1) points; 2) goal difference; 3) number of goals scored.
(C) Champions

==== Results summary ====
Overall								Home						Away					
Pld	W	D	L	GF	GA	GD	Pts	W	D	L	GF	GA	GD	W	D	L	GF	GA	GD
12	3	3	6	15	25	−10	12	2	0	4	7	11	−4	1	3	2	8	14	−6

Source: worldfootball.net

==== Results by round ====
Round	1	2	3	4	5	6	7	8	9	10	11	12	13	14
Ground	A	H	H	A	H	B	H	A	A	B	H	A	A	H
Result	D	L	L	W	W	X	L	D	D	X	L	L	L	W
Position	4	7	8	6	3	4	6	6	6	6	6	7	8	7
Points	1	1	1	4	7	7	7	8	9	9	9	9	9	12

Source: worldfootball.net
A = Away; H = Home; B = Bye; W = Win; D = Draw; L = Loss; X = Bye

==== Matches ====
The league fixtures were announced on 7 September 2015.

Win Draw Loss

17 October 2015 1	Adelaide United	2–2	Western Sydney Wanderers	Adelaide
15:00 ACDT	Woldmoe 41'; Powell 62'	Report	Winters 3'; Cooper 17'	Stadium: Adelaide Shores Football Centre; Referee: Casey Reibelt

25 October 2015 2	Western Sydney Wanderers	0–3	Brisbane Roar	Sydney
15:00 AEDT		Report	Gielnik 63', 75' (pen.); Marzano 90+1'	Stadium: Marconi Stadium; Referee: Lara Smith

1 November 2015 3	Western Sydney Wanderers	1–2	Sydney FC	Sydney
14:00 AEDT	Grey 82'	Report	Khamis 2', 37'	Stadium: Pirtek Stadium; Attendance: 2,432; Referee: Rebecca Durcau

7 November 2015 4	Newcastle Jets	1–2	Western Sydney Wanderers	Newcastle
14:00 AEDT	Kingsley 3'	Report	O'Brien 57'; Moscato 90+2'	Stadium: Magic Park; Attendance: 1,724; Referee: Kelly Jones

15 November 2015 5	Western Sydney Wanderers	3–1	Melbourne Victory	Sydney
15:00 AEDT	Carney 24'; Dimovski 55' (o.g.); Winters 70' (pen.)	Report	Spiranovic 75'	Stadium: Marconi Stadium; Referee: Lara Lee

29 November 2015 7	Western Sydney Wanderers	1–4	Canberra United	Gosford
14:00 AEDT	Halloway 77'	Report	Fletcher 14', 79'; Soutar 53' (o.g.); Sykes 83'	Stadium: Central Coast Stadium; Referee: Kelly Jones

6 December 2015 8	Sydney FC	2–2	Western Sydney Wanderers	Sydney
16:00 AEDT	Kennedy 9'; Simon 74'	Report	Beard 19'; Grey 84'	Stadium: Lambert Park; Attendance: 891; Referee: Katie Petterson

12 December 2015 9	Melbourne Victory	2–2	Western Sydney Wanderers	Melbourne
15:00 AEDT	Barbieri 51'; Dowie 74'	Report	O'Neill 40'; Moscato 47'	Stadium: David Barro Stadium; Referee: Kate Jacewicz

27 December 2015 11	Western Sydney Wanderers	0–1	Newcastle Jets	Sydney
15:00 AEDT		Report	Andrews 41'	Stadium: Popondetta Park; Attendance: 923; Referee: Lara Lee

3 January 2016 12	Melbourne City	4–0	Western Sydney Wanderers	Melbourne
14:00 AEDT	Little 12', 33' (pen.); Goad 67'; Tabain 70'	Report		Stadium: CB Smith Reserve; Referee: Rachael Mitchenson

10 January 2016 13	Canberra United	3–0	Western Sydney Wanderers	Canberra
16:00 AEDT	Munoz 6'; Kiting 11'; Pérez 58'	Report		Stadium: McKellar Park; Attendance: 1,281; Referee: Rebecca Durcau

17 January 2016 14	Western Sydney Wanderers	2–0	Perth Glory	Sydney
15:00 AEDT	Halloway 87'; Beard 90+1'	Report		Stadium: Popondetta Park; Attendance: 583; Referee: Kate Jacewicz
