= List of Western Sydney Wanderers FC (women) players =

This is a list of Western Sydney Wanderers FC W-League players both past and present.

† indicates player capped internationally

== A ==
- (Australia) Teigen Allen†
- (Australia) Mackenzie Arnold†

== B ==
- (Australia) Jordan Baker
- (Australia) Alisha Bass
- (England) Hannah Beard
- (Philippines) Sarina Bolden

== C ==
- (Australia) Trudy Camilleri
- (Australia) Catherine Cannuli†
- (Australia) Michelle Carney
- (Australia) Ellie Carpenter†
- (New Zealand) Milly Clegg
- (Australia) Caitlin Cooper†

== D ==
- (England) Lizzie Durack†

== F ==
- (Sweden) Louise Fors†

== G ==
- (Australia) Heather Garriock†
- (United States) Shawna Gordon

== H ==
- (Australia) Erica Halloway
- (Australia) Vanessa Hart
- (Iceland) Thora Helgadottir†
- (United States) Tori Huster
- (Australia) Alexandra Huynh
- (Australia) Bryleeh Henry†
- (Australia) Sarah Hunter

== J ==
- (United States) Kendall Johnson

== K ==
- (Australia) Talia Kapetanellis
- (Australia) Olivia Kennedy
- (Australia) Alanna Kennedy†
- (Australia) Jenna Kingsley†

== L ==
- (United States) Camille Levin
- (Australia) Rachel Lowe†

== M ==
- (Canada) Carmelina Moscato†
- (Australia) Jada Mathyssen-Whyman

== O ==
- (Australia) Linda O'Neill

== P ==
- (Australia) Helen Petinos
- (Australia) Dimi Poulos

== S ==
- (Australia) Candace Sciberras
- (Australia) Jessica Seaman
- (Australia) Rachael Soutar
- (Australia) Samantha Spackman

== T ==
- (Australia) Renee Tomkins

== U ==
- (Australia) Servet Uzunlar†

== V ==
- (Australia) Emily van Egmond†
- (Australia) Cortnee Vine†

== W ==
- (Australia) Sarah Walsh†
- (United States) Lynn Williams†
- (United States) Keelin Winters
