= 2013–14 Western Sydney Wanderers FC (women) season =

Western Sydney Wanderers WFC
2013–14 season
- Chairman: Lyall Gorman
- Manager: Stephen Roche
- Stadium: Campbelltown Stadium
- W-League: 7th
- Top goalscorer: Catherine Cannuli (6)
Home colours	Away colours

The 2013–14 Western Sydney Wanderers FC W-League season was the club's second participation in the W-League, since the club's formation in 2012.

== Players ==
=== Squad information ===
Note: Flags indicate national team as defined under FIFA eligibility rules; some limited exceptions apply. Players may hold more than one non-FIFA nationality.

No.	Pos.	Nation	Player
1	GK	AUS	Mackenzie Arnold
2	DF	AUS	Caitlin Cooper
3	MF	USA	Shawna Gordon
4	DF	USA	Camille Levin
5	MF	AUS	Emily van Egmond
6	MF	AUS	Rachael Soutar
7	MF	AUS	Heather Garriock (Captain)
8	MF	USA	Tori Huster
9	FW	AUS	Jenna Kingsley
10	MF	AUS	Servet Uzunlar
11	FW	AUS	Michelle Carney

No.	Pos.	Nation	Player
12	DF	AUS	Jessica Seaman
13	FW	AUS	Catherine Cannuli
14	MF	AUS	Alanna Kennedy
15	MF	AUS	Teigen Allen
16	MF	AUS	Linda O'Neill
17	FW	AUS	Kyah Simon
18	FW	AUS	Helen Petinos
19	FW	AUS	Jordan Baker
20	GK	AUS	Georgia Rowntree
22	GK	AUS	Dimi Poulos
28	MF	AUS	Renee Tomkins

=== Transfers in ===
Note: Flags indicate national team as defined under FIFA eligibility rules; some limited exceptions apply. Players may hold more than one non-FIFA nationality.

No.	Pos.	Nation	Player
8	MF	USA	Tori Huster (from (United States) Washington Spirit)
11	FW	AUS	Michelle Carney (from (Australia) Illawarra Stingrays)
7	MF	AUS	Heather Garriock
2	DF	AUS	Caitlin Cooper (from (Australia) Canberra United)
14	MF	AUS	Alanna Kennedy (from (Australia) Sydney FC)
1	GK	AUS	Mackenzie Arnold (from (Australia) Canberra United)
17	FW	AUS	Kyah Simon (from (United States) Boston Breakers)
5	MF	AUS	Emily van Egmond (from (United States) Seattle Reign FC)
3	MF	USA	Shawna Gordon (from (United States) Boston Breakers)
19	FW	AUS	Jordan Baker (from (Australia) Illawarra Stingrays)
28	MF	AUS	Renee Tomkins (from (Australia) Marconi Stallions)
4	DF	USA	Camille Levin (from (Sweden) Göteborg FC)

=== Transfers out ===
Note: Flags indicate national team as defined under FIFA eligibility rules; some limited exceptions apply. Players may hold more than one non-FIFA nationality.

No.	Pos.	Nation	Player
1	GK	ENG	Lizzie Durack (to (England) Everton Ladies)
3	DF	AUS	Alexander Huynh (to (United States) Colorado Buffaloes)
4	DF	AUS	Alesha Clifford (to (Australia) Sydney FC)
8	MF	AUS	Vanessa Hart
9	FW	AUS	Sarah Walsh (Retired)
11	MF	SWE	Louise Fors (to (England) Liverpool Ladies)
14	MF	AUS	Trudy Camilleri (to (Australia) Sydney FC)
18	MF	AUS	Candace Sciberras (to (United States) Wyoming Cowgirls)
20	GK	ISL	Þóra Björg Helgadóttir (loan return to (Sweden) Malmö)

== Technical staff ==
Position	Name
Head coach	(Australia) Stephen Roche
Assistant coach	(Australia) Lisa Warrener
Strength & conditioning coach	(Australia) Danny Deigan

== Squad statistics ==
=== Disciplinary record ===
N	Pos.	Nat.	Name	Yellow card	Second yellow card	Red card	Notes
1	GK	(Australia)	Mackenzie Arnold	0	0	0	
2	DF	(Australia)	Caitlin Cooper	1	0	0	
3	MF	(United States)	Shawna Gordon	1	0	0	
4	DF	(United States)	Camille Levin	0	0	0	
5	MF	(Australia)	Emily van Egmond	2	0	0	
6	MF	(Australia)	Rachael Soutar	0	0	0	
7	MF	(Australia)	Heather Garriock	1	1	0	
8	MF	(United States)	Tori Huster	0	0	0	
9	FW	(Australia)	Jenna Kingsley	0	0	0	
10	MF	(Australia)	Servet Uzunlar	2	0	0	
11	FW	(Australia)	Michelle Carney	1	0	0	
12	DF	(Australia)	Jessica Seaman	0	0	0	
13	FW	(Australia)	Catherine Cannuli	2	0	0	
14	MF	(Australia)	Alanna Kennedy	2	0	0	
15	MF	(Australia)	Teigen Allen	2	0	0	
16	MF	(Australia)	Linda O'Neill	2	0	0	
17	FW	(Australia)	Kyah Simon	0	0	0	
18	FW	(Australia)	Helen Petinos	0	0	0	
19	FW	(Australia)	Jordan Baker	0	0	0	
20	GK	(Australia)	Georgia Rowntree	0	0	0	
22	GK	(Australia)	Dimi Poulos	0	0	0	
28	MF	(Australia)	Renee Tomkins	0	0	0	

Last updated: 10 February 2014
Source: Competitive matches
Only competitive matches
(yellow card) = Number of bookings; (second yellow card) = Number of sending offs after a second yellow card; (red card) = Number of sending offs by a direct red card.

=== Goal scorers ===
Total	Player		Goals per round											
Total	Player		1	2	3	4	5	6	7	8	9	10	11	12
6	(Australia)	Catherine Cannuli	1		1	1		2					1	
3	(Australia)	Michelle Carney				1				1		1		
2	(Australia)	Heather Garriock				1	1							
1	(Australia)	Helen Petinos					1							
1	(Australia)	Jenna Kingsley					1							
1	(Australia)	Linda O'Neill						1						
1	(Australia)	Jessica Seaman									1			
1	(United States)	Shawna Gordon										1		
1	(Australia)	Emily van Egmond												1
17	Total		1	0	1	3	3	3	0	1	1	2	1	1

== Competitions ==
=== W-League ===
==== League table ====
Pos	Team	Pld	W	D	L	GF	GA	GD	Pts	Qualification
1	Canberra United	12	9	0	3	28	8	+20	27	Qualification to Finals series
2	Sydney FC	12	8	2	2	37	14	+23	26	Qualification to Finals series
3	Melbourne Victory (C)	12	7	2	3	23	12	+11	23	Qualification to Finals series
4	Brisbane Roar	12	7	2	3	22	16	+6	23	Qualification to Finals series
5	Perth Glory	12	5	0	7	17	31	−14	15	
6	Adelaide United	12	3	4	5	12	15	−3	13	
7	Western Sydney Wanderers	12	2	3	7	17	23	−6	9	
8	Newcastle Jets	12	0	1	11	10	47	−37	1	

Source: au.soccerway.com
Rules for classification: 1) points; 2) goal difference; 3) number of goals scored.
(C) Champions

==== Results summary ====
Overall								Home						Away					
Pld	W	D	L	GF	GA	GD	Pts	W	D	L	GF	GA	GD	W	D	L	GF	GA	GD
12	2	3	7	17	23	−6	9	2	2	2	10	9	+1	0	1	5	7	14	−7

Last updated: 10 February 2014.
Source: Competitive Matches

==== Results by round ====
Round	1	2	3	4	5	6	7	8	9	10	11	12
Ground	H	A	H	A	H	H	A	A	H	A	H	A
Result	D	L	L	L	W	W	L	D	D	L	L	L
Position	4	6	7	7\6 (Note: Round 4 was postponed (played between rounds 8 and 9) due to clash with the International Women's Club Championship. The first position (7) is after the non-postponed matches of round 4. The second position (6) is after the postponed match.)	7	5	6	6	6	6	7	7

Updated to match(es) played on 10 February 2014. Source: Competitive Matches
A = Away; H = Home; W = Win; D = Draw; L = Loss

==== Matches ====
10 November 2013 1	Western Sydney Wanderers	1–1	Adelaide United	Sydney
14:00 AEDT	Cannuli 90+2'	Report	Gummer 31'	Stadium: Marconi Stadium; Referee: Rebecca Durcau

17 November 2013 2	Canberra United	2–0	Western Sydney Wanderers	Canberra
15:00 AEDT	Heyman 25'; Ochs 41'	Report		Stadium: McKellar Park; Attendance: 1,007; Referee: Kate Jacewicz

1 December 2013 3	Western Sydney Wanderers	1–4	Brisbane Roar	Sydney
15:00 AEDT	Cannuli 43'	Report	Gorry 49', 81', 90'; Raso 51'	Stadium: Marconi Stadium; Referee: Kate Jacewicz

15 January 2014 4	Sydney FC	4–3	Western Sydney Wanderers	Sydney
19:30 AEDT	Kerr 5'; Allen 7' (o.g.); Taylor 47' (pen.); Bolger 58'	Report	Carney 70'; Garriock 78'; Cannuli 81'	Stadium: Jubilee Oval

14 December 2013 5	Western Sydney Wanderers	3–0	Perth Glory	Sydney
14:00 AEDT	Petinos 45+2'; Garriock 61'; Kingsley 75'	Report	Studman (yellow card) 64' (red card) 85'	Stadium: Marconi Stadium; Referee: Lara Smith

22 December 2013 6	Western Sydney Wanderers	3–0	Newcastle Jets	Penrith
15:00 AEDT	O'Neill 45'; Cannuli 71', 76'	Report		Stadium: Centrebet Stadium; Referee: Rachel Mitchelson

4 January 2014 7	Melbourne Victory	2–0	Western Sydney Wanderers	Melbourne
16:30 AEDT	Friend 47'; Goad 73'	Report		Stadium: AAMI Park; Referee: Rebecca Durcau

11 January 2014 8	Adelaide United	1–1	Western Sydney Wanderers	Adelaide
14:30 ACDT	Condon 70'	Report	Carney 90+6'	Stadium: Burton Park; Referee: Rebecca Durcau

19 January 2014 9	Western Sydney Wanderers	1–1	Melbourne Victory	Sydney
16:00 AEDT	Seaman 85'	Report	O'Neill 34' (o.g.)	Stadium: Campbelltown Stadium; Referee: Kelly Jones

24 January 2014 10	Brisbane Roar	3–2	Western Sydney Wanderers	Brisbane
16:00 AEST	Crummer 19'; Raso 31'; Butt 82'	Report	Gordon 8'; Carney 45+2'; Garriock (yellow card) (red card) 75'	Stadium: Suncorp Stadium; Referee: Casey Reibelt

2 February 2014 11	Western Sydney Wanderers	1–3	Sydney FC	Sydney
15:00 AEDT	Cannuli 90+5' (pen.)	Report	L. Khamis 8'; Taylor 37', 57'	Stadium: Campbelltown Stadium; Referee: Kate Jacewicz

8 February 2014 12	Perth Glory	2–1	Western Sydney Wanderers	Perth
17:00 AWST	K. Gill 47', 84'	Report	van Egmond 15'	Stadium: Percy Doyle Reserve; Referee: Rachel Mitchenson

== Awards ==
- Player of the Week (Round 6) – Shawna Gordon
