= List of Western Sydney Wanderers FC (women) seasons =

Chart of yearly table positions for Western Sydney Wanderers in A-League Women

Western Sydney Wanderers Football Club is an Australian professional association football club based in Rooty Hill, New South Wales; the club was formed in 2012. On 4 April 2012, the creation of Western Sydney Wanderers FC was announced by then CEO of Football Federation Australia Ben Buckley. It was also announced soon after that an associated women's team would compete in the W-League. The team currently competes in the A-League Women, the top tier of women's soccer in Australia. They became the second team based in Sydney to compete in the A-League Woman. The Wanderers have competed in thirteen seasons in the A-League Woman (originally named W-League) and have made the Finals one time in the 2019-20 W-League season.

== Key ==
Key to league competitions:

- A-League Women – Australia's top soccer league, established in 2008 (originally named W-League).
- Finals – The annual postseason elimination tournament for the A-League.
- AFC Women's Champions League – The most prestigious woman's club competition in Asian football; introduced in 2024 as the Asian Champion Club Tournament (Formourly AFC Women's Club Championship).

Key to colours and symbols:

1st or W	Winners
2nd or RU	Runners-up
3rd	Third

Key to league record:

- Season = The year and article of the season
- League = League name
- P = Games played
- W = Games won
- D = Games drawn
- L = Games lost
- GF = Goals scored
- GA = Goals against
- Pts = Points
- Pos = Final position

Key to cup record:

- Dash (-) = Did not qualify
- Group = Group stage
- R32 = Round of 32
- R16 = Round of 16
- QF = Quarter-finals
- SF = Semi-finals
- RU = Runners-up
- W = Winners

== Seasons ==
Season	League									Finals	Other competitions		Top goalscorer(s)	
Season	League	P	W	D	L	GF	GA	Pts	Pos	Finals	Competition	Result	Name(s)	Goals
2012–13	W–League	12	4	1	7	19	23	13	6th	—	—	—	Louise Fors	5
2013–14	W–League	12	2	3	7	17	23	9	7th	—	—	—	Catherine Cannuli	6
2014	W–League	12	2	2	8	14	42	8	8th	—	—	—	Keelin Winters	5
2015–16	W–League	12	3	3	6	15	25	12	7th	—	—	—	Five players	2
2016–17	W–League	12	4	1	7	14	29	13	8th	—	—	—	Katie Stengel	6
2017–18	W–League	12	3	2	7	13	21	11	8th	—	—	—	Erica Halloway	3
2018–19	W–League	12	1	1	10	11	30	4	9th	—	—	—	Kylie Ledbrook	3
2019–20	W–League	12	7	1	4	24	20	22	4th	SF	—	—	Kristen Hamilton	7
2020–21	W–League	12	4	1	7	13	21	13	6th	—	—	—	Rosie Galea	4
2021–22	A–League Women	14	1	4	9	7	27	7	9th	—	—	—	Ashlie Crofts	3
2022–23	A–League Women	18	5	4	9	16	23	19	7th	—	—	—	Ashlie Crofts	3
2023-24	A–League Women	22	10	3	9	30	30	33	7th	—	—	—	Sophie Harding	12
2024-25	A–League Women	23	4	4	15	28	46	16	12th	—	—	—	Sienna Saveska	7

== See also ==
- List of Western Sydney Wanderers FC seasons (men's team)
- Western Sydney Wanderers FC (women)
