= Lisa Farrington =

American art historian

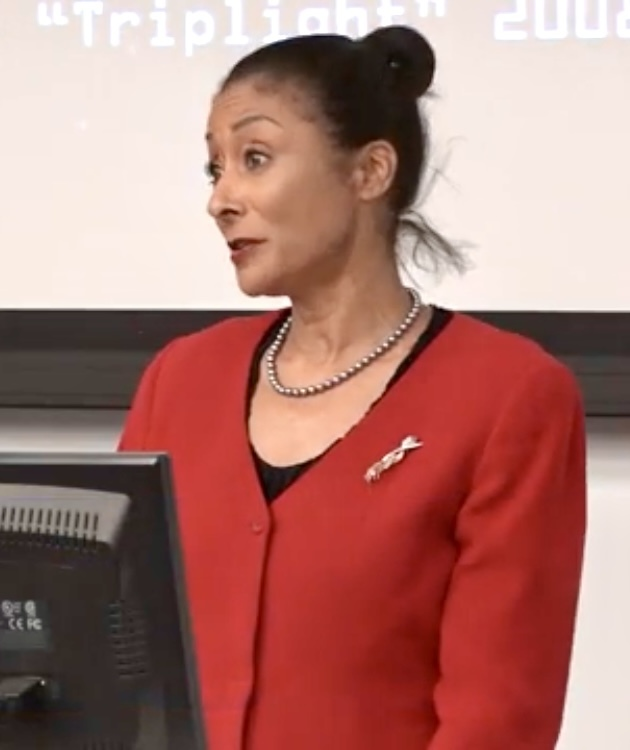
- Farrington gives a talk in 2017
- Education: Howard University and American University
- Employer: John Jay College of Criminal Justice
- Title: Distinguished Professor in the Department of Art and Music

Lisa Farrington is an American art historian, specializing in African-American art, Haitian art, and women's art. She is a Distinguished Professor in the Department of Art and Music at the John Jay College of Criminal Justice (City University of New York). Farrington is one of the major scholars of Faith Ringgold, is the author of several books on African-American art, and is one of only six full professors of African-American art history in the United States.

== Career ==
Farrington is a graduate of Howard University (BFA) and American University (MA), and subsequently obtained her MPh and PhD in Art History & philosophy at the CUNY Graduate Center in 1997 with a dissertation titled “Faith Ringgold: The Early Works & the Evolution of the Thangka Paintings”.

Her 2005 book Creating Their Own Image was the first comprehensive history of African-American female artists, from slavery to the present day. Her 2015 book, African-American Art: A Visual and Cultural History, is an updated survey on African-American art.

She was the William & Camille Cosby Endowed Scholar at Atlantic University/Spelman College from 2008 to 2007. In 2009, she received a grant from Creative Capital Art and the Andy Warhol Foundation to work on a monograph on Emma Amos.

On February 7, 2014, Farrington delivered a lecture, "The Artistic World before Racism: A Compelling Presentation of the African Diaspora Portrayed from Antiquity to the Present," at the Metropolitan Museum of Art.

== Curatorial activities ==
In 2013, Farrington curated the traveling exhibit "Women Call for Peace: Global Vistas." The exhibit included works by artists including Emma Amos, Siona Benjamin, Chakaia Booker, Judy Chicago, Susanne Kessler, Faith Ringgold, Aminah Robinson, Flo Oy Wong, and Helen Zughaib. She has also curated exhibits of art by Jill Freedman, Charlotta Janssen, and Gaye Ellington.

== Bibliography ==
- Black Artists in Their Own Words (University of California Press, 2025)
- African-American Art: A Visual and Cultural History (Oxford University Press, 2015)
- Creating Their Own Image: the History of African-American Women Artists (New York: Oxford University, 2005; 2nd ed. 2011). Awarded the 2005 Letitia Woods Brown Memorial Book Award from the American Association of Black Women Historians.
- Voices in Cloth: Story Quilts (Hattiesburg: University of Southern Mississippi, 2004)
- A Real-World Guide to Academic Publishing (New York: Millennium Fine Arts Publishing, 2006)
- Faith Ringgold (San Francisco: Pomegranate Fine Arts Publishers, 2004)
- Art on Fire: the Politics of Race and Sex in the Paintings of Faith Ringgold (New York: Millennium Fine Arts Publishing, 1999)
