= Chloe O'Brien (soccer) =

Australian soccer player

Personal information
- Full name: Chloe O'Brien
- Date of birth: 22 August 1997 (age 29)
- Place of birth: Australia
- Position: Midfielder

Senior career*
| Years | Team | Apps | (Gls) |
| 2014–2018 | Western Sydney Wanderers | 25 | (1) |
| 2015–2020 | Manly United | | |
| 2020–2021 | Newcastle Jets | 10 | (0) |
- * Club domestic league appearances and goals as of 20 February 2018

Chloe O'Brien (born 22 August 1997) is an Australian soccer player, who last played for Newcastle Jets in the Australian W-League.

== Playing career ==
=== Western Sydney Wanderers ===
O'Brien signed with Western Sydney Wanderers in 2015. During the 2014–15 W-League season, she made four appearances. The team finished the regular season in eighth place with a 2–8–2 record. During the 2015–16 W-League, she made 12 appearances and scored an equaliser during the team's 2–1 win over Newcastle Jets on 6 November 2015.

=== Newcastle Jets ===
O'Brien returned to the W-League in December 2020, joining Newcastle Jets She departed Newcastle Jets ahead of the 2021–22 A-League Women season.

=== International ===
O'Brien has represented Australia on the under-20 national team. During the 2015 AFC U-19 Women's Championship, she scored a stoppage time goal during the team's 2–0 win over Uzbekistan. Australia finished in third place during the group stage of the tournament.
