= Erica Halloway =

Australian soccer player

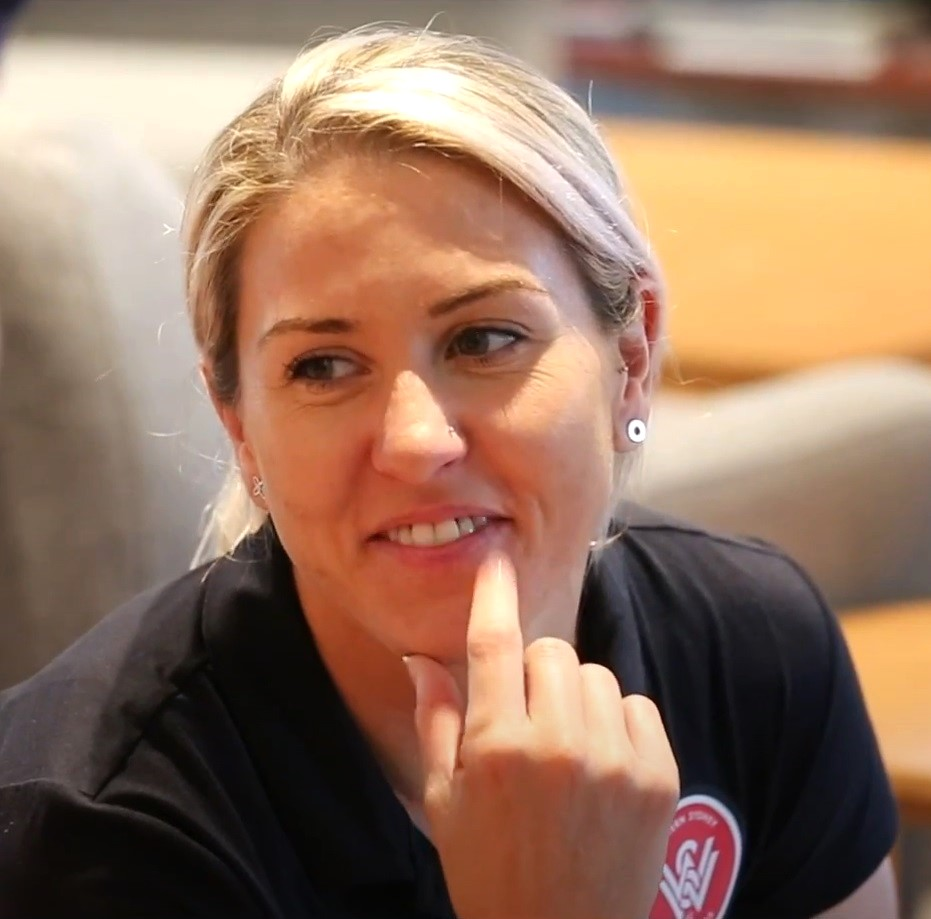
- Halloway with the Wanderers in 2018

Personal information
- Full name: Erica Halloway
- Date of birth: 4 November 1984 (age 42)
- Place of birth: Dubbo, Australia
- Position: Midfielder

Team information
- Current team: Western Sydney Wanderers
- Number: 8

Senior career*
Years	Team	Apps	(Gls)
- Illawarra Stingrays
2015–	Western Sydney Wanderers	60	(7)
- * Club domestic league appearances and goals as of 14 June 2020

Erica Halloway (born 4 November 1984) is an Australian association football player, who currently plays for Western Sydney Wanderers in the Australian W-League.

== Early life ==
Born in Dubbo, a city located in the Orana region of New South Wales, Australia, Halloway played for the Bathurst City Panthers. In 2002, she earned Women's Super League player of the year honours.

== Playing career ==
Halloway signed with Western Sydney Wanderers in 2015. In her 11 appearances with the team, she scored two goals. The team finished the regular season in seventh place. Halloway was awarded Western Sydney's W-League Player of the Year honours following her rookie season.

== Honours ==
with Western Sydney Wanderers

- Western Sydney Wanderers W-League Player of the Year: 2015/16

with Illawarra Stingrays

- Player's Player of the Year: 2013
