= Sham Khamis =

Australian soccer player (born 1995)

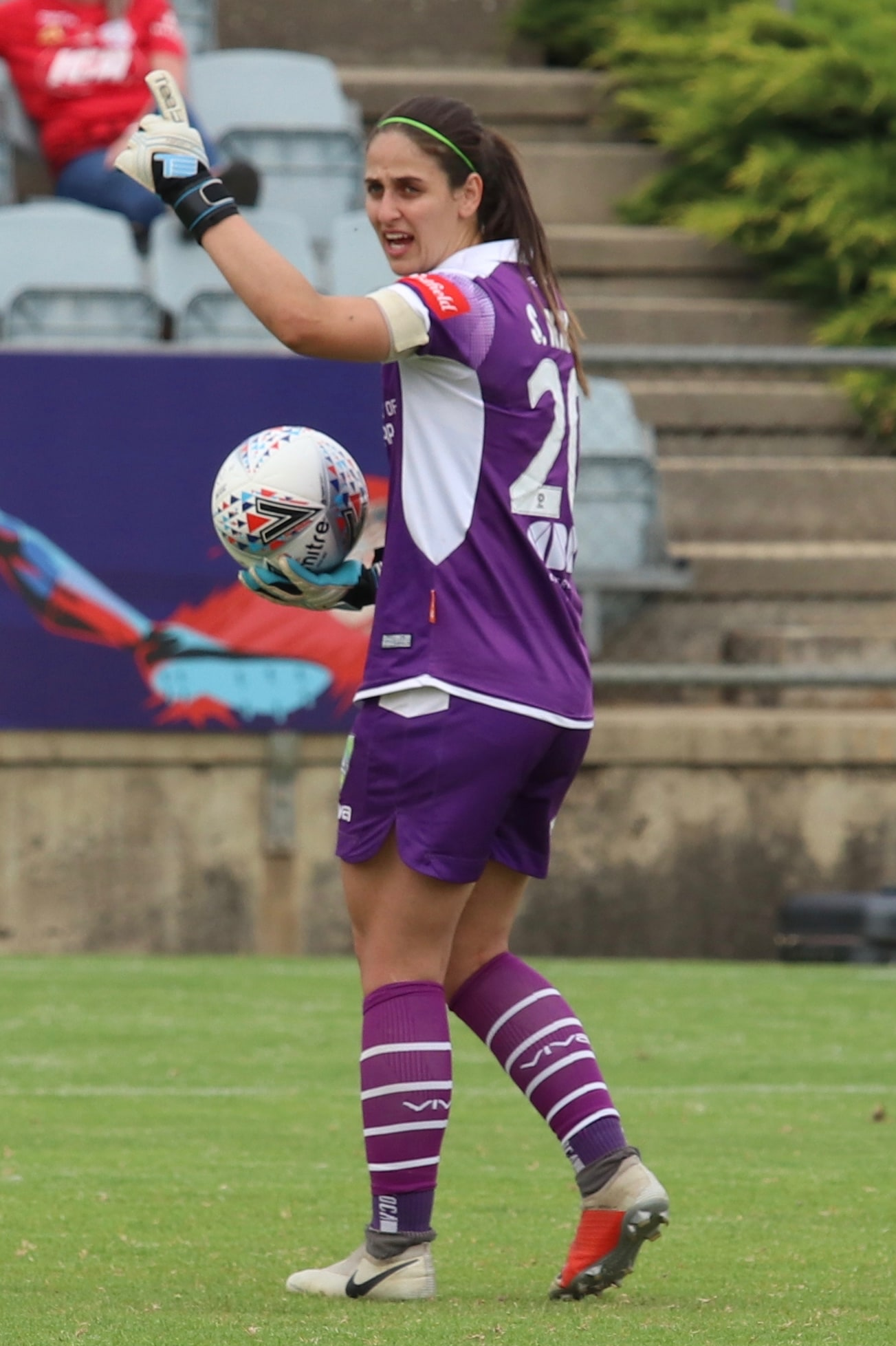

Personal information
- Full name: Shamiran Khamis
- Date of birth: 13 February 1995 (age 31)
- Place of birth: Sydney, New South Wales, Australia
- Height: 1.79 m (5 ft 10 in)
- Position: Goalkeeper

Youth career
- NSWIS

Senior career*
Years	Team	Apps	(Gls)
2011–2014	Sydney FC	10	(0)
2014	Western Sydney Wanderers	2	(0)
2015–2018	Sydney FC	18	(0)
2018–2020	Canberra United	24	(0)
2020	→ Melbourne Victory (loan)	0	(0)
2022–2023	Macarthur Rams	24	(0)
2022–2026	Western Sydney Wanderers	17	(0)
- * Club domestic league appearances and goals as of 28 May 2024

Shamiran Khamis (Note: Syriac: ܣܗܐܡܝܪܐܢ ܟܗܐܡܝܣ, [sɑːhɑˈmiːrɑːn kɑːˈhiːmis]; Arabic: شاميران خميس, [ʃaːmiːraːn xamiːs]) (born 13 February 1995) is an Australian professional soccer player who last played for Western Sydney Wanderers. She has previously played for Sydney FC, Western Sydney Wanderers, Canberra United, and Melbourne Victory in the Australian W-League.

== Early life ==
Khamis was born on 13 February 1995 in Sydney to a large Assyrian family. She grew up in Minto, a suburb of the Macarthur region of South Western Sydney.

== Club career ==
Khamis made her professional debut for Sydney FC during the 2011–12 W-League season. Sydney won the 2012–13 W-League Championship.

Khamis signed with the Western Sydney Wanderers for the 2014–15 season. After one season with the Wanderers, she returned to Sydney FC where she would remain for three seasons. Khamis signed with Canberra United for the 2018–19 W-League season. After initially moving to Canberra as a backup, she ended up playing every match after Melissa Maizels was injured during preseason.

In March 2020, she appeared on the bench for Melbourne Victory for one game.

She then joined Macarthur Rams.

In September 2021, Khamis returned to the W-League, joining Western Sydney Wanderers once more.

In August 2026, Khamis departed Western Sydney Wanderers.

== Personal life ==
Khamis' older sister Leena, is also a professional football player in the W-League, she plays for the Western Sydney Wanderers. The sisters played together at Sydney FC for several seasons.
