= Mackenzie Arnold =

Australian soccer player (born 1994)

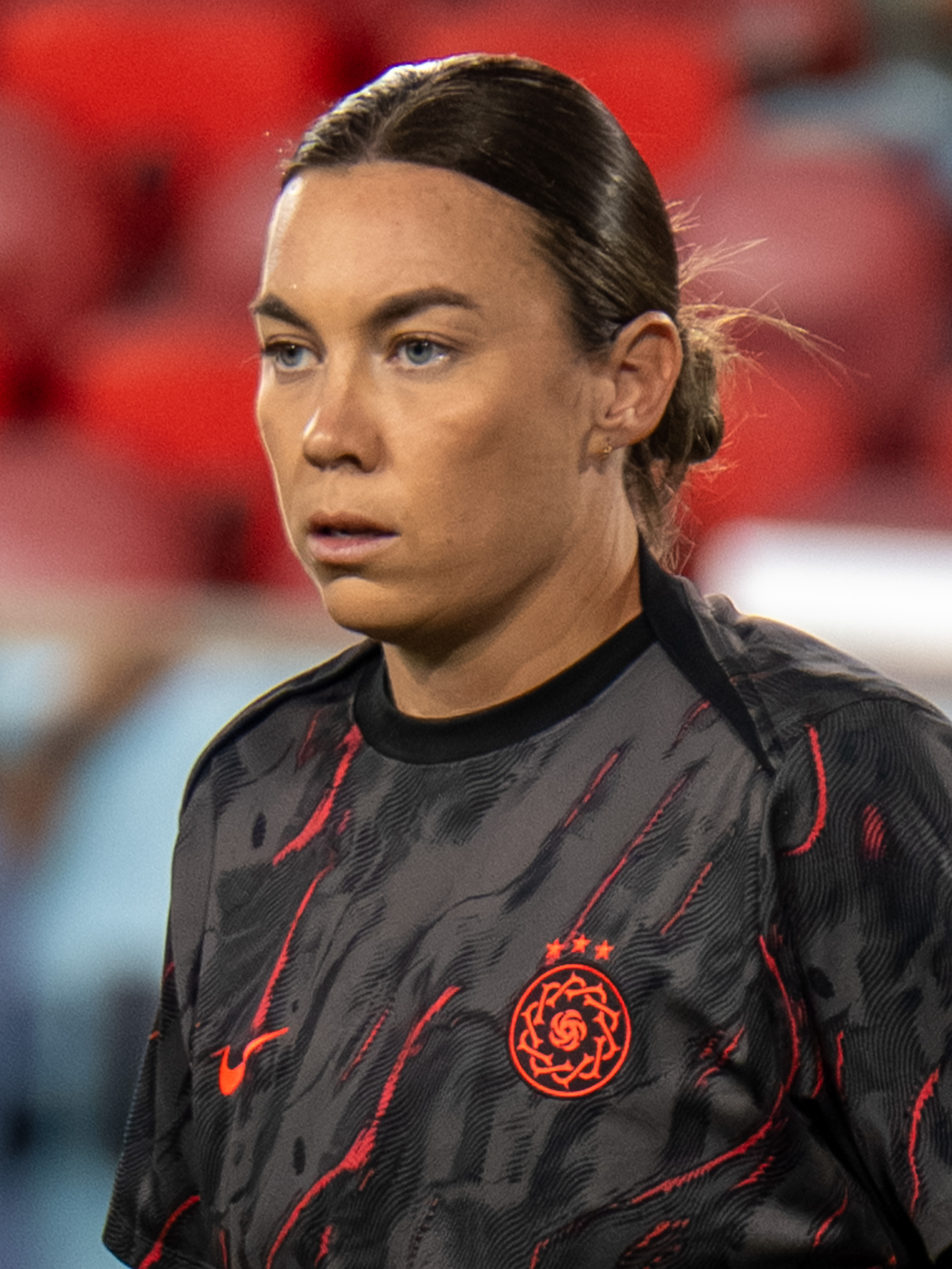
- Arnold with the Portland Thorns in 2025

Personal information
- Full name: Mackenzie Elizabeth Arnold
- Date of birth: 25 February 1994 (age 32)
- Place of birth: Gold Coast, Queensland, Australia
- Height: 1.81 m (5 ft 11 in)
- Position: Goalkeeper (Note: Arnold has played as a midfielder on one occasion in 2021 whilst playing for West Ham United.)

Team information
- Current team: Portland Thorns
- Number: 18

Youth career
- Burleigh Heads
- Robina City

Senior career*
Years	Team	Apps	(Gls)
2011–2012	Perth Glory	10	(0)
2012–2013	Canberra United	10	(0)
2013–2014	Western Sydney Wanderers	3	(0)
2014–2016	Perth Glory	22	(0)
2016–2020	Brisbane Roar	48	(0)
2018	Arna-Bjørnar	15	(0)
2019	Chicago Red Stars	0	(0)
2020–2024	West Ham United	75	(0)
2024–	Portland Thorns	51	(0)

International career^{‡}
2013	Australia U-20	8	(0)
2012–	Australia	70	(0)
- * Club domestic league appearances and goals as of 17:55, 11 November 2026 (UTC) ‡ National team caps and goals as of 10 October 2026

Mackenzie Elizabeth Arnold (born 25 February 1994), also known by her nickname Macca, is an Australian professional soccer player who plays as a goalkeeper for National Women's Soccer League club Portland Thorns FC and the Australia national team. She previously played for West Ham United in England's Women's Super League as well as Brisbane Roar, Perth Glory, Western Sydney Wanderers, and Canberra United in Australia's W-League and Arna-Bjørnar in Norway's Toppserien.

== Early life ==
Mackenzie Arnold was born to Steve and Leah Arnold and raised with an older sibling on the Gold Coast. Her sibling is profoundly deaf and wore hearing aids since being a toddler. In 2020, during the COVID-19 pandemic, Arnold acknowledged that she also has significant hearing loss and subsequently wears hearing aids off the pitch. In 2023, she partnered with Audika, a hearing clinic and service provider in Australia, to tackle the stigma of hearing loss.

Arnold played junior football for Burleigh Heads as well as Robina City and attended St Andrews Lutheran College for primary school, Palm Beach Currumbin State High School for secondary and completed a Certificate 4 in Fitness at Gold Coast TAFE (2013–2015).

== Club career ==
=== Canberra United ===
In 2012, Arnold joined Canberra United from Perth Glory ahead of the 2012–13 W-League.

=== Western Sydney Wanderers FC ===
Arnold joined Western Sydney Wanderers in 2013. However, she was later ruled out for a significant amount of the season after suffering a deep cut to the leg in the carpark following a match in the 2013 AFC U-19 Women's Championship.

=== Perth Glory FC ===
Arnold returned to Perth Glory in August 2014.

Arnold was approached to switch codes and play Australian rules football in the newly formed AFL Women's in 2016, but chose to remain in soccer.

=== Brisbane Roar FC ===
In October 2016, Brisbane Roar announced that they had signed Arnold.

=== Arna-Bjørnar ===
In March 2018, she signed with Arna-Bjørnar in the Toppserien.

=== Chicago Red Stars ===
In July 2019, she signed for the Chicago Red Stars, in the NWSL, but made no appearances.

=== West Ham United ===
On 9 July 2020, Arnold signed for English club West Ham United of the FA Women's Super League, where she was appointed the team's captain in 2023. On 18 April 2021, Arnold was handed a surprise 20-minute cameo in midfield during an 11–0 win over Chichester & Selsey in the fourth round of the Women's FA Cup.

In May 2024, she was voted Women's Hammer of the Year by West Ham United supporters for the 2023–24 season.

=== Portland Thorns FC ===
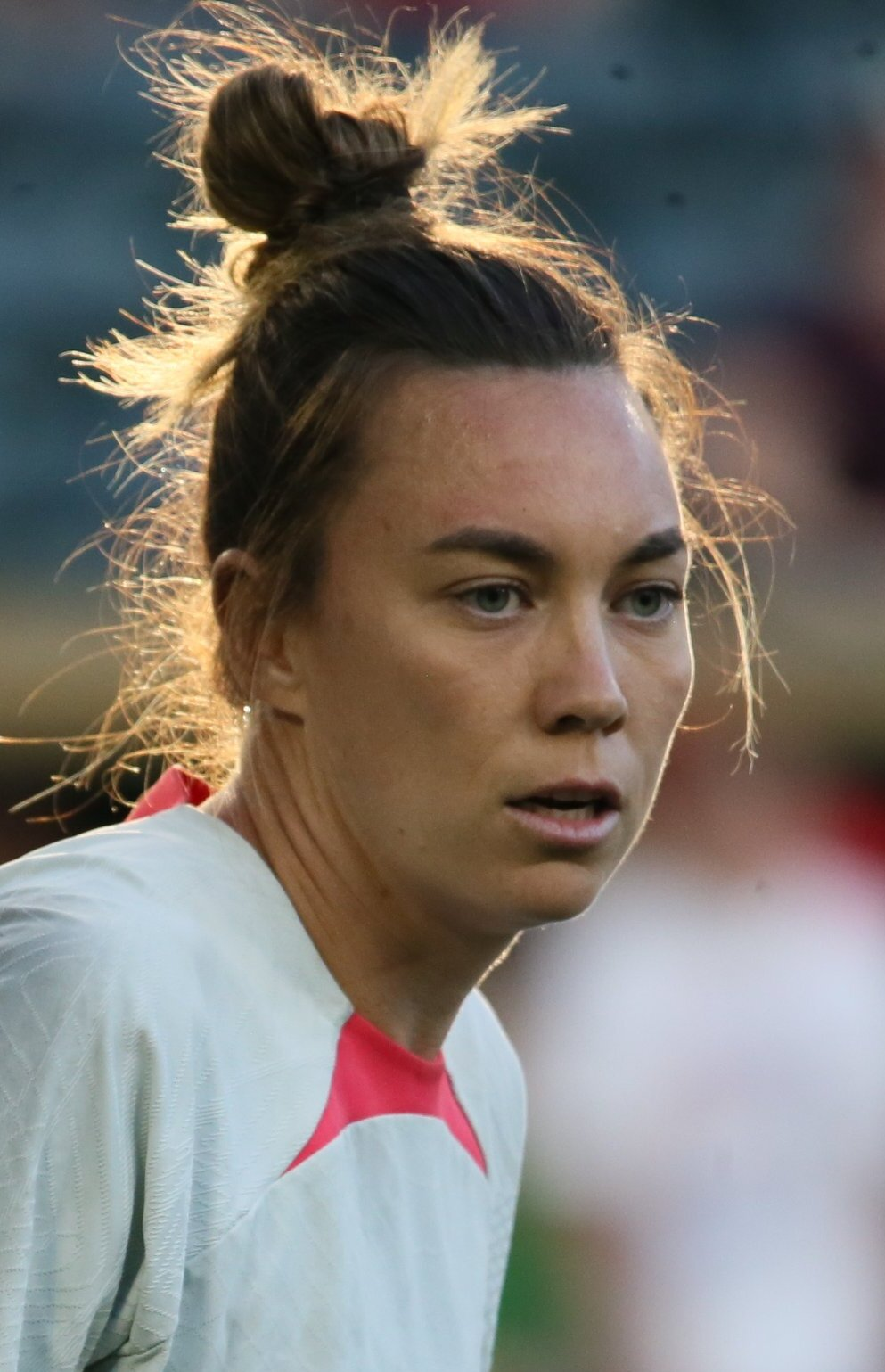
Arnold with the Portland Thorns in 2024

On 10 July 2024, Portland Thorns FC, an American professional women's soccer team based in Portland, announced that they had signed Arnold to a contract through the 2026 season with a mutual option for 2027.

== International career ==
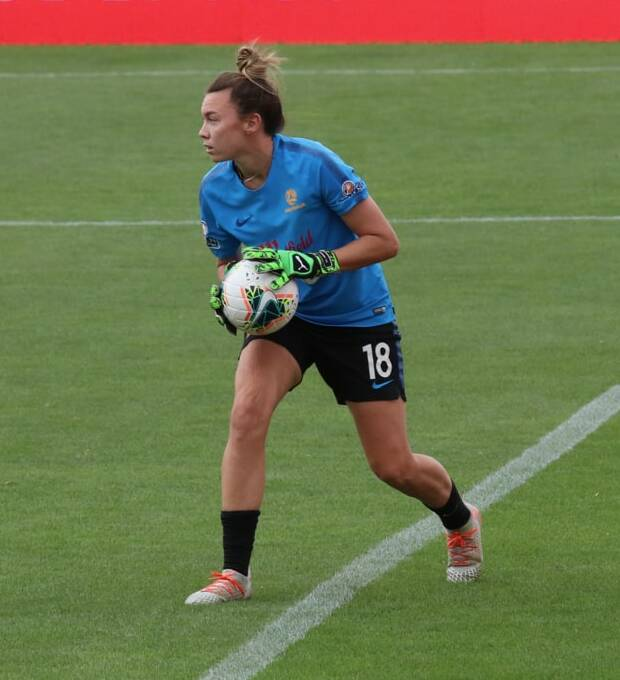
Arnold training with Australia in 2021

Arnold received her first call-up to the Australian national team for a tour of the United States in 2012. She made her debut in November that year, keeping a clean sheet in a win over Chinese Taipei in the 2013 EAFF Women's East Asian Cup preliminary round 2. Arnold began to feature regularly in national squads in 2013, with previous incumbent goalkeepers Melissa Barbieri and Lydia Williams unavailable. Following their returns, Arnold was not included in the national setup for some time, before returning for the 2015 Cyprus Cup in March 2015.

Arnold was included as one of three goalkeepers in the Matildas squad for the 2015 World Cup in Canada.

She was selected in the Australia squad for the 2016 Summer Olympics as one of two goalkeepers in the squad along with Lydia Williams, and played one match in the tournament, a group stage win over Zimbabwe.

Arnold was named to the Matildas squad for the 2019 World Cup in France.

Arnold was a member of the Matildas Tokyo 2020 Olympics squad. The Matildas qualified for the quarter-finals and beat Great Britain before being eliminated in the semi-final with Sweden. In the playoff for the Bronze medal they were beaten by the USA.

Arnold is a member of the Matildas 2023 FIFA Women's World Cup squad, goalkeeping for all of Australia's Group B matches. She was named player of the match after saving three spot kicks in the quarter-final penalty shoot out to see the Matildas progress to the final four for the first time. This led to many internet memes praising her performance, with some online describing her as the "Brick Wall" and the "Minister for Defence".

On 4 June 2024, Arnold was named in the Matildas team that qualified for the 2024 Paris Olympics, her third Olympic games selection.

Arnold was part of the Matildas squad which finished as runners-up at the 2026 AFC Women's Asian Cup following a 1–0 loss to Japan in the tournament's final on 21 March 2026.

== Personal life ==
Arnold dated Scottish footballer Kirsty Smith between 2022 and 2024 while they both played for West Ham.

Arnold supports the Brisbane Broncos in the National Rugby League (NRL).

== Career statistics ==
=== Club ===
As of match played 4 April 2026

Appearances and goals by club, season and competition
Club	Season	League			National Cup (Note: includes Norwegian Women's Cup, Women's FA Cup)		League Cup (Note: includes FA Women's League Cup)		Total	
Club	Season	Division	Apps	Goals	Apps	Goals	Apps	Goals	Apps	Goals
Perth Glory	2011–12	W-League	10	0	—		—		10	0
Canberra United	2012–13	W-League	10	0	—		—		10	0
Western Sydney Wanderers	2013–14	W-League	3	0	—		—		3	0
Perth Glory	2014–15	W-League	14	0	—		—		14	0
Perth Glory	2015–16	W-League	8	0	—		—		8	0
Perth Glory	Total		22	0	—		—		22	0
Brisbane Roar	2016–17	W-League	11	0	—		—		11	0
Brisbane Roar	2017–18	W-League	13	0	—		—		13	0
Brisbane Roar	2018–19	W-League	12	0	—		—		12	0
Brisbane Roar	2019–20	W-League	12	0	—		—		12	0
Brisbane Roar	Total		48	0	—		—		48	0
Arna-Bjørnar	2018	Toppserien	15	0	0	0	—		15	0
Chicago Red Stars	2019	NWSL	0	0	—		—		0	0
West Ham United	2020–21	Women's Super League	16	0	2	0	3	0	21	0
West Ham United	2021–22	Women's Super League	18	0	3	0	0	0	21	0
West Ham United	2022–23	Women's Super League	20	0	2	0	5	0	27	0
West Ham United	2023–24	Women's Super League	19	0	0	0	0	0	19	0
West Ham United	Total		73	0	7	0	8	0	80	0
Portland Thorns	2024	NWSL	5	0	—		—		5	0
Portland Thorns	2025	NWSL	21	0	—		—		21	0
Portland Thorns	2026	NWSL	2	0	—		—		2	0
Portland Thorns	Total		28	0	—		—		28	0
Career total			197	0	7	0	8	0	212	0

=== International ===
As of match played 10 October 2026

Appearances and goals by national team and year
National team	Year	Apps	Goals
Australia	2012	2	0
Australia	2013	0	0
Australia	2014	0	0
Australia	2015	4	0
Australia	2016	4	0
Australia	2017	4	0
Australia	2018	7	0
Australia	2019	2	0
Australia	2020	1	0
Australia	2021	3	0
Australia	2022	2	0
Australia	2023	15	0
Australia	2024	12	0
Australia	2025	4	0
Australia	2026	9	0
Total		70	0

== Honours ==
Australia

- AFC Olympic Qualifying Tournament: 2016
- FIFA Series: 2026

Perth Glory

- W-League Premiership: 2014

Brisbane Roar

- W-League Premiership: 2017–18

Individual

- W-League Goalkeeper of the Year: 2012–13, 2014, 2017–18
- West Ham United Player of the Year: 2023–24

== Bibliography ==
- Arnold, Mackenzie; Kemp, Emma (2024), MACCA : My story so far, Penguin Random House Australia, ISBN 978-1-76134-735-1

Arnold and sports writer Emma Kemp published Arnold's autobiography, titled Macca, on 8 October 2024.

== See also ==
- List of Perth Glory FC W-League players
- List of Western Sydney Wanderers Women players
- List of foreign FA Women's Super League players
