= Dimi Poulos =

Australian association footballer

Dimi Poulous
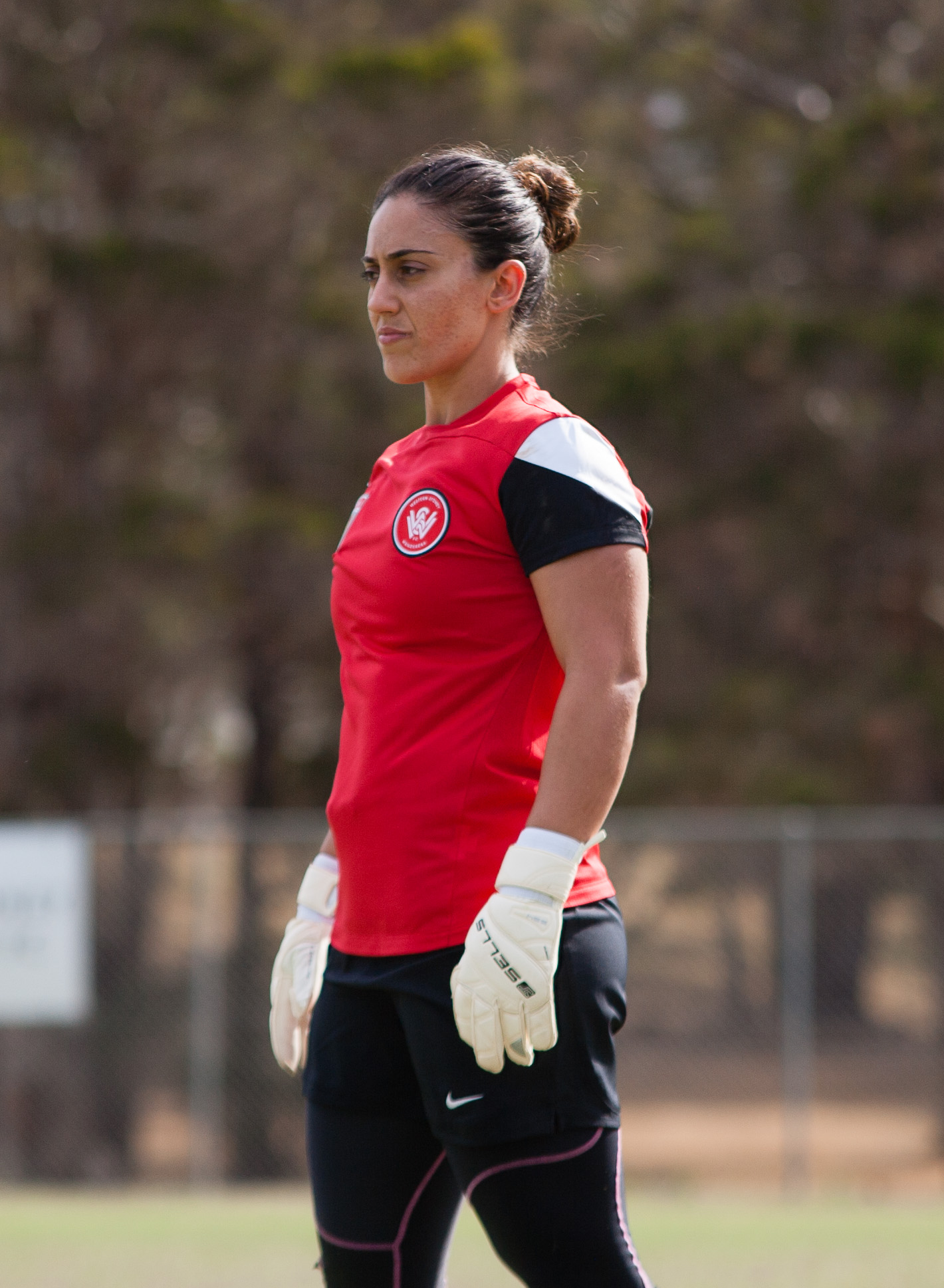
- Dimi Poulous in training for Western Sydney Wanderers

Personal information
- Full name: Dimitra Tsiliaskopoulos
- Date of birth: 28 October 1984 (age 42)
- Place of birth: Wollongong, Australia
- Height: 1.72 m (5 ft 7 1/2 in)
- Position: Goalkeeper

College career
Years	Team	Apps	(Gls)
2005–2008	Winthrop Eagles	78	

Senior career*
Years	Team	Apps	(Gls)
2002–2004	NSW Sapphires	11	(0)
- Chicago Red Eleven
2009	Quickstrike Lady Blues		
2009–2010	Sporting de Huelva		
2010–2011	Sydney FC	12	(0)
2013–2014	Western Sydney Wanderers	9	(0)
- * Club domestic league appearances and goals as of 3 March 2014

Dimitra Tsiliaskopoulos, better known as Dimi Poulos, is an Australian soccer goalkeeper who last played for Western Sydney Wanderers in the W-League, as an injury replacement for Young Matildas goalkeeper Mackenzie Arnold.

While still in high school, Poulos played for the Wollongong Wolves in the New South Wales Women's League. Poulos played for the New South Wales Sapphires in the Australian Women's National Soccer League between 2002 and 2004.

Poulos played college soccer with the Winthrop Eagles between 2005 and 2008. She was inducted into the Winthrop Athletics Hall of Fame in 2015.

She played in the American W-League and the Spanish league.
