= Hannah Beard =

English footballer

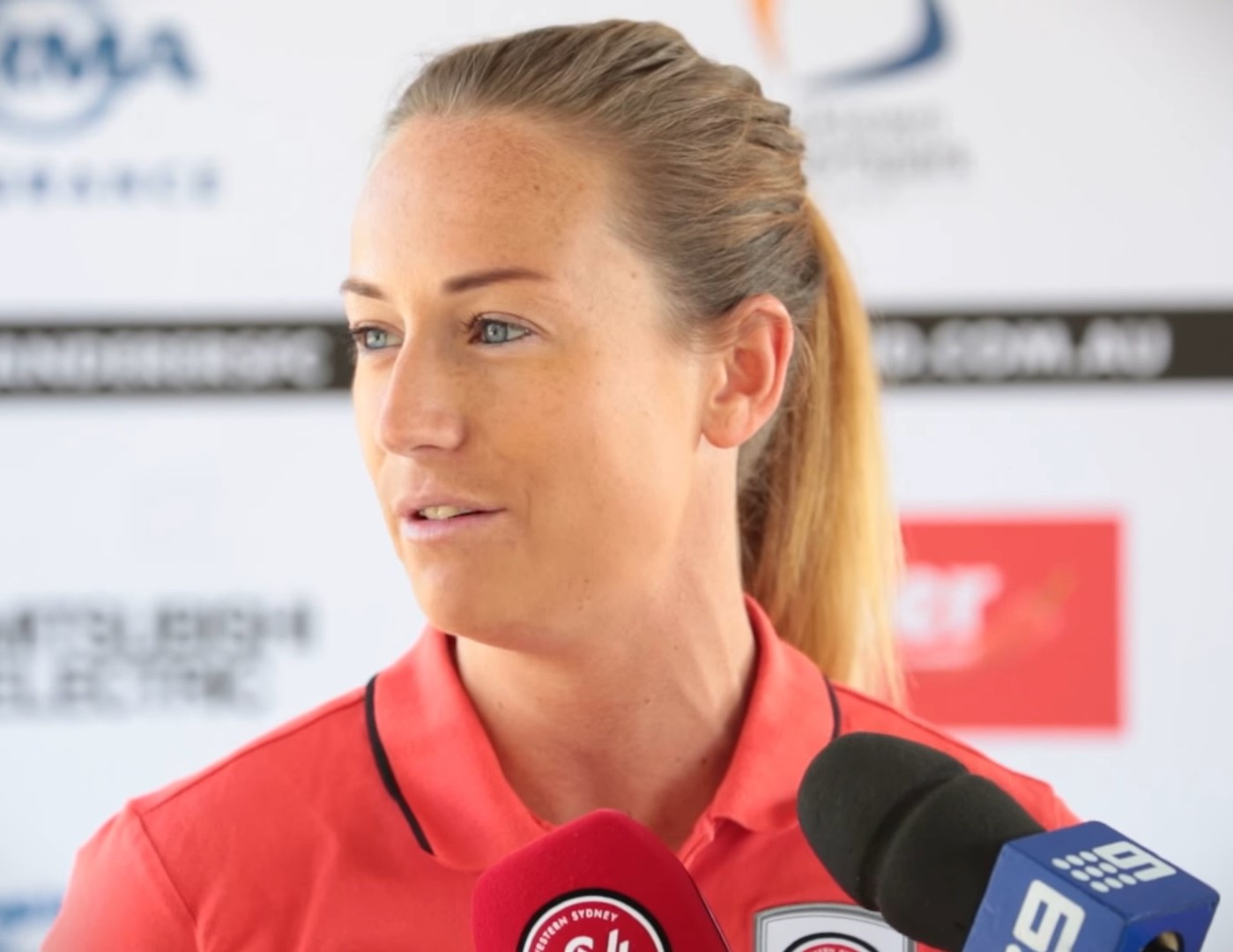
- Beard for Western Sydney Wanderers in 2015

Personal information
- Full name: Hannah Beard
- Date of birth: 22 August 1988 (age 38)
- Place of birth: England
- Position: Striker

Youth career
- Liverpool Ladies

College career
Years	Team	Apps	(Gls)
2006–2009	Saint Leo Lions	76	(46)

Senior career*
Years	Team	Apps	(Gls)
2004–2005	Liverpool Ladies		
2011	Santa Clarita Blue Heat		
2012	Durham		
2012	Los Angeles Strikers		
2012–2013	Brisbane Roar	9	(0)
2013–2014	Newcastle Jets	10	(2)
2014–2016	Western Sydney Wanderers	23	(3)
2018–2019	Illawarra Stingrays		
2020–2022	Northbridge Bulls		
2023–	UNSW FC		
- * Club domestic league appearances and goals as of 29 September 2017

Hannah Beard (born 22 August 1988) is an English association football player, who played for Liverpool Ladies in the English FA Women's Premier League, Santa Clarita Blue Heat and Los Angeles Strikers in the American USL W League, Brisbane Roar, Newcastle Jets, and Western Sydney Wanderers in the Australian W-League, and Illawarra Stingrays, North Shore Mariners, and UNSW FC in the National Premier Leagues NSW Women's. She also played college soccer for Saint Leo Lions.

== College career ==
Beard played in college for Saint Leo Lions in the Sunshine State Conference (SSC) for four years between 2006 and 2009. During here time, she won many accolades, including NSCAA All-American and SSC Player of the Year in 2008. She finished her college career as the program leader in games played, assists, points, and multiple-goal games after playing 76 games, scoring 46 goals including 10 multiple-goal games, and accumulating 31 assists and 123 total points. She was also an All-Sunshine State Conference selection every year and set numerous records, including single-season record for assists. In February 2024, Beard was inducted into the hall of fame, with her record assists in a single season still intact and while still the all-time leader in assists and games played.

== Personal life ==
Beard was born in Liverpool to an Everton-supporting family.

== Club career ==
=== Youth ===
From the age of 9 until 17, Beard played for Liverpool, making the senior squad in her last year and playing in the FA Women's Premier League.

=== United States ===
In 2011, Beard played for USL W League club Santa Clarita Blue Heat. She scored her debut goal as the first goal for the club in the season opener. She then continued to score goals periodically during the season.

In May 2012, Beard joined archrival Los Angeles Strikers after spending the off-season with English club Durham, where she was top-scorer.

=== Australia ===
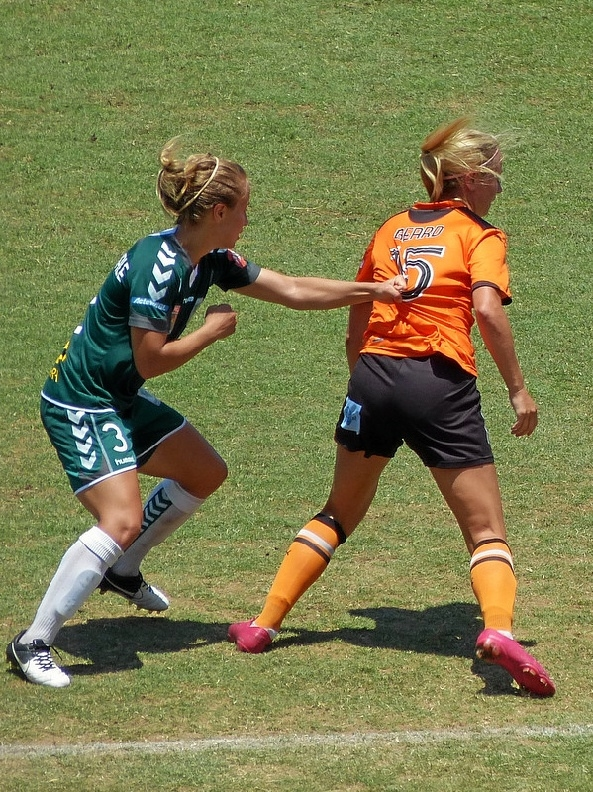
Beard (right) playing for Brisbane Roar in 2013

In October 2012, Beard moved to Australia, joining W-League club Brisbane Roar for the 2012–13 W-League season.

The following season, Beard joined Newcastle Jets.

For the 2014 W-League season, Beard joined Western Sydney Wanderers. Alongside American Keelin Winters, she was one of the two foreign players playing for the club that season. Both players extended with the club for the 2015–16 W-League season and were joined by two more visa signings. Following two seasons with the club, Beard departed ahead of the 2016–17 W-League season.

In 2018, Beard played for Illawarra Stingrays in the National Premier Leagues NSW Women's. She then re-signed with the club for the 2019 season. A notable point of the season was when after 10 weeks on the sidelines due to glandular fever, Beard returned to the field to score a hat-trick.

In 2020, Beard joined North Shore Mariners. She helped the club start the league positively, sitting top of the ladder after six matches, winning every one of them. She stayed with the club until 2022, with their name changing to Northbridge Bulls.

In September 2023, Beard re-signed with UNSW FC for another season with the club. She then re-signed for a third year in March 2024.
