= Shawna Gordon =

American soccer player (born 1990)

Personal information
- Full name: Shawna Gordon
- Date of birth: January 18, 1990 (age 36)
- Place of birth: Fontana, California, United States
- Height: 1.68 m (5 ft 6 in)
- Position: Central midfielder

College career
Years	Team	Apps	(Gls)
2008–2011	Long Beach State 49ers	89	(17)

Senior career*
Years	Team	Apps	(Gls)
2013	Boston Breakers	0	(0)
2013–2014	Western Sydney Wanderers	10	(1)
2014	Umeå IK	6	(0)
2015–2016	Sky Blue FC	21	(0)

International career
2007	United States U17		
- * Club domestic league appearances and goals as of September 2, 2015

Shawna Gordon (born January 18, 1990) is an American former professional soccer player. She played as a midfielder for the Boston Breakers and Sky Blue FC in America, the Western Sydney Wanderers in Australia, and Umeå IK in the Swedish Damallsvenskan.

== Early life ==
Born in Fontana, California, in San Bernardino County, Gordon was raised in the nearby city of Rancho Cucamonga. She attended Los Osos High School where she played for the varsity soccer team all four years and led the team to two league championships. Gordon was named to the league's first-team four times and was named most valuable player (MVP) as a senior.

Gordon played club soccer for the Arsenal and played in regional and Olympic Development Program (ODP) camps for five years. In 2006, she helped the '90 Cal South ODP team to an ODP national championship title and a second-place finish the following year.

=== Long Beach State 49ers, 2008–2011 ===
Gordon attended California State University, Long Beach where she played for the Long Beach State 49ers from 2008 to 2011 and helped lead the team to three Big West titles as well as three NCAA Tournament appearances. In 2011, the team advanced to the NCAA Elite Eight for the first time. The same year, Gordon was named Big West Conference Midfielder of the Year.

== Club career ==
=== 2013–14 ===
In 2013, Gordon signed with the Boston Breakers for the inaugural season of the National Women's Soccer League (NWSL), but did not make an appearance for the club.

Following the close of the 2013 NWSL season, Gordon joined the Western Sydney Wanders FC in Australia's W-League for the 2013–2014 season. In December 2013, she was named W-League Player of the Week after the team's 3–0 win over Perth Glory FC. Gordon made 10 starts for the club and scored one goal. The Wanderers finished in 7th place during the regular season with a 2–7–3 record.

In summer 2014, Gordon joined LA Blues in Los Angeles and helped lead the team to their fourth W-League championship. She scored five goals and served five assists during the season.

In the fall, Gordon joined Umeå IK in Sweden's Damallsvenskan for the 2014 season. She made six appearances for the club. Umeå finished in sixth place with a 8–9–3 record.

=== 2015–16 ===
In October 2014, Gordon signed with the NWSL side Sky Blue FC based in New Jersey. Of her signing, head coach Jim Gabarra said, "Shawna is a left-footed midfielder who is a great addition to our team. She is very good at set plays, and she has some good playing experience. Her experience at the professional level makes her someone who will add some nice depth to our team." During the 2015 season, she made 13 appearances for the club with 10 starts. Sky Blue finished in eighth place during the regular season with a 5–8–7 record.

== International career ==
Gordon has represented the United States on the under-17 national team. In 2008, she was called into training camp for the United States women's national under-20 soccer team.

== Personal life ==
Gordon dated actor Shemar Moore from 2014 to 2015.

Following her retirement from professional play, Gordon founded Football for Her, a nonprofit dedicated to providing girls a safe space to play soccer.
