= Renee Tomkins =

- Born: 17 April 1986 (age 40)
- Height: 176 cm (5 ft 9 in)
Australian rules football career
Personal information
- Original teams: Greater Western Sydney; East Coast Eagles
- Draft: No. 96, 2016 AFL Women's draft: Greater Western Sydney; No. 65 2018 AFL Women's draft: Greater Western Sydney
- Debut: Round 1, 2017, Greater Western Sydney vs. Adelaide, at Thebarton Oval
- Position: Defender
Playing career^{1}
Years	Club	Games (Goals)
2017–2019	Greater Western Sydney	12 (0)
- ^{1} Playing statistics correct to the end of the 2019 season.
Association football career
- Position: Midfielder
Senior career*
Years	Team	Apps	(Gls)
2013	Marconi Stallions	22	(1)
2013–2014	Western Sydney Wanderers	1	(0)
- * Club domestic league appearances and goals as of 16/04/2017

Renee Tomkins (born 17 April 1986) is an Australian former soccer player who last played for Western Sydney Wanderers in the Australian W-League, and an Australian rules footballer who last played for Greater Western Sydney. In 2015, she juggled soccer and Australian rules football commitments, playing for Penrith Ramettes along with Marconi Stallions. She retired from soccer in 2016, concentrating on Australian rules football. Tomkins was selected in the AFL Sydney team and went on to play in their match against Adelaide at the Adelaide Oval before nominating for the inaugural AFLW national draft.

== AFL Women's career ==
In 2017, Tomkins was drafted in the ninety-sixth overall pick by Greater Western Sydney in the 2016 AFL Women's draft, the team's twelfth pick. Tomkins had played just 17 games for her local club, Penrith Ramettes, prior to being drafted by the GWS Giants. She debuted in round 1 at center half back against Adelaide.

At the end of the 2017 AFL Women's season, Tomkins was nominated by her teammates for the AFL Players' Most Valuable Player Award and was listed in the All-Australian squad. In her inaugural season of AFLW with the Giants, Tomkins played in all seven matches and ran second in the club's best and fairest Gabrielle Trainor medal with 177 votes, just two behind winner, Victorian priority pick Jessica Dal Pos.

Greater Western Sydney signed Tomkins for the 2018 season during the trade period in May 2017. She was delisted by Greater Western Sydney at the end of the 2018 season but redrafted by the Giants with the 63rd overall pick in the 2018 draft.

In April 2019, Tomkins was delisted by Greater Western Sydney.
