= Alanna Kennedy =

Australian soccer player (born 1995)

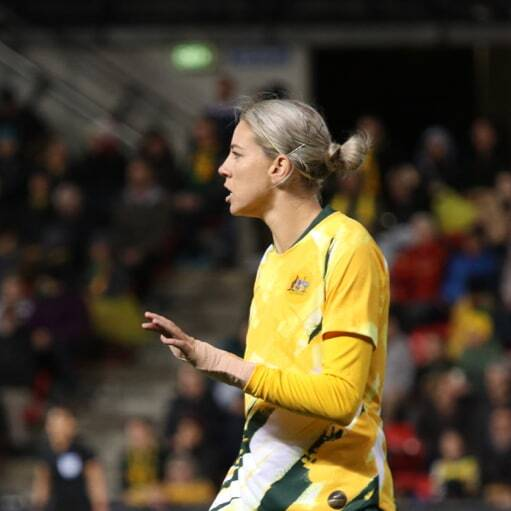
- Kennedy in 2021

Personal information
- Full name: Alanna Stephanie Kennedy
- Date of birth: 21 January 1995 (age 31)
- Place of birth: Campbelltown, New South Wales, Australia
- Height: 1.76 m (5 ft 9 in)
- Positions: Centre-back; defensive midfielder

Team information
- Current team: London City Lionesses
- Number: 33

Youth career
- Campbelltown Cobras

Senior career*
Years	Team	Apps	(Gls)
2010–2011	Sydney FC	1	(0)
2011–2012	Newcastle Jets	9	(1)
2012–2013	Sydney FC	12	(3)
2013–2014	Western Sydney Wanderers	9	(1)
2014–2015	Perth Glory	13	(2)
2015–2017	Sydney FC	24	(3)
2016	Western New York Flash	17	(0)
2017–2020	Orlando Pride	60	(8)
2017–2018	→ Melbourne City (loan)	14	(1)
2018–2020	→ Sydney FC (loan)	22	(3)
2020	→ Tottenham Hotspur (loan)	9	(0)
2021	Tottenham Hotspur	10	(1)
2021–2025	Manchester City	40	(1)
2025	Angel City FC	16	(1)
2025–	London City Lionesses	17	(1)

International career^{‡}
2008–2009	Australia U-17	10	(6)
2011–2014	Australia U-20	3	(0)
2012–	Australia	152	(18)
- * Club domestic league appearances and goals as of 4 September 2026 ‡ National team caps and goals as of 9 June 2026

Alanna Stephanie Kennedy (born 21 January 1995) is an Australian professional soccer player who plays as a defensive midfielder or centre-back for Women's Super League club London City Lionesses and the Australia national team.

== Early life ==
Kennedy was raised in Rosemeadow, New South Wales, a suburb of the Macarthur Region of South Western Sydney, and attended selective sports school Westfields Sports High School. As a youth, she was the only girl on an all-boys team and later played for the Campbelltown Cobras. She trained with the Girls Skills Acquisition Program (GSAP) at Macarthur Rams. Kennedy acknowledged the Rams training ground as her "second home" growing up.

== Club career ==
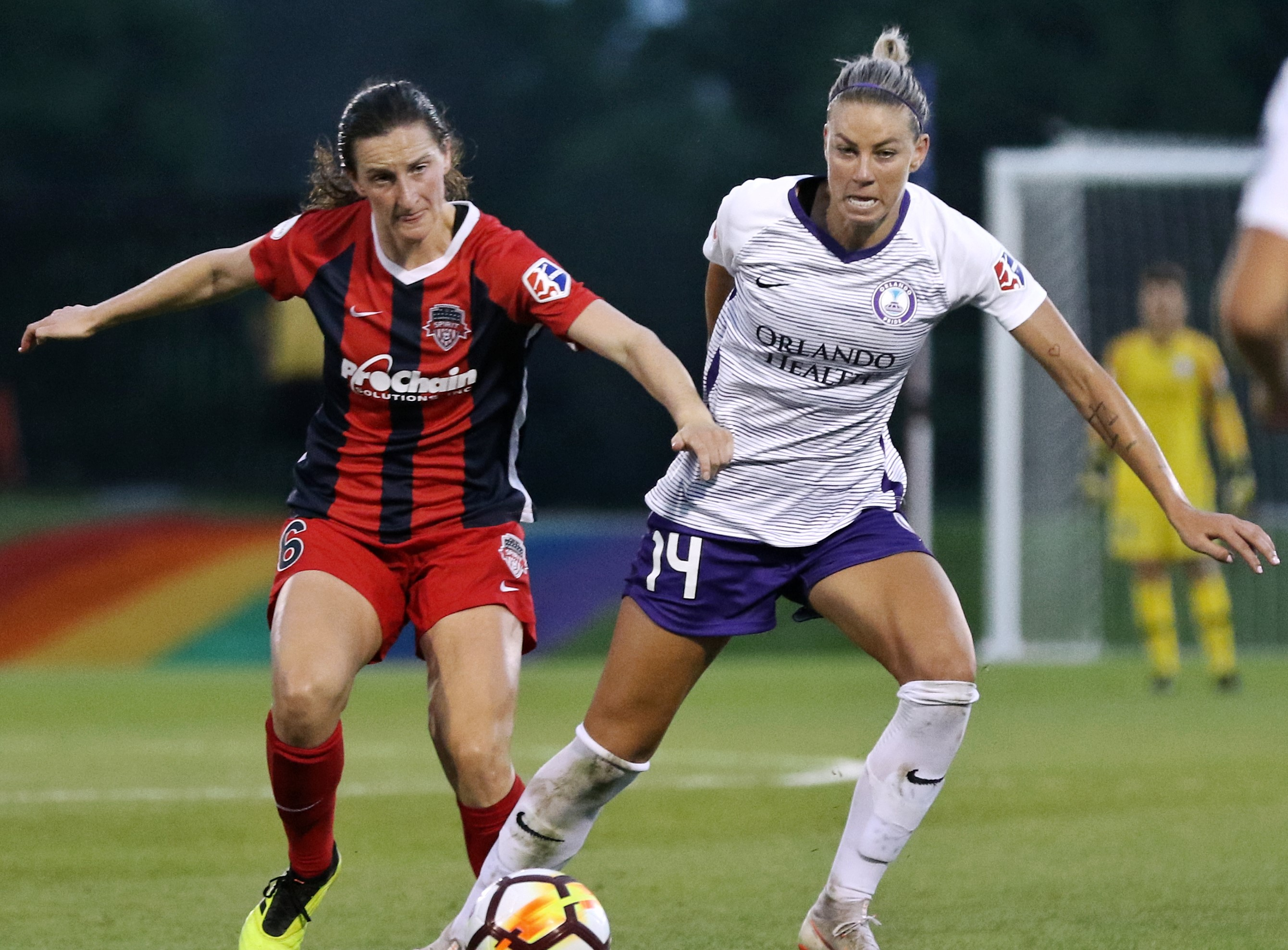
Kennedy (right) and Andi Sullivan fight for the ball in a match between Washington Spirit and Orlando Pride on 23 June 2018.

=== W-League beginnings ===
Kennedy started her W-League career playing for Sydney FC in the 2010–11 season, where she featured in 3 games. The following year, Kennedy switched clubs and joined the Newcastle Jets in the 2011–12 W-League before returning to Sydney FC in the 2012–13 season. For the 2013–14 season, she joined city rivals Western Sydney Wanderers, and in the 2014 season she joined Perth Glory. In 2015, she returned to Sydney FC and would remain there the following 2 seasons.

=== Western New York Flash and Orlando Pride ===
In 2016, Kennedy signed with the Western New York Flash in the National Women's Soccer League. She appeared in 17 games for the Flash in 2016. Kennedy played every minute of Western New York's two playoff games, as the Flash won the 2016 NWSL Championship.

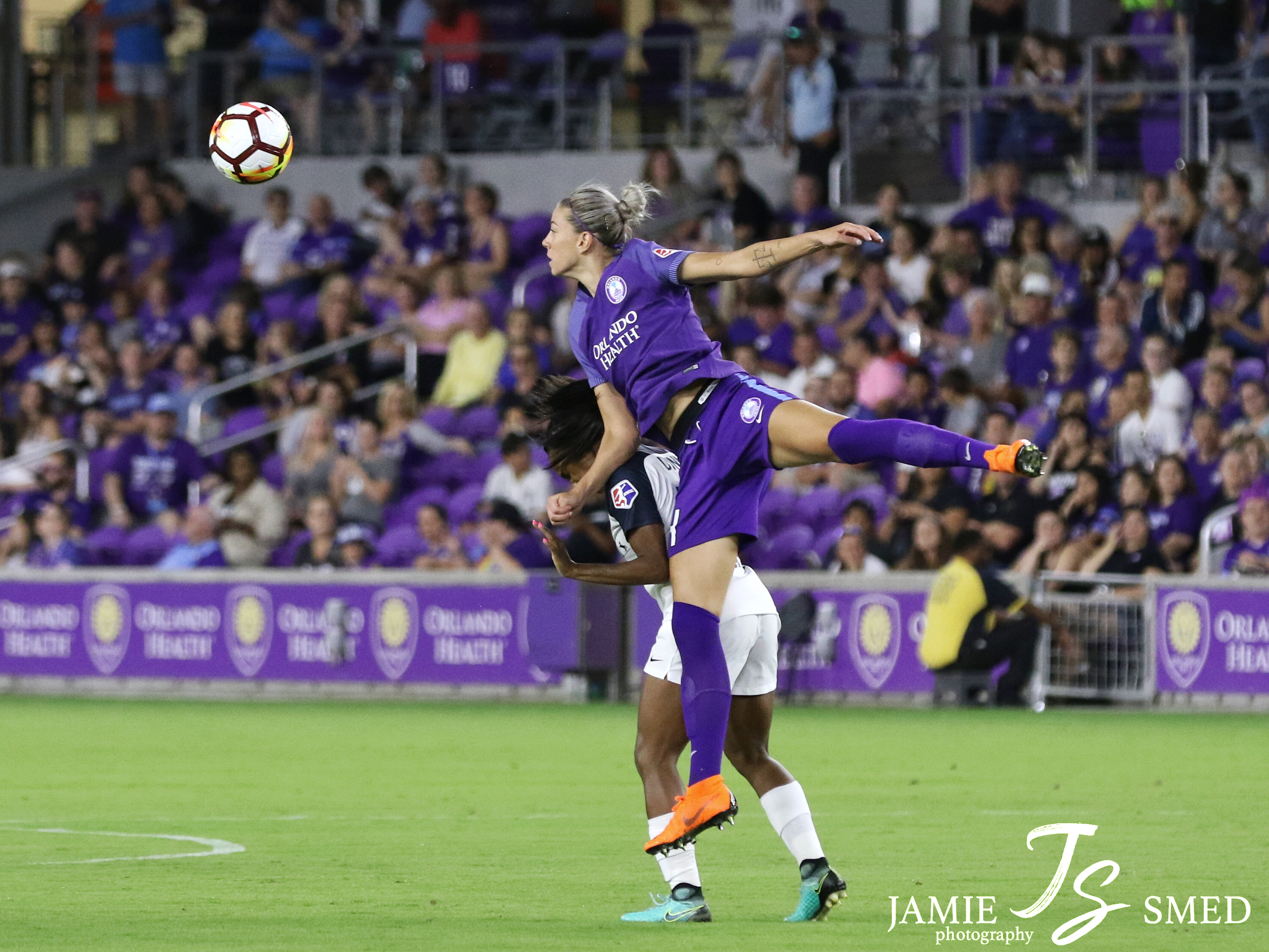
Kennedy heads the ball during an Orlando Pride match, May 2018

On 19 January 2017, Kennedy was traded to the Orlando Pride in exchange for midfielder Sam Witteman. She appeared in every game for the Pride in 2017. In the final game of the regular season on 30 September, Kennedy scored the game-winning goal on a free kick in stoppage time. This win allowed Orlando to finish the regular season in 3rd place and qualify for the playoffs for the first time in club history. In the semi-final, Kennedy scored again but Orlando lost 4–1 to the Portland Thorns.

In the 2018 NWSL season, Kennedy appeared in 20 games and scored 2 goals; however, Orlando could not repeat their success of 2017 and finished outside the playoffs.

In March 2020, the impending NWSL season was postponed due to the coronavirus pandemic. An eventual restart was made through a smaller schedule 2020 NWSL Challenge Cup tournament. However, on 22 June, Orlando withdrew from the tournament following positive COVID-19 tests among both players and staff.

=== Melbourne City FC ===
Kennedy joined Melbourne City on loan for the 2017–18 W-League season. During the 2017–2018 season, Kennedy was named to the Westfield W-League's "Team of the Decade", which was composed of the best XI players to ever play in the W-League, as voted for by the fans.

=== Sydney FC ===
After spending one season at Melbourne City, Kennedy signed with Sydney FC for the 2018–19 W-League season, returning to the club she had played at for four previous seasons. On 16 February 2019 Kennedy won her third W-league Championship title with a 4–2 win over Perth Glory in the grand final. She re-signed with Sydney FC for the 2019–20 season. The team returned to the grand final in 2020 but lost to Melbourne City 1–0.

=== Tottenham Hotspur ===
In August 2020, having been unable to feature for Orlando Pride in 2020 due to COVID-19 related issues, Kennedy moved to English FA WSL club Tottenham Hotspur on a six-month loan ahead of the 2020–21 season, with an option to make the move permanent.

On 12 November 2020, while on loan at Tottenham, Kennedy's NWSL playing rights were acquired by Racing Louisville FC in the 2020 NWSL Expansion Draft. Upon the expiration of her loan and NWSL contract in December 2020, Kennedy opted to remain in England and sign permanently with Tottenham until the end of the season.

Kennedy was released by Tottenham on 25 May 2021.

=== Manchester City ===
At the end of August 2021, Kennedy signed a two-year deal with Manchester City, joining national team-mate Hayley Raso. On 21 January 2025, Kennedy announced she was leaving the club after 3½ seasons.

=== Angel City ===
Kennedy signed a one-year deal, plus an option for an extra year, with Angel City FC in the NWSL on 21 January 2025. Kennedy made her debut with Angel City on 16 March, in the home-opener against San Diego Wave FC, which finished as a 1–1 draw. Kennedy recorded her first assist for Angel City on 9 May, setting up Christen Press' goal in a 2–0 victory against Utah Royals. Kennedy scored her first Angel City goal on 9 August, a stoppage-time equaliser to secure a 1–1 draw against San Diego Wave.

=== London City Lionesses ===
Kennedy returned to the Women's Super League by signing with newly promoted London City Lionesses for the 2025–26 season. On 4 September 2026, she was in the opening match of the season against Manchester United ending in a 2–1 win for London City at home. Showing tenacity, she set the tone in the first minute of the match with a strike that won LCL their first corner of the season.

== International career ==
Kennedy debuted for the Matildas against New Zealand in 2012. In 2014, at age 19, she was named to the Matildas squad for the 2014 AFC Women's Asian Cup. She appeared in three games, as Australia finished runner-up to Japan.

=== 2015 FIFA Women's World Cup ===
In May 2015, Kennedy was named to Australia's 23-player roster for the 2015 FIFA Women's World Cup and was the second youngest player on their roster. Kennedy appeared in all five matches for Australia. The Matildas finished second in their group and advanced to the knockout stage. They defeated Brazil in round 16 but lost to Japan in the quarter-finals.

=== 2016 Summer Olympics ===
Kennedy attended her first Olympic Games in 2016. She played every minute of Australia's four matches at Rio 2016. Their quarter-final match against Brazil was tied 0–0 after extra time and went to penalties. Kennedy was the final penalty taker for Australia; she did not score her penalty and Brazil won the match 7–6 on penalties.

Kennedy was part of the Matildas squad that won the 2017 Tournament of Nations and defeated the United States for the first time ever. At the 2018 AFC Women's Asian Cup Kennedy scored two goals for Australia. The second goal she scored was a stoppage time equalizer against Thailand in the Semi-final. Australia went on to win the game in penalties. Australia lost to Japan 1–0 in the final.

=== 2019 FIFA Women's World Cup ===
In May 2019, Kennedy was named to the Matildas squad for the 2019 FIFA Women's World Cup, the second time she was included in a World Cup squad. At the World Cup, Kennedy started all four of Australia's matches. In the Round of 16 tie against Norway, Kennedy received a straight red card in the 104th minute of extra-time for a DOGSO foul on Lisa-Marie Utland. Australia went on to lose on penalties and were eliminated.

=== 2020 Summer Olympics ===
Kennedy was a member of the Matildas Tokyo 2020 Olympics squad. The Matildas qualified for the quarter-finals and beat Great Britain before being eliminated in the semi-final with Sweden. In the playoff for the bronze medal, they were beaten by the USA.

=== 2023 FIFA Women's World Cup ===
In July 2023, Kennedy was named in the 23-player squad for the 2023 FIFA Women's World Cup, hosted on home soil.

=== 2024–present: Summer Olympics and after ===
On 4 June 2024, Kennedy was named in the Matildas team which qualified for the Paris 2024 Olympics, her third Olympic games selection. Australia were assigned to Group B in July. Due to losses against Germany and United States and a poor goal difference, they were eliminated. Kennedy had scored her team's first goal against Zambia, in their 6–5 win.

In October 2025, the defender was penalised with a red card and sent off for her foul tackle against Alessia Russo during a friendly against England held in Derby - the Lionesses defeated the Matildas 3–0.

Kennedy was named the Most Valuable Player of the 2026 AFC Women's Asian Cup after scoring five goals in the tournament, even though her team finished as runners‑up after a 1–0 defeat to Japan in the final.

== Style of play ==
Kennedy is recognised as being a versatile, technical player and is a right-footed free kick specialist. Known on the international level as a centre back, Kennedy also plays in the midfielder position.

== Personal life ==
Kennedy is openly lesbian. She was previously in a relationship with influencer Sophie Cachia, which Cachia described as being a toxic relationship, something that they "both contributed to".

== Career statistics ==
=== Club ===
As of match played 16 May 2026

Appearances and goals by club, season and competition
Club	Season	League			National cup (Note: includes Women's FA Cup)		League cup (Note: includes FA Women's League Cup)		Continental (Note: includes UEFA Women's Champions League)		Total	
Club	Season	Division	Apps	Goals	Apps	Goals	Apps	Goals	Apps	Goals	Apps	Goals
Sydney	2010–11	W-League	1	0	—		—		—		1	0
Newcastle Jets	2011–12	W-League	9	1	—		—		—		9	1
Sydney	2012–13	W-League	12	3	—		—		—		12	3
Western Sydney Wanderers	2013–14	W-League	9	0	—		—		—		9	0
Perth Glory	2014–15	W-League	13	2	—		—		—		13	2
Sydney	2015–16	W-League	12	1	—		—		—		12	1
Sydney	2016–17	W-League	12	2	—		—		—		12	2
Sydney	Total		68	9	0	0	0	0	0	0	68	9
Western New York Flash	2016	NWSL	17	0	—		—		—		17	0
Orlando Pride	2017	NWSL	25	5	—		—		—		25	5
Orlando Pride	2018	NWSL	20	2	—		—		—		20	2
Orlando Pride	2019	NWSL	15	1	—		—		—		15	1
Orlando Pride	Total		60	8	0	0	0	0	0	0	60	8
Melbourne City (loan)	2017–18	W-League	14	1	—		—		—		14	1
Sydney FC (loan)	2019–20	W-League	12	3	—		—		—		12	3
Tottenham Hotspur (loan)	2020–21	Women's Super League	19	1	1	1	3	1	—		23	3
Manchester City	2021–22	Women's Super League	14	1	4	0	4	0	0	0	22	1
Manchester City	2022–23	Women's Super League	2	0	1	0	4	0	0	0	7	0
Manchester City	2023–24	Women's Super League	17	0	1	0	2	0	—		20	0
Manchester City	2024–25	Women's Super League	7	0	0	0	0	0	8	1	15	1
Manchester City	Total		40	1	6	0	10	0	8	1	64	2
Angel City FC	2025	NWSL	16	1	—		—		—		16	1
London City Lionesses	2025–26	Women's Super League	16	1	1	0	3	0	—		20	1
Career total			262	25	8	1	16	1	8	1	294	28

=== International ===
As of match played 9 June 2026

Appearances and goals by national team and year
National team	Year	Apps	Goals
Australia	2012	7	0
Australia	2013	5	0
Australia	2014	8	0
Australia	2015	16	0
Australia	2016	12	2
Australia	2017	11	1
Australia	2018	15	3
Australia	2019	9	1
Australia	2020	4	0
Australia	2021	14	1
Australia	2022	7	0
Australia	2023	11	1
Australia	2024	13	2
Australia	2025	11	1
Australia	2026	10	6
Total		152	18

Scores and results list Australia's goal tally first, score column indicates score after each Kennedy goal.

List of international goals scored by Alanna Kennedy
No.	Date	Venue	Opponent	Score	Result	Competition
1	2 March 2016	Nagai Stadium, Osaka, Japan	Vietnam	3–0	9–0	2016 Olympics qualifying
2	9 August 2016	Itaipava Arena Fonte Nova, Salvador, Brazil	Zimbabwe	3–0	6–1	2016 Summer Olympics
3	7 March 2017	VRS António Sports Complex, Vila Real de Santo António, Portugal	Netherlands	3–0	3–2	2017 Algarve Cup
4	10 April 2018	Amman International Stadium, Amman, Jordan	Vietnam	2–0	8–0	2018 AFC Women's Asian Cup
5	17 April 2018	King Abdullah II Stadium, Amman, Jordan	Thailand	2–2	2–2	2018 AFC Women's Asian Cup
6	2 August 2018	Toyota Park, Bridgeview, Illinois, USA	Japan	1–0	2–0	2018 Tournament of Nations
7	6 March 2019	AAMI Park, Melbourne, Australia	Argentina	2–0	3–0	2019 Cup of Nations
8	30 July 2021	Kashima Soccer Stadium, Kashima, Japan	Great Britain	1–0	4–3	2020 Summer Olympics
9	27 July 2023	Lang Park, Brisbane, Australia	Nigeria	2–3	2–3	2023 FIFA Women's World Cup
10	28 July 2024	Stade de Nice, Nice, France	Zambia	1–1	6–5	2024 Summer Olympics
11	31 July 2024	Stade Vélodrome, Marseille, France	United States	1–2	1–2	2024 Summer Olympics
12	2 December 2025	Coopers Stadium, Adelaide, Australia	New Zealand	1–0	2–0	Friendly
13	5 March 2026	Gold Coast Stadium, Gold Coast, Australia	Iran	3–0	4–0	2026 AFC Women's Asian Cup
14	5 March 2026	Gold Coast Stadium, Gold Coast, Australia	Iran	4–0	4–0	2026 AFC Women's Asian Cup
15	8 March 2026	Stadium Australia, Sydney, Australia	South Korea	1–1	3–3	2026 AFC Women's Asian Cup
16	8 March 2026	Stadium Australia, Sydney, Australia	South Korea	3–3	3–3	2026 AFC Women's Asian Cup
17	13 March 2026	Perth Rectangular Stadium, Perth, Australia	North Korea	1–0	2–1	2026 AFC Women's Asian Cup
18	9 June 2026	CommBank Stadium, Sydney, Australia	Mexico	1–0	2–1	Friendly

== Honours ==
Sydney FC

- W-League Premiership: 2010–11
- W-League Championship: 2012–13, 2018–19

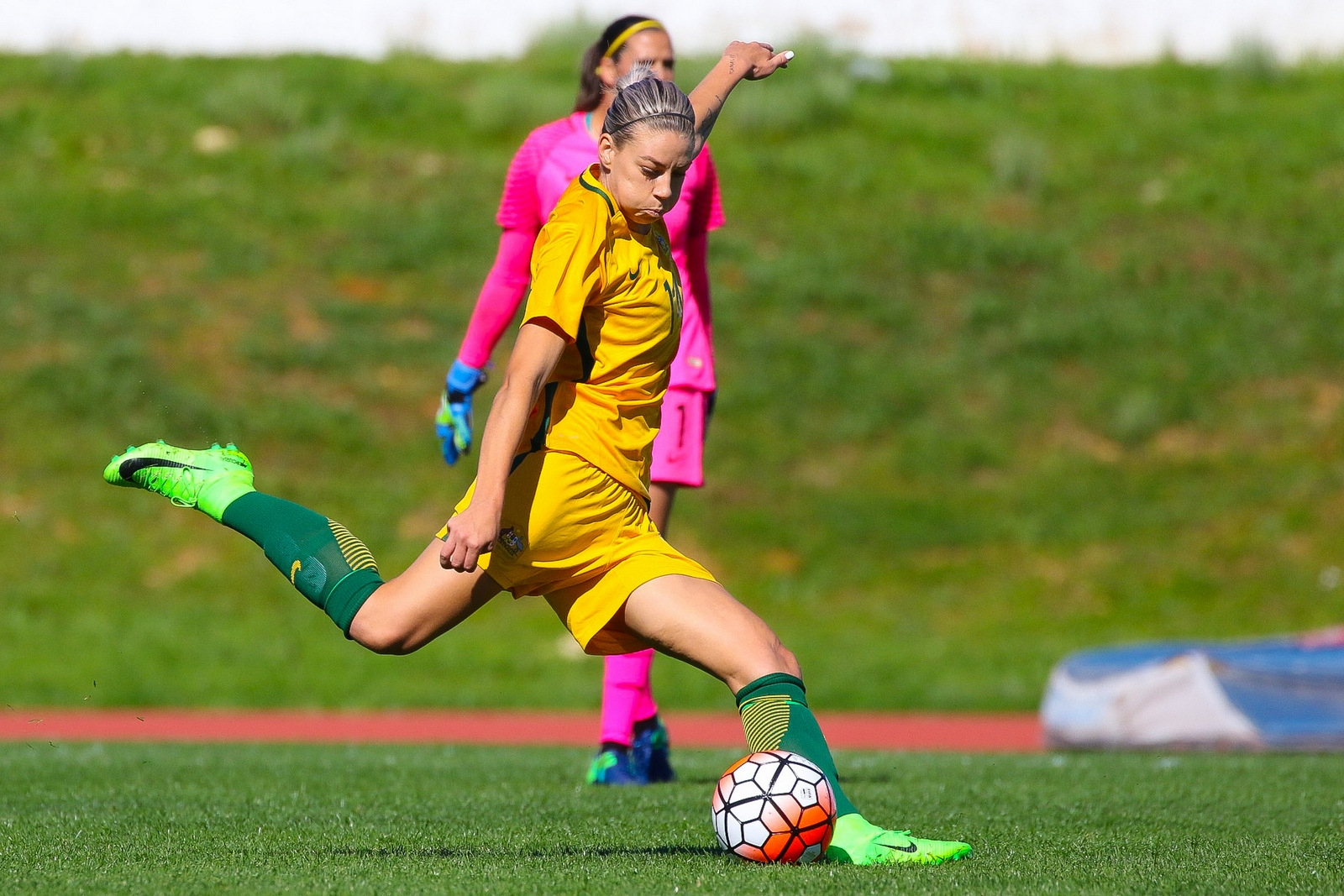

Perth Glory

- W-League Premiership: 2014–15

Western New York Flash

- National Women's Soccer League Championship: 2016

Melbourne City

- W-League Championship: 2017–18

Manchester City

- FA Women's League Cup: 2021–22

Australia

- AFF U-16 Women's Championship: 2009
- AFC Olympic Qualifying Tournament: 2016
- Tournament of Nations: 2017
- FFA Cup of Nations: 2019
- FIFA Series: 2026
- AFC Women's Asian Cup runner-up: 2026

Individual

- Sydney FC Player of the Year: 2015–16
- Orlando Pride 2017 Golden Swans: Coaches Award
- FIFPro 2017 Women's World XI shortlist: defender
- IFFHS AFC Woman Team of the Decade 2011–2020
- Little Athletics Australia Hall of Fame Inductee 2019 Little Athletics Australia
- AFC Women's Asian Cup MVP: 2026

== See also ==
- List of Perth Glory FC W-League players
- List of Western Sydney Wanderers Women players
- List of foreign FA Women's Super League players
- List of Orlando Pride records and statistics
- List of foreign NWSL players
- List of women's footballers with 100 or more international caps
