= Jordan Baker (soccer) =

Australian soccer player (born 1996)

Personal information
- Full name: Jordan Ashleigh Baker
- Date of birth: 1 November 1996 (age 30)
- Place of birth: Paddington, Sydney, Australia
- Height: 1.64 m (5 ft 4 1/2 in)
- Position: Striker

Youth career
- Gymea United
- 2007–2011: Sutherland Shire

Senior career*
Years	Team	Apps	(Gls)
2013	Illawarra Stingrays	21	(16)
2013–2016	Western Sydney Wanderers	10	(0)

International career
- Australia U-20
- * Club domestic league appearances and goals as of 11 October 2016

Jordan Ashleigh Baker (born 1 November 1996) is an Australian soccer player, who last played for Western Sydney Wanderers in the Australian W-League.

== Playing career ==
=== Soccer ===
Baker played youth football with Gymea United FC and Sutherland Shire FA from 2007 to 2011.

Baker played for Western Sydney Wanderers in the 2013–14 W-League and re-signed with the Wanderers for the 2014–15 W-League season.

Baker represented the Australia Schoolgirls and Australian under-20 teams.

Baker again was selected in the Wanderers squad for the 2015–16 W-League.

=== Rugby league ===
In 2017, Baker began playing rugby league, where she represented Cronulla-Sutherland Sharks in the NSWRL Women's Premiership. She was one of the competitions top-scorers in 2018.
