= Illawarra Stingrays WFC =

Illawarra Stingrays
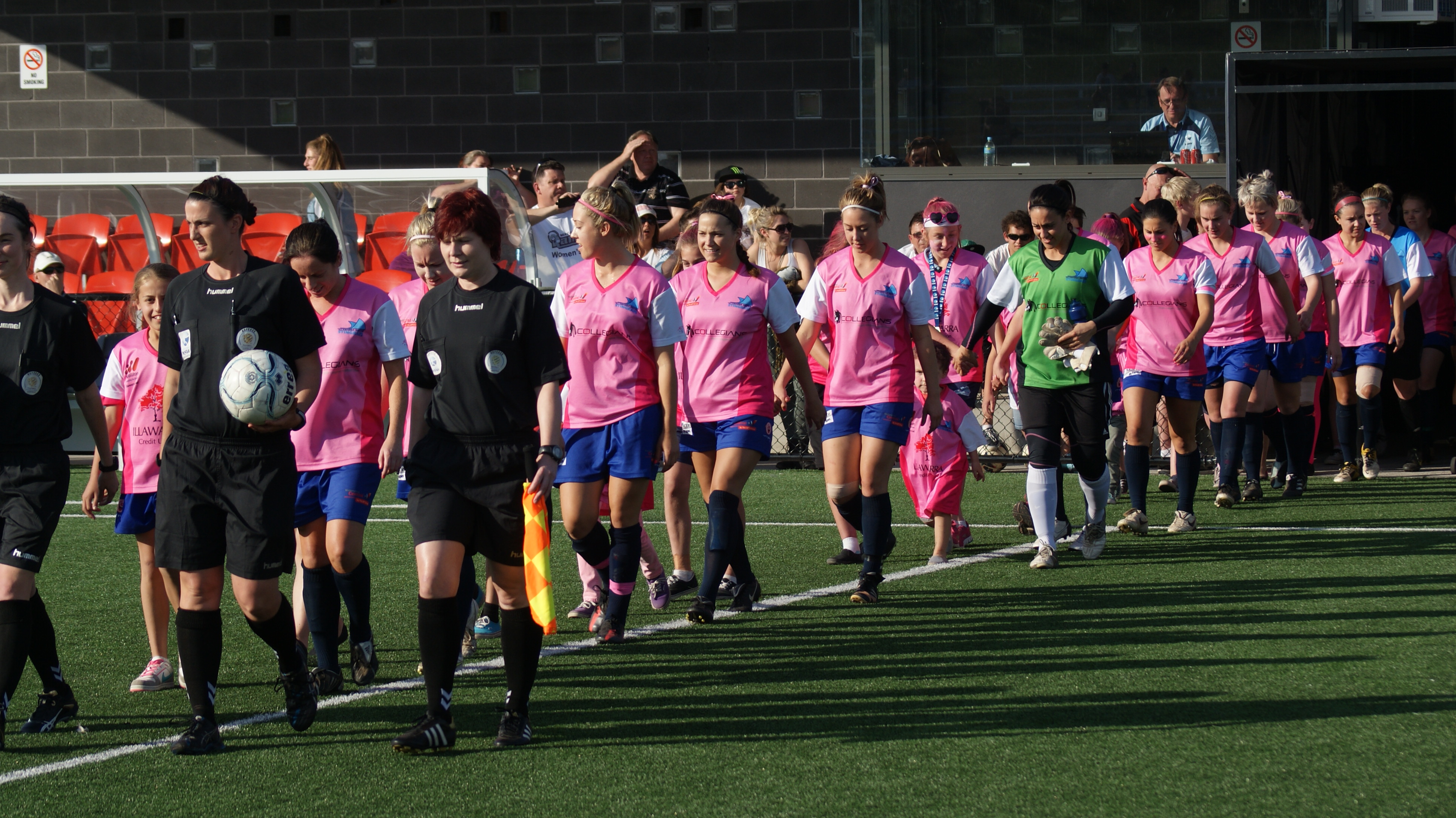
- at the 2012 NSW Women's Premier League Grand Final
- Full name: Stingrays Illawarra United Representative Football Club
- Nickname: The Stingrays
- Founded: 2006; 20 years ago
- Ground: Macedonia Park, Berkeley
- Owner: A member Association
- President: Kathy McDonogh
- League: National Premier Leagues NSW Women's
- Website: http://www.illawarrastingrays.com.au/

Illawarra Stingrays FC are a soccer team based in the Illawarra, New South Wales. They compete in the National Premier Leagues NSW Women's or highest state level tier of women’s soccer within Football NSW. The club was founded in 2006 and is a member based association.

== Foundation ==
The Illawarra Stingrays were developed through a partnership between the Illawarra Junior Soccer Association (IJSA) and the Illawarra Women’s Soccer Association (IWSA) in 2006 to promote and develop elite female football in the area.

Although the Illawarra Women's Soccer Association (IWSA) was merged to become part of Football South Coast, the Illawarra Stingrays remained independent as the recognised entity in the Illawarra to represent elite level women's football.

== Colours and badge ==
The primary club colour of Illawarra Stingrays is pink, which represents that the club is a women's only club. The secondary club colour is sky blue, with additional contrasting colours of navy blue and white.

The Illawarra Stingray logo features a stingray and a football set over the ray's tail.

== Honours ==
- NSW National Premier Leagues Women’s regular season

League Champions: 2009 (winning 6 -1 against Macarthur Rams), 2010 (winning 2 -0 against Inter Lions) and 2011 NSW State League Women's
Minor Premiers: 2009 2010 2011 NSW State League Women's

Runners Up: 2013 NSW State League Women's
Under 17s Premiers: 2014 NSW National Premier Leagues Women’s
Preseason Cup: 2014 2015 NSW National Premier Leagues Women’s

== Home Ground ==
The home ground of the Illawarra Stingrays is Lakelands Oval, Dapto, from 2026. The club have been actively campaigning to be granted a home ground by their local council.

== Representative Players ==
The Illawarra Stingrays are a strong development team and have supported the Matildas, Junior Matildas, State Representatives and W League players, including:

- Margaux Chauvet – Western Sydney Wanderers FC (A-League Women)
- Caitlin Cooper – Matildas, Western Sydney Wanderers FC (A-League Women)
- Mary Fowler – Matildas, Manchester City
- Erica Halloway – Western Sydney Wanderers FC (A-League Women)
- Michelle Heyman – Matildas, Canberra United in the A-League Women. 2007 Leading goal-scorer for the Illawarra Stingrays in the FNSW Super League competition and club player of the year; 2009 Golden Boot in the FNSW Women's Premier League and Player of the Year; 2010 leading goal-scorer for Illawarra Stingrays.
- Danika Matos – Western Sydney Wanderers FC (A-League Women)
- Chloe Middleton – Western Sydney Wanderers FC (A-League Women)

== Other ==
The Illawarra Stingrays played the Australia women's national soccer team in 2016 in an Olympic qualifying preparation match. Michelle Heyman and Caitlin Cooper were both in the Matildas squad that played against their local team.
