= Rachael Soutar =

Australian soccer player

Personal information
- Full name: Rachael Ann Soutar
- Date of birth: 8 April 1994 (age 32)
- Place of birth: Wahroonga, Sydney, Australia
- Height: 1.79 m (5 ft 10 1/2 in)
- Position: Defender

Youth career
- 1998–2009: Wahroonga Tigers

Senior career*
Years	Team	Apps	(Gls)
2011–2012	Sydney FC	1	(0)
2012–2016	Western Sydney Wanderers	33	(0)
2017–2019	Sydney FC	10	(0)

International career
- Australia U20
- * Club domestic league appearances and goals as of 21 February 2018

Rachael Ann Patterson (Soutar) (born 8 April 1994) is an Australian association football player, who played for Sydney FC and Western Sydney Wanderers in the Australian W-League.

== Early life ==
Soutar attended Pymble Ladies' College.

== Career ==
=== Western Sydney Wanderers ===
In 2012, Soutar was named as in the Western Sydney Wanderers squad for their inaugural W-League season. She left Western Sydney Wanderers ahead of the 2016–17 W-League season.

=== Return to Sydney FC ===
Soutar returned to Sydney FC ahead of the 2017–18 season.
