= Helen Caceres =

Australian association football player

Personal information
- Full name: Helen Caceres
- Date of birth: 15 June 1993 (age 33)
- Place of birth: Fairfield, Australia
- Height: 1.64 m (5 ft 4 1/2 in)
- Position: Striker

Youth career
- 2003–2010: Marconi Stallions

Senior career*
Years	Team	Apps	(Gls)
2010–2012	Marconi Stallions		
2012–2017	Western Sydney Wanderers	40	(4)
2018–2019	Melbourne City	11	(1)
- * Club domestic league appearances and goals

Helen Caceres (née Petinos; born 15 June 1993) is an Australian former soccer player who played as a striker. She made 51 appearances and scored five goals in the A-League Women (previously known as the W-League) for Melbourne City and Western Sydney Wanderers.

== Playing career ==
Petinos grew up in Western Sydney and played junior football in her hometown of Liverpool, New South Wales. She then joined Marconi Stallions - where she made a name for herself in the NSW Premier League. After nine years with the Stallions, she signed her first W-League contract with Western Sydney Wanderers in 2012.

Petinos made her debut for the Western Sydney Wanderers on 17 November 2013 in a match against Canberra United. She made 11 appearances for the team during the 2013–14 W-League season, scoring a single goal during a 3–0 win against Perth Glory on 14 December 2013.

During the 2014–15 W-League season, Petinos made 12 appearances and scored two goals.

After spending four seasons at Western Sydney, as well as a year away from the W-League due to living overseas in United Arab Emirates, Petinos signed with Melbourne City for the 2018–19 W-League season.

== Personal life ==
Helen is married to Sydney FC midfielder Anthony Cáceres (married 2 June 2018) whom she met at Westfields Sports High School. She is of Greek descent.

They are the first wife and husband to play at the same club in the A-Leagues.
