= Michelle Carney =

Australian football player (born 1981)

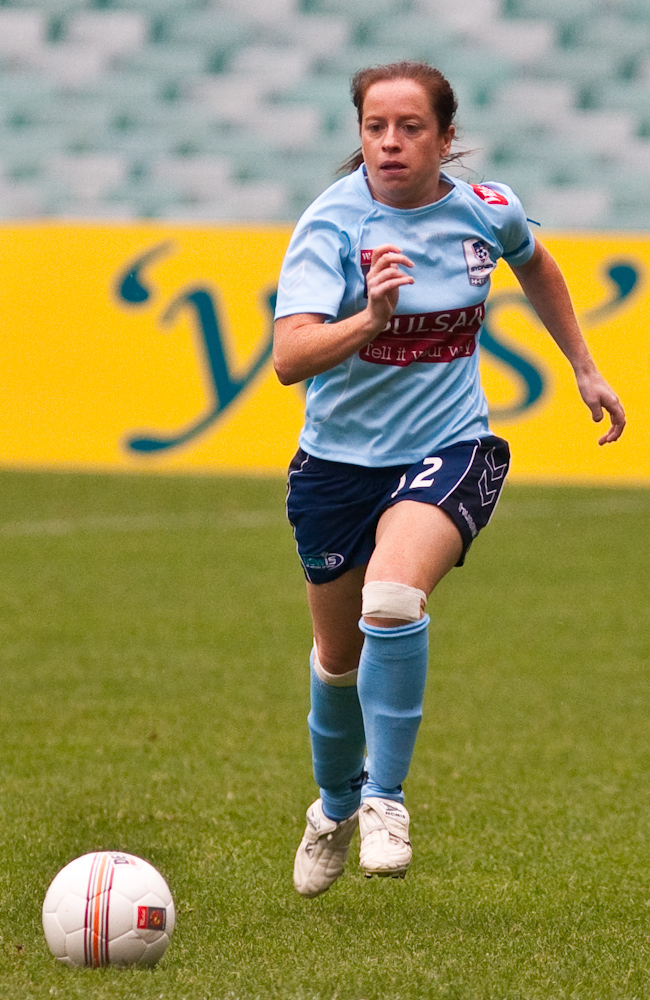
- Carney playing for Sydney FC in 2009

Personal information
- Full name: Michelle Carney
- Date of birth: 30 December 1981 (age 44)
- Place of birth: Camden, Australia
- Height: 1.59 m (5 ft 2 1/2 in)
- Position: Striker

Youth career
- 1998–2005: NSW Sapphires

Senior career*
Years	Team	Apps	(Gls)
2009–2010	Sydney FC	10	(1)
2013	Illawarra Stingrays	26	(46)
2013–2016	Western Sydney Wanderers FC	34	(8)
- * Club domestic league appearances and goals as of 29 September 2017

Michelle Carney (born 30 December 1981) is an Australian association football player who last played for Australian W-League team Western Sydney Wanderers.

Carney signed with Western Sydney Wanderers following a three-season hiatus. She left Western Sydney Wanderers ahead of the 2016–17 W-League season.

She is the older sister of Socceroo player David Carney.

== Honours ==
With Sydney FC:

- (Australia) 2009
- (Australia) W-League Championship: 2009
