= 2026–27 London City Lionesses season =

English women's football club season

London City Lionesses
2026–27 season
- Owner: Michele Kang
- Manager: Eder Maestre
- Stadium: Hayes Lane, Bromley

The 2026–27 season is London City Lionesses' 7th season in existence and their second season in the Women's Super League, the highest level of the football pyramid. Along with competing in the WSL, the club will also contest two domestic cup competitions: the FA Cup and the WSL Players Cup .

== Squad ==
As of 4 September 2026

Note: Flags indicate national team as defined under FIFA eligibility rules; some limited exceptions apply. Players may hold more than one non-FIFA nationality.

No.	Pos.	Nation	Player
2	DF	ESP	Jana Fernández
3	DF	ENG	Poppy Pattinson
4	DF	NED	Isa Kardinaal
6	MF	ESP	María Pérez
7	DF	ESP	Lucía Corrales
9	FW	SWE	Kosovare Asllani
10	MF	NED	Daniëlle van de Donk (vice-captain)
11	MF	ESP	Alexia Putellas (captain)
13	DF	ITA	Elena Linari (vice-captain)
14	FW	ENG	Freya Godfrey
16	MF	ESP	Daniela Arques
17	FW	ENG	Nikita Parris
19	FW	GER	Nicole Anyomi
20	FW	FRA	Delphine Cascarino

No.	Pos.	Nation	Player
21	FW	FRA	Kadidiatou Diani
23	FW	ENG	Isobel Goodwin
27	GK	ENG	Mary Earps
28	GK	ENG	Sophie Hillyerd
30	MF	DEN	Malou Marcetto
33	DF	AUS	Alanna Kennedy
35	GK	ENG	Sophia Poor
44	DF	ESP	Mapi León
76	FW	SWE	Rosa Kafaji
77	GK	ESP	Elene Lete
88	MF	FRA	Grace Geyoro
97	DF	DEN	Janni Thomsen
99	DF	USA	Corinne Henson

== Pre-season ==
29 August 2026	OL Lyonnes	4–0	London City Lionesses	Décines-Charpieu
CEST (UTC+2)	Weir 38', 42'; Dumornay 47', 63'	Report		Stadium: Groupama OL Training Center

== Competitions ==
=== Women's Super League ===
==== Matches ====
The league fixtures were released on 30 July 2026.

Win Draw Loss Fixtures

4 September 2026 1	London City Lionesses	2–1	Manchester United	Bromley
19:00 BST	Zigiotti Olme 9' (o.g.); Godfrey (yellow card) 76'; Van de Donk 82'	Report	Zigiotti Olme (yellow card) 30'; Awujo 90+10'	Stadium: Hayes Lane; Attendance: 5,402; Referee: Emily Heaslip

12 September 2026 2	West Ham United	2–1	London City Lionesses	Dagenham
12:45 BST	Gago 21', (yellow card) 79'; Asseyi 48'	Report	van de Donk 74'; Geyoro (yellow card) 75'	Stadium: Victoria Road; Attendance: 1,638; Referee: Richard Eley

19 September 2026 3	Charlton Athletic	1–4	London City Lionesses	Charlton
12:30 BST	Hutton 39'; Robe (yellow card) 40'; Mason (yellow card) 54'; Davidson (yellow card) 70'	Report	Goodwin 13', 15'; Fernández 44'; Anyomi 76'	Stadium: The Valley; Attendance: 1,886; Referee: Kirsty Dowle

26 September 2026 4	London City Lionesses	2–0	Brighton & Hove Albion	Bromley
17:00 BST	Putellas 29'; León (yellow card) 75'; Geyoro (yellow card) 88'; Corrales 90+2'	Report	Hayes (yellow card) 18'; Vanegas (yellow card) 53'; George (yellow card) 65'	Stadium: Hayes Lane; Attendance: 4177; Referee: Phoebe Cross

4 October 2026 5	Tottenham Hotspur	1–6	London City Lionesses	Leyton
12:00 BST	Pelova 54'; Gaupset (yellow card) 69'	Report	Putellas 3', 34'; Diani 22', 74'; van de Donk 52'; Cascarino 90+4'	Stadium: Brisbane Road; Attendance: 2,377; Referee: Megan Wilson

18 October 2026 6	London City Lionesses	2–1	Everton	Bromley
14:00 BST	Cascarino 24'; Godfrey 35'; Anyomi (yellow card) 79'	Report	Cain 71'	Stadium: Hayes Lane; Attendance: 4,044; Referee: Sophie Dennington

25 October 2026 7	Liverpool	2–2	London City Lionesses	St Helens
14:00 GMT	Olsson (yellow card) 19'; Fernández 90+2' (o.g.); Itamura (yellow card) 90+3'	Report	van de Donk (yellow card) 17'; Godfrey 22'; Diani 44'; Fernández (yellow card) 69'	Stadium: St Helens Stadium; Referee: Melissa Burgin

1 November 2026 8	London City Lionesses	1–2	Manchester City	Bromley
14:00 GMT	Goodwin (yellow card) 31'; Fernández 72'	Report	Hemp (yellow card) 49', (goal) 74'; Shaw 53'; Knaak (yellow card) 57'	Stadium: Hayes Lane; Attendance: 5,233; Referee: Lisa Benn

8 November 2026 9	London City Lionesses	4–1	Birmingham City	Bromley
14:30 GMT	Pattinson 10'; Cascarino 16' (yellow card) 27'; Pérez (yellow card) 37'; Geyoro 74'; Arques (yellow card) 81'; Diani 90+2'		Hurtré 50'; Herron (yellow card) 72'	Stadium: Hayes Lane; Referee: Phoebe Cross

15 November 2026 10	Arsenal	1–1	London City Lionesses	Holloway
16:30 GMT	Maanum 10'	Report	Goodwin 11'; Fernández (yellow card) 57'	Stadium: Emirates Stadium; Referee: Melissa Burgin

21 November 2026 11	London City Lionesses	6–2	Crystal Palace	Bromley
17:15 GMT	van de Donk 14', 54'; Pérez (yellow card) 38'; Putellas 51', 89'; Kennedy 73'; Goodwin 77'; León (yellow card) 84'	Report	Larkin 24'; Napier (yellow card) 56'; Blanchard 64'; Everett (yellow card) 79'	Stadium: Hayes Lane; Attendance: 4,074; Referee: Grace Lowe

13 December 2026 12	Chelsea	v	London City Lionesses	Fulham
14:00 GMT				Stadium: Stamford Bridge

20 December 2026 13	Aston Villa	v	London City Lionesses	Aston
14:00 GMT				Stadium: Villa Park

10 January 2027 14	London City Lionesses	v	West Ham United	Bromley
14:00 GMT				Stadium: Hayes Lane

20 January 2027 15	Everton	v	London City Lionesses	Liverpool
19:00 GMT				Stadium: Goodison Park

24 January 2027 16	London City Lionesses	v	Arsenal	Bromley
14:00 GMT				Stadium: Hayes Lane

31 January 2027 17	Manchester United	v	London City Lionesses	Leigh
13:00 GMT				Stadium: Leigh Sports Village

7 February 2027 18	Crystal Palace	v	London City Lionesses	Sutton
14:00 GMT				Stadium: Gander Green Lane

14 February 2027 19	London City Lionesses	v	Chelsea	Bromley
14:00 GMT				Stadium: Hayes Lane

14 March 2027 20	London City Lionesses	v	Liverpool	Bromley
14:00 GMT				Stadium: Hayes Lane

17 March 2027 21	Brighton	v	London City Lionesses	Crawley
19:45 GMT				Stadium: Broadfield Stadium

28 March 2027 22	Birmingham City	v	London City Lionesses	Birmingham (Bordesley)
14:00 BST				Stadium: St Andrew's

4 April 2027 23	London City Lionesses	v	Charlton Athletic	Bromley
14:00 BST				Stadium: Hayes Lane

2 May 2027 24	London City Lionesses	v	Tottenham Hotspur	Bromley
14:00 BST				Stadium: Hayes Lane

9 May 2027 25	Manchester City	v	London City Lionesses	Manchester
14:00 BST				Stadium: Academy Stadium

22 May 2027 TBC 26	London City Lionesses	v	Aston Villa	Bromley
TBC				Stadium: Hayes Lane

==== League table ====
Pos	Team	Pld	W	D	L	GF	GA	GD	Pts	Qualification or relegation
1	Chelsea	11	8	3	0	29	5	+24	27	Qualification for the Champions League league phase
2	Manchester City	11	8	1	2	28	14	+14	25	Qualification for the Champions League league phase
3	London City Lionesses	11	7	2	2	31	14	+17	23	Qualification for the Champions League third qualifying round
4	Manchester United	11	6	3	2	14	12	+2	21	
5	Tottenham Hotspur	11	6	2	3	28	19	+9	20	

Updated to match(es) played on 22 November 2026. Source: Women's Super League Table
Rules for classification: 1) Points; 2) Goal difference; 3) Number of goals scored.

==== Results summary ====
Overall								Home						Away					
Pld	W	D	L	GF	GA	GD	Pts	W	D	L	GF	GA	GD	W	D	L	GF	GA	GD
6	5	0	1	17	6	+11	15	3	0	0	6	2	+4	2	0	1	11	4	+7

Last updated: 18 October 2026.
Source: WSL Football

==== Results by matchday ====
Matchday	1	2	3	4	5	6	7	8	9	10	11	12	13	14	15	16	17	18	19	20	21	22	23	24	25	26
Ground	H	A	A	H	A	H	A	H	H	A	H	A	A	H	A	H	A	A	H	H	A	A	H	H	A	H
Result	W	L	W	W	W	W	D	L	W	D	W															
Position	4	3	4	4	3	3	3	3	3	3	3															

Updated to match(es) played on 21 November 2026. Source: WSL Football
A = Away; H = Home; W = Win; D = Draw; L = Loss; P = Postponed

=== FA Cup ===
As a member of the top tier, London City Lionesses will enter the FA Cup in the fourth round.

=== WSL Players Cup ===
Pos	Grp	Team	Pld	W	PW	PL	L	GF	GA	GD	Pts	Qualification
3	NR	Everton	5	4	0	0	1	13	3	+10	12	Advance to Knockout Phase
4	NR	Liverpool	5	4	0	0	1	19	12	+7	12	Advance to Knockout Phase
5	SR	London City Lionesses	5	4	0	0	1	9	4	+5	12	Advance to Knockout Phase
6	SR	Tottenham Hotspur	5	3	0	2	0	15	2	+13	11	Advance to Knockout Phase
7	SR	West Ham United	5	3	1	0	1	9	4	+5	11	Advance to Knockout Phase

Updated to match(es) played on 18 November 2026. Source: WSL Football
Rules for classification: 1) Points; 2) Goal difference; 3) Number of goals scored; 4) Number of wins; 5) Head-to-head record

Following the competition's restructuring, London City were drawn in the Southern Region for the league stage of the competition.

Win Draw Loss Fixtures

23 September 2026	Leicester City	0–2	London City Lionesses	Nottingham
19:30 BST		Report	Parris 80'; Diani 88'	Stadium: Meadow Lane; Attendance: 473; Referee: Ben Speedie

30 September 2026	Ipswich Town	0–1	London City Lionesses	Myland
19:30 BST		Report	Van de Donk 90'	Stadium: JobServe Community Stadium; Attendance: 1,283; Referee: Ryan Atkin

21 October 2026	West Ham United	1–2	London City Lionesses	Dagenham
19:00 BST	Asseyi 38'	Report	Anyomi 29'; Goodwin 45+3'; Pérez (yellow card) 90+5'	Stadium: Chigwell Construction Stadium; Referee: Kirsty Dowle

28 October 2026	London City Lionesses	4–2	Crystal Palace F.C. Women	Bromley
19:00 GMT	Goodwin 44', 59', 74'; Godfrey 84'	Report	Blanchard 82'; O'Brien 90+2'	Stadium: Copperjax Community Stadium; Attendance: 1,284; Referee: Abigail Byrne

18 November 2026	London City Lionesses	v	Brighton & Hove Albion	Bromley
19:00 GMT		Report		Stadium: Copperjax Community Stadium

16 December 2026	London City Lionesses	v	Bristol City	Bromley
19:00 GMT		Report		Stadium: Copperjax Community Stadium

== Squad statistics ==
=== Appearances and goals ===
Starting appearances are listed first, followed by substitute appearances after the + symbol where applicable.

As of match played 21 November 2026

No.	Pos	Nat	Player	Total		WSL		FA Cup		League Cup	
No.	Pos	Nat	Player	Apps	Goals	Apps	Goals	Apps	Goals	Apps	Goals
Goalkeepers
27	GK	(England) ENG	Mary Earps	7	0	3	0	0	0	4	0
28	GK	(England) ENG	Sophie Hillyerd	0	0	0	0	0	0	0	0
35	GK	(England) ENG	Sophia Poor	0	0	0	0	0	0	0	0
77	GK	(Spain) ESP	Elene Lete								
Defenders
2	DF	(Spain) ESP	Jana Fernández	12	2	9	2	0	0	1+2	0
3	DF	(England) ENG	Poppy Pattinson	11	1	4+4	1	0	0	2+1	0
4	DF	(Netherlands) NED	Isa Kardinaal	9	0	6	0	0	0	1+2	0
13	DF	(Italy) ITA	Elena Linari	9	0	1+2	0	0	0	5+1	0
33	DF	(Australia) AUS	Alanna Kennedy	7	1	2+1	1	0	0	4	0
44	DF	(Spain) ESP	Mapi León	11	0	10	0	0	0	1	0
97	DF	(Denmark) DEN	Janni Thomsen	15	0	2+8	0	0	0	5	0
99	DF	(United States) USA	Corinne Henson	10	0	7+1	0	0	0	2	0
Midfielders
6	MF	(Spain) ESP	María Pérez	17	0	5+4	0	0	0	6+2	0
10	MF	(Netherlands) NED	Daniëlle van de Donk	13	6	11	5	0	0	0+2	1
11	MF	(Spain) ESP	Alexia Putellas	14	5	10+1	5	0	0	3	0
16	MF	(Spain) ESP	Daniela Arques	14	0	9+2	0	0	0	2+1	0
88	MF	(France) FRA	Grace Geyoro	18	1	11	1	0	0	3+4	0
Forwards
7	FW	(Spain) ESP	Lucía Corrales	13	1	7+1	1	0	0	2+3	0
14	FW	(England) ENG	Freya Godfrey	18	3	5+6	2	0	0	3+4	1
17	FW	(England) ENG	Nikita Parris	9	2	0+2	0	0	0	4+3	2
19	FW	(Germany) GER	Nicole Anyomi	13	2	8+1	1	0	0	3+1	1
20	FW	(France) FRA	Delphine Cascarino	12	3	4+5	3	0	0	2+1	0
21	FW	(France) FRA	Kadidiatou Diani	14	5	7+3	4	0	0	1+3	1
23	FW	(England) ENG	Isobel Goodwin	11	8	4+2	4	0	0	4+1	4
76	FW	(Sweden) SWE	Rosa Kafaji	8	0	2+1	0	0	0	4+1	0
Players out on loan, left during the season, on long term injury list etc.
5	DF	(England) ENG	Teyah Goldie	0	0	0	0	0	0	0	0
9	FW	(Sweden) SWE	Kosovare Asllani	0	0	0	0	0	0	0	0
12	FW	(Spain) ESP	Paula Partido	0	0	0	0	0	0	0	0
15	FW	(Finland) FIN	Sanni Franssi	0	0	0	0	0	0	0	0
30	MF	(Denmark) DEN	Malou Marcetto	0	0	0	0	0	0	0	0
32	GK	(England) ENG	Emily Orman	0	0	0	0	0	0	0	0

== Transfers and loans ==
=== Transfers in ===
Date	Position	Nationality	Player	From club	Ref.
19 June 2026	GK	(England)	Mary Earps	(France) Paris Saint-Germain	
2 July 2026	FW	(Germany)	Nicole Anyomi	(Germany) Eintracht Frankfurt	
3 July 2026	DF	(Denmark)	Janni Thomsen	(United States) Utah Royals	
8 July 2026	MF	(Spain)	Alexia Putellas	(Spain) Barcelona	
13 July 2026	DF	(Spain)	Mapi León	(Spain) Barcelona	
15 July 2026	FW	(France)	Kadidiatou Diani	(France) OL Lyonnes	
16 July 2026	FW	(Sweden)	Rosa Kafaji	(England) Arsenal	
29 July 2026	FW	(Spain)	Daniela Arques	(Portugal) Sporting CP	

=== Contract extensions ===
Date	Position	Nationality	Player	At London City Lionesses since	Ref.
8 June 2026	GK	(Spain)	Elene Lete	2025	
10 June 2026	MF	(Spain)	María Pérez	2024	
26 June 2026	FW	(England)	Freya Godfrey	2025	
27 June 2026	DF	(England)	Poppy Pattinson	2025	
1 July 2026	GK	(England)	Sophie Hillyerd	2023	

=== Transfers out ===
Date	Position	Nationality	Player	To club	Ref.
15 May 2026	MF	(Sweden)	Julia Roddar	(Italy) Lazio	
15 May 2026	DF	(England)	Maddi Wilde	(England) Burnley	
15 May 2026	MF	(England)	Gesa Marashi		
22 May 2026	MF	(England)	Katie Zelem	(England) West Ham United	
3 July 2026	DF	(England)	Cerys Brown	(England) Nottingham Forest	
10 July 2026	FW	(Finland)	Lotta Lindström	(England) Bristol City	
30 August 2026	DF	(Nigeria)	Rofiat Imuran	(England) Aston Villa	
4 September 2026	DF	(Japan)	Saki Kumagai	(England) West Ham United	

=== Loans out ===
Date	Position	Nationality	Player	To club	Ref.
10 July 2026	DF	(England)	Teyah Goldie	(England) Crystal Palace	
18 July 2026	FW	(Spain)	Paula Partido	(England) Charlton Athletic	
21 July 2026	GK	(England)	Emily Orman	(England) Wolverhampton	
24 July 2026	FW	(Finland)	Sanni Franssi	(England) Sunderland	
