= 2025–26 London City Lionesses season =

English women's football club season

London City Lionesses
2025–26 season
- Owner: Michele Kang
- Manager: Jocelyn Prêcheur (until 21 December); Eder Maestre (from 2 January 2026)
- Stadium: Hayes Lane, Bromley
- Women's Super League: 6th
- FA Cup: Fifth round
- League Cup: Group stage
- Top goalscorer: League: Isobel Goodwin; Freya Godfrey (5 each); All: Isobel Goodwin; Freya Godfrey; Nikita Parris (5 each)
- Highest home attendance: 5,414 (vs Arsenal, WSL, 15 March 2026)
- Lowest home attendance: 990 (vs Leicester City, League Cup, 19 October 2025)
- Average home league attendance: 3,294
- Biggest win: 4–2 (vs Tottenham Hotspur (H), WSL, 9 November 2025); 3–1 (vs Aston Villa (A), WSL, 16 November 2025); 2–0 (vs Ipswich Town (A), League Cup, 23 November 2025)
- Biggest defeat: 1–5 (vs Manchester United (H), WSL, 14 September 2025)
- All statistics correct as of 21 March 2026.

The 2025–26 season was London City Lionesses' 7th season in existence with 2025–26 their inaugural season in the Women's Super League, the highest level of the football pyramid after gaining promotion for the first time as 2024–25 Women's Championship winners.

On 21 December 2025, Jocelyn Prêcheur was sacked by the club. Eder Maestre was appointed as manager on 2 January 2026.

== Squad ==
As of 18 March 2026

Note: Flags indicate national team as defined under FIFA eligibility rules; some limited exceptions apply. Players may hold more than one non-FIFA nationality.

No.	Pos.	Nation	Player
2	DF	ESP	Jana Fernández
3	DF	ENG	Poppy Pattinson
4	DF	NED	Isa Kardinaal
5	DF	ENG	Teyah Goldie
6	MF	ESP	María Pérez
7	FW	ESP	Lucía Corrales
8	MF	JPN	Saki Kumagai
9	FW	SWE	Kosovare Asllani (captain)
10	MF	NED	Daniëlle van de Donk
12	FW	ESP	Paula Partido
13	DF	ITA	Elena Linari
14	FW	ENG	Freya Godfrey
15	FW	FIN	Sanni Franssi

No.	Pos.	Nation	Player
16	MF	SWE	Julia Roddar
17	FW	ENG	Nikita Parris
20	FW	FRA	Delphine Cascarino
23	FW	ENG	Isobel Goodwin
25	DF	NGR	Rofiat Imuran
26	DF	FRA	Wassa Sangaré (on loan from Lyon)
27	DF	USA	Corinne Henson
30	MF	DEN	Malou Marcetto
32	GK	ENG	Emily Orman
33	DF	AUS	Alanna Kennedy
35	GK	ENG	Sophia Poor
77	GK	ESP	Elene Lete
88	MF	FRA	Grace Geyoro

== Pre-season ==
1 August 2025	Twente (Netherlands)	1–2	London City Lionesses	Arnhem, Netherlands
18:00	Tuin 46'		Goodwin; Roddar	Stadium: National Sports Centre Papendal

16 August 2025	Bristol City	v	London City Lionesses	Bristol
17:00				Stadium: Robins High Performance Centre

21 August 2025	Lyon (France)	3–1	London City Lionesses	Décines-Charpieu, France
18:00	Joseph 32'; Benyahia 67' (pen.); Yohannes 89'		Godfrey 76'	Stadium: Groupama OL Training Center

29 August 2025	Leicester City	1–3	London City Lionesses	Leicester
15:00	Cain		Goal	Stadium: Belvoir Drive Training Ground

== Competitions ==
=== Women's Super League ===
==== League table ====
Pos	Team	Pld	W	D	L	GF	GA	GD	Pts
4	Manchester United	22	11	7	4	38	22	+16	40
5	Tottenham Hotspur	22	11	3	8	35	38	−3	36
6	London City Lionesses	22	8	3	11	28	35	−7	27
7	Brighton & Hove Albion	22	7	5	10	27	28	−1	26
8	Everton	22	7	2	13	25	37	−12	23

Source: WSL League Table
Rules for classification: 1) Points; 2) Goal difference; 3) Number of goals scored.

==== Results summary ====
Overall								Home						Away					
Pld	W	D	L	GF	GA	GD	Pts	W	D	L	GF	GA	GD	W	D	L	GF	GA	GD
20	7	3	10	25	32	−7	24	4	2	5	14	15	−1	3	1	5	11	17	−6

Last updated: 26 April 2026.
Source: WSL Summary

==== Results by matchday ====
Matchday	1	2	3	4	5	6	7	8	9	10	11	12	13	14	15	16	17	18	19	20	21	22
Ground	A	H	A	A	H	H	A	H	A	H	A	A	H	A	H	A	H	H	A	H	A	H
Result	L	L	W	L	W	W	L	W	W	L	L	D	L	W	L	L	L	D	D	W	L	W
Position	11	12	8	9	7	6	6	6	6	6	6	7	8	6	6	6	7	7	7	7	7	6

Updated to match(es) played on 16 May 2026. Source: WSL Results
A = Away; H = Home; W = Win; D = Draw; L = Loss; P = Postponed

==== Matches ====
6 September 2025 1	Arsenal	4–1	London City Lionesses	Holloway
13:30 BST	Smith 29'; Kelly 45+2', (yellow card) 64'; Blackstenius 83'; Maanum 84'	Report	Asllani 17' (pen.); Parris (yellow card) 20'; Zelem (yellow card) 28'; Kumagai (yellow card) 58'	Stadium: Emirates Stadium; Attendance: 38,142; Referee: Stacey Fullicks

14 September 2025 2	London City Lionesses	1–5	Manchester United	Bromley
12:00 BST	Parris 76'	Report	Le Tissier 3' (pen.); Riviere (yellow card) 28', (goal) 33'; Malard 47', 50'; Park 87'	Stadium: Hayes Lane; Attendance: 2,800; Referee: Emily Heaslip

19 September 2025 3	Everton	1–2	London City Lionesses	Walton
19:30 BST	Pacheco (yellow card) 7'; Mace (yellow card) 34'; Wheeler (yellow card) 37'; Vignola (yellow card) 56'; Momiki 71' (pen.)	Report	Goodwin 13', 58'; Sangaré (yellow card) 81'; Asllani (yellow card) 90+3'	Stadium: Goodison Park; Attendance: 4,313; Referee: Ryan Atkins

28 September 2025 4	Manchester City	4–1	London City Lionesses	Manchester
12:00 BST	Miedema 11'; Blindkilde Brown 14'; Shaw 69' (pen.), 89' (pen.); Fujino (yellow card) 90+4'	Report	Parris 19'	Stadium: Academy Stadium; Attendance: 3,341; Referee: Phoebe Cross

5 October 2025 5	London City Lionesses	1–0	Liverpool	Bromley
11:55 BST	Geyoro (yellow card) 18'; Parris (yellow card) 24'; Linari 89' (pen.)	Report	Borggräfe (yellow card) 86'; Höbinger (yellow card) 90+7'	Stadium: Hayes Lane; Attendance: 2,471; Referee: Emily Heaslip

12 October 2025 6	London City Lionesses	1–0	West Ham United	Bromley
12:00 BST	Asllani 68'	Report	Gorry (yellow card) 26'	Stadium: Hayes Lane; Attendance: 1,872; Referee: Abigail Byrne

1 November 2025 7	Chelsea	2–0	London City Lionesses	Fulham
12:00 GMT	Carpenter 6'; Cuthbert (yellow card) 38'; Kerr 90+4'	Report	Sangaré (yellow card) 62'	Stadium: Stamford Bridge; Attendance: 10,441; Referee: Kirsty Dowle

9 November 2025 8	London City Lionesses	4–2	Tottenham Hotspur	Bromley
11:55 GMT	Godfrey 8', 84', (yellow card) 66'; Parris (yellow card) 25', (goal) 50'; Geyoro (yellow card) 33'; Asllani (yellow card) 68'; Nildén 81' (o.g.)	Report	Nildén (yellow card) 34'; Tandberg 38'; Neville (yellow card) 48'; Summanen 69'; Thomas (yellow card) 80'	Stadium: Hayes Lane; Attendance: 3,302; Referee: Stacey Pearson

16 November 2025 9	Aston Villa	1–3	London City Lionesses	Aston
12:00 GMT	Hanson 33'; Taylor (yellow card) 45+5'	Report	Kumagai 12', 55'; Goodwin 51'; Asllani (yellow card) 68'	Stadium: Villa Park; Attendance: 2,903; Referee: Samuel Allison

7 December 2025 10	London City Lionesses	0–1	Brighton & Hove Albion	Bromley
12:00 GMT	Parris (yellow card) 29'; Franssi (yellow card) 83'; Kennedy (yellow card) 90+3'	Report	Seike 6'; Vanegas (yellow card) 42'; Noordam (yellow card) 70'	Stadium: Hayes Lane; Attendance: 3,302; Referee: Grace Lowe

14 December 2025 11	Leicester City	1–0	London City Lionesses	Leicester
11:55 GMT	Swaby (yellow card) 24'; O'Brien 59'; Ayane (yellow card) 90+8'	Report		Stadium: King Power Stadium; Attendance: 2,251; Referee: Melissa Burgin

11 January 2026 12	Liverpool	0–0	London City Lionesses	St Helens
14:30 GMT	Parry (yellow card) 90+2'	Report	Sangaré (yellow card) 38'; Linari (yellow card) 67'; Asllani (yellow card) 74'; Pérez (yellow card) 90+1'	Stadium: BrewDog Stadium; Attendance: 2,419; Referee: Phoebe Cross

25 January 2026 13	London City Lionesses	1–2	Manchester City	Bromley
11:55 GMT	Pattinson (yellow card) 64'; Godfrey 68'	Report	Knaak (yellow card) 6'; Kerolin 11'; Shaw 86'	Stadium: Hayes Lane; Attendance: 3,418; Referee: Lisa Benn

1 February 2026 14	Brighton & Hove Albion	1–2	London City Lionesses	Crawley
11:55 GMT	Seike 23'; McLauchlan (yellow card) 77'; Čanković (yellow card) 90+3'	Report	Minami 36' (o.g.); Godfrey 45+1'	Stadium: Broadfield Stadium; Attendance: 1,990; Referee: Megan Wilson

8 February 2026 15	London City Lionesses	0–1	Everton	Bromley
12:00 GMT	Geyoro (yellow card) 52'; Sangaré (yellow card) 84'; Fernández (yellow card) 84'	Report	Gabarro 65'; Fernández (yellow card) 72'	Stadium: Hayes Lane; Attendance: 2,250; Referee: Emily Heaslip

15 February 2026 16	Manchester United	2–1	London City Lionesses	Leigh
14:00 GMT	Park 30'; Riviere (yellow card) 39'; Zigiotti Olme (yellow card) 75'; Turner 79'	Report	Parris 5'; Pattinson (yellow card) 65'; Fernández (yellow card) 71'; Geyoro (yellow card) 77'	Stadium: Leigh Sports Village; Attendance: 3,763; Referee: Ross Martin

15 March 2026 17	London City Lionesses	0–2	Arsenal	Bromley
11:55 GMT	Godfrey (yellow card) 45+2'; Corrales (yellow card) 57'; Franssi (yellow card) 60'	Report	Smith 15' (yellow card) 61'; Blackstenius 76'; Kelly (yellow card) 86'; Fox (yellow card) 87'; Pelova (yellow card) 90+1'	Stadium: Hayes Lane; Attendance: 5,414; Referee: Kirsty Dowle

21 March 2026 18	London City Lionesses	1–1	Chelsea	New Cross
12:00 GMT	Marcetto (yellow card) 29'; Parris (yellow card) 49'; Goodwin 82'	Report	Rytting Kaneryd 22'; Walsh (yellow card) 84'; Thompson (yellow card) 87'	Stadium: The Den; Attendance: 4,820; Referee: Emily Heaslip

29 March 2026 19	West Ham United	1–1	London City Lionesses	Dagenham
12:00 BST	Siren 64'	Report	Fernández 20'; Sangaré (yellow card) 63'	Stadium: Victoria Road; Attendance: 1,318; Referee: Stacey Pearson

26 April 2026 20	London City Lionesses	5–1	Leicester City	Bromley
12:00 BST	Corrales 32'; Goodwin 44'; Marcetto 59'; Geyoro 87'; Godfrey 89'	Report	O'Brien 30'	Stadium: Hayes Lane; Attendance: 2,308; Referee: Sophie Dennington

3 May 2026 21	Tottenham Hotspur	2–1	London City Lionesses	Leyton
12:00	Gaupset 13'; Holdt 28'	Report	Kennedy (yellow card) 49' (goal) 90'	Stadium: Brisbane Road; Attendance: 1,809; Referee: Megan Wilson

16 May 2026 22	London City Lionesses	2–1	Aston Villa	Bromley
13:00	Van de Donk 73'; Godfrey 90+3'	Report	Wilms 45+2', (yellow card) 90+1'; Taylor (yellow card) 61'	Stadium: Hayes Lane; Attendance: 2,982; Referee: William Davis

==== 2025–26 WSL ====
Player v Match >	1	2	3	4	5	6	7	8	9	10	11	12	13	14	15	16	17	18	19	20	21	22
Ground	A	H	A	A	H	H	A	H	A	H	A	A	H	A	H	A	H	H	A	H	A	H
Result	L	L	W	L	W	W	L	W	W	L	L	D	L	W	L	L	L	D	D	W	L	W
Position	11	12	8	9	7	6	6	6	6	6	6	7	8	6	6	6	7	7	7	7	7	6
Kosovare Asllani	1(1)	1	1	1	1	1(1)	1	1	1	1	1	1	1	1	1	+63	+65	1	+67	-	-	-
Cerys Brown	-	B	B	1	B	B	B	B	-	-	B	B	B	-	-	-	-	-	-	-	-	-
Delphine Cascarino	-	-	-	-	-	-	-	-	-	-	-	-	-	-	-	-	+78	+56	-	1	1	1
Lucía Corrales	+93	1	1	1	1	+56	-	-	-	-	+62	1	1	1	1	-	1	+46	1	1(1)	1	+46
Daniëlle van de Donk	-	-	-	-	-	-	-	-	-	-	-	-	+70	-	+60	1	1	1	-	-	-	+66(1)
Jana Fernández	1	1	1	+75	1	1	1	1	1	1	1	1	1	1	1	1	1	1	1(1)	1	1	1
Sanni Franssi	+65	+77	+90	+87	1	+56	+66	+72	+67	+76	B	+77	+85	+82	B	1	1	B	+72	+90	+61	B
Grace Geyoro	-	+77	+46	1	1	1	1	1	1	1	1	1	+70	+46	1	1	1	1	-	1(1)	1	1
Freya Godfrey	-	-	-	-	+66	1	1	1(2)	1	1	1	1	1(1)	1(1)	1	1	1	1	1	+65(1)	+61	1(1)
Isobel Goodwin	1	1	1(2)	1	1	1	1	1	1(1)	1	1	+63	1	1	1	+63	+65	+56(1)	1	1(1)	1	1
Teyah Goldie	+83	-	-	-	-	-	-	B	+94	+87	-	-	B	+94	B	+87	1	B	B	B	B	B
Corinne Henson	B	-	-	-	-	-	-	-	-	-	-	-	-	-	-	-	-	-	-	-	-	-
Sophie Hillyerd GK	-	-	-	-	B	-	-	B	-	B	B	-	-	-	-	-	-	-	-	-	-	-
Rofiat Imuran	1	1	1	B	B	1	1	1	1	1	1	-	-	B	B	B	-	-	B	+90	-	-
Sofia Jakobsson	+65	B	B	-	-	-	-	-	-	B	-	-	-	-	-	-	-	-	-	-	-	-
Isa Kardinaal	-	-	-	-	-	-	-	-	-	B	+62	B	-	-	-	-	-	-	B	1	1	1
Alanna Kennedy	1	1	+84	B	+91	+66	B	+86	+78	+87	-	B	1	+82	1	1	-	-	+67	1	+31(1)	1
Saki Kumagai	1	1	1	1	1	1	1	1	1(2)	1	1	1	B	+66	1	1	-	-	1	1	1	1
Elene Lete GK	1	1	1	1	1	1	1	1	1	1	1	1	1	1	1	1	1	1	1	1	1	1
Elena Linari	1	B	1	1	1(1)	1	1	1	1	1	1	1	B	1	B	1	B	1	1	B	B	B
Lotta Lindström	B	+56	+46	+64	+82	B	+82	B	B	-	B	-	-	-	-	-	-	-	-	-	-	-
Gesa Marashi	-	-	-	B	-	-	-	-	-	-	-	-	-	B	-	-	-	-	-	-	-	-
Malou Marcetto	-	-	-	-	-	-	-	-	-	-	-	-	-	-	-	+80	1	1	1	1(1)	1	+46
Emily Orman GK	B	B	B	B	-	-	-	-	-	-	-	B	B	B	-	B	B	B	B	B	B	B
Nikita Parris	1	1(1)	1	1(1)	1	1	1	1(1)	1	1	1	1	+78	B	+74	1(1)	B	1	-	1	+80	+66
Paula Partido	-	-	-	-	-	-	-	-	-	-	-	-	-	-	-	-	B	B	B	B	B	-
Poppy Pattinson	-	-	-	-	-	-	+78	+92	B	-	-	+88	1	1	1	1	1	1	1	+71	1	1
María Pérez	1	+56	1	1	B	B	B	-	B	B	B	+63	1	1	+60	B	B	B	+97	+71	+80	1
Sophia Poor GK	-	-	-	-	-	B	B	-	B	-	-	-	-	-	B	B	-	-	-	-	-	-
Julia Roddar	+46	1	+76	+64	+82	+80	+77	+72	+66	+76	+81	1	1	1	+74	+80	+78	+56	1	-	-	+95
Wassa Sangaré	B	+67	1	1	1	1	1	1	1	1	1	1	1	1	1	-	1	1	1	-	1	-
Katie Zelem	1	1	B	+87	B	+80	B	+93	+94	+61	+81	B	-	-	-	-	-	-	-	-	-	-

Updated to match(es) played on 16 May 2026. Source: WSL Results
A = Away; H = Home; B = Bench; W = Win; D = Draw; L = Loss; P = Postponed

Match 8 - Nildén 81' (o.g.) Match 14 - Minami 36' (o.g.)

=== FA Cup ===
As a member of the top tier, London City Lionesses entered the FA Cup in the fourth round.

17 January 2026 Fourth round	Sunderland	0–1	London City Lionesses	Hetton-le-Hole
12:15 GMT	Fenton (yellow card) 73'; Atkinson (yellow card) 79'	Report	Pattinson (yellow card) 46'; Sangaré 50' (yellow card) 53'; Pérez (yellow card) 64'	Stadium: Eppleton CW; Attendance: 389; Referee: Adewunmi Soneye

22 February 2026 Fifth round	London City Lionesses	2–2 (8–9 p)	Tottenham Hotspur	Bromley
14:00 GMT	Fernández (yellow card) 35' (goal) 59'; van de Donk 58'	Report	Vinberg 7'; England 90+6' (pen.); Tandberg (yellow card) 105'	Stadium: Hayes Lane; Attendance: 1,400; Referee: Ryan Atkin
	Penalties
	Goodwin (penalty scored); Corrales (penalty scored); Pattinson (penalty scored); Roddar (penalty scored); Partido (penalty scored); Kumagai (penalty scored); Marcetto (penalty scored); Fernández (penalty scored); Sangaré (penalty missed)		England (penalty scored); Tandberg (penalty scored); A. Nildén (penalty scored); Gaupset (penalty scored); Koga (penalty scored); Kop (penalty scored); Ahtinen (penalty scored); Gunning-Williams (penalty scored); Wijk (penalty scored)

=== League Cup ===
Pos	Team	Pld	W	PW	PL	L	GF	GA	GD	Pts	Qualification
1	Crystal Palace	3	2	0	0	1	7	4	+3	6	Advanced to knockout stage
2	Leicester City	3	2	0	0	1	6	4	+2	6	
3	London City Lionesses	3	2	0	0	1	4	2	+2	6	
4	Ipswich Town	3	0	0	0	3	3	10	−7	0	

Source: Women's League Cup
Rules for classification: 1) Points; 2) Goal difference; 3) Number of goals scored; 4) Number of wins; 5) Head-to-head record

==== Group stage ====
24 September 2025 Group stage	Crystal Palace	1–2	London City Lionesses	Sutton
19:30 BST	Weerden 11'	Report	Franssi 46'; Parris 78'	Stadium: Gander Green Lane; Attendance: 478; Referee: Stacey Pearson

19 October 2025 Group stage	London City Lionesses	0–1	Leicester City	Bromley
14:00 BST		Report	Rantala 2'	Stadium: Hayes Lane; Attendance: 990; Referee: Sophie Dennington

23 November 2025 Group stage	Ipswich Town	0–2	London City Lionesses	Myland
14:00 GMT		Report	Franssi 37', (yellow card) 45+1'; Lindström 75'	Stadium: Colchester Community Stadium; Attendance: 901; Referee: Megan Wilson

== Squad statistics ==
=== Appearances and goals ===
Starting appearances are listed first, followed by substitute appearances after the + symbol where applicable.

As of match played 15 May 2026

No.	Pos	Nat	Player	Total		WSL		FA Cup		League Cup	
No.	Pos	Nat	Player	Apps	Goals	Apps	Goals	Apps	Goals	Apps	Goals
Goalkeepers
32	GK	(England) ENG	Emily Orman	1	0	0	0	0	0	1	0
35	GK	(England) ENG	Sophia Poor	1	0	0	0	0	0	1	0
77	GK	(Spain) ESP	Elene Lete	25	0	22	0	2	0	1	0
Defenders
2	DF	(Spain) ESP	Jana Fernández	25	2	21+1	1	2	1	0+1	0
3	DF	(England) ENG	Poppy Pattinson	15	0	9+4	0	2	0	0	0
4	DF	(Netherlands) NED	Isa Kardinaal	4	0	3+1	0	0	0	0	0
5	DF	(England) ENG	Teyah Goldie	8	0	1+5	0	1	0	1	0
13	DF	(Italy) ITA	Elena Linari	16	1	15	1	0	0	1	0
25	DF	(Nigeria) NGR	Rofiat Imuran	13	0	9+1	0	0	0	3	0
26	DF	(France) FRA	Wassa Sangaré	22	1	17+1	0	2	1	2	0
27	DF	(United States) USA	Corrine Henson	0	0	0	0	0	0	0	0
33	DF	(Australia) AUS	Alanna Kennedy	20	1	7+9	1	1	0	3	0
Midfielders
6	MF	(Spain) ESP	María Pérez	16	0	6+6	0	1	0	3	0
8	MF	(Japan) JPN	Saki Kumagai	21	2	18+1	2	1+1	0	0	0
10	MF	(Netherlands) NED	Daniëlle van de Donk	8	2	3+3	1	0+2	1	0	0
16	MF	(Sweden) SWE	Julia Roddar	25	0	5+15	0	1+1	0	2+1	0
30	MF	(Denmark) DEN	Malou Marcetto	8	1	5+2	1	0+1	0	0	0
65	MF	(England) ENG	Sienna Loom	1	0	0	0	0	0	0+1	0
88	MF	(France) FRA	Grace Geyoro	24	1	16+4	1	2	0	2	0
Forwards
7	FW	(Spain) ESP	Lucía Corrales	21	1	12+5	1	0+2	0	1+1	0
9	FW	(Sweden) SWE	Kosovare Asllani	21	2	16+3	2	1+1	0	0	0
12	FW	(Spain) ESP	Paula Partido	1	0	0	0	0+1	0	0	0
14	FW	(England) ENG	Freya Godfrey	22	6	15+3	6	2	0	1+1	0
15	FW	(Finland) FIN	Sanni Franssi	23	2	3+15	0	2	0	3	2
17	FW	(England) ENG	Nikita Parris	23	5	15+4	4	1	0	1+2	1
20	FW	(France) FRA	Delphine Cascarino	5	0	3+2	0	0	0	0	0
23	FW	(England) ENG	Isobel Goodwin	24	5	18+4	5	1+1	0	0	0
Players out on loan, left during the season etc.
11	FW	(Sweden) SWE	Sofia Jakobsson	3	0	0+1	0	0	0	1+1	0
18	MF	(England) ENG	Gesa Marashi	3	0	0	0	0	0	2+1	0
19	FW	(Finland) FIN	Lotta Lindström	8	1	0+5	0	0	0	3	1
21	MF	(England) ENG	Katie Zelem	11	0	2+6	0	0	0	3	0
22	DF	(England) ENG	Cerys Brown	4	0	1	0	0	0	3	0
24	DF	(England) ENG	Maddi Wilde	0	0	0	0	0	0	0	0
28	GK	(England) ENG	Sophie Hillyerd	0	0	0	0	0	0	0	0

== Transfers and loans ==
=== Transfers in ===
Date	Position	Nationality	Player	From club	Ref.
20 June 2025	MF	(Netherlands)	Daniëlle van de Donk	(France) Lyon	
4 July 2025	FW	(Finland)	Sanni Franssi	(Spain) Real Sociedad	
5 July 2025	DF	(Netherlands)	Isa Kardinaal	(Netherlands) Ajax	
7 July 2025	DF	(England)	Teyah Goldie	(England) Arsenal	
8 July 2025	DF	(England)	Poppy Pattinson	(England) Brighton & Hove Albion	
10 July 2025	GK	(Spain)	Elene Lete	(Spain) Real Sociedad	
19 July 2025	GK	(England)	Sophia Poor	(England) Aston Villa	
23 July 2025	MF	(England)	Freya Godfrey	(England) Arsenal	
26 July 2025	FW	(England)	Nikita Parris	(England) Brighton & Hove Albion	
1 August 2025	DF	(Italy)	Elena Linari	(Italy) AS Roma	
2 August 2025	MF	(Spain)	Paula Partido	(Spain) Real Madrid	
15 August 2025	DF	(Spain)	Jana Fernández	(Spain) Barcelona	
27 August 2025	MF	(England)	Katie Zelem	(United States) Angel City	
27 August 2025	DF	(Australia)	Alanna Kennedy	(United States) Angel City	
4 September 2025	MF	(Spain)	Lucía Corrales	(Spain) Barcelona	
5 September 2025	MF	(France)	Grace Geyoro	(France) Paris Saint-Germain	
19 January 2026	FW	(France)	Delphine Cascarino	(United States) San Diego Wave	
4 February 2026	MF	(Denmark)	Malou Marcetto	(Spain) Madrid CFF	

=== Loans in ===
Date	Position	Nationality	Player	From club	Ref.
29 August 2025	DF	(France)	Wassa Sangaré	(France) Lyon	

=== Transfers out ===
Date	Position	Nationality	Player	To club	Ref.
15 May 2025	FW	(Ghana)	Chantelle Boye-Hlorkah	(England) Nottingham Forest	
15 May 2025	DF	(England)	Georgia Brougham	(England) Nottingham Forest	
15 May 2025	DF	(Republic of Ireland)	Megan Campbell	Retired	
15 May 2025	MF	(England)	Lucy Fitzgerald	(England) Charlton Athletic	
15 May 2025	DF	(Scotland)	Emma Mukandi	Retired	
15 May 2025	MF	(Northern Ireland)	Connie Scofield	(England) Sheffield United	
30 June 2025	FW	(England)	Amelia Ajao	(England) AFC Wimbledon Women	
30 June 2025	FW	(England)	Danielle Carter	Retired	
30 June 2025	GK	(England)	Hermione Cull	(England) Plymouth Argyle	
30 June 2025	FW	(Serbia)	Miljana Ivanović	(Sweden) Malmö	
30 June 2025	MF	(Cameroon)	Charlène Meyong	(Saudi Arabia) Al-Ahli Saudi	
11 July 2025	MF	(China)	Shen Mengyu	(China) Shanghai Shengli	
22 July 2025	DF	(New Zealand)	Grace Neville	(England) Ipswich Town	
29 January 2026	FW	(Sweden)	Sofia Jakobsson	(Mexico) Toluca	

=== Loans out ===
Date	Position	Nationality	Player	To club	Ref.
8 August 2025	MF	(Spain)	Paula Partido	(Spain) Dux Logroño	
8 August 2025	GK	(England)	Sophia Poor	(England) Nottingham Forest	
7 January 2026	FW	(Finland)	Lotta Lindström	(England) Birmingham City	
20 January 2026	GK	(England)	Sophie Hillyerd	(England) Watford	
23 January 2026	MF	(England)	Katie Zelem	(England) West Ham United	
31 January 2026	DF	(England)	Cerys Brown	(England) Nottingham Forest	
7 February 2026	MF	(England)	Maddi Wilde	(Scotland) Celtic	
18 March 2026	MF	(England)	Gesa Marashi	(Norway) LSK Kvinner	
