= Rofiat Imuran =

Nigerian footballer (born 2004)

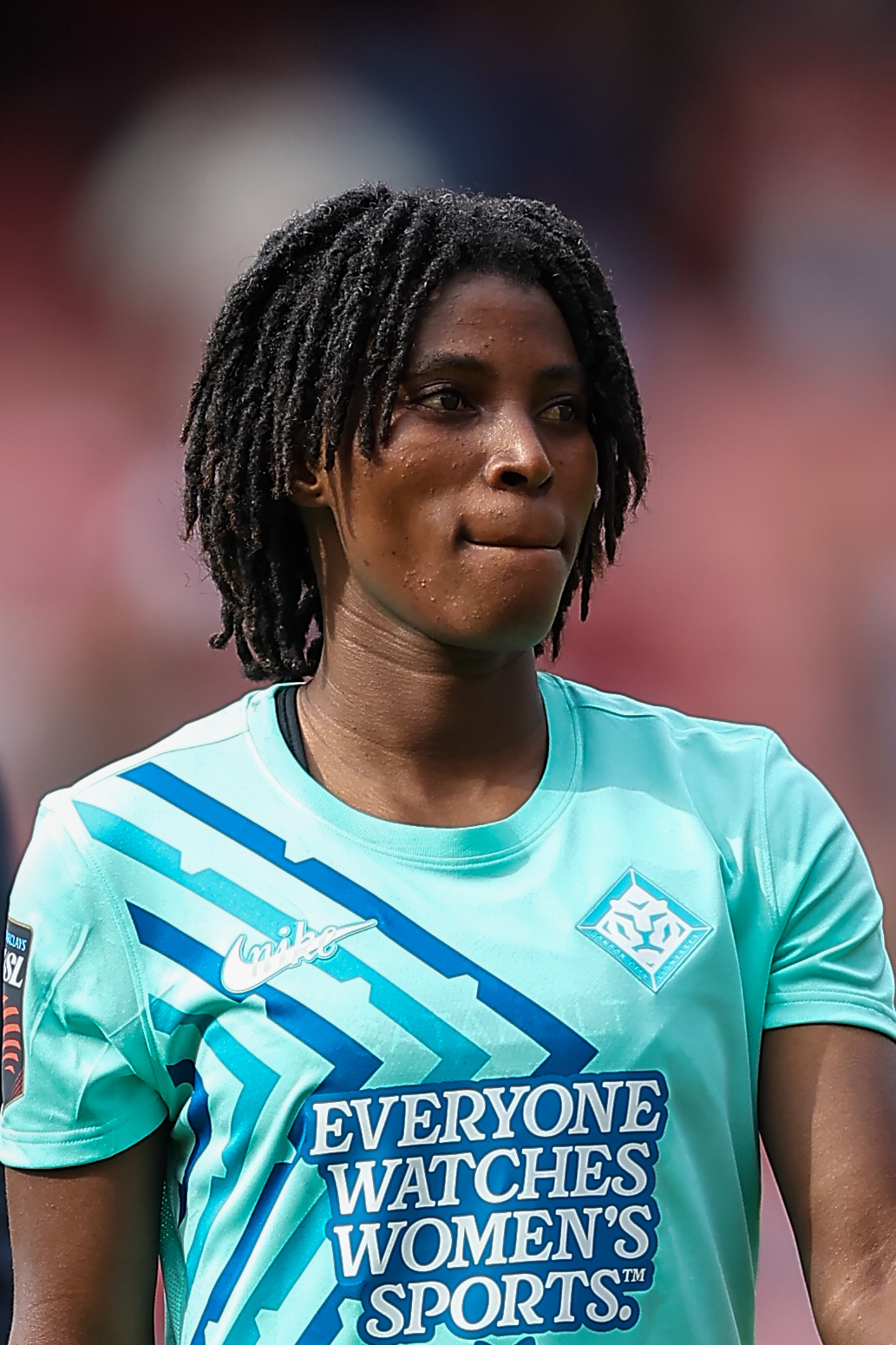
- Imuran in 2025

Personal information
- Full name: Rofiat Adenike Imuran
- Date of birth: 17 June 2004 (age 22)
- Place of birth: Ibadan, Nigeria
- Height: 1.65 m (5 ft 5 in)
- Position: Defender

Team information
- Current team: Aston Villa
- Number: 22

Senior career*
Years	Team	Apps	(Gls)
2022–2024	Stade de Reims	30	(8)
2024–2026	London City Lionesses	24	(0)
2026–	Aston Villa	3	(0)

International career^{‡}
2022–2024	Nigeria U20	8	(0)
2022–	Nigeria	10	(0)
- * Club domestic league appearances and goals as of 8 November 2026 ‡ National team caps and goals as of 18 August 2026

Rofiat Adenike Imuran (Yoruba: [ɾoːfiát imùɾán]; born 17 June 2004) is a Nigerian footballer who plays as a defender for Women's Super League club Aston Villa and for the Nigeria women's national team.

== Club career ==
=== State de Reims ===
On 13 October 2022, Imuran signed for Stade de Reims on a two-year contract. She made 30 league appearances and scored 8 goals for the club.

=== London City Lionesses ===
In October 2024, Imuran joined Women's Super League 2 team London City Lionesses on a three-year contract. Following a 2–2 victory over Birmingham City at the end of the 2024–25 season, the club became the first independent women’s team to gain a promotion to the Women's Super League (WSL).

=== Aston Villa ===
On 30 August 2026, Imuran signed for WSL side Aston Villa. She made her debut on 18 October 2026, in a 2–1 home victory over Liverpool.

== International career ==
Imuran represented Nigeria at the 2022 FIFA U-20 Women's World Cup.

On 16 June 2023, she was included in the 23-player Nigerian squad for the 2023 FIFA Women's World Cup.

== Career statistics ==
=== Club ===
As of match played 11 November 2026

Appearances and goals by club, season and competition
Club	Season	League			National Cup		League Cup		Other		Total	
Club	Season	Division	Apps	Goals	Apps	Goals	Apps	Goals	Apps	Goals	Apps	Goals
Stade de Reims	2022–23	Division 1 Féminine	6	2	0	0	–		–		6	2
Stade de Reims	2023–24	Division 1 Féminine	24	6	1	0	–		–		25	6
Stade de Reims	Total		30	8	1	0	0	0	0	0	31	8
London City Lionesses	2024–25	Women's Championship	14	0	2	0	2	0	–		18	0
London City Lionesses	2025–26	Women's Super League	10	0	0	0	3	0	–		13	0
London City Lionesses			24	0	2	0	5	0	0	0	31	0
Aston Villa	2026–27	Women's Super League	3	0	0	0	3	0	–		6	0
Career total			57	8	3	0	8	0	0	0	68	8

=== International ===
As of match played 1 August 2026

Appearances and goals by national team and year
National team	Year	Apps	Goals
Nigeria	2022	2	0
Nigeria	2023	4	0
Nigeria	2024	1	0
Nigeria	2025	0	0
Nigeria	2026	3	0
Total		10	0
