= Freya Godfrey =

English footballer (born 2005)

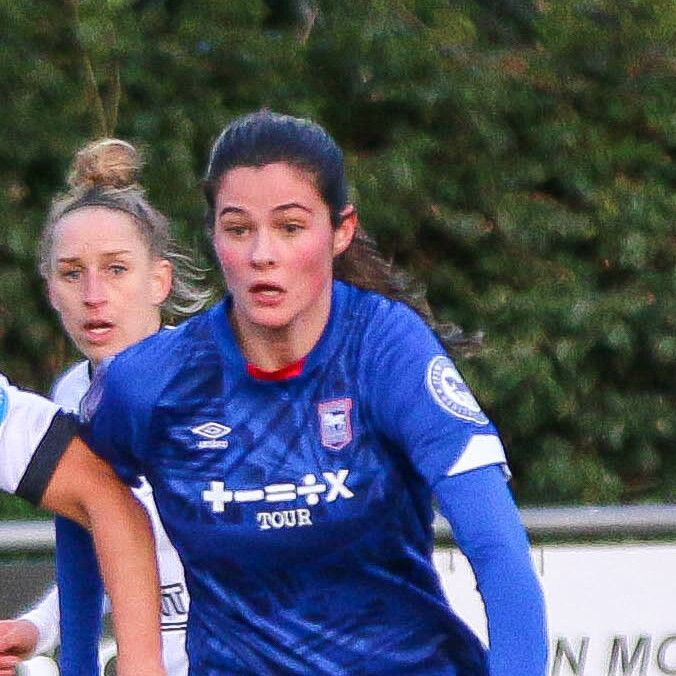
- Godfrey with Ipswich Town in 2023.

Personal information
- Date of birth: 7 May 2005 (age 21)
- Place of birth: Essex, England
- Positions: Forward; attacking midfielder

Team information
- Current team: London City Lionesses
- Number: 14

Youth career
- 2017–2023: Arsenal

Senior career*
Years	Team	Apps	(Gls)
2023–2025	Arsenal	2	(0)
2022–2023	→ Ipswich Town (dual reg)	13	(8)
2023–2024	→ Charlton Athletic (loan)	16	(0)
2025	→ London City Lionesses (loan)	8	(0)
2025–	London City Lionesses	23	(6)

International career^{‡}
2021	England U16		
2022	England U17	3	(0)
2022–2024	England U19	23	(12)
2024–	England U23	6	(1)
2026–	England	1	(0)
- * Club domestic league appearances and goals as of 12:18, 14 October 2026 (UTC) ‡ National team caps and goals as of 13 October 2026

Freya Godfrey (born 7 May 2005) is an English professional footballer who plays as a forward for Women's Super League club London City Lionesses and the England national team.

Godfrey started her career at Arsenal, from whom she has previously been on loan to then Ipswich Town and Charlton Athletic. She has represented England from under-14 youth level and captained the England under-19 national team.

== Early life ==
Born in Essex, Godfrey joined the Essex FA's Regional Talent Club at young age before becoming part of Arsenal's academy setup at the age of 12. She impressed at youth level, scoring 13 times in 18 appearances in the WSL Academy League.

== Club career ==
=== Arsenal ===
Godfrey played for Ipswich Town in the FA Women's National League Southern Premier Division in the 2022–23 season, while remaining with the Gunners under dual-registration.

As a central striker, she excelled with Ipswich, scoring 8 goals in all competitions, as well as the winner on the last day of the season against Oxford United on the 7 May 2023.

On 11 May 2023, Godfrey made her Arsenal and WSL debut as an 89th-minute substitute, appearing in Arsenal's 4–0 win over Brighton & Hove Albion.

In June 2023, Godfrey signed her first professional contract with Arsenal before joining Charlton Athletic on loan in July.

In December 2023, after 10 appearances with Charlton, she was profiled as one of the next-generation stars of the Women's Championship by Impetus Football.

=== London City Lionesses ===
In August 2024, BBC journalist Emma Sanders wrote that Bristol City were interested in Godfrey joining on loan, but she remained at Arsenal for the first half of the 2024–25 season before going out on loan to London City Lionesses in January 2025 for the second half of the season.

On 23 July 2025, it was announced that Godfrey was making the move to London City Lionesses a permanent one, following former Arsenal teammate Teyah Goldie in making the move to South London in the 2025 summer transfer window.

On 9 November 2025, Godfrey opened her scoring account for London City Lionesses with a brace in a 4–2 victory over Tottenham Hotspur. On 25 June 2026, she extended her contract with the club until 2029. On 4 September 2026, she started her season coming on as a substitute for new teammate Rosa Kafaji in the second half of the opening match of the season, which ended in a 2–1 home win against Manchester United.

== International career ==
=== Youth ===
Godfrey has represented England from under-14 to under-19 level.

In October 2021, she was named in the England U17 squad as the number 11, playing in 2022 U-17 Championship qualification matches against Russia, Belgium and Poland.

In October 2022, with the under-19s for 2023 U-19 Championship qualification, Godfrey scored two goal against Slovenia in a 5–0 victory. In April 2023, she scored another two goals against Belarus in a 5–2 win, becoming the team's top goalscorer in qualification.

In December 2023, she captained the under-19 team, scoring in all three Algarve Cup matches. On April 9, 2024, Godfrey again captained the U19 team, this time for successful 2024 U19 Championship qualification, as well as scoring the opening two goals in the 4–1 victory over Italy.

In October 2024, Godfrey was called up to the England under-23 squad following the injury to Missy Goodwin. On October 29, as 67th-minute substitute, she made her debut for the under-23s against Portugal in a 1–0 win.

=== Senior ===
Godfrey was called up to the England senior side for the first time in November 2025, ahead of friendlies against China and Ghana. In February 2026, she was again called up, along with London City teammate Poppy Pattinson, for 2027 FIFA Women's World Cup qualification matches against Ukraine and Iceland the following month. Godfrey made her senior debut on 13 October 2026, coming on as a 60th minute substitute in a 5–0 World Cup qualification play-off win against Greece at King Power Stadium.

== Career statistics ==
=== Club ===
As of match played 4 October 2026

Appearances and goals by club, season and competition
Club	Season	League			FA Cup		League Cup		Europe		Other		Total	
Club	Season	Division	Apps	Goals	Apps	Goals	Apps	Goals	Apps	Goals	Apps	Goals	Apps	Goals
Arsenal	2022–23	WSL	2	0	0	0	0	0	0	0	—		2	0
Arsenal	2023–24	WSL	0	0	0	0	0	0	0	0	—		0	0
Arsenal	2024–25	WSL	0	0	3	0	0	0	1 (Note: Appearance in UEFA Women's Champions League)	0	—		4	0
Arsenal	Total		2	0	3	0	0	0	1	0	—		6	0
Ipswich Town (dual registration)	2022–23	FA Women's National League Southern Premier Division	13	8	1	0	—		—		2 (Note: Appearances in FA Women's National League Cup)	0	16	8
Charlton Athletic (loan)	2023–24	Women's Championship	16	0	1	1	3	0	—		—		20	1
London City Lionesses (loan)	2024–25	Women's Championship	8	0	—		—		—		—		8	0
London City Lionesses	2025–26	WSL	18	6	2	0	2	0	—		—		22	6
London City Lionesses	2026–27	WSL	5	0	0	0	2	0	—		—		7	0
London City Lionesses	Total		23	6	2	0	4	0	—		—		29	6
Career total			62	14	7	1	7	0	1	0	2	0	79	15

=== International ===
As of match played 13 October 2026

Appearances and goals by national team and year
National team	Year	Apps	Goals
England	2026	1	0
Total		1	0
