= Poppy Pattinson =

English footballer (born 2000)

- Pattinson in 2026

Personal information
- Full name: Poppy Olivia Pattinson
- Date of birth: 30 April 2000 (age 26)
- Place of birth: Houghton-le-Spring, England
- Height: 1.67 m (5 ft 6 in)
- Position: Left-back

Team information
- Current team: London City Lionesses
- Number: 3

Youth career
- 2008–2013: Sunderland
- 2013–2015: Middlesbrough

Senior career*
Years	Team	Apps	(Gls)
2015–2017	Sunderland	4	(0)
2017–2018	Manchester City	0	(0)
2018–2020	Bristol City	25	(0)
2020–2022	Everton	28	(0)
2022–2025	Brighton & Hove Albion	55	(0)
2025–	London City Lionesses	20	(1)

International career^{‡}
2016–2017	England U17	9	(1)
2018–2019	England U19	14	(0)
2019–2020	England U21	3	(0)
2022–2024	England U23	16	(1)
2026–	England	1	(0)
- * Club domestic league appearances and goals as of 8 November 2026 ‡ National team caps and goals as of 3 March 2026

Poppy Olivia Pattinson (born 30 April 2000) is an English professional footballer who plays as a left-back for Women's Super League club London City Lionesses and the England national team. She previously played for Sunderland, Manchester City, Bristol City, Everton and Brighton & Hove Albion, and from under-17 to under-23 youth level with England.

== Club career ==
=== Early years ===
Pattinson started her youth career at Sunderland Girls' Academy where she played from the age of 8 until she was 13 years old. In 2013, Pattinson moved to play at Middlesbrough.

=== Sunderland ===
In 2015, Pattinson returned to Sunderland. She made two WSL 1 appearances for the club during the 2017 Spring Series.

=== Manchester City ===
Ahead of the 2017–18 season, Pattinson signed for Manchester City. On 20 August 2017, she made an appearance for the senior team in a preseason friendly defeat to Bundesliga side 1. FFC Frankfurt. Pattinson was involved in one senior competitive matchday squad, as an unused substitute in a WSL Cup group stage victory over Doncaster Rovers Belles in December 2017. Manchester City's Development team won both the FA WSL Academy League Northern Division and the Development League Cup in a 3–1 victory over Birmingham City Academy in 2017–18. Pattinson made 15 appearances across both competitions.

=== Bristol City ===
Pattinson signed for Bristol City in August 2018. Signed in the first window under new manager Tanya Oxtoby, she became an integral part of the team, appearing in all but one WSL game as Bristol finished 6th. A foot injury caused Pattinson to miss the first half of the 2019–20 season, only returning to the side in December as the team battled relegation. She spent two seasons with the club, deciding to leave after the expiration of her contract in June 2020 despite what the club admitted in their statement was substantial offer to retain her services.

=== Everton ===
On 7 July 2020, it was announced Pattinson had signed a two-year deal with Everton. She left Everton at the end of her contract in June 2022.

=== Brighton & Hove Albion ===
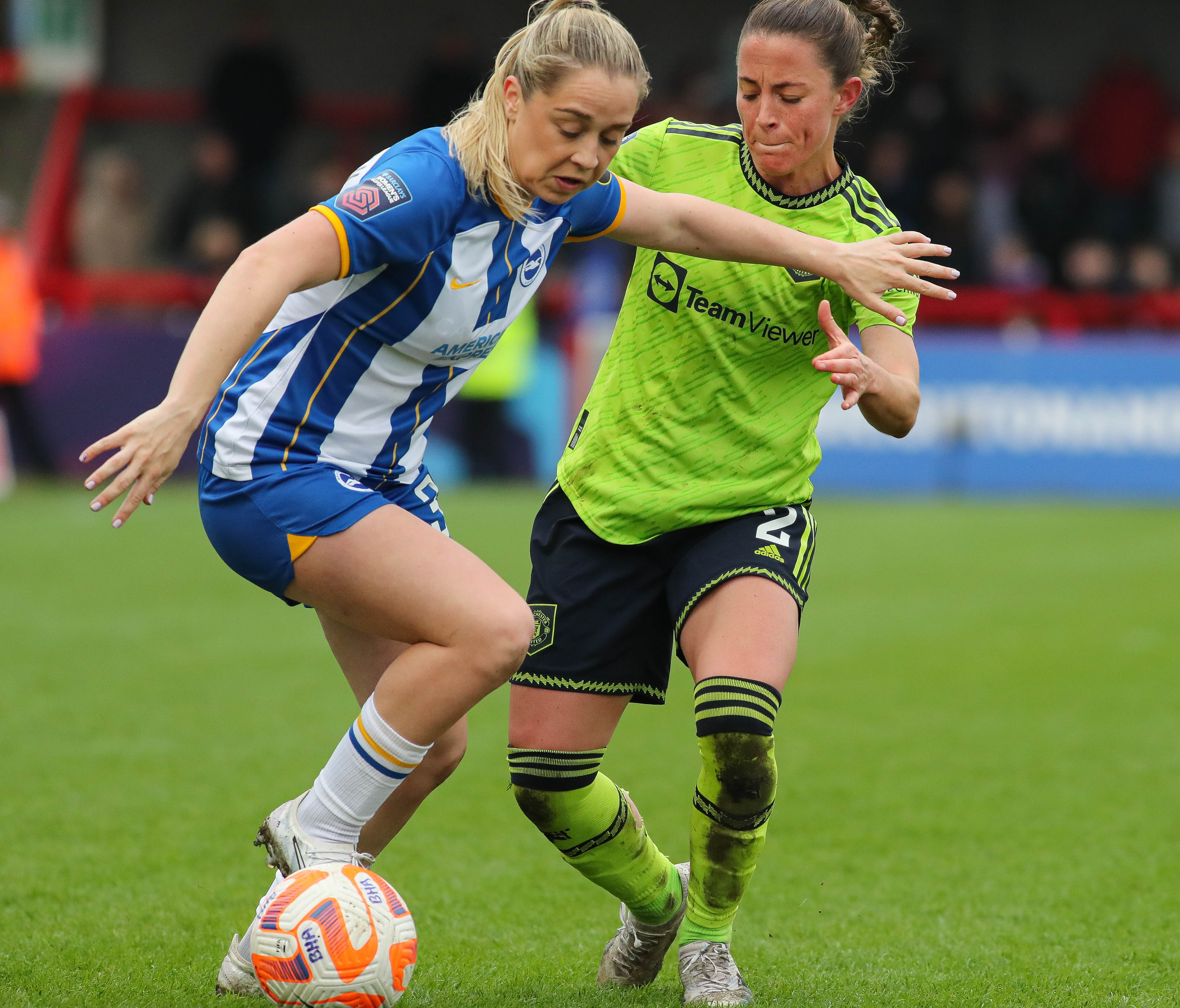
Pattinson (left) playing against Ona Batlle of Manchester United, April 2023

On 13 July 2022, Pattinson signed a two-year contract with Brighton & Hove Albion. She scored her first goal for the club on 19 March 2023, in a 2–0 away win at Birmingham City in the Women's FA Cup.

On 5 May 2025, it was announced that Pattinson would be leaving Brighton when her contract expires in June 2025.

=== London City Lionesses ===
On 8 July 2025, it was announced that Pattinson had signed for London City Lionesses. She missed the first half of the 2025–26 season through injury, which she described as the "biggest low" of her career up to that point. A year later, on 26 June 2026, she extended her contract with the club until 2029. On 4 September 2026, she came off the bench for an injured Lucía Corrales in the second half, of the opening match of the season. Which ended in a home win of 2-1 against Manchester United.

== International career ==
=== Youth ===
Pattinson has represented England at under-17, under-19, under-21 and under-23 level.

In 2017, Pattinson was part of the squad that competed at the 2017 UEFA Women's Under-17 Championship in the Czech Republic. She scored England's first goal of the tournament, a 9th-minute strike in a 5–0 win over the Republic of Ireland. In 2017, Pattinson was part of the squad that went through 2018 Under-19 Championship qualification, eventually losing out to Germany in the elite round. The team did however qualify the following year with Pattinson playing five times during both stages of 2019 Under-19 Championship qualification.

On 1 June 2019, Pattinson was called up for the under-21 team for the U23 Open Nordic Tournament, appearing in a 4–1 over the Netherlands. She was involved with the under-21 team again in March 2020 for a double-header of friendlies against France with England winning both.

Pattinson was named in the under-23 squad for friendly games away to Portugal and Belgium during April 2023, for games away to Norway and home to Belgium in September 2023, and games away to Italy and home to Portugal during October 2023. On 26 October 2023 Pattinson scored in the 1–1 draw away to Italy. She was again named in the U23 team for fixtures in December 2023 and February 2024.

=== Senior ===
In February 2026, Pattinson received her first call up to the senior England team, alongside London City teammate Freya Godfrey, for 2027 FIFA Women's World Cup qualification matches against Ukraine and Iceland the following month. She missed the initial call from manager Sarina Wiegman as she was on a flight at the time, only realising when she landed that she had been called up to the team. She made her senior debut in the match against Ukraine on 3 March, coming on as a half-time substitute in a 6–1 victory at the Mardan Sports Complex in Aksu, Antalya.

== Career statistics ==
=== Club ===
As of match played 8 November 2026.

Appearances and goals by club, season and competition
Club	Season	League			FA Cup		League Cup		Total	
Club	Season	Division	Apps	Goals	Apps	Goals	Apps	Goals	Apps	Goals
Sunderland	2017	Women's Super League	2	0	0	0	0	0	2	0
Manchester City	2017–18	Women's Super League	0	0	0	0	0	0	0	0
Bristol City	2018–19	Women's Super League	19	0	1	0	5	0	25	0
Bristol City	2019–20	Women's Super League	6	0	2	0	0	0	8	0
Bristol City	Total		25	0	3	0	5	0	33	0
Everton	2020–21	Women's Super League	11	0	2	1	3	0	16	1
Everton	2021–22	Women's Super League	17	0	3	0	3	0	23	0
Everton	Total		28	0	5	1	6	0	39	1
Brighton & Hove Albion	2022–23	Women's Super League	21	0	4	1	3	0	28	0
Brighton & Hove Albion	2023–24	Women's Super League	16	0	2	0	3	0	21	0
Brighton & Hove Albion	2024–25	Women's Super League	18	0	2	0	4	0	24	0
Brighton & Hove Albion	Total		55	0	8	1	10	0	73	1
London City Lionesses	2025–26	Women's Super League	13	0	2	0	0	0	15	0
London City Lionesses	2026–27	Women's Super League	7	1	0	0	2	0	9	1
London City Lionesses	Total		20	1	2	0	2	0	24	1
Career total			130	1	18	3	23	0	171	3

=== International ===
As of match played 3 March 2026

Appearances and goals by national team and year
National team	Year	Apps	Goals
England	2026	1	0
Total		1	0
