= Isobel Goodwin =

English footballer (born 2002)

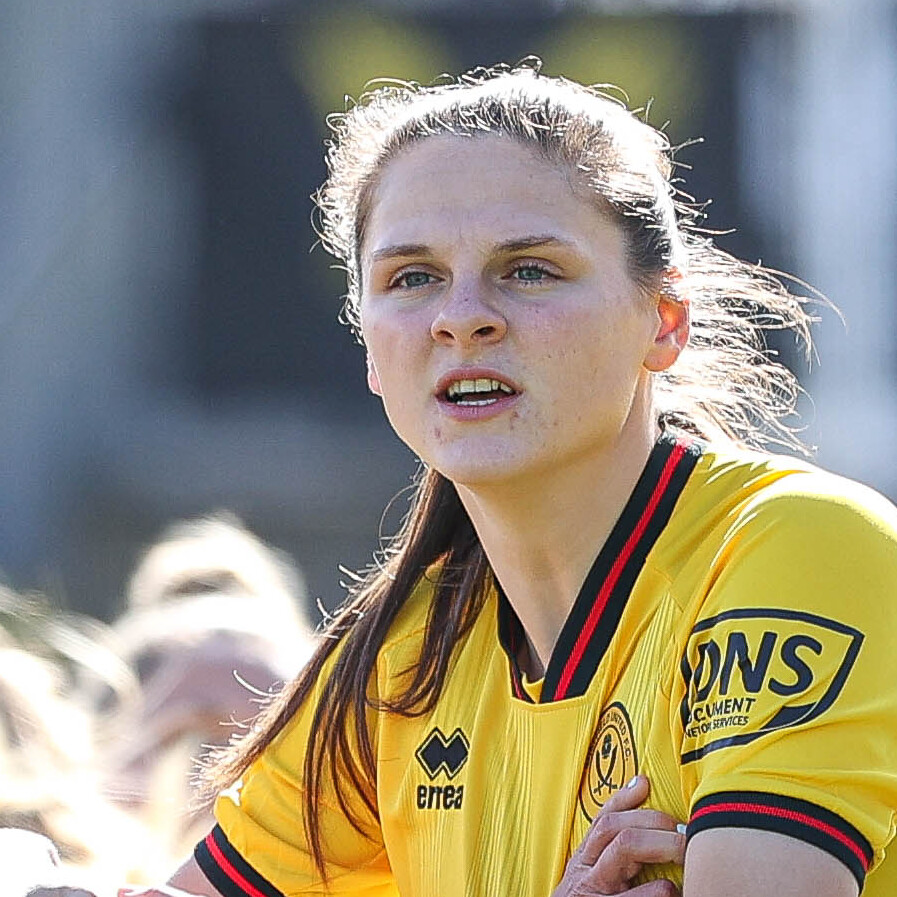
- Goodwin playing for Sheffield United in 2024

Personal information
- Date of birth: 21 December 2002 (age 23)
- Place of birth: Derby, England
- Height: 5 ft 11 in (1.80 m)
- Position: Forward

Team information
- Current team: London City Lionesses
- Number: 23

Youth career
- –2021: Aston Villa

Senior career*
Years	Team	Apps	(Gls)
2021–2023	Aston Villa	3	(0)
2023	Coventry United	10	(4)
2023–2024	Sheffield United	19	(15)
2024–	London City Lionesses	45	(24)

International career^{‡}
2018–2019	England U17	10	(7)
2024–	England U23	11	(5)
- * Club domestic league appearances and goals as of 12:40, 17 November 2026 (UTC) ‡ National team caps and goals as of 12:40, 17 November 2026

Isobel Goodwin "Izzy Goodwin" (born 21 December 2002) is an English footballer who plays as a forward for Women's Super League club London City Lionesses and the England under-23s.

She previously played for Aston Villa, Coventry United, and Sheffield United, and has represented England since under-17 youth level.

== Career ==
=== Aston Villa ===
Goodwin joined the Aston Villa Women's academy, working through the age groups. She made her first team debut on 17 November 2021, in a 2–1 home defeat to Sheffield United in the League Cup.

Goodwin made her Women's Super League debut on 22 October 2022, as a late substitute in a 1–0 home defeat to Everton.

=== Coventry United ===
On 20 January 2023, Goodwin joined Women's Championship club Coventry United on a free transfer after coming to a mutual agreement to terminate her Aston Villa contract.

=== Sheffield United ===
In July 2023, Goodwin joined Sheffield United. She made her debut in the opening match of the season, against Charlton Athletic, and scored her first goal away to Blackburn Rovers.

In February 2024, Goodwin was nominated for the Women's Championship Player of the Month award. The following month, after 13 league appearances, she became second highest scorer with 10 goals, despite Sheffield positioned in the bottom half of the table. Goodwin ended the 2023–24 season with 15 goals in 19 league appearances for Sheffield.

=== London City Lionesses ===
2024-25

On 7 September 2024 Goodwin completed her transfer to London City Lionesses, making her debut following day, as a substitute in the opening league game of the season at home to Newcastle United. For the month of October, Goodwin was nominated for the Women's Championship Player of the Month and Goal of the Month awards, that were both subsequently won by Maria Farrugia of Sheffield United. In November, after her first nine Championship appearances in the 2024–25 season, she scored seven goals, including four against Portsmouth, going on to become the league top scorer with 16 goals in the 2024–25 Women's Championship. On 11 May 2025, Goodwin was named as the Women’s Championship Player of the Season for the 2024–25 season.

==== 2025-26 ====
On 19 September 2025, Goodwin scored her first two goals in the Women's Super League, giving newly-promoted London City Lionesses their first ever WSL victory as they beat Everton 2-1 at Goodison Park. She was also awarded player of the match.

On 9 December 2025, Goodwin signed a new contract with the club until summer 2028.

== International career ==
Goodwin played 10 games for the England U17s – scoring her first and second competitive goals for them on 22 September 2018, in a 7–0 victory over Azerbaijan. In October 2024, she was called up to the England under-23 national team for European League fixtures. On 28 November 2024, Goodwin made her debut for the under-23s against Norway resulting in a 0–0 draw. She scored the opening goal in a 3–0 win over Sweden to win the 2025-26 U23 European Competition title on 17 April 2026.

Goodwin received her first senior call-up for the 2027 FIFA Women's World Cup qualification play-off matches against Ukraine on 17 November 2026.

== Style of play ==
The Guardian has credited Goodwin for her "strength, athleticism and movement" as a forward.

== Personal life ==
Goodwin is inspired by Manchester City striker Erling Haaland and Aston Villa forward Rachel Daly.

== Career statistics ==
=== Club ===
As of match played 15 November 2026.

Appearances and goals by club, season and competition
Club	Season	League			FA Cup		League Cup		Total	
Club	Season	Division	Apps	Goals	Apps	Goals	Apps	Goals	Apps	Goals
Aston Villa	2021–22	Women's Super League	0	0	0	0	1	0	1	0
Aston Villa	2022–23	Women's Super League	3	0	0	0	1	0	4	0
Aston Villa	Total		3	0	0	0	2	0	5	0
Coventry United	2022–23	Women's Championship	10	4	2	0	0	0	12	4
Sheffield United F.C.	2023–24	Women's Championship	19	15	2	3	4	0	25	18
London City Lionesses	2024–25	Women's Championship	18	16	3	2	3	0	24	18
London City Lionesses	2025–26	Women's Super League	22	5	2	0	0	0	24	5
London City Lionesses	2026–27	Women's Super League	5	3	0	0	4	4	9	7
London City Lionesses	Total		45	24	5	2	7	4	57	30
Career total			77	43	9	5	13	4	99	52
