= Wassa Sangaré =

French footballer (born 2006)

Personal information
- Date of birth: 16 March 2006 (age 20)
- Place of birth: Stains, France
- Height: 1.72 m (5 ft 8 in)
- Position: Defender

Team information
- Current team: OL Lyonnes
- Number: 26

Youth career
- 2013–2022: Les Lilas

Senior career*
Years	Team	Apps	(Gls)
2022–	OL Lyonnes	0	(0)
2025	→ Le Havre (loan)	8	(0)
2025–2026	→ London City Lionesses (loan)	18	(0)

International career^{‡}
2022–2023	France U17	10	(0)
2023–	France U19	26	(4)
Medal record
Women's football
Representing France
UEFA Women's Under-19 Championship
Runner-up	2025 Poland
UEFA Women's Under-17 Championship
Winner	2023 Estonia
- * Club domestic league appearances and goals as of 19:36, 3 July 2026 (UTC) ‡ National team caps and goals as of 8 April 2025

Wassa Sangaré (born 16 March 2006) is a French footballer who plays as a defender for Première Ligue club OL Lyonnes.

== Club career ==
Sangaré was born in Stains, Seine-Saint-Denis, France. She began her football career at FC Les Lilas in 2013.

In July 2022, Sangaré joined Olympique Lyonnais and continued her development within OL’s academy.

In July 2023, Sangaré signed his first professional contract with Olympique Lyonnais until 2026. She played her first professional match in December 2023 against Lille, played four league matches during the 2023–24 season, winning the Première Ligue title. In January 2025, Sangaré extended her contract with Olympique Lyonnais until 2027.

In January 2025, Sangaré joined Le Havre AC on loan, to gain more playing time.

On 29 August 2025, Sangaré joined London City Lionesses on loan for the season.

On 3 September 2026, Sangaré extended her contract with OL Lyonnes until 30 June 2029.

== International career ==
In 2023, Sangaré played and won the 2023 UEFA Women's U17 Championship with the France U17 team, defeating Spain 3–2 in the final, securing France's first-ever title in the tournament.

In 2024, she was selected for the Women's U19 Euro 2024. The France U19 team was eliminated in the semi-finals after a 2–0 defeat by the Netherlands. Sangaré scored one goal in the competition in the 92nd minute of the opening match against Serbia, securing a 3–1 victory for France.

== Honours ==
Lyon

- Division 1 Féminine: 2023–24

France U17

- UEFA Women's Under-17 Championship: 2023

France U19

- UEFA Women's Under-19 Championship runner-up: 2025
