= Daniela Arques =

Spanish footballer (born 2006)

- Arques in 2026

Personal information
- Full name: Daniela Arques Lazaro
- Date of birth: 21 March 2006 (age 20)
- Place of birth: Murcia, Spain
- Position: Midfielder

Team information
- Current team: London City Lionesses
- Number: 16

Senior career*
Years	Team	Apps	(Gls)
–2023	Alhama		
2023–2025	Levante	53	(1)
2025–2026	Sporting CP	17	(0)
2026–	London City Lionesses	4	(0)

International career
- Spain U17
- Spain U19
- Spain U20
- * Club domestic league appearances and goals as of 26 September 2026

Daniela Arques Lazaro (born 21 March 2006) is a Spanish professional footballer who plays as a midfielder for London City Lionesses.

== Early life ==
Arques was born on 21 March 2006. Born in Murcia, Spain, she is a native of the city and is the daughter of Mónica and José Francisco. Growing up, she started playing football at the age of eight and regarded Spain international Andrés Iniesta as one of her football idols.

== Club career ==
Arques started her career with Alhama at the age of fifteen, helping the club achieve promotion from the second tier to the top flight and becoming the second-youngest player in the top flight at the time. In 2023, she signed for Levante, where she wore the number fourteen jersey and was regarded to have established herself as a regular starter while playing for the club.

Two years later, she signed for Portuguese women's football club Sporting CP after receiving interest from Mexican, American, and French teams, helping the club achieve second place in the league.

=== London City Lionesses ===
On 29th July 2026, London City Lionesses confirmed they had signed Arques, from Portuguese club Sporting CP subject to international clearance, in a three-year deal. She said "Coming to the UK to play in the WSL is a brilliant opportunity and I'm looking forward to developing as a player and as a person." Arques made her first appearance in the opening match of the 2026–27 season as a late substitute for teammate Cascarino.

== International career ==
Arques is a Spain youth international has represented the country internationally at under-17, under-19, and under-20 levels. During May 2023, she played for the Spain women's national under-17 football team at the 2023 UEFA Women's Under-17 Championship, helping the team win the competition.

One year later, she played for the Spain women's national under-19 football team at the 2024 UEFA Women's Under-19 Championship, helping the team win the competition, before helping them win the 2025 UEFA Women's Under-19 Championship the next year as captain.

== Style of play ==
Arques plays as a midfielder. Spanish newspaper Diario AS wrote in 2024 "committed to her work rate, her creativity increases when she advances into dangerous areas, where she can utilize her excellent vision. This is evident in her long passes, through balls on the edge of the box, and crosses from the wings".
