= Jana Fernández =

Spanish footballer (born 2002)

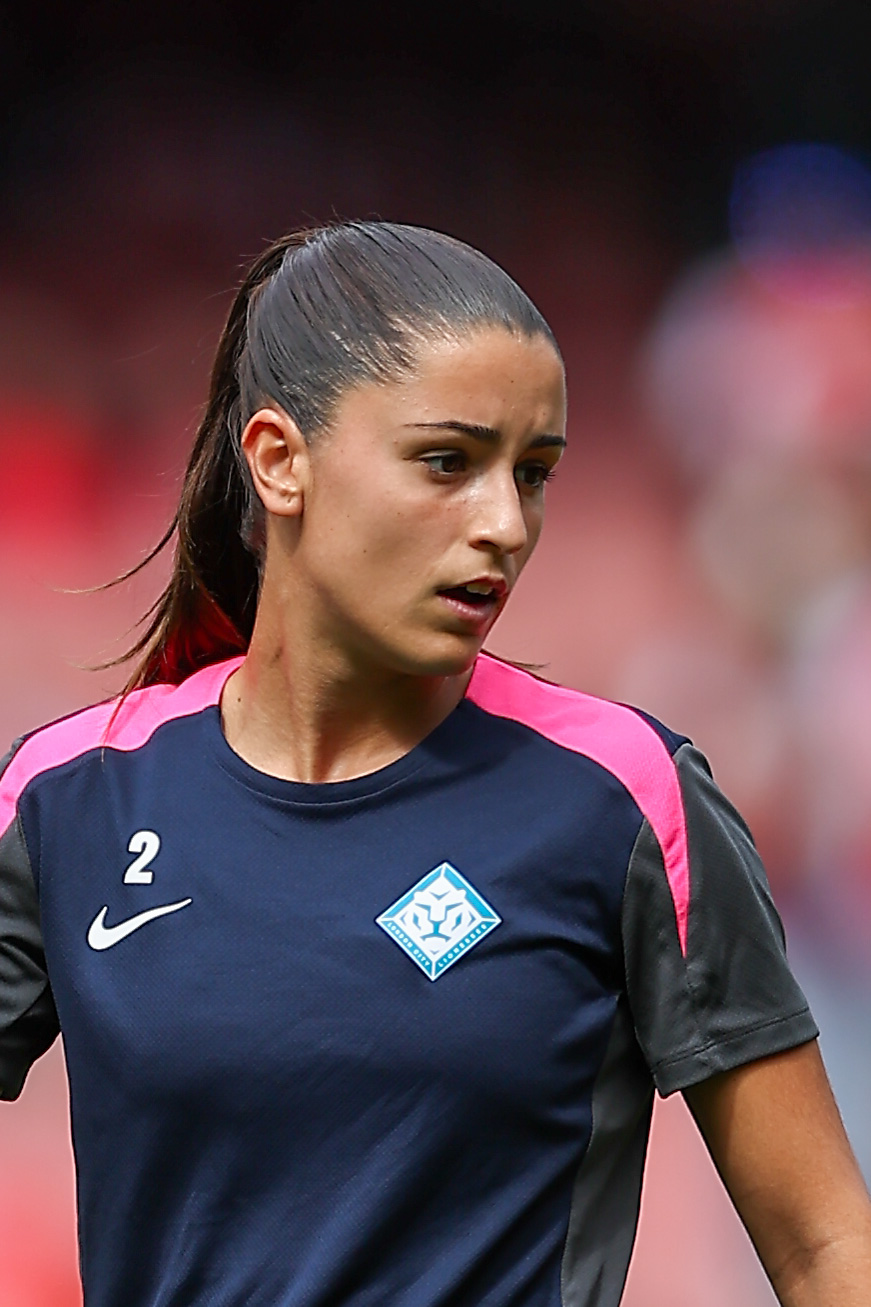
- Fernández in 2025

Personal information
- Full name: Jana Fernández Velasco
- Date of birth: 18 February 2002 (age 24)
- Place of birth: Martorell, Spain
- Height: 1.62 m (5 ft 4 in)
- Positions: Right back; centre back

Team information
- Current team: London City Lionesses
- Number: 2

Youth career
- 2014–2018: Barcelona

Senior career*
Years	Team	Apps	(Gls)
2018–2021	Barcelona B	33+	(3+)
2018–2025	Barcelona	67	(4)
2025–	London City Lionesses	24	(2)

International career^{‡}
2018–2019	Spain U17	17	(0)
2019	Spain U19	1	(1)
2021–2022	Spain U20	2	(0)
2023–	Spain	15	(0)
Medal record
Women's football
Representing Spain
UEFA Women's Championship
Runner-up	2025 Switzerland
- * Club domestic league appearances and goals as of 21 September 2026 ‡ National team caps and goals as of 15:06, 13 April 2026 (UTC)

Jana Fernàndez Velasco (Catalan: [ˈʒanə fəɾˈnandəθ βəˈlasku], Spanish: [ˈɟʝana feɾˈnandeθ βeˈlasko]; born 18 February 2002) is a Spanish professional footballer who plays as a right-back for Women's Super League club London City Lionesses and the Spain national team. She has previously played for Liga F club Barcelona.

== Club career ==
=== Barcelona ===
Fernández was born in Martorell in the district of Baix Llobregat in the Province of Barcelona. She began her football training at FC Barcelona's La Masia academy in 2014 at 12 years old. Fernández made her debut for Barcelona in November 2018 at 16 years and 9 months, while she was still playing with the club's Juvenil-Cadet section. She was the club's second-youngest debutant after FC Barcelona Femení's professionalization in 2015.

In the summer of 2020, Fernández signed her first full-team contract for three seasons. On 10 March 2021, she made her first start in the UEFA Women's Champions League in a 5–0 win against Danish side Fortuna Hjørring. Barcelona went on to win the Champions League that year for the first time in their history. Fernández made 16 league appearances in her first senior season, a competition that Barcelona also won. On 27 May 2021, Fernández made her first appearance in the Copa de la Reina in a 4–0 win against Madrid CFF. Barcelona won the 2021 Copa de la Reina on 30 May and completed the continental treble.

Fernández scored her first goal for Barcelona in 2021 in a 9–1 win against Deportivo Alavés. On 14 February 2022, the club announced that Fernández had torn the cruciate ligament of her right knee and would be out for the rest of the 2021–22 season. She finished her season with 18 total appearances and two goals. Injuries and discomfort continued to keep her playing minutes reduced into the 2023–24 season, though she managed more consistency towards the end of the season and was trusted for defensive security in the league.

=== London City Lionesses ===
On 15 August 2025, Women's Super League club London City Lionesses announced the signing of Fernández. On 22 February 2026, she scored her first goal for the club in a 2–2 draw with Tottenham Hotspur during the FA Cup which ended in a 8–9 defeat on penalties. On 29 March 2026, she scored her second goal for the club and her first in the Women’s super league against West Ham United which ended in a 1-1 draw.

== International career ==
Fernández has played with all official categories of Spanish youth national teams, including their U17s, U19s, and U20s. She was a part of Spain's U-17 national team that won the 2018 U-17 European Championship. By winning the U-17 Championship, Spain automatically qualified for the 2018 U17 World Cup. Fernandez played every match for the Spanish side that won the tournament, the first World Cup won by Spanish women in any age category.

On 10 June 2025, Fernández was called up to the Spain squad for the UEFA Women's Euro 2025.

== Personal life ==
Fernàndez is trilingual, speaking Catalan, Spanish and English. Her high proficiency in English has been widely noted and praised. She credits her knowledge of English to her schooling, frequently chatting with foreign Barcelona players and YouTube, and has credited her English to her relative ease settling in and forming friendships after moving to London to play for London City Lionesses (despite the language barrier between some other London City teammates).

Growing up, Fernández played "a lot" of Minecraft, and still plays the game on her PlayStation. She has encouraged her teammates, namely Danish midfielder Malou Marcetto Rylov, to play the game with her.

Fernández previously dated Dutch midfielder Jill Roord.

== Career statistics ==
=== Club ===
As of match played 16 May 2026

Appearances and goals by club, season and competition
Club	Season	League			National cup (Note: Includes Copa de la Reina, FA Cup)		League cup (Note: Includes Women's League Cup)		Europe (Note: Includes UEFA Women's Champions League)		Others (Note: Includes Supercopa de España)		Total	
Club	Season	Division	Apps	Goals	Apps	Goals	Apps	Goals	Apps	Goals	Apps	Goals	Apps	Goals
Barcelona	2018–19	Primera División	1	0	—		—		—		—		1	0
Barcelona	2020–21	Primera División	16	0	1	0	—		3	0	0	0	20	0
Barcelona	2021–22	Primera División	12	2	0	0	—		4	0	2	0	18	2
Barcelona	2022–23	Primera División	6	1	0	0	—		1	0	0	0	7	1
Barcelona	2023–24	Primera División	9	0	0	0	—		0	0	0	0	9	0
Barcelona	2024–25	Primera División	23	1	5	0	—		6	0	1	0	35	1
Barcelona	Total		67	4	6	0	0	0	14	0	3	0	90	4
London City Lionesses	2025–26	Women's Super League	22	1	2	1	1	0	—		—		25	2
Career total			89	6	8	1	1	0	14	0	3	0	115	6

=== International ===
As of match played 8 March 2026

Appearances and goals by national team and year
National team	Year	Apps	Goals
Spain	2023	2	0
Spain	2024	2	0
Spain	2025	9	0
Spain	2026	2	0
Total		15	0

== Honours ==
Barcelona

- Primera División: 2020–21, 2021–22, 2022–23, 2023–24, 2024–25
- Copa de la Reina: 2020–21, 2023–24, 2024–25
- Supercopa de España Femenina: 2019–20, 2021–22, 2022–23, 2023–24, 2024–25
- UEFA Women's Champions League: 2020–21, 2022–23, 2023–24

Spain

- UEFA Women's Championship runner-up: 2025

Spain U17

- FIFA U-17 Women's World Cup: 2018
- UEFA Women's Under-17 Championship: 2018
