= Isa Kardinaal =

Dutch footballer (born 2005)

- Kardinaal in 2026

Personal information
- Date of birth: 31 March 2005 (age 21)
- Place of birth: Amsterdam, Netherlands
- Height: 1.68 m (5 ft 6 in)
- Position: Centre-back

Team information
- Current team: London City Lionesses
- Number: 4

Senior career*
Years	Team	Apps	(Gls)
2021–2025	Ajax	53	(0)
2025–	London City Lionesses	8	(0)

International career^{‡}
2019	Netherlands U15	4	(1)
2020–2021	Netherlands U16	5	(0)
2021–2022	Netherlands U17	12	(0)
2022–2024	Netherlands U19	24	(2)
2024–2025	Netherlands U23	10	(0)
2026–	Netherlands	1	(0)
- * Club domestic league appearances and goals as of 26 September 2026 ‡ National team caps and goals as of 13 October 2026

Isa Kardinaal (born 31 March 2005) is a Dutch professional footballer who plays as a centre-back for Women's Super League club London City Lionesses and the Netherlands national team.

== Club career ==
Kardinaal was part of Ajax's youth academy, where she played her matches in the Talent Team. From the 2021–22 season, Ajax had regularly added her to the first team selection. In November 2021, she made her debut for Ajax in the Women's Eredivisie, with a substitute appearance against Excelsior. In April 2025, Kardinaal extended her contract in Amsterdam until mid-2027.

=== London City Lionesses ===
On 5 July 2025, after making over 50 senior appearances for Ajax, Kardinaal signed with newly promoted Women's Super League club London City Lionesses until 30 June, 2028. On 4 September 2026, she was in the starting line up for the opening match of the season against Manchester United alongside fellow Dutch teammate Daniëlle van de Donk who scored the winning goal.

== International career ==
Kardinaal has represented the Netherlands at various youth levels since making her debut for the under-15 team in May 2019.

In September 2026, Kardinaal received her first call-up to the Netherlands national team. She made her debut on 13 October 2026 in a 3–0 win over Hungary.

== Career statistics ==
=== Club ===
As of match played 26 September 2026

Appearances and goals by club, season and competition
Club	Season	League			National cup (Note: Includes KNVB Women's Cup, Women's FA Cup)		League cup (Note: Includes Eredivisie Cup, Women's League Cup)		Continental		Other		Total	
Club	Season	Division	Apps	Goals	Apps	Goals	Apps	Goals	Apps	Goals	Apps	Goals	Apps	Goals
Ajax	2021–22	Vrouwen Eredivisie	4	0	1	0	3	0	—		—		8	0
Ajax	2022–23	Vrouwen Eredivisie	13	0	1	0	3	0	4 (Note: appearance(s) in UEFA Women's Champions League)	0	1 (Note: appearance(s) in Dutch Women's Super Cup)	0	22	0
Ajax	2023–24	Vrouwen Eredivisie	16	0	4	0	1	0	8	0	—		29	0
Ajax	2024–25	Vrouwen Eredivisie	20	0	1	0	0	0	2	0	1	0	24	0
Ajax	Total		53	0	7	0	7	0	14	0	2	0	83	0
London City Lionnesses	2025–26	Women's Super League	4	0	0	0	0	0	—		—		4	0
London City Lionnesses	2026–27	Women's Super League	4	0	0	0	1	0	—		—		5	0
London City Lionnesses	Total		8	0	0	0	1	0	0	0	0	0	9	0
Career total			61	0	7	0	8	0	14	0	2	0	92	0

=== International ===
As of match played 13 October 2026

Appearances and goals by national team and year
National team	Year	Apps	Goals
Netherlands	2026	1	0
Total		1	0

== Honours ==
Ajax

- Eredivisie: 2023
- KNVB Women's Cup: 2022, 2024
