= María Pérez (Spanish footballer) =

Spanish footballer (born 2001)

- Pérez in 2026

Personal information
- Full name: María Pérez Rabaza
- Date of birth: 24 December 2001 (age 24)
- Place of birth: Province of Barcelona, Catalonia, Spain
- Height: 1.57 m (5 ft 2 in)
- Position: Defensive midfielder

Team information
- Current team: London City Lionesses
- Number: 6

Youth career
- 2009–2015: Sant Fost UE
- 2015–2018: CF La Roca PBB
- 2018–2020: CF Damm

Senior career*
Years	Team	Apps	(Gls)
2020–2023	Barcelona B	76	(4)
2021–2024	Barcelona	10	(0)
2023–2024	→ Sevilla (loan)	25	(1)
2024–	London City Lionesses	20	(0)

International career^{‡}
- Spain U19
2021–2023	Spain U23	9	(0)
2022–	Spain	6	(0)
2025–	Catalonia	1	(0)
Medal record
Women's football
Representing Spain
FIFA Women's World Cup
Winner	2023 Australia–New Zealand
UEFA Women's Nations League
Winner	2024 France–Netherlands–Spain
- * Club domestic league appearances and goals as of 15:50, 19 May 2026 (UTC) ‡ National team caps and goals as of 23 April 2025

María Pérez Rabaza (Catalan: [məˈɾi.ə ˈpe.ɾes rəˈβa.zə]; born 24 December 2001) is a Spanish professional footballer from Catalonia who plays as a defensive midfielder for Women's Super League club London City Lionesses. A reserve player until 2023, she had already won the UEFA Women's Champions League and every title in Spain at least once with Barcelona, as well as the 2023 FIFA Women's World Cup with Spain.

== Early life ==
María Pérez Rabaza was born on 24 December 2001 and grew up in Sant Fost de Campsentelles, in the province of Barcelona. A fan of FC Barcelona since childhood, her football idol was central midfielder Andrés Iniesta until women's football became more accessible to watch and she began playing as a holding midfielder, at which point she became inspired by Patricia Guijarro and Keira Walsh. In the 2022–23 season she played in the same Barcelona team as both Guijarro and Walsh, with both helping her grow in the position.

== Club career ==
=== Youth career ===
Pérez began playing with the local Sant Fost UE team, staying for six seasons before moving to the Espanyol-affiliated CF Penya Blanc i Blava La Roca for three. She then spent two years with the specialist youth team CF Damm; in the 2018–19 season she helped the team win the double of the preferente league and youth Copa Catalunya, denying Barcelona's youth section both titles. She was made one of Damm's captains for the 2019–20 season. Her coach at Damm, Juli García, first moved her to the 'number 6' role, needing someone to play in defensive midfield and having Pérez adapt.

=== Barcelona ===
She signed to the Barcelona femení B team in 2020. She first played in the Primera División with first team FC Barcelona Femení on 22 June 2021, just in time to see the team collect a continental treble. Barcelona coach Lluís Cortés saw in her what he called the rare qualities of a true defensive midfielder, wanting to bring her in and develop her in the pivot role for the club.

She scored a goal for Barcelona in the 2021–22 pre-season, getting call-ups throughout this season and playing in eight matches in all competitions for the first team. For the 2022–23 season, she captained the B team. She got her first start with the first team in November 2022, playing all 90 minutes. In January 2022 she started as a centre-back in their Copa de la Reina match against Osasuna, which Barcelona won 9–0 but was given as a technical win in favour of Osasuna.

Having appeared for both Barcelona and the B team in the 2022–23 league season, Pérez won both leagues (the Primera División and Primera Federación respectively) on the same day, 30 April 2023, both with matches to spare. She also won the Supercopa de España and UEFA Women's Champions League with the first team in 2022–23; she had spent most of the season training with the first team, and when her B team contract expired in June 2023 she renewed with a permanent first team contract.

With both Pérez and Barcelona wanting her to have more top-flight playing experience, she was sent on a closed one-year loan to Sevilla ahead of the 2023–24 season. The same loan move had previously been completed by Barcelona teammates Clàudia Pina and Cata Coll, with success.

=== London City Lionesses ===
On 14 June 2024, Pérez signed with London City Lionesses on a two-year deal for an undisclosed fee. On 10 June 2026, It was announced that Pérez had signed a new contract until the summer of 2028. Having made 10 WSL appearances for London City in 2025–26, the Lionesses inaugural season in the top tier of the Women's Super League. The Spanish midfielder said: "I'm so happy to be extending my contract. I feel settled at the club, in the country and the league and it was an easy decision."

== International career ==
Pérez represented Spain at under-19 and under-23 before being called up to the senior team in November 2022 at the age of 20, leaving an ongoing under-23 training camp to join them, while still primarily registered with Barcelona B in the country's second league division and having only played 97 minutes of top-flight football during the season. Replacing an injured player, Pérez's call-up was considered surprising, given her relative inexperience, and seen as manager Jorge Vilda calling on younger players to avoid having to acknowledge the fifteen players who had withdrawn from selection. Pérez made her senior international debut as a substitute against Japan on 15 November 2022.

In April 2023, she was again taken from the under-23 training to join the senior squad when another player had to withdraw injured, before being outright named to the squad for the 2023 FIFA Women's World Cup in June 2023. On selecting Pérez for the World Cup, Vilda said that she is the player most similar to Sergio Busquets that was available to him; he was impressed with her quality in training camps and she was given her first international start for the pre-tournament friendly against Panama.

At the World Cup, Pérez made one appearance, as the first substitute (replacing Teresa Abelleira) in Spain's 5–1 knock-out victory against Switzerland on 5 August 2023, the first time Spain had ever won a knock-out match in a tournament. After the game, Pérez swapped shirts with Barcelona teammate and Switzerland player Ana-Maria Crnogorčević; she then swapped shirts with Walsh after Spain defeated England 1–0 in the final to win the World Cup, having said after the Switzerland match that she wanted to face Walsh at the tournament.

Shortly after their World Cup victory, Pérez and the rest of Spain's World Cup-winning squad, along with dozens of other female players, signed a letter saying they would not accept call-ups for the national team until significant changes were made in the Royal Spanish Football Federation due to the Rubiales affair.

== Style of play ==
Diario AS has highlighted Pérez's possession and close control of the ball as strong, with good movement and an ability to read the game.

== Career statistics ==
=== Club ===
As of match played 16 May 2026

Appearances and goals by club, season and competition
Club	Season	League			National cup (Note: Including Copa de la Reina)		League cup		Europe (Note: Including UEFA Women's Champions League)		Total	
Club	Season	Division	Apps	Goals	Apps	Goals	Apps	Goals	Apps	Goals	Apps	Goals
Barcelona	2020–21	Primera División	1	0	0	0	—		0	0	1	0
Barcelona	2021–22	Primera División	6	0	2	0	—		1	0	9	0
Barcelona	2022–23	Liga F	3	0	1	0	—		1	0	5	0
Barcelona	Total		10	0	3	0	0	0	2	0	15	0
Sevilla (loan)	2023–24	Liga F	25	1	2	0	—		—		27	1
London City Lionesses	2024–25	Women's Championship	8	0	0	0	0	0	—		8	0
London City Lionesses	2025–26	Women's Super League	12	0	1	0	3	0	—		16	0
London City Lionesses	Total		20	0	1	0	3	0	0	0	24	0
Career total			55	1	6	0	3	0	2	0	66	1

=== International ===
As of match played 5 August 2023

Appearances and goals by national team and year
National team	Year	Apps	Goals
Spain	2022	1	0
Spain	2023	5	0
Total		6	0

== Honours ==
FC Barcelona

- Liga F: 2020–21, 2021–22, 2022–23
- Copa de la Reina: 2021–22
- UEFA Women's Champions League: 2022–23; runners-up 2021–22

Spain

- FIFA Women's World Cup: 2023
- UEFA Women's Nations League: 2023–24
