= Sophia Poor =

English footballer (born 2006)

Personal information
- Full name: Sophia Isabella Poor
- Date of birth: 25 June 2006 (age 20)
- Place of birth: Leicester, England
- Height: 1.78 m (5 ft 10 in)
- Position: Goalkeeper

Team information
- Current team: London City Lionesses
- Number: 35

Youth career
- Leicester City

Senior career*
Years	Team	Apps	(Gls)
2022–2023	Leicester City	0	(0)
2022–2023	→ Loughborough Lightning (loan)	1	(0)
2023–2025	Aston Villa	2	(0)
2025	→ London City Lionesses (loan)	0	(0)
2025–	London City Lionesses	1	(0)
2025	→ Nottingham Forest (loan)	0	(0)

International career^{‡}
2022–2023	England U17	7	(0)
2024	England U19	1	(0)
2026	England U23	0	(0)
- * Club domestic league appearances and goals as of 10 October 2025 ‡ National team caps and goals as of 17 October 2024

Sophia Isabella Poor (born 25 June 2006) is an English professional footballer who plays as a goalkeeper for Women's Super League club London City Lionesses.

== Youth career ==
Poor graduated from the Leicester City's WSL Academy at age 16 in July 2022.

During her youth career with Leicester City, she played 6 matches for the Girls' Regional Talent Club, follow by 12 starts in 12 matches in the WSL Academy.

== Club career ==
In July 2022, Poor joined National League North club Loughborough Lightning on dual registration loan for the 2022–23 season, making one appearance as a substitute. In December 2023, she was reported to be recovering from a long-term injury.

Having signed for Aston Villa in 2023, on 17 April 2024 Poor made her WSL debut as a substitute to replace goalkeeper Anna Leat, who had been sent off after 4 minutes. She conceded three goals in the 3–0 defeat to league leaders Chelsea, and according to Sky Sports, "struggled throughout the second half with an apparent leg injury". On 28 April 2024 Poor made her first start for Aston Villa in a 1–1 draw to West Ham United, following the suspension of Leat, and was later nominated for WSL Player of the Month for April.

=== London City Lionesses ===
On 27 January 2025, Poor joined Women's Championship club London City Lionesses on loan for the remainder of the 2024–25 season.

After London City Lionesses were promoted to the Women's Super League, Poor joined the club on a three-year permanent deal on 18 July 2025. On 9 August 2025, she joined Nottingham Forest on loan. On 10 October 2025, Forest announced that Poor had been recalled by London City Lionesses after Emily Orman had sustained a fracture to her arm.

== International career ==
In September 2022, Poor was named in the England under-17 squad for 2023 U17 Championship qualification, where in October 2022 she maintained a clean sheet in her debut against Ukraine, followed by conceding one goal against Denmark. In the second round of qualifying in March 2023, Poor kept a clean sheet against Belgium in a 4–0 win, and helped England to qualify with a 1–1 draw against Denmark.

In the final tournament in May 2023, Poor featured in group stage victories over Poland and Sweden, helping England to reach the semi-final of the tournament, where they lost 3–1 to Spain in the final minutes of the game.

On 16 October 2024, Poor was called up to the England under-19 team for Algarve Cup matches against Netherlands and Norway.
