= Teyah Goldie =

English footballer

Personal information
- Full name: Teyah Doreen Bliss Goldie
- Date of birth: 27 June 2004 (age 22)
- Place of birth: London, England
- Height: 1.71 m (5 ft 7 in)
- Position: Centre-back

Team information
- Current team: Crystal Palace (on loan from London City Lionesses)

Youth career
- 2011–2022: Arsenal

Senior career*
Years	Team	Apps	(Gls)
2021–2025	Arsenal	2	(0)
2022	→ Watford (loan)	4	(0)
2024–2025	→ London City Lionesses (loan)	19	(1)
2025–	London City Lionesses	6	(0)
2026–	→ Crystal Palace (loan)	0	(0)

International career^{‡}
2019	England U15	2	(0)
2021–2022	England U19	4	(0)
2024–	England U23	10	(0)
- * Club domestic league appearances and goals as of 15:44, 19 May 2026 (UTC) ‡ National team caps and goals as of 17 April 2026

Teyah Doreen Bliss Goldie (/ˈteɪə/; born 27 June 2004) is an English footballer who plays as a centre-back for Women's Super League club Crystal Palace, on loan from London City Lionesses, and the England under-23 national team. A product of Arsenal Women's Academy, she has also previously played for Watford.

== Club career ==
=== Arsenal, 2021–25 ===
Goldie made her Arsenal debut on 18 April 2021, coming off the bench in a 10–0 FA Cup win over Gillingham. She made her Champions League debut on 18 August 2021, coming on in the 76th minute of a 4–0 win against Okzhetpes.

==== Loan to Watford, 2022 ====
On 22 January 2022, she joined Watford of the Women's Championship on a dual registration agreement. She was awarded Watford Player of the Month for February, but her loan spell was cut short when she ruptured her anterior cruciate ligament against Sheffield United on 5 March 2022.

==== Return to Arsenal, 2022–24 ====
On her 18th birthday, 27 June 2022, Goldie signed her first professional contract with Arsenal.

In August 2023, Goldie ruptured her ACL, for the second time, in her other leg, not long after recovering from her first rupture, joining four other players in the club to have ruptured their ACL within the same period.

==== Loan to London City Lionesses, 2024–25 ====
On 15 August 2024, she joined London City Lionesses of the Women's Championship on a one-year loan.

On 8 May 2025, it was announced that Goldie would leave Arsenal at the end of the season, having started out her youth career with the club in 2011 and making six senior appearances.

=== London City Lionesses, 2025– ===
On 7 July 2025, London City Lionesses announced that Goldie would be signing a permanent contract with the club after her year on loan came to an end.

==== Loan to Crystal Palace, 2026– ====
In July 2026, it was announced that Goldie would join Crystal Palace on loan for the 2026–27 season.

== International career ==
Goldie has represented England at youth level, captaining them at U15 level. She made her England U19 national team debut on 30 July 2021, in a 4–1 win over the Czech Republic

Goldie was called up to the England under-23 national team in October 2024 for European League matches against the Netherlands and Portugal. On 29 October, as part of the starting eleven, she made her debut for the under-23s in a 1–0 win over Portugal.

== Career statistics ==
=== Club ===
As of match played 16 May 2026.

Appearances and goals by club, season and competition
Club	Season	League			FA Cup		League Cup		Continental		Total	
Club	Season	Division	Apps	Goals	Apps	Goals	Apps	Goals	Apps	Goals	Apps	Goals
Arsenal	2020–21	Women’s Super League	0	0	2	0	0	0	0	0	2	0
Arsenal	2021–22	Women’s Super League	1	0	1	0	0	0	2 (Note: appearance(s) in UEFA Women's Champions League)	0	4	0
Arsenal	2022–23	Women’s Super League	1	0	0	0	0	0	0	0	1	0
Arsenal	Total		2	0	3	0	0	0	2	0	7	0
Watford (loan)	2021–22	Women's Championship	4	0	0	0	0	0	—		4	0
London City Lionesses (loan)	2024–25	Women's Championship	19	1	2	0	2	1	—		23	2
London City Lionesses	2025–26	Women’s Super League	6	0	1	0	1	0	—		8	0
Career total			31	1	6	0	3	1	2	0	42	2
