= Lucía Corrales =

Spanish footballer (born 2005)

- Corrales in 2026

Personal information
- Full name: Lucía Corrales Álvarez
- Date of birth: 24 November 2005 (age 20)
- Place of birth: Inca, Balearic Islands
- Height: 1.70 m (5 ft 7 in)
- Position: Winger

Team information
- Current team: London City Lionesses
- Number: 7

Senior career*
Years	Team	Apps	(Gls)
2021–2025	Barcelona B	46	(6)
2023–2025	Barcelona	12	(0)
2024–2025	→ Sevilla FC (loan)	28	(0)
2025–	London City Lionesses	18	(1)

International career^{‡}
2021–2022	Spain U17	16	(4)
2023–	Spain U19	16	(4)
2024–	Spain U20	2	(0)
2025–	Spain	7	(1)
Medal record
Women's football
Representing Spain
FIFA U-17 Women's World Cup
Winner	2022 India
UEFA Women's Under-19 Championship
Winner	2023 Belgium
UEFA Women's Under-17 Championship
Runner-up	2022 Bosnia and Herzegovina
- * Club domestic league appearances and goals as of 4 September 2026 ‡ National team caps and goals as of 10:35, 15 April 2026 (UTC)

Lucía Corrales Álvarez (born 24 November 2005) is a Spanish professional footballer who plays as a winger for Women's Super League club London City Lionesses and the Spain national team.

== Career ==
=== Barcelona ===
Corrales joined the youth academy of Spanish side Barcelona at the age of fifteen.

With wing-back Fridolina Rolfö sidelined at the start of the 2023–24 season due to injury, Corrales was incorporated into the first team, playing strongly and demonstrating a playing identity on the pitch. Though playing less when Rolfö returned, Corrales' performances positioned her as "the natural replacement on the left side."

=== London City Lionesses ===
On 4 September 2025, Corrales signed for Women's Super League club London City Lionesses, after triggering Barcelona's release clause of approximately £430,000. The team competes in the first tier of English women's football. The Lionesses are the first fully independent team to be promoted to the top women’s league.

On 4 September 2026, she was in the starting line up for the opening match of the season against Manchester United which ended in a 2-1 win for London City at home.

== International career ==
Corrales represented Spain internationally at the 2022 FIFA U-17 Women's World Cup.

== Style of play ==
Corrales mainly operates as a winger and has been described as "one of those left-footed wingers that no longer exist. An endangered species that is difficult to find due to its versatility, being effective, disciplined and very difficult to overcome in its defensive aspect and a real dagger in attack".

== Personal life ==
Corrales is a native of Mallorca, Spain.

== Career statistics ==
=== Club ===
As of match played 16 May 2026

Appearances and goals by club, season and competition
Club	Season	League			National cup (Note: includes Copa de la Reina, Women's FA Cup)		League cup (Note: includes Women's League Cup)		Continental (Note: Appearances in UEFA Women's Champions League)		Total	
Club	Season	Division	Apps	Goals	Apps	Goals	Apps	Goals	Apps	Goals	Apps	Goals
Barcelona B	2021–22	Segunda División Pro	18	3	—		—		—		18	3
Barcelona B	2022–23	Primera Federación	22	3	—		—		—		22	3
Barcelona B	2023–24	Primera Federación	6	0	—		—		—		6	0
Barcelona B	Total		46	6	0	0	0	0	0	0	46	6
Barcelona	2022–23	Liga F	2	0	0	0	—		0	0	2	0
Barcelona	2023–24	Liga F	10	0	1	0	—		1	0	12	0
Barcelona	Total		12	0	1	0	0	0	1	0	14	0
Sevilla (loan)	2024–25	Liga F	28	0	1	0	—		—		29	0
London City Lionesses	2025–26	Women's Super League	17	1	2	0	2	0	—		21	1
Career total			103	1	4	0	2	0	1	0	110	7

=== International ===
As of match played 14 April 2026

Appearances and goals by national team and year
National team	Year	Apps	Goals
Spain	2025	3	0
Spain	2026	2	1
Total		5	1

Scores and results list Spain's goal tally first, score column indicates score after each Corrales goal.

List of international goals scored by Lucía Corrales
No.	Date	Venue	Opponent	Score	Result	Competition
1	8 March 2026	Mardan Sports Complex, Antalya, Turkey	Ukraine	2–0	3–1	2027 FIFA Women's World Cup qualification

== Honours ==
FC Barcelona

- Liga F: 2023–24
- Copa de la Reina: 2023–24
- Supercopa de España: 2023–24
- UEFA Women's Champions League: 2023–24

Spain U17

- FIFA U-17 Women's World Cup: 2022
- UEFA Women's Under-17 Championship runner-up: 2022

Spain U19

- UEFA Women's Under-19 Championship: 2023
