= London City Lionesses =

Women's association football club in England

- Full name: London City Lionesses Football Club
- Short name: London City
- Founded: 13 May 2019; 7 years ago
- Ground: Hayes Lane
- Capacity: 5,150
- Coordinates: 51°23′24″N 0°1′16″E
- Owner: Michele Kang
- CEO: Martin Semmens
- Head coach: Eder Maestre
- League: Women's Super League
- 2025–26: WSL, 6th of 12
- Website: Official website
Home colours	Away colours

London City Lionesses is a professional women's association football club based in Bromley, England. The team competes in the Women's Super League, the first tier of English women's football. The club was founded in May 2019, as an independent breakaway club from Millwall Lionesses.

== History ==
On 13 May 2019, a statement was released by Millwall F.C. announcing that the board of directors and senior management at the team's official women's affiliate, Millwall Lionesses, had declared their intentions to split from the club, becoming an independent entity and operating under a new name. The breakaway was already agreed in principle by the FA. The transfer of Millwall's Championship licence was officially approved by the FA on 29 June 2019. The newly independent club's operations were funded from 2019 by blockchain entrepreneur Anthony Culligan and his wife Diane Culligan, with Diane serving as chairwoman and running the club's operations.

The start of the 2022–23 season saw considerable optimism from club management after England's triumph in the 2022 Euro drove an increase in club season-ticket sales. London City Lionesses hit challenges later that season, however, with their manager Melissa Phillips resigning in January 2023 to take an assistant manager role with Angel City FC, despite the club sitting in first place. In June 2023, all 20 of the club's players sent a collective message to owner Diane Culligan asking her to sell the club or raise additional investment, citing financial instability, a lack of players signed for the upcoming season and the lack of a permanent manager. On 15 December 2023, the Culligans sold the club to entrepreneur and Washington Spirit owner Michele Kang for an undisclosed price.

On 27 June 2024 Kang announced the signing of Kosovare Asllani, captain of the Sweden national side, and the appointment of Jocelyn Prêcheur, formerly of Paris St Germain, as the new manager. The signing of Asllani, who has previously played for Manchester City, Real Madrid and AC Milan, was described as "a statement of intent that will have raised eyebrows around the global women's game." It was also announced that the club would move from Princes Park in Dartford, Kent to Hayes Lane in Bromley under a ground-sharing agreement with Bromley F.C. The club also purchased Cobdown Park, a 23-acre site in Aylesford, Kent with the aim of developing a world-class training facility there.

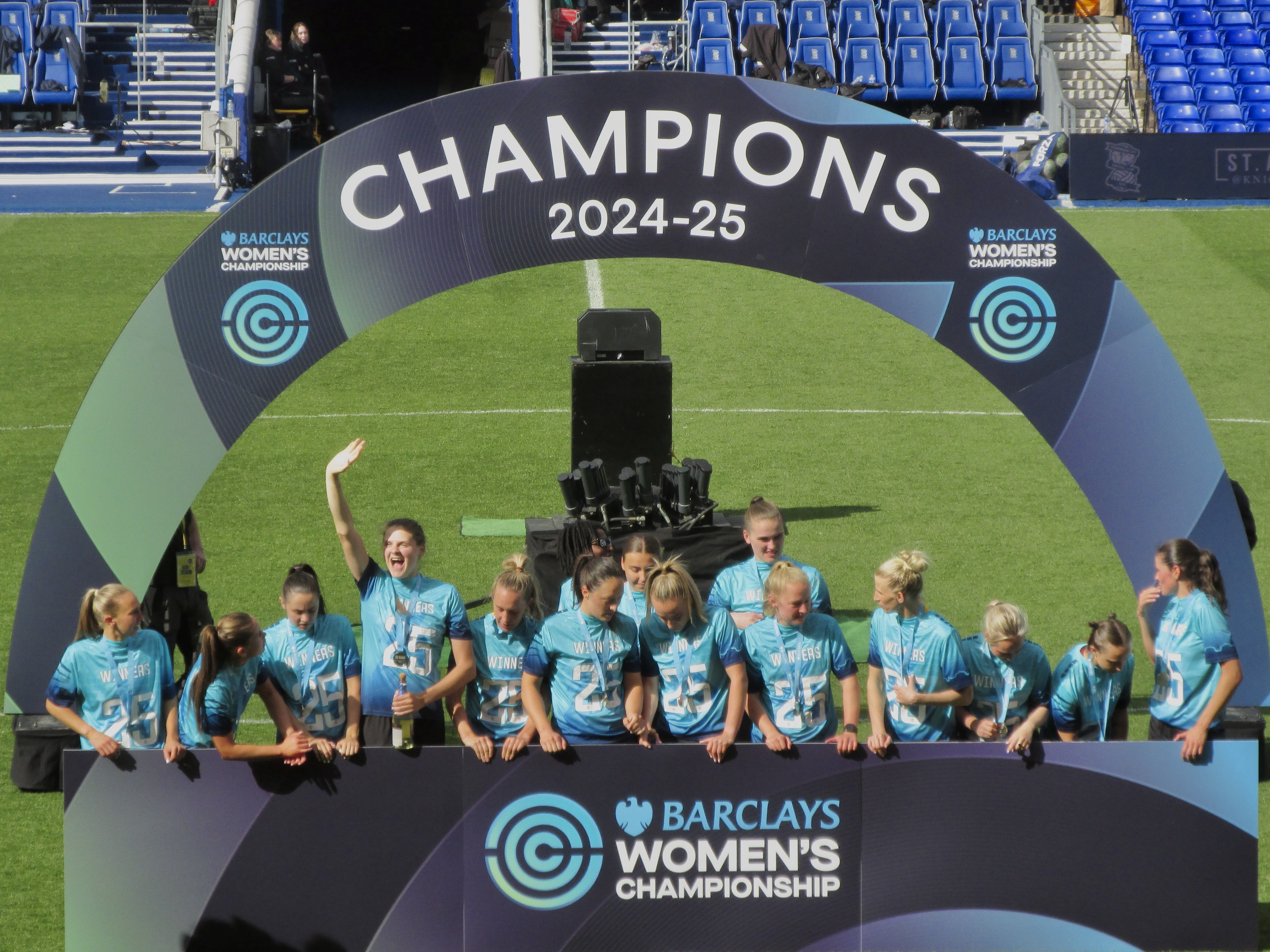
London City Lionesses about to receive the 2024–25 Women's Championship trophy, St Andrews, Birmingham

On 27 July 2024, Kang announced the launch of Kynisca Sports International Ltd., a worldwide multi-team organisation to provide the infrastructure to support the development of London City Lionesses alongside sister clubs Washington Spirit and OL Lyonnes. Under Kynisca, it was intended that each club would retain its own established identity, but that there would be a shared, central capability for aspects such as performance science and technology, data analytics, global scouting, and sporting staff development.

On 4 May 2025, London City Lionesses became the first fully independent team to be promoted to the top women's league (Women's Super League), after drawing with Birmingham City in the final game of the season. The promotion-deciding final match was the first time a game in the Women's Championship, the second tier of the WSL, was broadcast live on Sky Sports as well as being available on YouTube.

== Stadium ==
Between 2019 and 2024, London City Lionesses ground-shared with Dartford F.C. at their Princes Park stadium. The club moved to Bromley F.C.'s Hayes Lane ahead of the 2024-25 season. In 2026, it was announced that the club had held talks with the Mayor of London regarding a potential move to the 15,500 capacity athletics stadium at the Crystal Palace National Sports Centre.

== Training facilities ==
In June 2024, London City Lionesses confirmed the acquisition of Cobdown Park, becoming its sole owners and marking the start of their investment into bespoke women centric training facilities. The 28 acre site is at Ditton, Kent.

The park has been used for sports since 1931 and has always been privately owned and operated, having been previously connected to the former members social clubs of Aylesford Newsprint part of Reed International a once major paper manufacturer in the area whose parent company KPMG appointed administrators on 24 February 2015 closing with over 233 jobs lost. On 26 September 2025, it was announced that the club's permanent training ground at Cobdown Park had received full planning permission from Tonbridge and Malling borough council in a unanimous vote of their planning committee.

== Sponsorship and partnership ==
Following their promotion to WSL, the London City Lionesses signed a sponsorship deal with Nike on 1 July 2025. Nike became supplier of the club's official kits including home, away and third kits for two years. The kit featured the phrase "Everyone Watches Women's Sports". The deal also included partnership for development of women athletes and community services in London.

== Honours ==
=== Leagues ===
- Women's Championship (Level 2)
  - Winners: 2024–25
  - Runners-up: 2021–22

== Players ==
=== Current squad ===
As of 4 September 2026

Note: Flags indicate national team as defined under FIFA eligibility rules; some limited exceptions apply. Players may hold more than one non-FIFA nationality.

No.	Pos.	Nation	Player
2	DF	ESP	Jana Fernández
3	DF	ENG	Poppy Pattinson
4	DF	NED	Isa Kardinaal
6	MF	ESP	María Pérez
7	FW	ESP	Lucía Corrales
9	FW	SWE	Kosovare Asllani (captain)
10	MF	NED	Daniëlle van de Donk (vice-captain)
11	MF	ESP	Alexia Putellas (vice-captain)
13	DF	ITA	Elena Linari (vice-captain)
14	FW	ENG	Freya Godfrey
16	MF	ESP	Daniela Arques
17	FW	ENG	Nikita Parris
19	FW	GER	Nicole Anyomi
20	FW	FRA	Delphine Cascarino

No.	Pos.	Nation	Player
21	FW	FRA	Kadidiatou Diani
23	FW	ENG	Isobel Goodwin
27	GK	ENG	Mary Earps
28	GK	ENG	Sophie Hillyerd
30	MF	DEN	Malou Marcetto
33	DF	AUS	Alanna Kennedy
35	GK	ENG	Sophia Poor
44	DF	ESP	Mapi León
76	FW	SWE	Rosa Kafaji
77	GK	ESP	Elene Lete
88	MF	FRA	Grace Geyoro
97	DF	DEN	Janni Thomsen
99	DF	USA	Corinne Henson

=== Out on loan ===
Note: Flags indicate national team as defined under FIFA eligibility rules; some limited exceptions apply. Players may hold more than one non-FIFA nationality.

No.	Pos.	Nation	Player
5	DF	ENG	Teyah Goldie (at Crystal Palace until 30 June 2027)
12	FW	ESP	Paula Partido (at Charlton Athletic until 30 June 2027)
15	FW	FIN	Sanni Franssi (at Sunderland until 30 June 2027)
32	GK	ENG	Emily Orman (at Wolverhampton Wanderers until 30 June 2027)

== Club staff ==
As of 18 January 2026.

Position	Staff
Director of football	(England) Ronald Thompson
Chief executive director	(England) Martin Semmens
Head coach	(Spain) Eder Maestre
Assistant coach	(England) Becky Langley
Goalkeeper coach	(England) Sophie Harris

== Managerial history ==
Information correct as of 21 December 2025.

List of London City Lionesses managers
Name	Nationality	From	To	P	W	D	L	GF	GA	GD	Win %	Notes
Chris Phillips	England	13 May 2019	15 October 2019	7	4	0	3	11	16	−5	57.14	
John Bayer (interim)	England	15 October 2019	27 May 2020	14	4	3	7	17	27	−10	28.57	
Lisa Fallon	Ireland	27 May 2020	9 October 2020	5	0	1	4	2	11	−9	0.00	
Melissa Phillips	United States	9 October 2020	24 January 2023	61	31	12	18	92	65	+27	50.82	
Nikita Runnacles (interim)	England	24 January 2023	4 July 2023	12	7	0	5	24	18	+6	58.33	
Carolina Morace	Italy	4 July 2023	7 February 2024	20	7	4	9	29	28	+1	35.00	
Darren Smith (interim)	England	7 February 2024	2 March 2024	3	0	1	2	2	8	−6	0.00	
Remi Allen	England	2 March 2024	9 May 2024	6	4	0	2	10	9	+1	66.67	
Jocelyn Prêcheur	France	27 June 2024	21 December 2025	26	17	4	5	54	25	+29	65.38	

== Seasons ==
Results of league and cup competitions by season
Season	Division	P	W	D	L	F	A	Pts	Pos	FA Cup	League Cup	Name	Goals
Season	League									FA Cup	League Cup	Top goalscorer (Note: Goals in all competitions (Championship, FA Cup and League Cup are counted.))	
2019–20	Championship	15	8	2	5	25	24	26	4th	R4	GS	Elizabeta Ejupi	4
2020–21	Championship	20	6	6	8	19	19	24	6th	R4	GS	Atlanta Primus	4
2021–22	Championship	22	13	2	7	35	22	41	2nd	R4	GS	Karin Muya; Amy Rodgers	7
2022–23	Championship	22	14	3	5	49	20	45	3rd	R4	GS	Sarah Ewens	14
2023–24	Championship	22	7	4	11	26	36	25	8th	R5	QF	Chantelle Boye-Hlorkah	8
2024–25	Championship	20	13	4	3	38	17	43	1st	R5	GS	Isobel Goodwin	18
2025–26	Women's Super League	22	8	3	11	28	35	27	6th	R5	GS	Freya Godfrey	6
2026–27	Women's Super League												
