= Elene Lete =

Spanish footballer (born 2002)

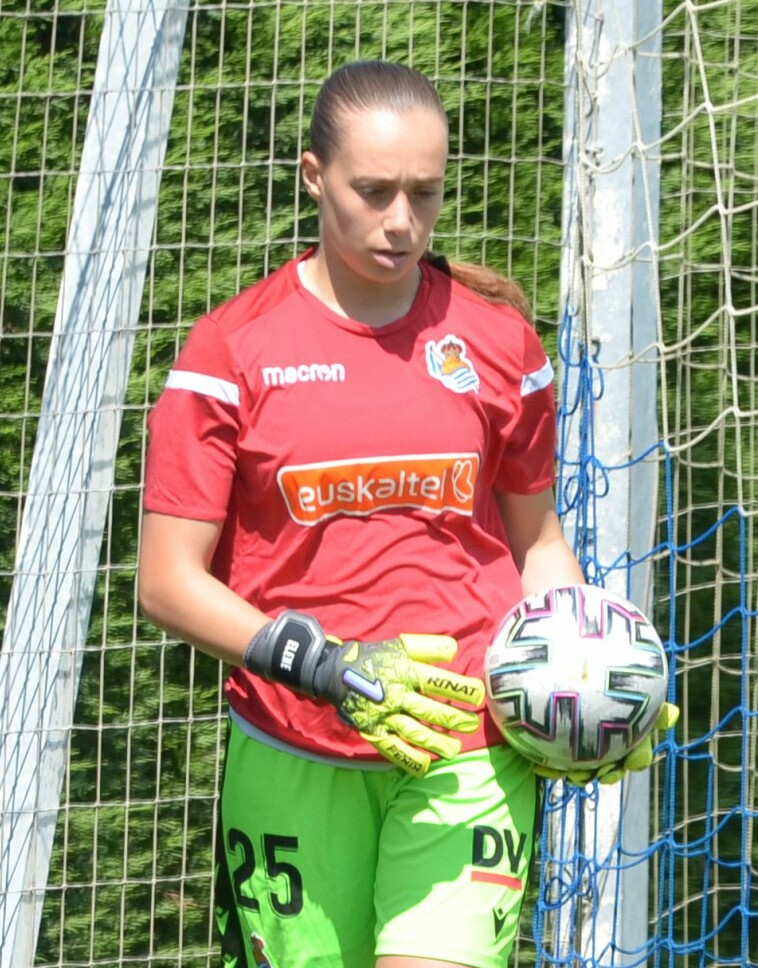
- Lete with Real Sociedad in 2021

Personal information
- Full name: Elene Lete Para
- Date of birth: 7 May 2002 (age 24)
- Place of birth: Zumarraga, Spain
- Height: 1.73 m (5 ft 8 in)
- Position: Goalkeeper

Team information
- Current team: London City Lionesses
- Number: 77

Youth career
- 2016–2017: Urola

Senior career*
Years	Team	Apps	(Gls)
2017–2018	Urola		
2018–2021	Real Sociedad B		
2019–2025	Real Sociedad	92	(0)
2025–	London City Lionesses	23	(0)

International career^{‡}
2022–2025	Spain U23	5	(0)
2023–	Spain	1	(0)
Medal record
Women's football
Representing Spain
UEFA Women's Nations League
Winner	2024 France–Netherlands–Spain
- * Club domestic league appearances and goals as of 4 September 2026 ‡ National team caps and goals as of 05:49, 22 December 2023 (UTC)

Elene Lete Para (Spanish: [eleˈne ˈlete ˈpaɾa]; born 7 May 2002) is a Spanish professional footballer who plays as a goalkeeper for Women’s Super League club London City Lionesses and the Spain national team.

== Club career ==
Lete started playing football in school at the Colegio La Salle Legazpi as a striker. Once she started playing for Urola KE, her local team in Zumarraga, she discovered her skill at goalkeeping, and began her career there.

=== Real Sociedad ===
In 2018 she was signed by Real Sociedad and was the starting goalkeeper for their reserve team. In 2019 she became the substitute goalkeeper for the main team and was part of the squad that won the Copa de la Reina. She made her debut in the Primera División on 30 May 2021 against Santa Teresa. After Mariasun Quiñones transferred to Athletic Club a month later, Lete became the starting goalkeeper. Lete won the Zamora trophy awarded for the lowest "goals-to-games" ratio in the 2021–22 season as Real Sociedad finished runners-up and achieved their first qualification for the Champions League; she kept a clean sheet in eleven matches and conceded an average of 0.6 goals per game. In February 2023, the club announced that it would renew Lete's contract through to the end of the 2024–25 season. As goalkeeper she was key to the "txuri-urdin" squad, although she and Adriana Nanclares shared the goalkeeping duties almost equally.

=== London City Lionesses ===
On 10 July 2025, Lete joined WSL club London City Lionesses, signing a deal that runs until the summer of 2027. Almost a year later, on 8 June 2026, she extended her contract with the club until 2028.

On 4 September 2026, Amid speculation as to which keeper was going to open this season, Ex-United and England goalkeeper Mary Earps started on the bench while Lete stood guard in front of a full crowd of 5,402 home fans, with an impressive 2-1 victory over Manchester United.

== International play ==
Lete has been selected for Spain in the Under-17, Under-19, Under-20 and Under-23 categories. She was set to be involved in the 2022 FIFA U-20 World Cup, however a leg injury forced her to withdraw from the squad.

In 2023 Lete was selected for the Spain senior team and made her debut against the Czech Republic, keeping a clean sheet in a 3–0 win. However, she did not make the final selection for the 2023 FIFA World Cup squad.

== Honours ==
Spain

- UEFA Nations League: 2023–24

Individual

- Zamora Trophy: 2021–2022
