= Malou Marcetto Rylov =

Danish footballer (born 2003)

Personal information
- Full name: Malou Marcetto Rylov
- Date of birth: 16 April 2003 (age 23)
- Place of birth: Egedal, Denmark
- Position: Midfielder

Team information
- Current team: London City Lionesses
- Number: 30

Senior career*
| Years | Team | Apps | (Gls) |
| 2020–2023 | Brøndby | 52 | (13) |
| 2023–2024 | Dijon | 20 | (2) |
| 2024–2026 | Madrid CFF | 23 | (1) |
| 2026– | London City Lionesses | 7 | (1) |

International career^{‡}
| 2018–2019 | Denmark U16 | 7 | (2) |
| 2019–2020 | Denmark U17 | 9 | (4) |
| 2021–2022 | Denmark U19 | 11 | (4) |
| 2023– | Denmark U23 | 10 | (0) |
- * Club domestic league appearances and goals as of 16 May 2026 ‡ National team caps and goals as of 2 June 2024

Malou Marcetto Rylov (born 16 April 2003) is a Danish professional footballer who plays as a midfielder for Women's Super League club London City Lionesses.

== Career ==
Marcetto made a total of 40 league appearances for Liga F club Madrid CFF, scoring 5 goals.

On 3 February 2026, it was announced that Marcetto had joined WSL club London City Lionesses on a two-and-a-half year contract, with Marcetto saying of the move "I'm really excited to be here and get started. In terms of my playing style, as a midfielder, I like to be creative and also work hard."
