= 2024–25 Women's Championship =

Women's Championship
- Season: 2024–25
- Champions: London City Lionesses
- Matches: 110
- Goals: 313 (2.85 per match)
- Top goalscorer: Isobel Goodwin (16 goals)
- Biggest home win: Durham 6–0 Portsmouth (30 March 2025); Newcastle United 6–0 Blackburn Rovers (13 April 2025)
- Biggest away win: Portsmouth 0–5 Southampton (13 October 2024); Portsmouth 0–5 Charlton Athletic (16 February 2025)
- Highest scoring: Sunderland 4–3 Bristol City (3 November 2024); Sunderland 3–4 Charlton Athletic (30 March 2025)
- Longest winning run: (4 matches); Birmingham City; Bristol City; Charlton Athletic; London City Lionesses; Sunderland
- Longest unbeaten run: (11 matches); Charlton Athletic; London City Lionesses
- Longest winless run: (14 matches); Portsmouth
- Longest losing run: (6 matches); Blackburn Rovers; Portsmouth; Sheffield United
- Average attendance: 2,086
- All statistics correct as of 16 April 2026.

The 2024–25 Women's Championship season (known as the Barclays Women's Championship for sponsorship reasons) was the seventh season of the rebranded Women's Championship, the second tier of women's football in England, and the tenth season since the creation of the WSL 2.

Ahead of the season, it was announced that selected league matches would be streamed live globally on the league's YouTube channel. The transition followed the creation and subsequent takeover of the running of the league by NewCo, now known as WSL Football, an independent, club-owned entity which replaced The Football Association after recommendations from a government-backed review into the women's game in 2023.

== Teams ==
Location of clubs for the 2024–25 season

Twelve teams were originally due to compete in the Championship for the 2024–25 season, the same number as the previous season, although this was later reduced to eleven prior to the start of the season. Crystal Palace were promoted to the Women's Super League as 2023–24 Women's Championship winners. They will be replaced by Bristol City who returned to the division following relegation from the Women's Super League after one season. Following a switch to a two down, two up system with the FA Women's National League, the 2024–25 season marks the first time more than one newly promoted team will contest the Championship. Lewes and Watford were relegated to the FA Women's National League, Lewes after a six-season spell and Watford after one season following their promotion the previous year. They were replaced by Newcastle United, winners of the 2023–24 FA Women's National League North, and Portsmouth, winners of the 2023–24 FA Women's National League South. Both these clubs are making their Championship debuts.

On 30 June 2024, it was announced Reading had withdrawn from the Championship and would re-enter at the fifth tier (Southern Region), citing financial issues. The FA confirmed the league would instead operate with eleven teams for the season, reducing from two relegation spots to one. The league will return to a twelve team league at the beginning of the 2025–26 season.

Team	Location	Ground	Capacity	2023–24 season	Manager
Birmingham City	Birmingham (Bordesley)	St Andrew's	29,902	5th	(England) Amy Merricks
Blackburn Rovers	Blackburn	Ewood Park	31,367	6th	(England) Simon Parker
Bristol City	Bristol (Ashton Gate)	Ashton Gate	27,000	WSL, 12th	(England) Stephen Kirby
Charlton Athletic	London (Charlton)	The Valley	27,111	2nd	(England) Karen Hills
Durham	Durham	Maiden Castle	1,800 (League) 2,400 (Cup)	9th	(England) Adam Furness
London City Lionesses	Bromley	Hayes Lane	5,000	8th	(France) Jocelyn Prêcheur
Newcastle United	Newcastle upon Tyne (Kingston Park)	Kingston Park Stadium	10,200	WNL North, 1st	(England) Becky Langley
Portsmouth	Havant	Westleigh Park	5,300	WNL South, 1st	(England) Jay Sadler
Sheffield United	Sheffield	Bramall Lane	32,050	7th	(England) Ash Thompson
Southampton	Southampton	St Mary's Stadium	32,384	4th	(England) Remi Allen
Sunderland	Hetton-le-Hole	Eppleton CW	2,500	3rd	(England) Melanie Reay

=== Managerial changes ===
Team	Outgoing manager	Manner of departure	Date of vacancy	Position in table	Incoming manager	Date of appointment
Southampton	(England) Marieanne Spacey	Change of role	30 April 2024	Pre season	(England) Remi Allen	12 July 2024
London City Lionesses	(England) Remi Allen	End of contract	9 May 2024	Pre season	(France) Jocelyn Prêcheur	27 June 2024
Sheffield United	(England) Luke Turner (interim)	End of interim period	19 July 2024	Pre season	(England) Ash Thompson	19 July 2024
Bristol City	(Wales) Lauren Smith	Resigned	27 August 2024	Pre season	(Wales) Loren Dykes (interim)	27 August 2024
Bristol City	(Wales) Loren Dykes (interim)	End of interim period	19 September 2024	6th	(England) Stephen Kirby	19 September 2024

== Table ==
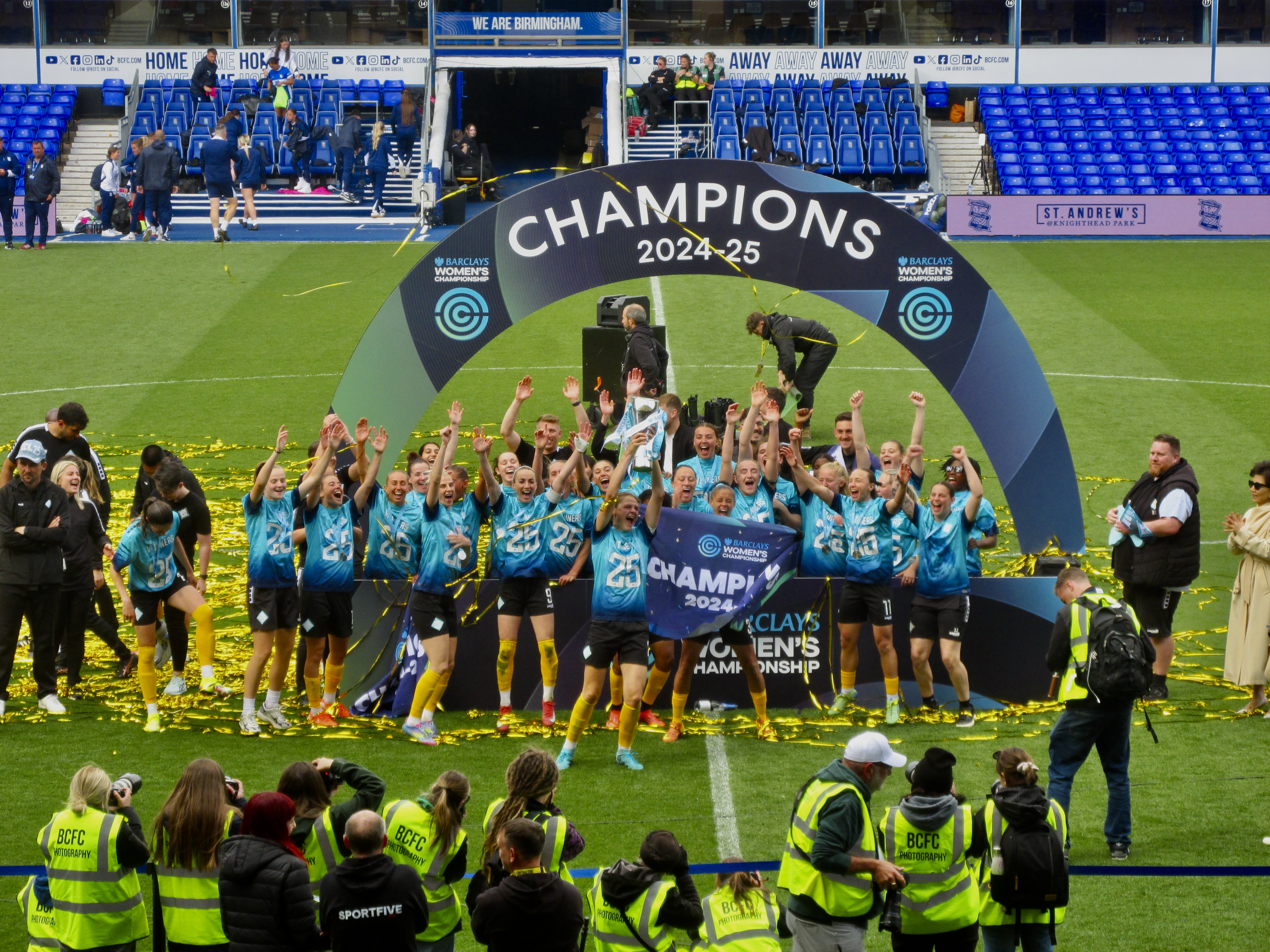
London City Lionesses celebrate with the 2024–25 Women's Championship trophy, St Andrews, Birmingham

Pos	Team	Pld	W	D	L	GF	GA	GD	Pts	Qualification
1	London City Lionesses (C, P)	20	13	4	3	38	17	+21	43	Promotion to the WSL
2	Birmingham City	20	12	5	3	34	15	+19	41	
3	Charlton Athletic	20	10	7	3	38	21	+17	37	
4	Durham	20	11	3	6	35	27	+8	36	
5	Newcastle United	20	9	7	4	38	24	+14	34	
6	Bristol City	20	8	6	6	34	24	+10	30	
7	Sunderland	20	9	3	8	30	34	−4	30	
8	Southampton	20	5	6	9	22	25	−3	21	
9	Portsmouth	20	3	4	13	16	48	−32	13	
10	Blackburn Rovers (R)	20	3	3	14	16	41	−25	12	Relegated to FA Women's National League Division One North
11	Sheffield United	20	1	4	15	12	37	−25	7	Reprieved from relegation (Note: Sheffield United who were set to be relegated to the FA Women's National League after spending seven seasons in the Championship were reprieved from relegation after Blackburn Rovers withdrew from the league on 20 May 2025.)

Source: https://www.bbc.co.uk/sport/football/womens-super-league-two/table
Rules for classification: 1) Points; 2) Goal difference; 3) Number of goals scored
(C) Champions; (P) Promoted; (R) Relegated

== Results ==
Home \ Away	BIR	BLB	BRI	CHA	DUR	LCL	NEW	POR	SHU	SOU	SUN
Birmingham City		2–0	1–3	0–0	3–1	2–2	0–2	4–0	1–0	2–1	5–0
Blackburn Rovers	0–2		1–1	0–2	2–3	1–2	1–5	2–0	1–2	1–0	1–1
Bristol City	0–0	2–1		1–1	5–0	0–1	2–0	1–0	3–0	0–0	2–3
Charlton Athletic	1–1	3–1	1–2		2–1	1–1	1–1	3–0	3–0	0–1	3–3
Durham	1–0	3–2	2–0	1–2		3–2	3–1	6–0	2–1	1–0	1–2
London City Lionesses	1–2	1–0	2–1	2–0	1–1		1–1	5–1	4–0	3–1	2–0
Newcastle United	1–1	6–0	3–2	3–3	0–1	1–2		3–2	2–0	1–1	1–0
Portsmouth	1–3	4–0	1–1	0–5	0–3	0–1	0–2		1–1	0–5	2–1
Sheffield United	1–2	0–0	2–4	0–1	1–1	0–1	1–1	0–2		2–3	0–1
Southampton	0–2	0–1	1–1	0–2	1–1	1–4	2–2	0–0	2–0		0–2
Sunderland	0–1	2–1	4–3	3–4	2–0	1–0	1–2	2–2	2–1	0–3	

Source: Source
Legend: Blue = home team win; Yellow = draw; Red = away team win.

== Season statistics ==
=== Top scorers ===
As of 4 May 2025

Rank	Player	Club	Goals
1	(England) Isobel Goodwin	London City Lionesses	16
2	(Jamaica) Shania Hayles	Newcastle United	15
3	(England) Lexi Lloyd-Smith	Bristol City	10
4	(England) Ellie Brazil	Charlton Athletic	8
4	(England) Eleanor Dale	Sunderland	8
6	(England) Katie Bradley	Charlton Athletic	7
6	(England) Jodie Hutton	Charlton Athletic	7
6	(England) Mollie Lambert	Durham	7
6	(England) Beth Lumsden	Newcastle United	7
10	(Ghana) Chantelle Boye-Hlorkah	London City Lionesses	6
10	(England) Beth Hepple	Durham	6
10	(Wales) Ffion Morgan	Bristol City	6
13	(Sweden) Kosovare Asllani	London City Lionesses	5
13	(England) Aimee Claypole	Durham	5
13	(England) Rianna Dean	Southampton	5
13	(New Zealand) Katie Kitching	Sunderland	5
13	(Northern Ireland) Simone Magill	Birmingham City	5
13	(England) Molly Pike	Southampton	5
13	(England) Sophie Quirk	Portsmouth	5

=== Top assists ===
As of 4 May 2025

Rank	Player	Club	Assists
1	(Sweden) Kosovare Asllani	London City Lionesses	8
2	(England) Beth Hepple	Durham	5
2	(England) Megan Hornby	Portsmouth	5
2	(Sweden) Sofia Jakobsson	London City Lionesses	5
2	(Wales) Lois Joel	Newcastle United	5
2	(Republic of Ireland) Emily Murphy	Newcastle United	5
7	(Scotland) Freya Gregory	Newcastle United	4
7	(England) Jodie Hutton	Charlton Athletic	4
7	(England) Lucia Kendall	Southampton	4
7	(New Zealand) Katie Kitching	Sunderland	4
7	(Wales) Ffion Morgan	Bristol City	4
7	(Scotland) Jamie-Lee Napier	Bristol City	4
7	(Wales) Rachel Rowe	Southampton	4
7	(England) Mari Ward	Bristol City	4
15	(England) Sophie Barker	Portsmouth	3
15	(Wales) Kayleigh Barton	Charlton Athletic	3
15	(England) Natasha Fenton	Sunderland	3
15	(Republic of Ireland) Melisa Filis	Charlton Athletic	3
15	(England) Freya Godfrey	London City Lionesses	3
15	(England) Isobel Goodwin	London City Lionesses	3
15	(Scotland) Christie Harrison-Murray	Birmingham City	3
15	(England) Mollie Lambert	Durham	3
15	(England) Lexi Lloyd-Smith	Bristol City	3
15	(England) Karin Muya	Charlton Athletic	3
15	(Wales) Tegan McGowan	Birmingham City	3
15	(Republic of Ireland) Lucy Quinn	Birmingham City	3
15	(Hungary) Gloria Siber	Charlton Athletic	3
15	(England) Amber-Keegan Stobbs	Newcastle United	3
15	(England) Emily Syme	Bristol City	3

=== Clean sheets ===
As of 21 December 2024

Rank	Player	Club	Clean Sheets
1	(England) Lucy Thomas	Birmingham City	6
2	(England) Fran Stenson	Southampton	4
2	(England) Fran Bentley	Bristol City	4
4	(United States) Tatiana Saunders	Durham	3
4	(England) Claudia Moan	Newcastle United	3

== See also ==
- 2024–25 Women's FA Cup
- 2024–25 Women's League Cup
