= 2024–25 Women's FA Cup =

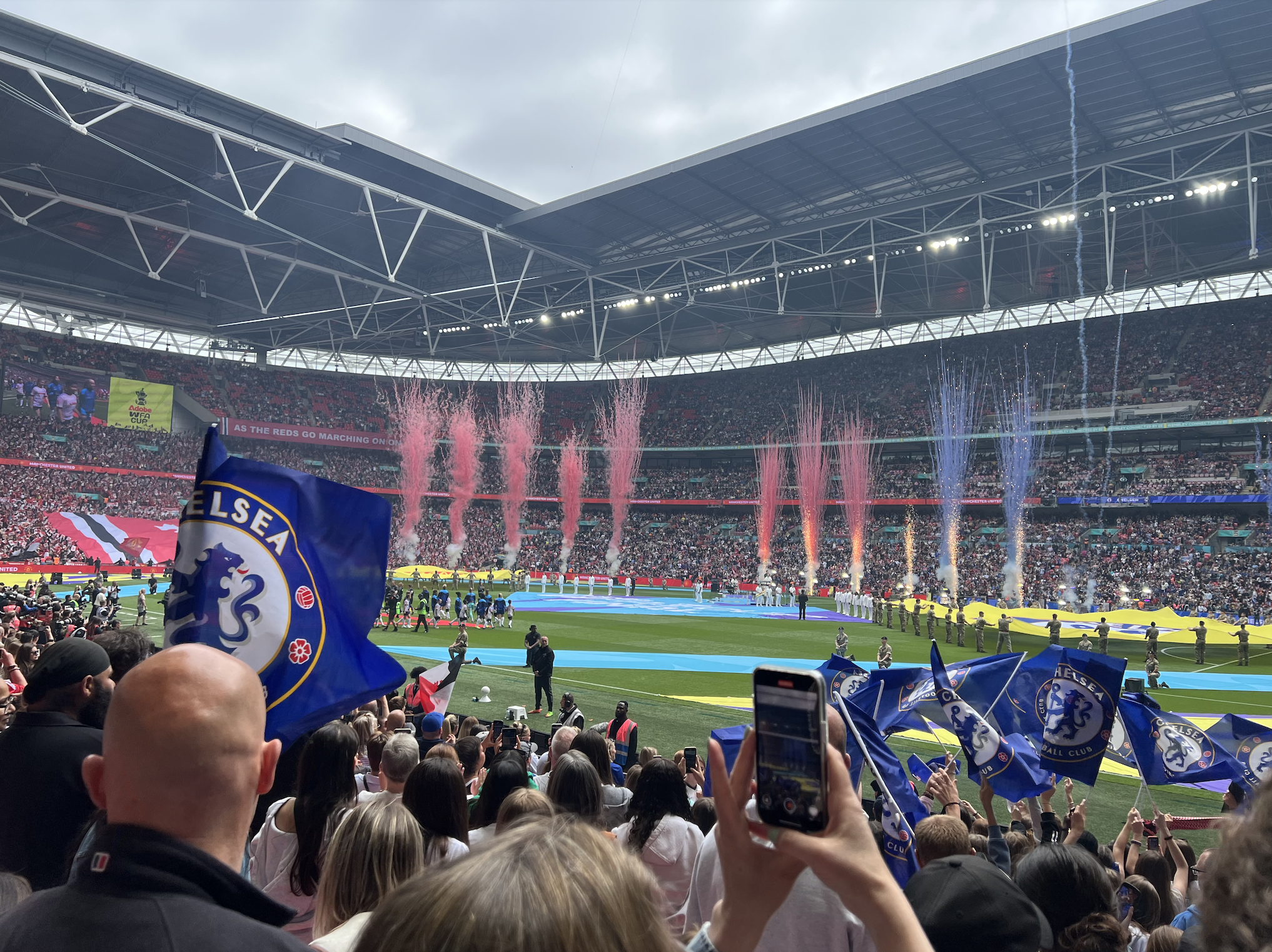
- Wembley ahead of the final

Tournament details
- Country: England; Wales
- Dates: 1 September 2024 – 18 May 2025
- Teams: 514

Final positions
- Champions: Chelsea (6th title)
- Runners-up: Manchester United

Tournament statistics
- Matches played: 466
- Goals scored: 2,448 (5.25 per match)

The 2024–25 Women's FA Cup was the 55th staging of the Women's FA Cup, a knockout cup competition for women's football teams in England. Manchester United were the defending champions, having beaten Tottenham Hotspur 4–0 in the 2024 final on 12 May 2024. They reached the final, losing 3–0 to Chelsea.

== Teams ==
A total of 514 teams were accepted into the 2024–25 Women's FA Cup, an increase of 58 from the previous year. Exemptions remained the same from the previous season: 92 tier 5 teams are given an exemption for the first qualifying round, entering at the second round qualifying stage. The 48 teams that play in the FA Women's National League Division One (tier 4) are given exemption until third round qualifying. Teams in the Northern and Southern Premier Divisions (tier 3) entered at the first round proper, the 11 Women's Championship teams (tier 2) entered at the third round proper, and the final teams to enter the competition, the 12 Women's Super League teams (tier 1), entered at the fourth round.

Round	Clubs remaining	Clubs involved	Winners from previous round	Games played	Goals scored	Prize money	
Round	Clubs remaining	Clubs involved	Winners from previous round	Games played	Goals scored	Winner	Loser
First round qualifying	514	290	–	134	769	£1,800	£450
Second round qualifying	369	272 (Note: 92 Tier 5 regional premier division teams added)	145	133	737	£3,000	£750
Third round qualifying	233	184 (Note: 48 FA Women's National League Division One teams added)	136	91	444	£4,000	£1,000
First round	141	116 (Note: 24 FA Women's National League Premier Division teams added)	92	58	273	£6,000	£1,500
Second round	83	58	58	29	145	£8,000	£2,000
Third round	54	40 (Note: 11 Women's Championship teams added)	29	20	77	£35,000	£9,000
Fourth round	32	32 (Note: 12 Women's Super League teams added)	20	16	78	£54,000	£13,000
Fifth round	16	16	16	8	28	£80,000	£20,000
Quarter-final	8	8	8	4	–	£90,000	£22,500
Semi-final	4	4	4	2	–	£160,000	£40,000
Final	2	2	2	1	–	£430,000	£108,000

== First round qualifying ==
The competition started at the first round qualifying stage with games played on 1 September 2024, and made up of teams from outside the top five tiers of the women's football pyramid.

Tie	Home team (tier)	Score	Away team (tier)	Att.
1	Workington Town (6)	4–1	Gateshead (6)	120
2	Gateshead Leam Rangers (7)	2–0	Hartlepool United (7)	100
3	Gateshead Rutherford (7)	3–2	Berwick Rangers (7)	
4	Stockton Town (7)	3–0	Redcar Town (6)	
5	Darlington (7)	3–1	GT7 (7)	
6	Bedlington Belles (7)	2–6	Boldon CA (7)	50
7	Washington (6)	H–W	i2i International (6)	
i2i International withdrew.
8	Penrith (6)	18–2	Carlisle United (7)	55
9	Consett (6)	H–W	Stanwix (7)	
Stanwix withdrew.
10	Chester-Le-Street United (6)	H–W	West Allotment Celtic (7)	
West Allotment Celtic withdrew.
11	Bishop Auckland (6)	0–13	Thornaby (6)	
12	CLS Amazons (6)	1–2	Birtley Town (7)	50
13	Hartlepool Pools Youth (6)	3–1	Horden CW (7)	
14	Hessle Rangers (7)	0–9	Handsworth (6)	65
15	Guisborough Town (7)	8–2	Cramlington United (7)	
16	Sheffield Wednesday (6)	H–W	Millmoor Juniors (6)	
Millmoor Juniors withdrew.
17	Chesterfield Women (6)	3–0	Grimsby Borough (6)	
18	Wyke Wanderers (7)	6–3	Morley Town (7)	
19	Oughtibridge War Memorial (6)	4–1	Altofts (6)	
20	Mosborough (7)	A–W	Beverley Town (7)	
Mosborough withdrew.
21	Farsley Celtic (7)	5–1	Sheffield United Community Foundation (6)	
22	Brigg Town (7)	1–13	Brunsmeer Athletic (6)	
23	Retford (7)	0–11	Dronfield Town (6)	49
24	Gainsborough Trinity (6)	6–1	Kiveton Park (6)	
25	Grimsby Town (6)	4–2	Lower Hopton (6)	
26	Leeds Modernians (6)	8–1	Bottesford Town (7)	
27	Forge Way (7)	8–0	Cleethorpes Town (7)	
28	Market Rasen Town (7)	1–6	Rossington Main (7)	
29	Buxton (6)	2–6	Chester (6)	
30	Wirral Phoenix (6)	3–1	Ellesmere Port Town (6)	
31	Poulton Victoria (6)	4–1	Litherland REMYCA (6)	
32	FC St Helens (6)	1–0	Rochdale (7)	
33	Penwortham Town (7)	1–0	Alder (7)	
34	Altrincham (7)	1–3	Macclesfield (6)	301
35	Silsden (7)	0–7	Accrington Stanley (6)	
36	Hindley Juniors (6)	0–2	Mossley Hill (6)	
37	Preston North End (6)	14–0	Clitheroe Wolves (7)	
38	Runcorn Linnets (6)	10–0	Skipton Town (7)	
39	Blackpool (6)	2–1	Atherton LR (6)	
40	Morecambe (6)	1–0	Boltonians (7)	
41	Maghull Youth (7)	2–2 (5–4 p)	Northwich Vixens (7)	
42	AFC Crewe (7)	2–3 (aet)	Ashton Town Lionesses (7)	
43	FC Northern (7)	1–2	MSB Woolton (6)	
44	Pilkington (7)	5–3	Radcliffe (6)	
45	Haslingden (6)	8–0	Colne (7)	200
46	Nantwich Town (7)	4–1	Fleetwood Town Juniors (7)	
47	Sleaford Town Rangers (7)	4–2	Kirby Muxloe (7)	102
48	Bugbrooke St Michaels (6)	0–0 (3–2 p)	Rugby Town (6)	75
49	HBW United (7)	0–3	Newark Town (7)	
50	Ruston Sports (7)	0–3	Arnold Eagles (6)	
51	Netherton United (7)	3–0	Whittlesey Athletic (6)	150
52	River City (6)	3–1	Allexton & New Parks (7)	
53	Moulton (7)	1–5	Sherwood (6)	47
54	Leicester City Ladies (6)	5–3	Brookside Athletic (6)	70
55	Wellingborough Town (6)	6–0	Long Buckby (6)	
56	Radcliffe Olympic (7)	1–4	Asfordby Amateurs (6)	
57	AFC Rushden & Diamonds (7)	1–4	Thrapston Town (6)	
58	Birstall United (7)	0–2	Beaumont Park (6)	
59	Cardea (6)	2–3	Sleaford Town (6)	
60	Long Eaton United (6)	H–W	Wyberton Wildcats (6)	
Wyberton Wildcats withdrew.
61	Coventry City (7)	4–1	Eccleshall (6)	228
62	Walsall (6)	2–1	Leamington (6)	96
63	Market Drayton Town (7)	A–W	Bromsgrove Sporting (6)	
Market Drayton Town withdrew.
64	Worthen Juniors (7)	0–7	Hednesford Town (6)	
65	Belper Town (6)	4–0	Albrighton (7)	
66	Droitwich Spa (6)	1–3	Coton Green (7)	154
67	Shrewsbury Up & Comers (7)	1–3	Whitchurch Alport (7)	
68	AFC Telford United (6)	10–0	Newcastle Town (6)	80
69	Redditch United (6)	2–1	Crusaders (6)	86
70	Halesowen Town (6)	9–0	Pride Park (7)	84
71	Kingfisher (7)	1–6	Lichfield City (6)	

Tie	Home team (tier)	Score	Away team (tier)	Att.
72	Milton United (Staffordshire) (7)	3–1	Nuneaton Borough (7)	
73	Borrowash Victoria (7)	2–1	Tamworth (6)	
74	Leafield Athletic Lynx (7)	0–9	Long Itchington (6)	92
75	Mulbarton Wanderers (6)	2–3	Stanway Pegasus (6)	65
76	Fakenham Town (7)	5–1	Stanway Rovers (7)	32
77	Waterbeach Colts (7)	1–4	Brantham Athletic (7)	
78	Thetford Town (6)	2–6	Histon (6)	
79	Lawford (6)	0–5	Newmarket Town (6)	106
80	Woodbridge Town (7)	4–1	Sprowston (7)	
81	Aylsham (7)	1–1 (4–2 p)	Fulbourn Bluebirds (7)	
82	Bungay Town (7)	11–1	Cambridge Rangers (7)	
83	Frontiers (6)	0–2	Toby (6)	80
84	Hitchin Belles (7)	0–2	Wormley Rovers (6)	
85	Harpenden Town (6)	4–4 (1–4 p)	Biggleswade United (6)	
86	Stotfold (7)	0–10	Chelmsford City (6)	
87	Ware United (7)	0–6	AFC Dunstable (6)	
88	Langford (7)	1–3	Oaklands Wolves (7)	
89	Cheshunt (6)	A–W	Leyton Orient (7)	
Cheshunt withdrew.
90	Hutton (6)	2–2 (5–3 p)	Clapton Community (6)	
91	Hertford Town (6)	3–2	Islington Borough (7)	
92	Southminster United (7)	0–3	Hackney (6)	
93	Richmond Park (6)	0–5	Aylesford (6)	
94	Hammersmith (7)	A-W (Note: Despite winning the game 4-0, Hammersmith were expelled from the competition for fielding an ineligible player in the match, with Bromley being declared the winners and reinstated.)	Bromley (6)	
95	Maidstone United (7)	1–4	Tooting Bec (7)	
96	Kings Hill (7)	1–1 (3–4 p)	Croydon (7)	356
97	Tonbridge Angels (7)	0–4	South London (7)	
98	Ashmount Leigh (6)	1–5	Sevenoaks Town (7)	
99	Herne Bay (6)	2–2 (5–4 p)	Margate (7)	130
100	AFC Whyteleafe (6)	1–10	Tunbridge Wells Foresters (7)	
101	Bexhill United (6)	0–9	Camden Town (7)	135
102	Soccer Elite Football Academy (6)	0–3	Cray Wanderers (7)	
103	Denham United (6)	8–0	Ruislip Rangers (7)	
104	Wallingford & Crowmarsh (7)	1–3	Brackley Town (7)	
105	Caversham United (6)	0–5	Penn & Tylers Green (6)	
106	Milton United (Berks & Bucks) (6)	4–1	Slough Town (6)	
107	North Leigh (7)	1–18	Brentford (6)	107
108	Barton United (7)	0–2	Camden & Islington United (7)	70
109	Kidlington Youth (6)	5–1	Headstone Manor (7)	
110	Tilehurst Panthers (6)	5–0	Goring United (7)	60
111	Newport Pagnell Town (6)	2–1	New Bradwell St Peter (6)	
112	Ashridge Park (7)	H–W	Banbury United (7)	
Banbury United withdrew.
113	Montpelier Villa (6)	4–4 (4–1 p)	Bognor Regis Town (6)	
114	Hassocks (7)	3–2	Abbey Rangers (6)	
115	Fleet Town (6)	4–0	Rushmoor Community (7)	102
116	East Preston (7)	0–9	Leatherhead (6)	30
117	Farnborough (7)	0–6	Farnham Town (7)	201
118	Steyning Town Community (6)	H–W	Eversley & California (6)	
Eversley & California withdrew.
119	Horsham Sparrows (7)	1–5	Horsham (7)	
120	Gosport Borough (7)	0–1	Bursledon (6)	
121	Dorchester Town (7)	3–1	Shaftesbury (7)	
122	Merley (7)	4–3	Ridgeway (7)	
123	Havant & Waterlooville (6)	10–0	United Services Portsmouth (6)	
124	Andover New Street (7)	1–3	AFC Varsity (6)	
125	AFC Stoneham (6)	4–1	Weymouth (6)	
126	Longfleet Lionesses (7)	1–4	QK Southampton (6)	102
127	Basingstoke Town (7)	1–2	Longham (7)	
128	Mangotsfield United (7)	1–4	Hereford Pegasus (6)	38
129	Paulton Rovers (6)	1–2	Weston Super Mare (6)	
130	Bath City (6)	0–1	Bitton (6)	168
131	Cheltenham Saracens (7)	0–9	Gloucester City (6)	35
132	Cirencester Town (6)	1–2	Bishops Cleeve (7)	53
133	Bristol & West (7)	2–4	Cheltenham Civil Service (7)	
134	Ross Juniors (7)	1–5	Royal Wootton Bassett Town (6)	196
135	SGS Olveston United (6)	0–2	Yeovil Town (6)	
136	Frome Town (7)	10–0	FC Chippenham (7)	
137	Hereford (7)	5–4	Corsham Town (6)	
138	Signal Box Oak Villa (7)	A–W	Helston Athletic (6)	
Signal Box Oak Villa withdrew.
139	Plympton (6)	6–0	Bideford (6)	
140	Stoke Gabriel & Torbay Police (7)	21–0	FXSU (7)	27
141	Sticker (6)	2–2 (3–4 p)	Saltash United (6)	83
142	RNAS Culdrose (7)	0–4	Saltash Borough (7)	
143	Redruth United (7)	1–1 (4–3 p)	Honiton Town (6)	
144	Bodmin (7)	0–1	Feniton (6)	125
145	Appledore (7)	4–2	Westexe Park Rangers (7)	75

== Second round qualifying ==
The 136 matches of the second round qualifying were played on 22 September 2024. This round included the introduction of teams from the fifth-tier regional first division football leagues.

Tie	Home team (tier)	Score	Away team (tier)	Att.
1	Whitehaven (7)	3–3 (2–3 p)	Darlington (7)	
2	Hartlepool Pools Youth (6)	2–1	Gateshead Leam Rangers (7)	88
3	Thornaby (6)	9–0	Guisborough Town (7)	156
4	Stockton Town (7)	0–6	Sunderland West End (5)	
5	Alnwick Town (5)	2–1	Birtley Town (7)	
6	Chester-Le-Street Town (5)	4–0	Workington Town (6)	
7	Ponteland United (5)	1–3	South Shields (5)	
8	Washington (6)	5–2	Boldon CA (7)	
9	Wallsend BC (5)	2–3	Penrith (6)	
10	Spennymoor Town (5)	2–2 (3–1 p)	Gateshead Rutherford (7)	
11	Consett (6)	3–0	Chester-Le-Street United (6)	120
12	Rotherham United (5)	5–0	Chesterfield Women (6)	
13	Oughtibridge War Memorial (6)	5–3	Sheffield Wednesday (6)	
14	Gainsborough Trinity (6)	2–4	Handsworth (6)	
15	Ilkley Town (7)	0–3	Chesterfield Ladies (5)	
16	Rossington Main (7)	6–0	Beverley Town (7)	
17	Bradford City (5)	4–3	Farsley Celtic (7)	105
18	Grimsby Town (6)	0–4	Ossett United (6)	68
19	Wyke Wanderers (7)	1–6	Sheffield (5)	36
20	Dronfield Town Ladies (6)	1–3	Brunsmeer Athletic (6)	
21	Harrogate Town (5)	0–1	Leeds Modernians (6)	
22	Hull United (5)	3–0	Forge Way (7)	
23	SJR Worksop (5)	3–2	York Railway Institute (5)	
24	Wigan Athletic Girls & Ladies (6)	2–3	Mancunian Unity (5)	
25	Preston North End (6)	6–0	Maghull Youth (7)	
26	MSB Woolton (6)	5–2	Wirral Phoenix (6)	
27	Pilkington (7)	1–3	Chester (6)	
28	Tranmere Rovers (5)	3–1	Bolton Wanderers (6)	
29	Bury (5)	0–5	Curzon Ashton (5)	
30	Wythenshawe (5)	3–0	Salford City Lionesses (5)	
31	Warrington Town (6)	2–4	Accrington Stanley (6)	
32	Haslingden (6)	1–4	Darwen (5)	231
33	West Didsbury & Chorlton (5)	3–2	Morecambe (6)	122
34	Macclesfield (6)	3–2	Blackpool (6)	
35	Penwortham Town (7)	1–3	Crewe Alexandra (5)	50
36	Nantwich Town (7)	3–2	Mossley Hill (6)	
37	FC St Helens (6)	5–0	Poulton Victoria (6)	
38	FC United of Manchester (5)	5–2	Ashton Town Lionesses (7)	90
39	Fleetwood Town Wrens (5)	3–2	Runcorn Linnets (6)	
40	Wellingborough Town (6)	10–0	Netherton United (7)	
41	Long Eaton United (6)	2–2 (6–5 p)	Bugbrooke St Michaels (6)	
42	Beaumont Park (6)	2–1	Coalville Town (7)	
43	Arnold Eagles (6)	0–7	Stamford (5)	
44	Basford United (5)	0–0 (0–3 p)	Sleaford Town (6)	41
45	Dunton & Broughton United (6)	8–2	Sleaford Town Rangers (7)	
46	Mansfield Town (5)	0–1	Ilkeston Town (5)	
47	Sherwood (6)	0–3	River City (6)	
48	Nottingham Trent University (5)	3–5	Leicester City Ladies (6)	
49	Anstey Nomads (5)	7–1	Newark Town (7)	52
50	Asfordby Amateurs (6)	2–1	Thrapston Town (6)	
51	Alvechurch (5)	5–1	Borrowash Victoria (7)	51
52	Inkberrow (7)	1–4	Walsall (6)	
53	Bromsgrove Sporting (6)	1–2	Knowle (5)	151
54	Coventry City (7)	2–3	Redditch Borough (6)	82
55	Coton Green (7)	0–7	Lye Town (5)	
56	Coventry Sphinx (5)	3–4	Burton Albion (5)	
57	Belper Town (6)	1–5	AFC Telford United (6)	
58	Whitchurch Alport (7)	1–2	Long Itchington (6)	
59	Leek Town (5)	4–0	Coundon Court (5)	
60	Lichfield City (6)	0–1	Shrewsbury Town (5)	
61	Sedgley & Gornal United (7)	0–10	Redditch United (6)	55
62	Hednesford Town (6)	7–0	Doveridge (7)	61
63	Shifnal Town (5)	4–0	Milton United (Staffordshire) (7)	70
64	Solihull Sporting (5)	0–9	Kidderminster Harriers (5)	
65	Port Vale (5)	3–0	Halesowen Town (6)	65
66	Needham Market (5)	6–2	Histon (6)	
67	Dussindale & Hellesdon (5)	7–0	King’s Lynn Town (6)	70
68	Stanway Pegasus (6)	4–2	Aylsham (7)	
69	Wroxham (5)	9–0	Fakenham Town (7)	81
70	Brantham Athletic (7)	0–0 (3–4 p)	Long Stratton (7)	

Tie	Home team (tier)	Score	Away team (tier)	Att.
71	Woodbridge Town (7)	0–3	Cambridge City (5)	35
72	Bungay Town (7)	2–0	Newmarket Town (6)	30
73	Stowupland Falcons (7)	A–W	Costessey Sports (7)	
Stowupland Falcons withdrew.
74	Hertford Town (6)	3–0	AFC Dunstable (6)	
75	St Margaretsbury (7)	0–5	Wormley Rovers (6)	
76	Chigwell (7)	0–11	Luton Town (5)	
77	Chelmsford City (6)	0–5	Stevenage (5)	50
78	Barking (5)	4–1	Southend United Community SC (6)	38
79	Bowers & Pitsea (5)	3–0	Toby (6)	
80	Haringey Borough (5)	1–3	Royston Town (5)	90
81	Leyton Orient (7)	11–3	Oaklands Wolves (7)	138
82	Enfield Town (5)	0–1	Hutton (6)	
83	St Albans City (5)	3–0	Biggleswade United (6)	210
84	Hackney (6)	1–1 (4–3 p)	Wootton Blue Cross Lionesses (6)	20
85	Cray Wanderers (7)	2–4	Comets (7)	
86	Aylesford (6)	5–0	Tooting Bec (7)	
87	Herne Bay (6)	1–1 (5–4 p)	Sutton United (5)	85
88	Croydon (7)	1–2	Ashford United (5)	
89	Camden Town (7)	2–3	South London (7)	250
90	Epsom & Ewell (7)	0–13	Fulham (5)	
91	Richmond & Kew (6)	6–1	Sevenoaks Town (7)	30
92	Millwall Lionesses (5)	0–3	Ebbsfleet United (5)	
93	Dartford (5)	4–1	Bromley (6)	
94	Tunbridge Wells Foresters (7)	0–7	Sport London e Benfica (5)	
95	Brackley Town (7)	2–3	Reading (5)	
96	Haddenham (7)	0–1	Camden & Islington United (7)	24
97	Oxford City (5)	1–2	Woodley United (5)	
98	Ascot United (5)	5–0	Denham United (6)	75
99	Penn & Tylers Green (6)	H–W	Long Crendon (5)	
Long Crendon withdrew.
100	Kidlington Youth (6)	0–3	Watford Development (5)	
101	Brentford (6)	12–1	Tilehurst Panthers (6)	173
102	Newport Pagnell Town (6)	5–2	Ashridge Park (7)	102
103	Wycombe Wanderers (5)	13–1	Milton United (Berks & Bucks) (6)	120
104	Selsey (5)	1–1 (4–3 p)	Leatherhead (6)	
105	Newhaven (5)	1–2	Farnham Town (7)	
106	Montpelier Villa (6)	3–2	Three Bridges (6)	
107	Saltdean United (5)	7–0	Abbey Rangers (6)	
108	Fleet Town (6)	8–2	Badshot Lea (5)	151
109	Horsham (7)	2–2 (5–4 p)	Haywards Heath Town (5)	150
110	Eastbourne Town (7)	0–15	Steyning Town Community (6)	
111	Dorking Wanderers (5)	14–0	Pagham (7)	
112	Warminster Town (5)	A–W	Havant & Waterlooville (6)	
Warminster Town withdrew.
113	Sholing (5)	6–0	AFC Varsity (6)	86
114	Bursledon (6)	8–0	Longham (7)	
115	Winchester City Flyers (5)	14–0	Dorchester Town (7)	
116	Merley (7)	1–7	Poole Town (5)	
117	QK Southampton (6)	0–15	AFC Portchester (5)	
118	Shanklin (7)	1–5	AFC Stoneham (6)	
119	Sherborne Town (5)	10–0	Bemerton Heath Harlequins (7)	71
120	Hereford (7)	4–0	Longlevens (7)	
121	Hereford Pegasus (6)	3–3 (3–5 p)	Bitton (6)	75
122	Royal Wootton Bassett Town (6)	2–2 (5–4 p)	Ilminster Town (5)	83
123	Gloucester City (6)	7–0	Stockwood Wanderers (6)	
124	Frome Town (7)	0–1	Bishops Cleeve (7)	
125	St Vallier (6)	2–3	Bishops Lydeard (5)	
126	Downend Flyers (6)	3–1	Cheltenham Civil Service (7)	
127	Frampton Rangers (5)	1–6	Forest Green Rovers (5)	70
128	AEK Boco (5)	2–0	Weston Super Mare (6)	
129	Yeovil Town (6)	1–1 (4–3 p)	Pucklechurch Sports (5)	
130	Stoke Gabriel & Torbay Police (7)	0–4	Bradworthy (7)	64
131	Saltash United (6)	5–1	Teignmouth (7)	
132	Appledore (7)	2–2 (2–4 p)	St Agnes (7)	
133	Marine Academy Plymouth (5)	6–0	Feniton (6)	
134	AFC St Austell (5)	6–2	Helston Athletic (6)	
135	Saltash Borough (7)	5–0	Redruth United (7)	
136	Torquay United (5)	5–2	Plympton (6)	

== Third round qualifying ==
The 92 matches of third round qualifying were played on 13 October 2024. This round included the introduction of 48 teams from the fourth-tier FA Women's National League Division One.

Tie	Home team (tier)	Score	Away team (tier)	Att.
1	Oughtibridge War Memorial (6)	2–3	Sheffield (5)	
2	Huddersfield Town (4)	H–W	Barnsley (4)	
Barnsley F.C. withdrew.
3	Accrington Stanley (6)	5–2	Macclesfield (6)	
4	Leeds Modernians (6)	3–5	Norton & Stockton Ancients (4)	
5	Brunsmeer Athletic (6)	2–3	Handsworth (6)	89
6	Preston North End (6)	5–0	Hartlepool Pools Youth (6)	
7	AFC Fylde (4)	7–1	Darlington (7)	
8	Washington (6)	3–2	MSB Woolton (6)	228
9	Rotherham United (5)	1–1 (2–4 p)	Thornaby (6)	200
10	Spennymoor Town (5)	4–0	SJR Worksop (5)	
11	South Shields (5)	3–1	FC United of Manchester (5)	
12	Chorley (4)	2–3	Stockport County (4)	125
13	Curzon Ashton (5)	5–0	Sunderland West End (5)	
14	Darwen (5)	1–2	Middlesbrough (4)	88
15	West Didsbury & Chorlton (5)	1–2	Rossington Main (7)	
16	Alnwick Town (5)	1–1 (2–4 p)	Durham Cestria (4)	
17	Cheadle Town Stingers (4)	7–0	Consett (6)	52
18	Chesterfield Ladies (5)	1–2	Bradford City (5)	161
19	Hull United (5)	0–4	Doncaster Rovers Belles (4)	
20	Penrith (6)	2–2 (4-2 p)	Tranmere Rovers (5)	
21	York City (4)	5–2	Fleetwood Town Wrens (5)	
22	Mancunian Unity (5)	3–1	Leeds United (4)	
23	Wythenshawe (5)	7–0	Barnsley Women's (4)	
24	Ossett United (6)	1–2	Chester-Le-Street Town (5)	138
25	FC St Helens (6)	1–0	Chester (6)	
26	Peterborough United (4)	5–0	Burton Albion (5)	175
27	Asfordby Amateurs (6)	1–1 (4–2 p)	Walsall (6)	
28	Hednesford Town (6)	2–0	Anstey Nomads (5)	
29	Crewe Alexandra (5)	1–2	Notts County (4)	
30	Kidderminster Harriers (5)	4–0	Redditch United (6)	
31	Worcester City (4)	2–0	Redditch Borough (6)	
32	Dunton & Broughton United (6)	1–4	Port Vale (5)	
33	Leicester City Ladies (6)	2–3	Lincoln City (4)	156
34	Nantwich Town (7)	3–2	Solihull Moors (4)	
35	Leafield Athletic (4)	3–0	Lye Town (5)	
36	Shifnal Town (5)	0–4	Northampton Town (4)	
37	AFC Telford United (6)	3–2	Ilkeston Town (5)	112
38	Alvechurch (5)	0–4	Sutton Coldfield Town (4)	
39	Sleaford Town (6)	0–7	Knowle (5)	
40	Stamford (5)	4–0	Long Eaton United (6)	
41	Long Itchington (6)	5–1	Beaumont Park (6)	
42	Shrewsbury Town (5)	3–2	Lincoln United (4)	100
43	Loughborough Lightning (4)	5–0	Wellingborough Town (6)	
44	Leek Town (5)	0–3	River City (6)	65
45	Boldmere St Michaels (4)	3–0	Hereford (7)	
46	Hutton (6)	3–1	Leyton Orient (7)	

Tie	Home team (tier)	Score	Away team (tier)	Att.
47	Hertford Town (6)	2–3	Hackney (6)	
48	London Seaward (4)	5–0	Stanway Pegasus (6)	
49	AFC Sudbury (4)	4–1	Watford Development (5)	
50	Cambridge United (4)	3–1	Real Bedford (4)	117
51	Barking (5)	1–2	Stevenage (5)	
52	Wroxham (5)	7–0	Long Stratton (7)	120
53	Wormley Rovers (6)	1–1 (1–4 p)	Cambridge City (5)	
54	Dussindale & Hellesdon (5)	3–4	Newport Pagnell Town (6)	
55	Bowers & Pitsea (5)	7–0	Costessey Sports (7)	
56	Luton Town (5)	2–0	St Albans City (5)	
57	Norwich City (4)	5–0	Needham Market (5)	305
58	Royston Town (5)	6–0	Bungay Town (7)	144
59	Dorking Wanderers (5)	2–1	Ashford Town (Middx) (4)	
60	Ascot United (5)	8–2	Woodley United (5)	90
61	Penn & Tylers Green (6)	2–0	Ashford United (5)	
62	Steyning Town Community (6)	0–6	London Bees (4)	
63	Actonians (4)	2–0	Dartford (5)	
64	Farnham Town (7)	5–3	Havant & Waterlooville (6)	221
65	Selsey (5)	0–4	South London (7)	65
66	Chatham Town (4)	12–0	Horsham (7)	
67	Richmond & Kew (6)	0–0 (2–3 p)	Reading (5)	173
68	Abingdon United (4)	1–8	Worthing (4)	50
69	Ebbsfleet United (5)	1–2	Saltdean United (5)	
70	Brentford (6)	2–0	Sport London e Benfica (5)	289
71	Chesham United (4)	5–2	Montpelier Villa (6)	85
72	Fulham (5)	1–1 (4–2 p)	Maidenhead United (4)	
73	Wycombe Wanderers (5)	3–3 (1–3 p)	Comets (7)	183
74	Herne Bay (6)	1–2	Queens Park Rangers (4)	
75	Camden & Islington United (7)	0–8	Aylesford (6)	
76	Fleet Town (6)	0–7	Dulwich Hamlet (4)	301
77	Portishead Town (4)	1–5	AFC Portchester (5)	
78	Forest Green Rovers (5)	2–4	Bridgwater United (4)	
79	AFC St Austell (5)	2–8	Sherborne Town (5)	
80	AFC Stoneham (6)	1–10	Swindon Town (4)	
81	Bournemouth Sports (4)	2–0	Bradworthy (7)	
82	St Agnes (7)	1–7	Saltash United (6)	
83	Gloucester City (6)	1–3	Marine Academy Plymouth (5)	119
84	Bursledon (6)	1–0	Downend Flyers (6)	
85	Bitton (6)	0–3	Winchester City Flyers (5)	98
86	Yeovil Town (6)	1–1 (4–2 p)	Southampton Women's (4)	
87	Sholing (5)	1–2	Bristol Rovers (4)	170
88	Poole Town (5)	4–0	Bishops Cleeve (7)	51
89	AEK Boco (5)	1–8	Keynsham Town (4)	
90	Moneyfields (4)	14–0	Saltash Borough (7)	52
91	AFC Bournemouth (4)	5–3	Bishops Lydeard (5)	
92	Torquay United (5)	3–1	Royal Wootton Bassett Town (6)	

== First round proper ==
The 58 matches in the first round proper were played on 3 November 2024. This round included the introduction of 24 teams from the third-tier FA Women's National League Premier Division.

Number of teams per tier still in competition
Super League (Note: Women's Super League teams joined the competition in the fourth round.)	Championship (Note: Women's Championship teams joined the competition in the third round.)	Premier Division	Division One (Note: 48 Division One teams joined in the third round qualifying with 36 teams qualifying for the competition.)	Regional & County	Total
12 / 12	11 / 11	24 / 24	36 / 36	58 / 58	141 / 141

3 November 2024	Cheadle Town Stingers (4)	2–0	AFC Fylde (4)	Cheadle
14:00	Porteous-Williams 64', 81'	Report		Stadium: Park Road Stadium; Attendance: 110

3 November 2024	FC St Helens (6)	2–1	Doncaster Rovers Belles (4)	St Helens
13:00	Griffiths 58'; Muirhead 82' (pen.)	Report	Farrow 74'	Stadium: Windleshaw Sports

3 November 2024	Washington (6)	0–7	Hull City (3)	Washington
14:00		Report	Tanser 13', 55', 77' (pen.); Lynskey 20'; Ackroyd 28', 60'; Brookes 65'	Stadium: Northern Playing Fields

3 November 2024	Handsworth (6)	2–0	York City (4)	Sheffield
14:00	Hollis-Bland 37'; Jepson 39'	Report		Stadium: Olivers Mount

3 November 2024	Burnley (3)	12–0	Spennymoor Town (5)	Leyland
14:00	Elford 14', 54', 69', 75'; Wilkes 16'; Kelly 42', 58', 64', 72', 82'; Grey 79', 85'	Report		Stadium: County Ground

3 November 2024	Thornaby (6)	2–7	Liverpool Feds (3)	Thornaby
14:00	McEwan 1'; Swash 23'	Report	Johnson 25'; Donoghue 32' (pen.), 56'; Smith 38'; Collins 55'; Deering 90+6'; Cole 90+8' (pen.)	Stadium: Teesdale Park

3 November 2024	Durham Cestria (4)	4–0	Norton & Stockton Ancients (4)	Durham
14:00	Clarke 4'; Gears 20'; Nicholson 22', 37'	Report		Stadium: Maiden Castle sports centre Attendance: 96

3 November 2024	Preston North End (6)	1–2	Bradford City (5)	Longridge
14:00	Tunstall 34'	Report	Markey 18'; 27'	Stadium: Recycling Lives Ground

3 November 2024	Huddersfield Town (4)	7–0	Nantwich Town (7)	Huddersfield
13:00	Beresford 14'; Stuart 23', 86'; Housley 56', 57'; Tiripke 59'; Mallin 90+4'	Report		Stadium: The Stafflex Arena; Attendance: 98

3 November 2024	Curzon Ashton (5)	0–1	Chester-Le-Street Town (5)	Ashton-under-Lyne
14:00		Report	Gray 24'	Stadium: Tameside Stadium; Attendance: 94

3 November 2024	Rossington Main (7)	0–1	Accrington Stanley (6)	Rossington
13:00		Report	Jones 2'	Stadium: Oxford Street

3 November 2024	Wythenshawe (5)	0–3	Middlesbrough (4)	Wythenshawe
13:00		Report	Robson 34'; Turnbull 60', 78'	Stadium: Selco Builders Warehouse Community Stadium

3 November 2024	Sheffield (5)	2–1	Penrith (6)	Dronfield
14:00	Cook 24'; Nelson 34'	Report	Wharton 15'	Stadium: Home of Football Ground

3 November 2024	Mancunian Unity (5)	6–2	Stockport County (4)	Limeside
13:45	Shaw 7', 16'; Melicio 30' (pen.); Jardine 45', 45+3'; Gordon 55'	Report	Brady 59'; Owen 65'	Stadium: Whitebank Stadium

3 November 2024	South Shields (5)	3–3 (4–3 p)	Halifax (3)	South Shields
14:00	Townsend 25', 67'; White 89'	Report	Cardenas 34'; Witham 77'; Fisher 80'	Stadium: Mariners Park
	Penalties
	Gatens (penalty scored)		Penalty scored Penalty missed

3 November 2024	Stamford (5)	2–3	Worcester City (4)	Stamford
13:00	Marson 18'; Fox 44'	Report	Mitcham 37'; Highway 57', 87'	Stadium: Zeeco Stadium

3 November 2024	Loughborough Lightning (4)	2–1	Sutton Coldfield Town (4)	Loughborough
13:00	Wright 49'; Arber 85'	Report	Deasy 47'	Stadium: Loughborough University Stadium

3 November 2024	Notts County (4)	0–5	Sporting Khalsa (3)	Eastwood
14:00		Report	Kennerley 23'; Sparkes 25'; Brett 52'; Winters 63'; Davies 87'	Stadium: Coronation Park

3 November 2024	Boldmere St Michaels (4)	1–3	Nottingham Forest (3)	Boldmere
15:00	Bojang 60'	Report	Johnson 20', 65'; Wellings 44'	Stadium: Boldmere Community Stadium

3 November 2024	Asfordby Amateurs (6)	1–7	Wolverhampton Wanderers (3)	Asfordby
13:00	Poyzer 35'	Report	George 8', 36', 51'; Quigley 20', 63'; Merrick 39'; Loydon 90'	Stadium: Holwell Sports Club

3 November 2024	Kidderminster Harriers (5)	3–1	Port Vale (5)	Kidderminster
14:00	Rogers 17'; Harris 40' (pen.); Gallagher 46'	Report	Jackson 73' (pen.)	Stadium: Aggborough Stadium

3 November 2024	Shrewsbury Town (5)	3–2	Northampton Town (4)	Shrewsbury
14:00	Doster 43'; Owen 71'; Wilson 79'	Report	Farrow 58'; Footitt 90+5'	Stadium: New Meadow

3 November 2024	Knowle (5)	1–7	West Bromwich Albion (3)	Knowle
13:00	Gibson 48' (pen.)	Report	Warner 4'; Oakley 33', 59'; Mahmood 40', 41'; Jhamat 42'; May 80' (pen.)	Stadium: Robins' Nest; Attendance: 273

3 November 2024	AFC Telford United (6)	1–5	Stourbridge (3)	Wellington
14:00	Woodhouse 8'	Report	Clements 20'; Axten 21', 62'; Fantom 34'; Embley 78'	Stadium: New Bucks Head; Attendance: 87

3 November 2024	River City (6)	2–3	Long Itchington (6)	Braunstone Town
14:00	Goal	Report	Goal	Stadium: Riverside Football Ground

3 November 2024	Stoke City (3)	5–0	Hednesford Town (6)	Stone
13:00	Ravening 15', 38'; Priestley 26', 59'; Stamps 52'	Report		Stadium: Wellbeing Park

3 November 2024	Derby County (3)	1–3	Leafield Athletic (4)	Mickleover
13:00	Jenkins 15'	Report	Gallop 6'; Lowe 62'; Hemans 84'	Stadium: Don Amott Arena

3 November 2024	Rugby Borough (3)	7–0	Lincoln City (4)	Rugby
14:00	Potts 27'; Nixon 46', 49', 52', 67'; Mosby 58'; Moncaster 90'	Report		Stadium: Kilsby Lane

3 November 2024	Peterborough United (4)	2–2 (4–2 p)	Billericay Town (3)	Bourne
13:00	Connor 68'; Reynolds 90+3'	Report	Smith 46'; Biggs 74'	Stadium: Abbey Lawn; Attendance: 185
	Penalties
	Bennett (penalty scored); Reynolds (penalty scored); Driscoll-King (penalty scored); Wilshaw (penalty missed); Dawbarn (penalty scored)		(penalty scored) Jackson; (penalty missed) Biggs; (penalty scored) Horwood; (penalty missed) Evans

3 November 2024	London Seaward (4)	3–1	Hackney (6)	Barkingside
14:00	Awan; Long; Malcolm	Report	Goal	Stadium: Oakside Stadium; Attendance: 62

3 November 2024	Cambridge City (5)	2–2 (2–4 p)	Stevenage (5)	Haverhill
13:00	Barrett 5', 73' (pen.)	Report	Edge 49'; Makewell 89'	Stadium: The New Croft; Attendance: 228
	Penalties
	Penalty scored Penalty missed		(penalty scored) Makewell; (penalty scored) Croucher; (penalty scored) Thomas-O'Keefe; (penalty scored) Gunn

3 November 2024	AFC Sudbury (4)	3–0	Bowers & Pitsea (5)	Sudbury
14:00	Frazzoni 29'; Allen 45+1'; Drake 84' (pen.)	Report		Stadium: The Mel Group Stadium

3 November 2024	Hashtag United (3)	6–0	Wroxham (5)	Aveley
15:00	Norton 1'; Turner 58', 64'; Finlayson 66'; Ali 73'; Gillard 90' (pen.)	Report		Stadium: Parkside Stadium

3 November 2024	Ipswich Town (3)	12–0	MK Dons (3)	Felixstowe
13:00	Thomas 1', 17', 48', 78', 81'; Addison 19' (pen.), 21' (pen.); Mitchell 27'; Peskett 32'; Guyatt 42', 46'; Robertson 50'	Report		Stadium: The Martello Ground; Attendance: 620

3 November 2024	Royston Town (5)	3–0	Newport Pagnell Town (6)	Royston
14:00	Mayes 46'; Reed 59'; Sillitoe 90+6'	Report		Stadium: Garden Walk; Attendance: 253

3 November 2024	Cambridge United (4)	0–1	Norwich City (4)	St Neots
13:00		Report	Flye 15'	Stadium: Rowley Park

3 November 2024	Hutton (6)	2–4	Luton Town (5)	Billericay
14:30	Canny 3', 14'	Report	Wade 22'; Leighton 59'; Fensome 68'; Todd 89'	Stadium: Hannakins Farm Community Centre

3 November 2024	Penn & Tylers Green (6)	0–3	Queens Park Rangers (4)	Penn
13:00		Report	Ward-Chambers 8'; Dzyadyk 41'; Kennedy 45'	Stadium: French School Meadow; Attendance: 225

3 November 2024	Oxford United (3)	5–0	Actonians (4)	Marston
13:00	Legg 15'; King 24'; Poole 39'; Trinder 61', 88'	Report		Stadium: Court Place Farm; Attendance: 222

3 November 2024	Comets (7)	2–5	Worthing (4)	Rotherhithe
14:00	45'; 88'	Report	Cooper 5'; Lane 16', 34'; Tibble 20'; Davies 90+5'	Stadium: St Pauls Sports Ground

3 November 2024	AFC Wimbledon (3)	0–0 (2–4 p)	Watford (3)	Wimbledon
14:00		Report		Stadium: Plough Lane; Attendance: 494
	Penalties
	Donovan (penalty missed); Bell (penalty missed); Mackenzie (penalty scored); Clifford (penalty scored)		(penalty scored) Davison; (penalty scored) Haines; (penalty scored) Filbey; (penalty scored) Gale

3 November 2024	Lewes (3)	1–1 (6–5 p)	Dulwich Hamlet (4)	Lewes
14:00	Carpenter 81'	Report	Leitch 53'	Stadium: The Dripping Pan; Attendance: 531
	Penalties
	Schreimaier (penalty scored)		Penalty scored Penalty missed

3 November 2024	Fulham (5)	7–0	Chesham United (4)	New Malden
14:30	Olds 11'; Gandee Morgan 17'; Mendes 24' (pen.); Heasman 28', 55'; Parsonson 65'; Taylor-Makepeace 90+1'	Report		Stadium: Motspur Park

3 November 2024	Aylesford (6)	3–1	Reading (5)	Aylesford
15:30	Richardson 27'; Keyte 45+1'; Witham 77' (pen.)	Report	Hoesli-Atkins 33' (pen.)	Stadium: Aylesford Recreation Ground

3 November 2024	Chatham Town (4)	5–2	Dorking Wanderers (5)	Chatham
14:30	Woodgate 27', 45+1', 90' (pen.); 52' (o.g.); Perkins 65'	Report	Childerhouse 47'; Clapinson 72'	Stadium: Bauvil Stadium; Attendance: 179

3 November 2024	Farnham Town (7)	0–2	London Bees (4)	Farnham
13:00		Report	Isherwood 90+1', 90+5'	Stadium: The Memorial Ground; Attendance: 237

3 November 2024	Saltdean United (5)	2–1	South London (7)	Saltdean
14:00	Bridges 31'; Barton 39'	Report	Todd 12'	Stadium: Hill Park; Attendance: 84

3 November 2024	Brentford (6)	4–2	Ascot United (5)	Bedfont
15:00	Cheatley 31', 41'; Logie 47', 90+2'	Report	Robertson 50'; Glover 51'	Stadium: Bedfont Sports Club; Attendance: 502

3 November 2024	Torquay United (5)	0–1	Bridgwater United (4)	Newton Abbot
14:00		Report	Pengelly 70' (pen.)	Stadium: Recreation Ground

3 November 2024	Cheltenham Town (3)	7–0	Yeovil Town (6)	Bishop's Cleeve
14:00	Hateley 24'; 26' (o.g.); Lue 45+3'; Trinci 70'; Bell 79'; Leach 85'; Owen 87'	Report		Stadium: Kayte Lane Stadium

3 November 2024	Bristol Rovers (4)	4–3	Sherborne Town (5)	Bristol
14:00	16' (o.g.); Ackerman 32'; Jarvis 45+1'; Wannell 90'	Report	72'; 80'; 90+3'	Stadium: Memorial Stadium

3 November 2024	Plymouth Argyle (3)	6–0	Poole Town (5)	Plymouth
13:00	Whitmore 7'; (o.g.); Orchard 63', 90+3'; Smith 69'; Crawford 82'	Report		Stadium: Home Park; Attendance: 168

3 November 2024	Saltash United (6)	0–6	AFC Bournemouth (4)	Saltash
13:00		Report	Barron-Clark 23'; Bloomfield 41' (pen.), 59'; Treweek 61'; James 84'; Buckingham 89'	Stadium: Kimberley Stadium

3 November 2024	Bournemouth Sports (4)	0–1	Moneyfields (4)	Bournemouth
13:00		Report	Albuery 80'	Stadium: Chapel Gate

3 November 2024	Winchester City Flyers (5)	1–4	AFC Portchester (5)	Winchester
14:00	Wilkinson 4'	Report	Jennings 9'; Hillier 16', 59'; Currie 69'	Stadium: Charters Community Stadium

3 November 2024	Bursledon (6)	0–4	Marine Academy Plymouth (5)	Chandler's Ford
14:00		Report	Woodward 8'; Overton 20', 86'; Morison 29'	Stadium: Toynbee School

3 November 2024	Gwalia United (3)	4–1	Swindon Town (4)	Newport
14:00	Sargent 8'; Williams-Mills 20' (pen.); Gregson 21', 59'	Report	St Clara 13'	Stadium: Newport Stadium; Attendance: 195

3 November 2024	Exeter City (3)	4–0	Keynsham Town (4)	Exeter
13:00	Gillies 28'; Stacey 29', 39'; Pollock 72'	Report		Stadium: Exwick Sports Hub; Attendance: 185

== Second round proper ==
The 29 matches in the second round proper were scheduled to be played on 24 November 2024. Rearranged fixtures were played in the following week.

Number of teams per tier still in competition
Super League (Note: Women's Super League teams joined the competition in the fourth round.)	Championship (Note: Women's Championship teams joined the competition in the third round.)	Premier Division	Division One	Regional & County	Total
12 / 12	11 / 11	19 / 24	19 / 36	22 / 58	83 / 141

24 November 2024	Accrington Stanley (6)	1–2	Huddersfield Town (4)	Galgate
13:00	Corrigan 74'	Report	Stuart 18', 60'	Stadium: Galgate Recreational Field

24 November 2024	Durham Cestria (4)	1–1 (3–4 p)	Chester-Le-Street Town (5)	Durham
14:00	Clarke 25'	Report	Ashton 32'	Stadium: Maiden Castle sports centre
	Penalties
	Penalty scored Penalty missed		Penalty scored Penalty missed

24 November 2024	Mancunian Unity (5)	4–0	Handsworth (6)	Limeside
13:45	Jardine 45+5', 67'; Ince 45+7'; Siddle 90'	Report		Stadium: Whitebank Stadium

24 November 2024	South Shields (5)	0–11	Liverpool Feds (3)	South Shields
14:00		Report	Deering 47'; Francis 52'; Collins 54'; Kinvig 63'; Willis 65', 76'; Johnson 73'; Anderson 82', 84', 90+3'; Boydell 90+1'	Stadium: Mariners Park; Attendance: 333

24 November 2024	Wolverhampton Wanderers (3)	8–1	Sporting Khalsa (3)	Wellington
14:00	Hughes 11', 38'; Toussaint 34', 53'; Greengrass 45'; Merrick 48'; Cross 60'; Denham 61'	Report	Smith 73' (pen.)	Stadium: New Bucks Head

24 November 2024	Norwich City (4)	1–0	Leafield Athletic (4)	Horsford
13:00	Strauss 15' (pen.)	Report		Stadium: The Nest

24 November 2024	Rugby Borough (3)	7–1	Peterborough United (4)	Rugby
14:00	Mosby 5', 20', 60'; Moncaster 23', 33'; Potts 70'; Camwell 77'	Report	Bale 90+2'	Stadium: Kilsby Lane

24 November 2024	Shrewsbury Town (5)	3–3 (4–2 p)	Sheffield (5)	Shrewsbury
14:00	Stanley 12', 47'; Bebbington 64'		Cook 46'; Essa 52'; Hallas-Potts 90+1'	Stadium: New Meadow
	Penalties
	Robinson (penalty scored); Stanley (penalty missed); Arnold (penalty scored); Jones (penalty scored); Carr (penalty scored)		Penalty missed Penalty scored

24 November 2024	West Bromwich Albion (3)	6–0	Worcester City (4)	Redditch
13:00	Rhodes 5'; Oakley 11', 62', 76'; Jhamat 32'; Haughey 39'	Report		Stadium: Valley Stadium

24 November 2024	Brentford (6)	1–0	London Seaward (4)	Bedfont
15:00	Woods 85'	Report		Stadium: Bedfont Sports Club; Attendance: 401

24 November 2024	Hashtag United (3)	2–2 (1–4 p)	Ipswich Town (3)	Aveley
15:00	Fronc 5'; Turner 73'	Report	Barker 38'; Peskett 90+5'	Stadium: Parkside Stadium
	Penalties
	(penalty missed) (penalty missed); Ayisi (penalty scored)		Bryant (penalty scored); Fisher (penalty scored) (penalty scored); O'Brien (penalty scored)

24 November 2024	Oxford United (3)	1–0	Watford (3)	Marston
13:00	Budaieva 70'	Report		Stadium: Court Place Farm; Attendance: 132

24 November 2024	Aylesford (6)	2–2 (3–5 p)	Worthing (4)	Aylesford
15:30	Hulme 50'; Healy 90+1'	Report	Linscer 51'; Humphrey 63' (pen.)	Stadium: Aylesford Recreation Ground
	Penalties
	Penfold (penalty scored); Witham (penalty missed); Armstrong (penalty scored); Healy (penalty scored)		Winchester (penalty scored); Humphrey (penalty scored); Young (penalty scored); Rowe (penalty scored); Bell (penalty scored)

24 November 2024	London Bees (4)	3–2	Chatham Town (4)	Edgware
13:00	Campbell 10'; Tambula 45'; Hoteit 61'	Report	Sharp 5'; Woodgate 30'	Stadium: The Hive Stadium

24 November 2024	Fulham (5)	4–3	Royston Town (5)	New Malden
14:30	Mendes 45'; Tagliavini 56'; Newman 75'; Olds 89'	Report	9' (o.g.); Mills 40'; Essa 51'	Stadium: Motspur Park

24 November 2024	Lewes (3)	3–0	AFC Sudbury (4)	Lewes
14:00	Roche 2'; Carpenter 34'; Eze 64'	Report		Stadium: The Dripping Pan

24 November 2024	Plymouth Argyle (3)	1–5	Exeter City (3)	Plymouth
13:00	Whitmore 90+3'	Report	Taylor 39'; Gillies 51'; Stacey 58', 76'; Barbour-Gresham 81'	Stadium: Home Park; Attendance: 904

24 November 2024	Cheltenham Town (3)	2–1	Moneyfields (4)	Bishop's Cleeve
14:00	Llewellyn 79'; Lue 88'	Report	Wilson-Wilton 49'	Stadium: Kayte Lane Stadium

24 November 2024	Marine Academy Plymouth (5)	0–4 or 0–5 (Note: The FA reported the result of Marine Academy Plymouth v Bristol Rovers as 0–4, but both clubs reported the result as 0–5)	Bristol Rovers (4)	Plymouth
14:30		Report	Jarvis 3', 20', 89', 90+1'	Stadium: Manadon Sports Hub

24 November 2024	Gwalia United (3)	4–0	Bridgwater United (4)	Newport
14:00	Williams-Mills 30', 45+2', 56'; Taylor 90+2'	Report		Stadium: Newport Stadium; Attendance: 224

24 November 2024	AFC Portchester (5)	0–4	AFC Bournemouth (4)	Fareham
13:00		Report	Barron-Clark 8'; Gilroy 46'; McGuinness 47', 57'	Stadium: The OnSite Group Stadium

27 November 2024	Kidderminster Harriers (5)	1–1 (4–2 p)	Stourbridge (3)	Kidderminster
19:30	Harris 28'	Report	Joyce 76'	Stadium: Aggborough Stadium
	Penalties
	Penalty scored Penalty missed		Penalty missed Penalty scored

1 December 2024	Long Itchington (6)	0–19	Nottingham Forest (3)	Kenilworth
13:00			Galloway 3', 18', 22', 54', 56'; Thomas 5', 11', 27', 50', 52'; Domingo 9', 74'; Wellings 15', 80', 85'; Sims 17'; Green 25'; Manders 47'; Olding 90'	Stadium: Kenilworth Sporting Ground

1 December 2024	Queens Park Rangers (4)	5–0	Saltdean United (5)	Hayes
13:00	Stanley 39', 50', 82'; Dzyadyk 41'; Ward-Chambers 78'	Report		Stadium: Skyex Community Stadium

1 December 2024	FC St Helens (6)	0–4	Cheadle Town Stingers (4)	St Helens
13:00			Ahmed 18'; Dunlop 48', 57', 76'	Stadium: Windleshaw Sports

1 December 2024	Burnley (3)	11–0	Bradford City (5)	Burnley
14:00	Logan 4', 84'; Elford 10', 18', 34', 41', 70'; Reidford 24'; Kelly 44'; Blades 45+2'; Walker 72'			Stadium: Turf Moor

1 December 2024	Hull City (3)	0–0 (4–5 p)	Middlesbrough (4)	Barton
14:00				Stadium: Easy Buy Stadium
	Penalties
	Tanser (penalty missed); Hunt (penalty scored); Ackroyd (penalty scored); Bott (penalty scored); Harness (penalty scored) (penalty missed)		Wilkinson (penalty missed); Bell (penalty scored); Robson (penalty scored); Ferguson (penalty scored); Turnbull (penalty scored); Maxwell (penalty scored)

1 December 2024	Stevenage (5)	1–1 (14–15 p)	Luton Town (5)	Letchworth
14:30	Croucher 5'		Leighton 17'	Stadium: Hertfordshire FA; Attendance: 150
	Penalties
	Makewell (penalty scored); Croucher (penalty scored); Thomas-O'Keefe (penalty scored); Gunn (penalty scored); Nebbitt (penalty scored); Millen (penalty scored); Edge (penalty scored); Bodily (penalty scored); Webster (penalty scored); Fox-Barker (penalty scored); Reeves (penalty missed); Makewell (penalty scored); Croucher (penalty scored); Thomas-O'Keefe (penalty scored); Gunn (penalty scored); Nebbitt (penalty missed)		Fensome (penalty scored); McKay (penalty scored); Maddix (penalty scored); Lewis (penalty scored); Swarres (penalty scored); Mulvaney (penalty scored); Spillman (penalty scored); Wade (penalty scored); Buttigieg (penalty scored); Hudson (penalty scored); Blacksley (penalty missed); Fensome (penalty scored); McKay (penalty scored); Maddix (penalty scored); Lewis (penalty scored); Swarres (penalty scored)

5 December 2024	Loughborough Lightning (4)	2–4	Stoke City (3)	Loughborough
19:30	Delglyn 13'; Rodgers 76'		Cole 5'; Stamps 18'; Suttie 24'; Priestley 38'	Stadium: Holywell Park

== Third round proper ==
The 20 matches in the third round proper were scheduled to be held on 8 December 2024, and included the introduction of 11 teams from the second-tier Women's Championship. Three rearranged fixtures were played the following week and one played on 8 January 2025. 6th tier Brentford were the lowest club remaining in the third round.

Number of teams per tier still in competition
Super League (Note: Women's Super League teams joined the competition in the fourth round.)	Championship	Premier Division	Division One	Regional & County	Total
12 / 12	11 / 11	13 / 24	9 / 36	9 / 58	54 / 141

8 December 2024	Chester-Le-Street Town (5)	1–2	Stoke City (3)	Chester-le-Street
13:00	Ashton 89'		Ravening 2' (pen.), 61'	Stadium: Moor Park

8 December 2024	Wolverhampton Wanderers (3)	14–0	Shrewsbury Town (5)	Telford
14:00	Toussaint 6'; Cross 15', 73'; Anderson 19'; Greengrass 20', 22', 47', 53', 68'; George 45+1'; Merrick 45+2', 56'; Morphet 70'; Denham 75'			Stadium: New Bucks Head; Attendance: 568

8 December 2024	Liverpool Feds (3)	0–2	Sheffield United (2)	Liverpool
14:00			Farrugia 28', 63'	Stadium: Jericho Lane; Attendance: 238

8 December 2024	Newcastle United (2)	2–0	Middlesbrough (4)	Newcastle
13:00	Greenwood 42', 84'			Stadium: Kingston Park Stadium; Attendance: 1,428

8 December 2024	West Bromwich Albion (3)	2–0	Cheadle Town Stingers (4)	Redditch
15:00	Reynolds 31'; Watkins 44'			Stadium: Valley Stadium

8 December 2024	Birmingham City (2)	0–1	Durham (2)	Birmingham
14:00			Ayre 42'	Stadium: St Andrew's; Attendance: 402

8 December 2024	Sunderland (2)	4–0	Huddersfield Town (4)	Hetton-le-Hole
14:00	McInnes 17'; McAteer 32'; Goddard 55'; Dale 87'			Stadium: Eppleton CW; Attendance: 229

8 December 2024	Rugby Borough (3)	3–0	Mancunian Unity (5)	Rugby
14:00	Brown 26'; Barton 72'; Mosby 79' (pen.)			Stadium: Kilsby Lane

8 December 2024	Portsmouth (2)	5–0	Luton Town (5)	Havant
14:00	Rowbotham 5'; Quirk 29', 43', 64'; Freeland 86'			Stadium: Westleigh Park; Attendance: 207

8 December 2024	London City Lionesses (2)	4–0	Gwalia United (3)	Bromley
14:00	Goodwin 27'; Boye-Hlorkah 40'; Shen 79'; Ivanović 90+2'	Report		Stadium: Hayes Lane

8 December 2024	Brentford (6)	1–2	Fulham (5)	Bedfont
15:00	Logie 71'		Olds 48'; Parsonson 73'	Stadium: Bedfont Recreation Ground; Attendance: 719

8 December 2024	Charlton Athletic (2)	4–0	Lewes (3)	Charlton
13:00	Brazil 14', 36'; Pearse 27'; Barton 71'			Stadium: The Valley; Attendance: 347

8 December 2024	Southampton (2)	0–3	Bristol City (2)	Eastleigh
13:00			Powell 29'; Bance 32'; Syme 71'	Stadium: Ten Acres; Attendance: 488

8 December 2024	Cheltenham Town (3)	2–1 (a.e.t.)	Norwich City (4)	Bishop's Cleeve
14:00	Lue 53', 98'		Strauss 59' (pen.)	Stadium: Kayte Lane

8 December 2024	Exeter City (3)	3–1 (a.e.t.)	Worthing (4)	Newton Abbot
14:00	Gillies 70', 118'; Stacey 91'		Humphrey 56'	Stadium: Coach Road

8 December 2024	London Bees (4)	6–3 (a.e.t.)	Queens Park Rangers (4)	Edgware
13:00	Isherwood 1', 77', 99', 112'; Whitelock 104'; Hoare 118'		Ward-Chambers 4'; Goddard 8'; Stanley 96'	Stadium: The Hive; Attendance: 133

15 December 2024	Kidderminster Harriers (5)	0–4	Blackburn Rovers (2)	Stourport
14:00			Goal	Stadium: Walshes Meadow

15 December 2024	Ipswich Town (3)	1–0	AFC Bournemouth (4)	Felixstowe
13:00	Peskett 45+1'			Stadium: Dellwood Avenue; Attendance: 566

15 December 2024	Oxford United (3)	2–3	Bristol Rovers (4)	Marston
13:00	Poole 45+1', 48'		Jarvis 29'; Ackerman 63', 66'	Stadium: The MGroup Stadium; Attendance: 245

8 January 2025	Nottingham Forest (3)	1–0 (a.e.t.)	Burnley (3)	West Bridgford
19:00	Wellings 99'			Stadium: City Ground; Attendance: 884

== Fourth round ==
Matches in the fourth round were scheduled to be played between 11 and 12 January 2025. The draw took place on 9 December 2024. This round included the introduction of 12 teams from the first-tier Women's Super League, and was the final round to introduce new teams. The lowest ranked team left was 5th tier Fulham.

Number of teams per tier still in competition
Super League	Championship	Premier Division	Division One	Regional & County	Total
12 / 12	9 / 11	8 / 24	2 / 36	1 / 58	32 / 141

11 January 2025	Manchester United (1)	7–0	West Bromwich Albion (3)	Leigh
17:15	Malard 23'; Bizet 77', 89', 90+5'; Wiliams 79', 90+1'; Toone 83'	Report		Stadium: Leigh Sports Village; Attendance: 2,313; Referee: Lucy May

12 January 2025	Fulham (5)	0–5	London City Lionesses (2)	Fulham
12:00		Report	Boye-Hlorkah 25', 27', 33'; Asllani 60' (pen.); Goodwin 65'	Stadium: Craven Cottage; Attendance: 2,064; Referee: Hannah Gardner

12 January 2025	Exeter City (3)	1–7	Sunderland (2)	Newton Abbot
13:00	Stacey 38' (pen.)	Report	Jones 4', 40', 49'; Dale 13', 31', 78', 85'	Stadium: Coach Road; Attendance: 588; Referee: Levi Gray

12 January 2025	Manchester City (1)	3–0	Ipswich Town (3)	Manchester
13:00	Roord 20'; Coombs 55'; Miedema 76'	Report		Stadium: Academy Stadium; Attendance: 2,081; Referee: Grace Lowe

12 January 2025	Newcastle United (2)	1–0	Nottingham Forest (3)	Newcastle
13:00	McQuade 76'	Report		Stadium: Kingston Park; Attendance: 1,445; Referee: Abby Dearden

12 January 2025	London Bees (4)	0–6	Rugby Borough (3)	Edgware
14:00		Report	Potts 23'; Wiseman 26'; Moncaster 42'; Nixon 45+1', 84'; Rush 49'	Stadium: The Hive Stadium; Attendance: 251; Referee: Francesca Catchpole

12 January 2025	Cheltenham Town (3)	0–2	Wolverhampton Wanderers (3)	Bishop's Cleeve
14:00		Report	Hughes 62'; Merrick 70'	Stadium: Kayte Lane; Attendance: 582 or 576; Referee: Abigail Freullet

12 January 2025	Chelsea (1)	4–0	Charlton Athletic (2)	Kingston upon Thames
15:00	Ramírez 40'; Reiten 45+3' (pen.); Beever-Jones 48'; Charles 73'	Report		Stadium: Kingsmeadow; Attendance: 2,172; Referee: Joanne Horwood

12 January 2025	Aston Villa (1)	9–0	Bristol Rovers (4)	Walsall
17:45	Daly 3', 8'; Nunes 6', 26', 65'; Tomás 23'; Grant 46'; Hanson 56'; Baijings 80'	Report		Stadium: Bescot Stadium; Attendance: 972; Referee: Adewunmi Soneye

14 January 2025 (Note: Originally scheduled for 12 January, this match was postponed and rescheduled due to a frozen pitch.)	Crystal Palace (1)	6–1	Sheffield United (2)	Sutton
19:00	Sharpe 6'; Weerden 29', 61'; Gejl 52'; Cato 71'; Page 86' (o.g.)	Report	Aherne 74'	Stadium: Gander Green Lane; Attendance: 164; Referee: Ella Broad

15 January 2025 (Note: Originally scheduled for 12 January, this match was postponed and rescheduled due to a frozen pitch.)	Blackburn Rovers (2)	1–3	Portsmouth (2)	Leyland
19:00	Primmer 63'	Report	Jones 50'; Quirk 55'; Barker 67'	Stadium: County Ground; Attendance: 90 or 218; Referee: Magdalena Golba

15 January 2025 (Note: Originally scheduled for 12 January, this match was postponed and rescheduled due to a frozen pitch.)	Leicester City (1)	4–1	Stoke City (3)	Nottingham
19:45	Momiki 13', 76'; Goodwin 29'; Las 90+2'	Report	Ravening 60' (pen.)	Stadium: Meadow Lane; Attendance: 276; Referee: Laura van Lier

29 January 2025 (Note: Originally scheduled for 11 January, this match was postponed and rescheduled due to a frozen pitch.)	Brighton & Hove Albion (1)	4–1	Durham (2)	Lancing
19:00	Vilamala 6'; Agyemang 19' (pen.); Bergsvand 21'; Parris 90+6'	Report	Blake 71'	Stadium: American Express Elite Football Performance Centre; Attendance: 262

29 January 2025 (Note: Originally scheduled for 12 January, this match was postponed and rescheduled due to a frozen pitch.)	Everton (1)	2–0	Tottenham Hotspur (1)	Walton
19:00	Gago 48'; Payne 90+2'	Report		Stadium: Walton Hall Park; Attendance: 607; Referee: Cheryl Foster

29 January 2025 (Note: Originally scheduled for 12 January, this match was postponed and rescheduled due to a frozen pitch.)	Arsenal (1)	5–0	Bristol City (2)	Borehamwood
19:45	Blackstenius 3', 16'; Maanum 8'; Mead 25', 54'	Report		Stadium: Meadow Park; Attendance: 2,808

29 January 2025 (Note: Originally scheduled for 12 January, this match was postponed and rescheduled due to a frozen pitch.)	West Ham United (1)	0–5	Liverpool (1)	Dagenham
19:45		Report	Sáez 3' (o.g.); Kiernan 18'; Fisk 48'; Parry 66'; Kerr 70'	Stadium: Victoria Road; Attendance: 859

== Fifth round ==
Eight matches were played in the fifth round on 8 and 9 February 2025, made up of the 16 winning teams from the fourth round. The draw took place on 13 January 2025. Only two FA Women's National League (3rd tier) clubs remained: Rugby Borough and Wolverhampton Wanderers.

Number of teams per tier still in competition
Super League	Championship	Premier Division	Division One	Regional & County	Total
10 / 12	4 / 11	2 / 24	0 / 36	0 / 58	16 / 141

8 February 2025	Aston Villa (1)	3–2	Brighton & Hove Albion (1)	Walsall
12:00	Patten 45+2'; Daly 50'; Grant 55'	Report	Parris 45', 72'	Stadium: Bescot Stadium; Attendance: 821; Referee: Melissa Burgin

8 February 2025	Wolverhampton Wanderers (3)	0–6	Manchester United (1)	Telford
17:15		Report	Terland 26'; Galton 36'; Mannion 52'; Toone 54'; Griffiths 88', 90+5'	Stadium: New Bucks Head; Attendance: 5,008; Referee: Lucy May

9 February 2025	Rugby Borough (3)	0–2	Liverpool (1)	Rugby
12:30		Report	Höbinger 84'; Enderby 90+2'	Stadium: Kilsby Lane; Attendance: 1,291; Referee: Ella Broad

9 February 2025	Crystal Palace (1)	2–0	Newcastle United (2)	Sutton
13:00	Weerden 81'; Larkin 90+4'	Report		Stadium: Gander Green Lane; Attendance: 478; Referee: Megan Wilson

9 February 2025	Portsmouth (2)	0–2	Sunderland (2)	Havant
14:00		Report	Dear 34'; Scarr 45+1'	Stadium: Westleigh Park; Attendance: 424; Referee: Alice Parker

9 February 2025	Manchester City (1)	3–1	Leicester City (1)	Manchester
14:00	Ouahabi 18'; Kerolin 29'; Shaw 59'	Report	Las 82'	Stadium: Academy Stadium; Attendance: 1,959; Referee: Phoebe Cross

9 February 2025	Arsenal (1)	2–0	London City Lionesses (2)	Borehamwood
14:00	Codina 32'; Blackstenius 81'	Report		Stadium: Meadow Park; Attendance: 2,483; Referee: Abigail Byrne

9 February 2025	Chelsea (1)	4–1	Everton (1)	Kingston upon Thames
15:00	Macario 36' (pen.); Ramírez 45+2'; Hamano 71'; Baltimore 90+2' (pen.)	Report	Holmgaard 17'	Stadium: Kingsmeadow; Attendance: 1,974; Referee: Amy Fearn

== Quarter-finals ==
Four matches were played in the quarter-finals on 8 and 9 March 2025, made up of the eight winning teams from the fifth round. The draw took place on 11 February 2025. The lowest ranked team left was Women's Championship club Sunderland.

Number of teams per tier still in competition
Super League	Championship	Premier Division	Division One	Regional & County	Total
7 / 12	1 / 11	0 / 24	0 / 36	0 / 58	8 / 141

8 March 2025	Manchester United (1)	3–1	Sunderland (2)	Leigh
17:15	Galton 7'; Le Tissier 45+2'; Toone 90+1'	Report	Griffiths 70'	Stadium: Leigh Sports Village; Attendance: 3,051; Referee: Stacey Fullicks

9 March 2025	Manchester City (1)	2–0	Aston Villa (1)	Manchester
12:30	Shaw 53'; Park 72'	Report		Stadium: Academy Stadium; Attendance: 2,086; Referee: Abigail Byrne

9 March 2025	Chelsea (1)	1–0	Crystal Palace (1)	Kingston upon Thames
14:30	James 64'	Report		Stadium: Kingsmeadow; Attendance: 2,266; Referee: Amy Fearn

9 March 2025	Arsenal (1)	0–1	Liverpool (1)	Borehamwood
14:30		Report	Van Domselaar 78' (o.g.)	Stadium: Meadow Park; Attendance: 3,148; Referee: Stacey Pearson

== Semi-finals ==
Two matches were played in the semi-finals on 12 and 13 April 2025, made up of the four winning teams from the quarter-finals. The draw took place on 9 March 2025.

Number of teams per tier still in competition
Super League	Championship	Premier Division	Division One	Regional & County	Total
4 / 12	0 / 11	0 / 24	0 / 36	0 / 58	4 / 141

12 April 2025	Chelsea (1)	2–1	Liverpool (1)	Kingston-upon-Thames
12:15	Cuthbert 45+2'; Beever-Jones 90+4'	Report	Smith 21'	Stadium: Kingsmeadow; Attendance: 2,886; Referee: Kirsty Dowle

13 April 2025	Manchester City (1)	0–2	Manchester United (1)	Manchester
15:00		Report	Bizet 6'; Clinton 22'	Stadium: Academy Stadium; Attendance: 5,600; Referee: Stacey Pearson

== Final ==
The final was played at Wembley Stadium on 18 May 2025. Chelsea defeated Manchester United 3–0 to win their sixth title.

18 May 2025
13:30 BST

Chelsea	3–0	Manchester United
Baltimore 45' (pen.), 90+1'; Macario 84'	Report

Wembley Stadium, London
Attendance: 74,412
Referee: Stacey Fullicks (Northamptonshire)

== Television rights ==
Round	Date	Teams	Kick-off	Channels	
Round	Date	Teams	Kick-off	Digital	TV
Fifth round	9 February	Rugby Borough v Liverpool	12:30	BBC iPlayer	BBC Red Button
Quarter-finals	9 March	Manchester City v Aston Villa	12:30	BBC iPlayer	BBC One
Semi-finals	12 April	Chelsea v Liverpool	12:15	BBC iPlayer	BBC One
Semi-finals	13 April	Manchester City v Manchester United	15:00	BBC iPlayer	BBC Two
Final	18 May	Chelsea v Manchester United	13:30	BBC iPlayer	BBC One

== See also ==
- 2024–25 Women's League Cup
