= Elmo Hood =

British contemporary artist

Elliot Nicholas Hood (born 1989), known as Elmo Hood, is a British contemporary artist. He works in abstraction, pop art and collage.

== Early life and education ==
Elliot Nicholas Hood was born in Southampton, Hampshire, England in 1989. Living in Chandler’s Ford he attended Thornden School and Barton Peveril Sixth Form College. Hood’s grades qualified him for a sports scholarship at Bath University where he took a Sports Performance foundation degree with hopes of becoming a professional basketball player.

== Career ==
Following a sports injury and family bereavement in 2011, Hood turned to painting as a coping mechanism. Art had been his favourite subject at secondary school where he also studied ceramics and though not seeing a career in art at first, following his move to London he took it more seriously. In 2013, he was commissioned to paint a series of murals for the Teenage Cancer Trust at Southampton General Hospital. That same year he participated in Urban in Ibiza whose theme for the year was ‘Sons of Warhol’ alongside artists such as Banksy, John Tracy and Shephard Fairey.

Hood’s Queen of Hearts piece went viral on social media in 2013. It was created in the pub one evening when he was playing cards and he uploaded the composition to Instagram where it was shared by celebrities including Sean Combs, The Game, Jessie J and Nicola Roberts. It later appeared in the March 2014 issue of Glamour Magazine, Southern Daily Echo and featured in the stage set for Mary J. Blige and Maxwell’s King and Queen of Hearts World Tour.

In April 2014, Hood’s art was exhibited in Munich at the Stroke Art Fair. In May 2014, he went with graffiti artist Inkie to New York City where they collaborated with American artists at “The Allies” group show. Hood held his first solo exhibition ‘One in One Out’ in October 2014 in Knightsbridge, London. That same year he took part in Urban in Ibiza 6, Art Wars at the Moniker Art Fair and several other exhibitions. In 2016, Hood was featured in the British edition of GQ. In May 2016, Hood’s artwork was included in Eunice Olumide’s eponymous gallery at the Groucho Club in London. In November 2016, the Westbank Gallery in London hosted Down the Rabbit Hole, an exhibition of Hood’s work with inspiration taken from Alice in Wonderland.

In 2017, Hood was invited to be a selector for the ING Discerning Eye exhibition held at Mall Galleries where four of the pieces he selected won awards and 76 of his own works were displayed. Later that year he exhibited in Chicago at Vertical Gallery as part of their winter group show “Portrait”. Hood took part as an exhibitor and selector for Art Bahrain Across Borders 2018 held at the Bahrain International Exhibition & Convention Centre an event which showcased both local and international artists.

Hood's has exhibited artwork in the galleries in London, Paris, New York, Ibiza and Munich as well as having his work auctioned off at the Houses of Parliament.
