= Lakeside School, Chandler's Ford =

Lakeside School
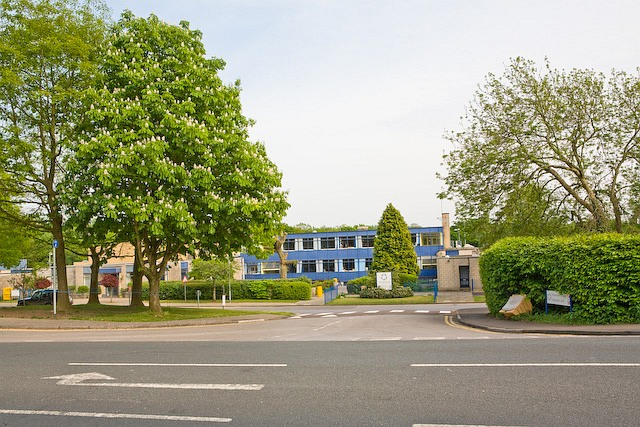
- School badge Entrance to Thornden and Lakeside Schools. Thornden school is ahead, and Lakeside school is to the right

Location
- Winchester Road; Chandler's Ford; Hampshire, SO53 2DW; England
- Coordinates: 50.993399°N 1.364714°W

Information
- Type: 11–16 boys Community special school
- Motto: Engage and Learn
- Local authority: Hampshire
- Specialist: SEN
- Department for Education URN: 116603 Tables
- Ofsted: Reports
- Headteacher: Gareth Evans
- Gender: Boys
- Age: 11 to 16
- Enrolment: 73 as of February 2016
- Website: Lakeside School

Lakeside School is an 11–16 boys special school with specialist SEN status located in Chandler's Ford, Hampshire, England. The head teacher is Mr Gareth Evans, who has won a 2008 Pearson Teaching Award for head teacher of the year. Lakeside School is located next to Thornden School.

== Overview ==
Lakeside School is a community boarding and day school administered by Hampshire County Council. It educates boys of secondary school age who have statements of special educational needs based primarily on a range of emotional and behavioural difficulties.

Boys attending Lakeside School follow a traditional curriculum, consisting of most of the subjects within the National Curriculum. All boys who attend the school are entered for examinations at Entry Level as well as at GCSE level. A programme of "Differentiated Learning" is offered to boys across all subjects. Additionally, boys are given the opportunity to partake in school trips, residential breaks, sports tournaments and alternative short courses in partnership with local youth agencies.

All boys who are enrolled at Lakeside School have an Education, Health and Care plan (EHCP) in place which is reviewed annually by teaching staff at the school in partnership with the boys' families. Support strategies are in line with the EHCP in place for boys. The schools specialist support base, Horizons, supports boys with additional support needs. Horizons provide additional interventions for boys, allowing them to be able to access Lakeside School learning and teaching provision. Additionally, Horizons provide a individualised ASD curriculum to support boys with communication skills, interaction skills, sensory processing as well as processing information. The Horizon provision benefits from additional interventions from speech and language therapists, educational psychologists and occupational therapist.

=== Residential unit ===
Lakeside School has a residential provision for up to 20 boys. The residential house is open to boys from Monday through to Thursday during the school term time. All boys and families who are interested in boarding provision are assessed by the residential team at the school, but only once the boys have settled into school. Boys who are boarding at Lakeside School are supported by experienced care workers, opportunities to develop their social and independence skills. Additionally, there is an independence unit available to only a small number of older boys who require additional support up until they leave school.

Lakeside School has a maximum capacity of 97 boys.

== Behaviour and pastoral care ==
Lakeside School has a social work team based at the school, providing one-to-one support for pupils and families. The team works with families in order to help coordinating wider agency involvement and communication with the school. Lakeside School uses a points system linked to consequences and rewards in terms of managing boys' behaviour, with all staff at the school undertaking training which focuses primarily on understanding behaviour as a means of communication, focusing on de-escalation strategies and the correct measures to "hold" pupils for safety, when necessary.

== Provision ==
Lakeside School follows a traditional curriculum, consisting of most of the subjects within the National Curriculum, and is fully equipped for learning and teaching with additional specialist facilities, including a science laboratory, food technology kitchen, an arts studio, library, gymhall, AstroTurf area as well as a garden.
