= 2024–25 Aston Villa W.F.C. season =

Aston Villa
2024–25 season
- Head coach: Robert de Pauw (until 11 December); Shaun Goater (interim, 11 December – 22 January); Natalia Arroyo (from 22 January)
- Stadium: Villa Park, Aston (league matches); Bescot Stadium, Walsall (cup matches)
- WSL: 6th
- FA Cup: Quarter-finals
- League Cup: Group stage
- Top goalscorer: League: Rachel Daly (8); All: Rachel Daly (13)
- Highest home attendance: 5,038 (vs. Manchester United, 23 March 2025)
- Lowest home attendance: 2,494 (vs. West Ham United, 15 December 2024)
- Average home league attendance: 3,413
- Biggest win: 9–0 v Bristol Rovers (H) (FA Cup, 12 January 2025)
- Biggest defeat: 0–4 v Arsenal (A) (WSL, 9 December 2024); 0–4 v Manchester United (H) (WSL, 23 March 2025)
Home colours	Away colours	Third colours

The 2024–25 Aston Villa W.F.C. season was the club's 29th season under their Aston Villa affiliation, the organisation's 51st overall season in existence, and their fifth season in the Women's Super League, the highest level of the football pyramid. Along with competing in the WSL, the club also contested two domestic cup competitions: the FA Cup and the League Cup.

Following Carla Ward's departure at the end of the previous season, Aston Villa appointed Robert de Pauw as their new manager on 29 June 2024. He had most recently been manager of Bayer Leverkusen before agreeing to mutually part ways in May 2024. On 11 December 2024, it was announced that de Pauw had left the club with immediate effect after 11 games in charge. Assistant first team coach Shaun Goater was named interim manager. On 22 January 2025, Natalia Arroyo was announced as the new permanent manager. She last coached Real Sociedad, ending her four-year managerial tenure at the conclusion of the previous season.

On 19 July 2024, the club announced that all WSL home matches would be played at Villa Park. Bescot Stadium continued to host cup matches.

== Squad ==
As of 23 March 2025

Note: Flags indicate national team as defined under FIFA eligibility rules; some limited exceptions apply. Players may hold more than one non-FIFA nationality.

No.	Pos.	Nation	Player
1	GK	CAN	Sabrina D'Angelo
2	DF	ENG	Sarah Mayling
3	DF	ESP	Paula Tomás
4	DF	IRL	Anna Patten
5	MF	ENG	Lucy Staniforth
6	DF	SCO	Rachel Corsie (captain)
7	MF	ENG	Missy Bo Kearns
8	MF	ENG	Jordan Nobbs
9	FW	ENG	Rachel Daly
11	FW	ENG	Katie Robinson
14	DF	ENG	Danielle Turner
15	DF	ENG	Lucy Parker
16	DF	SUI	Noelle Maritz

No.	Pos.	Nation	Player
17	FW	ENG	Ebony Salmon
20	FW	SCO	Kirsty Hanson
22	MF	NED	Jill Baijings (on loan from Bayern Munich)
23	FW	NED	Chasity Grant
25	MF	SCO	Miri Taylor
28	FW	BRA	Gabi Nunes
30	GK	USA	Katelin Talbert (on loan from West Ham United)
33	DF	ENG	Maz Pacheco
36	FW	ENG	Ruby-Rae Tucker
37	DF	ENG	Lydia Sallaway
38	DF	ENG	Rachel Maltby
39	FW	ENG	Mia Sorrentino
40	GK	WAL	Soffia Kelly

== Transfers ==
=== Transfers in ===
Date	Position	Nationality	Name	From	Ref.
10 July 2024	DF	(Spain)	Paula Tomás	(Spain) Levante	
15 July 2024	FW	(England)	Katie Robinson	(England) Brighton & Hove Albion	
23 July 2024	MF	(England)	Miri Taylor	(England) Liverpool	
31 July 2024	GK	(Canada)	Sabrina D'Angelo	(England) Arsenal	
1 August 2024	MF	(England)	Missy Bo Kearns	(England) Liverpool	
8 August 2024	FW	(Netherlands)	Chasity Grant	(Netherlands) Ajax	
13 September 2024	FW	(Brazil)	Gabi Nunes	(Spain) Levante	

=== Loans in ===
Date	Position	Nationality	Name	From	Until	Ref.
5 July 2024	MF	(Netherlands)	Jill Baijings	(Germany) Bayern Munich	End of season	
24 January 2025	GK	(United States)	Katelin Talbert	(England) West Ham United	End of season	

=== Transfers out ===
Date	Position	Nationality	Name	To	Ref.
4 June 2024	MF	(England)	Olivia McLoughlin	(Scotland) Rangers	
19 June 2024	FW	(Northern Ireland)	Simone Magill	(England) Birmingham City	
5 July 2024	MF	(England)	Meg Shaw	(England) Rugby Borough	
6 July 2024	FW	(Switzerland)	Alisha Lehmann	(Italy) Juventus	
30 July 2024	GK	(England)	Anna Draper	(England) Milton Keynes Dons	
31 July 2024	GK	(Netherlands)	Daphne van Domselaar	(England) Arsenal	
7 August 2024	MF	(England)	Alice Keitley	(England) Nottingham Forest	
18 August 2024	DF	(England)	Martha MacPhail	(England) Wolverhampton Wanderers	
12 January 2025	GK	(New Zealand)	Anna Leat		
20 January 2025	FW	(England)	Freya Gregory	(England) Newcastle United	
24 January 2025	MF	(France)	Kenza Dali	(United States) San Diego Wave	
24 February 2025	FW	(Canada)	Adriana Leon	(United States) San Diego Wave	

=== Loans out ===
Date	Position	Nationality	Name	To	Until	Ref.
5 July 2024	FW	(England)	Freya Gregory	(England) Southampton	15 January 2025	
23 January 2025	MF	(England)	Georgia Mullett	(England) Southampton	End of season	
28 January 2025	GK	(England)	Sophia Poor	(England) London City Lionesses	End of season	

== Preseason ==
17 August 2024 Friendly	Liverpool	0–1	Aston Villa	West Derby
		Report	Salmon	Stadium: Melwood; Attendance: Behind-closed-doors

23 August 2024 Friendly	Real Betis (Spain)	0–1	Aston Villa	Marbella, Spain
		Report	Leon 78'	Stadium: Marbella Football Cente

1 September 2024 Friendly	Charlton Athletic	2–2	Aston Villa	Charlton
	Brazil 5'; Barton 45'	Report	Leon 37'; Tomás 90'	Stadium: The Valley; Attendance: 575

8 September 2024 Friendly	Everton	1–3	Aston Villa	Walton
	S. Holmgaard	Report	Own goal (o.g.); Daly; Pacheco	Stadium: Walton Hall Park

14 September 2024 Friendly	Aston Villa	2–1	Manchester City	Bodymoor Heath
	Tomás 7'; Staniforth 71'	Report	Shaw 76'	Stadium: Bodymoor Heath; Attendance: Behind-closed-doors

== Women's Super League ==
=== Results summary ===
Overall								Home						Away					
Pld	W	D	L	GF	GA	GD	Pts	W	D	L	GF	GA	GD	W	D	L	GF	GA	GD
22	7	4	11	32	44	−12	25	4	2	5	19	21	−2	3	2	6	13	23	−10

Last updated: 10 May 2025.
Source: WSL

=== Results by matchday ===
Round	1	2	3	4	5	6	7	8	9	10	11	12	13	14	15	16	17	18	19	20	21	22
Ground	A	H	A	H	A	H	A	H	A	H	A	H	H	A	H	A	H	A	A	H	A	H
Result	L	D	L	D	L	L	D	W	L	W	D	L	L	L	L	L	L	W	W	W	W	W
Position	9	8	9	9	10	10	11	8	9	7	8	9	10	11	11	11	11	11	11	9	9	6

A = Away; H = Home; W = Win; D = Draw; L = Loss

=== Results ===
20 September 2024 1	Chelsea	1–0	Aston Villa	Kingston upon Thames
19:00	Rytting Kaneryd 36'; Hamano (yellow card) 90+3'	Report	Staniforth (yellow card) 4'	Stadium: Kingsmeadow; Attendance: 4,337; Referee: Kirsty Dowle

29 September 2024 2	Aston Villa	2–2	Tottenham Hotspur	Aston
16:30	Leon 78'; Daly 88'	Report	Summanen 23' (pen.), (yellow card) 75'; England 90+6'	Stadium: Villa Park; Attendance: 2,912; Referee: Lauren Impey

5 October 2024 3	Brighton & Hove Albion	4–2	Aston Villa	Crawley
12:30	Parris 15'; Bremer 38'; Pattinson (yellow card) 77' (yellow-red card) 90+4'; Kirby 79' (pen.); Agyemang (yellow card) 90+1', (goal) 90+7'	Report	Daly 13', 55' (pen.); Tomás (red card) 76'; Robinson (yellow card) 77'; D'Angelo (yellow card) 90+1'	Stadium: Broadfield Stadium; Attendance: 2,152; Referee: Ryan Atkin

13 October 2024 4	Aston Villa	0–0	Leicester City	Aston
14:00	Kearns (yellow card) 19'; Maritz (yellow card) 45+2'; Staniforth (yellow card) 80'	Report	Nevin (yellow card) 33'; Kees (yellow card) 45'	Stadium: Villa Park; Attendance: 2,907; Referee: Amy Fearn

20 October 2024 5	Manchester City	2–1	Aston Villa	Manchester
12:15	Hemp 62'; Roord 70'	Report	Nunes 20'	Stadium: Academy Stadium; Attendance: 3,528; Referee: Kirsty Dowle

3 November 2024 6	Aston Villa	1–2	Liverpool	Aston
16:30	Nunes 49'; Taylor (yellow card) 65'	Report	Hinds 26', 43'; Matthews (yellow card) 37'; Parry (yellow card) 88'; Laws (yellow card) 90+4'; Holland (yellow card) 90+7'	Stadium: Villa Park; Attendance: 3,213; Referee: Phoebe Cross

10 November 2024 7	Manchester United	0–0	Aston Villa	Leigh
18:45	George (yellow card) 33'; Janssen (yellow card) 51'; Le Tissier (yellow card) 67'; Geyse (yellow card) 84'	Report	Daly (yellow card) 31'	Stadium: Leigh Sports Village; Attendance: 3,833; Referee: Cheryl Foster

17 November 2024 8	Aston Villa	3–2	Crystal Palace	Aston
14:00	Patten 40'; Daly 45+5'; Salmon 90+4'	Report	Cato 30'; Woodham (yellow card) 45+8'; Blanchard 86'	Stadium: Villa Park; Attendance: 2,673; Referee: Grace Lowe

8 December 2024 9	Arsenal	4–0	Aston Villa	Holloway
14:00	Russo 17', 90+4'; Mead 38'; Blackstenius 70'; McCabe (yellow card) 89'	Report	Patten (yellow card) 16'	Stadium: Emirates Stadium; Attendance: 29,515; Referee: Abigail Byrne

15 December 2024 10	Aston Villa	3–1	West Ham United	Aston
14:00	Leon 4', 43'; Maritz (yellow card) 20'; Nobbs (yellow card) 53'; Dali 83'	Report	Asseyi 21'; Li (yellow card) 77'	Stadium: Villa Park; Attendance: 2,494; Referee: Grace Lowe

18 January 2025 11	Everton	1–1	Aston Villa	Walton
17:30	Gago (yellow card) 78'; Sarri 89'; Ribadeira (yellow card) 90+1'; Lawley (yellow card) 90+6'	Report	Daly 31'; Baijings (yellow card) 45+2'; Maritz (yellow card) 90+5'	Stadium: Walton Hall Park; Attendance: 973; Referee: Stacey Fullicks

25 January 2025 12	Aston Villa	2–4	Manchester City	Aston
12:00	Grant 6'; Aleixandri 46' (o.g.); Nobbs (yellow card) 48'	Report	Miedema 28', 35'; Fowler 54'; Park 62'	Stadium: Villa Park; Attendance: 3,041; Referee: Melissa Burgin

2 February 2025 13	Aston Villa	0–1	Chelsea	Aston
14:30	Baijings (yellow card) 61'; Daly (yellow card) 90+7'	Report	Mayling 82' (o.g.)	Stadium: Villa Park; Attendance: 4,324; Referee: Lisa Benn

16 February 2025 14	Leicester City	3–0	Aston Villa	Leicester
15:00	Cayman 29', 49'; Thibaud 50'; Bott (yellow card) 55'; Mace (yellow card) 73'; O'Brien (yellow card) 90'	Report	Baijings (yellow card) 73'	Stadium: King Power Stadium; Attendance: 2,065; Referee: Adewunmi Soneye

2 March 2025 15	Aston Villa	0–2	Everton	Aston
14:00	Robinson (yellow card) 48'	Report	Mjelde 16'; Ladd (yellow card) 25'; Hayashi 59'	Stadium: Villa Park; Attendance: 2,936; Referee: Stacey Pearson

16 March 2025 16	Crystal Palace	3–1	Aston Villa	Sutton
14:00	Nouwen 33'; Weerden 53'; Stengel 90+5'	Report	Maritz (yellow card) 35'; Parker 85'	Stadium: Gander Green Lane; Attendance: 1,130; Referee: Stacey Fullicks

23 March 2025 17	Aston Villa	0–4	Manchester United	Aston
16:30	Turner (yellow card) 50'	Report	Terland 22', 31'; George (yellow card) 36'; Clinton 45'; Galton 64'; Malard (yellow card) 86'	Stadium: Villa Park; Attendance: 5,038; Referee: Emily Heaslip

30 March 2025 18	Liverpool	1–2	Aston Villa	St Helens
14:00	Höbinger 57' (pen.); Fisk (yellow card) 90+3'	Report	Taylor (yellow card) 45+1'; Hanson 68'; Clark 87' (o.g.); Nunes (yellow card) 90+9'	Stadium: Totally Wicked Stadium; Attendance: 3,082; Referee: Megan Wilson

20 April 2025 19	Tottenham Hotspur	2–3	Aston Villa	Leyton
14:00	Naz 65'; Summanen (yellow card) 66'; Morris 70'; Spence (yellow card) 90+6'	Report	Patten 30'; Parker (yellow card) 38'; Salmon 56'; Pacheco (yellow card) 60'; Staniforth (yellow card) 82'; Hanson 90+1'	Stadium: Brisbane Road; Attendance: 1,624; Referee: Stacey Fullicks

30 April 2025 20	Aston Villa	5–2	Arsenal	Aston
18:00	Nobbs 30'; Hanson 45+1'; Grant 46', 73'; Daly 59'; D'Angelo (yellow card) 76'	Report	Blackstenius 67'; Russo 71'; Catley (yellow card) 85'	Stadium: Villa Park; Attendance: 4,590; Referee: Grace Lowe

4 May 2025 21	West Ham United	2–3	Aston Villa	Dagenham
15:00	Martinez 18', (yellow card) 44'; Ueki 34'; Gorry (yellow card) 50'; Zadorsky (yellow card) 59'	Report	Salmon 5'; Taylor (yellow card) 37'; Daly 37'; Parker (yellow card) 39'; Grant 54', (yellow card) 90'	Stadium: Victoria Road; Referee: Stacey Pearson

10 May 2025 22	Aston Villa	3–1	Brighton & Hove Albion	Aston
12:30	Salmon 5'; Daly 44', (yellow card) 47'; Pacheco 74'	Report	Agyemang (yellow card) 42'; Stefanović (yellow card) 90+2'; Parris 90+4'	Stadium: Villa Park; Attendance: 3,492; Referee: Lisa Benn

=== League table ===
Pos	Team	Pld	W	D	L	GF	GA	GD	Pts
4	Manchester City	22	13	4	5	49	28	+21	43
5	Brighton & Hove Albion	22	8	4	10	35	41	−6	28
6	Aston Villa	22	7	4	11	32	44	−12	25
7	Liverpool	22	7	4	11	22	37	−15	25
8	Everton	22	6	6	10	24	32	−8	24

Source: The Football Association
Rules for classification: 1) Points; 2) Goal difference; 3) Number of goals scored.

== Women's FA Cup ==
As a member of the first tier, Aston Villa entered the FA Cup in the fourth round proper.

12 January 2025 Fourth round	Aston Villa	9–0	Bristol Rovers	Walsall
17:45	Daly 3', 8'; Nunes 6', 26', 65'; Tomás 23'; Grant 46'; Hanson 56'; Baijings 80'	Report		Stadium: Bescot Stadium; Attendance: 972; Referee: Adewunmi Soneye

8 February 2025 Fifth round	Aston Villa	3–2	Brighton & Hove Albion	Walsall
12:00	Patten (yellow card) 36', (goal) 45+2'; Daly 50'; Grant 55'; Mayling (yellow card) 81'; Baijings (yellow card) 90+6'	Report	Parris 45', 72'; Thorisdottir (yellow card) 56'	Stadium: Bescot Stadium; Attendance: 821; Referee: Melissa Burgin

9 March 2025 Quarter-final	Manchester City	2–0	Aston Villa	Manchester
12:30	Prior (yellow card) 42'; Shaw 53'; Park 72'	Report		Stadium: Academy Stadium; Attendance: 2,086; Referee: Abigail Byrne

== Women's League Cup ==
2 October 2024 Group stage	Aston Villa	2–0	Crystal Palace	Walsall
19:15	Hanson 80'; Robinson 90+2'	Report	Cato (yellow card) 59'	Stadium: Bescot Stadium; Attendance: 422; Referee: Adewunmi Soneye

23 November 2024 Group stage	Tottenham Hotspur	1–0	Aston Villa	Leyton
12:15	Nildén (yellow card) 54'; Summanen 60'	Report		Stadium: Brisbane Road; Attendance: 820; Referee: Stacey Fullicks

11 December 2024 Group stage	Aston Villa	4–1	Charlton Athletic	Walsall
19:15	Daly 25', 85'; Salmon 32', 47'; Taylor (yellow card) 57'; Leon (yellow card) 81'	Report	Newsham 10', (yellow card) 90+3'; Barton (yellow card) 55'	Stadium: Bescot Stadium; Attendance: 659; Referee: Stacey Fullicks

Pos	Team	Pld	W	WPEN	LPEN	L	GF	GA	GD	Pts	Qualification	TOT	AST	CRY	CHA
1	Tottenham Hotspur	3	3	0	0	0	5	1	+4	9	Advanced to knock-out stage	—	1–0	–	–
2	Aston Villa	3	2	0	0	1	6	2	+4	6		–	—	2–0	4–1
3	Crystal Palace	3	1	0	0	2	2	4	−2	3		0–2	–	—	2–0
4	Charlton Athletic	3	0	0	0	3	2	8	−6	0		1–2	–	–	—

Updated to match(es) played on 23 November 2024. Source: Women's League Cup
Rules for classification: 1) Points; 2) Goal difference; 3) Number of goals scored; 4) Number of wins; 5) Head-to-head record

== Squad statistics ==
=== Appearances ===
As of match played 10 May 2025

Starting appearances are listed first, followed by substitute appearances after the + symbol where applicable.

No.	Pos	Nat	Player	Total		WSL		FA Cup		League Cup	
No.	Pos	Nat	Player	Apps	Goals	Apps	Goals	Apps	Goals	Apps	Goals
1	GK	(Canada) CAN	Sabrina D'Angelo	28	0	22	0	3	0	3	0
2	DF	(England) ENG	Sarah Mayling	17	0	7+6	0	3	0	1	0
3	DF	(Spain) ESP	Paula Tomás	17	1	9+4	0	2	1	1+1	0
4	DF	(Republic of Ireland) IRL	Anna Patten	27	2	21	2	3	0	3	0
5	MF	(England) ENG	Lucy Staniforth	14	0	7+5	0	0	0	2	0
6	DF	(Scotland) SCO	Rachel Corsie	2	0	0+2	0	0	0	0	0
7	MF	(England) ENG	Missy Bo Kearns	18	0	12+2	0	0+2	0	1+1	0
8	MF	(England) ENG	Jordan Nobbs	24	1	18+2	1	2+1	0	0+1	0
9	FW	(England) ENG	Rachel Daly	28	13	22	8	2+1	3	1+2	2
11	FW	(England) ENG	Katie Robinson	21	1	5+11	0	1+1	0	3	1
14	DF	(England) ENG	Danielle Turner	21	0	13+3	0	1+1	0	3	0
15	DF	(England) ENG	Lucy Parker	19	1	14+2	1	2	0	0+1	0
16	DF	(Switzerland) SUI	Noelle Maritz	23	0	16+2	0	1+2	0	2	0
17	FW	(England) ENG	Ebony Salmon	27	6	12+9	4	2+1	0	3	2
20	FW	(Scotland) SCO	Kirsty Hanson	23	5	13+5	3	1+2	1	0+2	1
22	MF	(Netherlands) NED	Jill Baijings	15	1	8+4	0	2+1	1	0	0
23	FW	(Netherlands) NED	Chasity Grant	25	6	17+4	4	2+1	2	0+1	0
25	MF	(England) ENG	Miri Taylor	23	0	6+11	0	2+1	0	3	0
28	FW	(Brazil) BRA	Gabi Nunes	21	5	9+6	2	3	3	2+1	0
30	GK	(United States) USA	Katelin Talbert	1	0	0+1	0	0	0	0	0
33	DF	(England) ENG	Maz Pacheco	12	1	6+3	1	0	0	2+1	0
36	FW	(England) ENG	Ruby-Rae Tucker	0	0	0	0	0	0	0	0
37	DF	(England) ENG	Lydia Sallaway	1	0	0+1	0	0	0	0	0
38	DF	(England) ENG	Rachel Maltby	2	0	0+2	0	0	0	0	0
39	FW	(England) ENG	Mia Sorrentino	0	0	0	0	0	0	0	0
40	GK	(Wales) WAL	Soffia Kelly	0	0	0	0	0	0	0	0
Players away from the club on loan:
18	MF	(England) ENG	Georgia Mullett	1	0	0	0	0	0	0+1	0
35	GK	(England) ENG	Sophia Poor	1	0	0	0	0+1	0	0	0
Players who appeared for the club but left during the season:
10	MF	(France) FRA	Kenza Dali	13	1	4+6	1	0	0	1+2	0
19	FW	(Canada) CAN	Adriana Leon	15	3	4+7	3	1	0	2+1	0
