= Ahmad Tea =

British family-owned tea company

Ahmad Tea Limited
- Type: Private
- Industry: Beverages
- Founded: 13 May 1986 in Southampton, Hampshire, England
- Headquarters: Chandler's Ford, Hampshire, England
- Products: Tea; Coffee; Cocoa; Spices
- Revenue: £31.96 million (2018)
- Number of employees: 78
- Website: ahmadtea.com

Ahmad Tea Limited is a British family-owned tea company based in Chandler's Ford, Hampshire, England. It sells a range of tea bags, specialty teas and gifts including black tea, green tea, flavoured teas, and herbal teas. The company moved from London to a new headquarters in Chandler's Ford in 2010.

== History ==
Ahmad Tea Limited was founded in 1986 by British Iranian businessman Rahim Afshar and his brothers, and is named after their father.

Ahmad Tea distributes to over 80 countries on six continents, where it can be found in selected restaurants, hotels, specialty shops as well as some chains. Ahmad Tea’s headquarters also contains a tea museum, which attracts local guests. Ahmad Tea earned over 20 Great Taste Awards for various products.

In 2012, in partnership with U Support charity, Ahmad Tea donated its range of teas to ChariTeas, a branded tea room in Hampshire, whose proceeds go to supporting disabled children. In 2013, Ahmad Tea was awarded the ethical investor of the year award for its charitable initiatives in the UK and support of orphanages in Mali, Russia, Sri Lanka and Ukraine.

== See also ==
- Ethical Tea Partnership
- List of tea companies in the United Kingdom
