= Ethical Tea Partnership =

Ethical trade advocacy and certification body

The Ethical Tea Partnership is a Private Limited Company that has been working with tea producers and tea companies to improve the sustainability of the tea industry since 1997. This industry-wide initiative, which was originally called the Tea Sourcing Partnership, was established by a number of large UK tea packing companies who decided to work together to improve the social conditions in their supply chains. Later on, ETP membership opened up to non UK-based tea packers, and extended the scheme to include environmental issues as well.

The ETP works in all the main tea producing regions, with a London-based Secretariat, and five regional managers based in Kenya, India, Indonesia, Sri Lanka and China.

== Monitoring and Certification ==
The ETP monitoring programme has been running since 1997 and is free of charge to producers. The programm's environmental and social provisions are outlined in the ETP Global Standard, and are closely aligned to the main certification programmes operating under (Fairtrade, Rainforest Alliance and UTZ Certified) programmes.

The social and labour provisions are based on the Ethical Trading Initiative (ETI) Base Code, which covers the International Labour Organization's (ILO) core conventions.

=== Social Provisions ===
- Freely chosen employment
- Freedom of Association & the right to collective bargaining
- Health and Safety
- Child Labour
- Wages and Benefits
- Working Hours
- Discrimination
- Regular Employment
- Disciplinary Procedures

=== Environmental provisions ===
- Environmental Management Systems
- Agrochemicals
- Soil Conservation
- Ecosystem Conservation
- Water Conservation
- Energy Use
- Waste Management

To increase impact and reduce duplication, the ETP has formal relationships with Fairtrade, Rainforest Alliance, and UTZ Certified. The ETP works to facilitate certification where requested by member companies, when producers are interested. Through its producer support programmes, the ETP also works with certification programmes, and with a wide range of NGOs and development organisations.

== Producer Support ==
In order to help producers to meet international social and environmental standards the ETP co-ordinates a series of training and improvement programmes. These are aimed at both management and workers and cover a number of issues including:

- Factory health and safety
- Agrochemical management
- Fair treatment of workers
- Gender
- Environmental management (including wildlife and biodiversity)

These capacity building projects are facilitated by the ETP Regional Managers who build relationships with tea producers and support them to participate effectively in the ETP programme.

ETP has been working with ETI on a training programme focused on reducing discrimination and harassment of workers in Africa. This type of training supplements the auditing process by offering practical support to producers and it tackles long-term problematic issues that cannot be addressed by auditing and certification alone.

ETP has also played a valued partnership role in CARE International’s long-term project to improve living and working conditions in tea communities in Sri Lanka.

== Strategic Sustainability ==
As well as addressing issues that pose an immediate threat to workers and the environment, the ETP also works on those issues that threaten the long-term future sustainability of tea. For example, in Kenya, the ETP is working in partnership with GIZ (the German Development Agency) to help in excess of 10,000 smallholder farmers to adapt to the effects of climate change in order to help them secure their future livelihoods from tea. Together, ETP and GIZ are developing toolkits for good climate change adaptation practices that span from technical solutions (good practice farming) to socio-economic approaches and institutional and political options.

As well as working with NGO and development organisations, the Ethical Tea Partnership works closely with tea producers to share and develop ideas on how to improve the sustainability of tea.

== Membership ==
Membership of the Ethical Tea Partnership is open to any company involved with sourcing, trading or packing of tea sold in Europe, North America, Australia and New Zealand. The organization works with members by checking that their suppliers meet social and environmental standards.

=== 21st century membership ===
The ETP's membership, in 2014, consisted of 29 companies:

- Ahmad Tea
- All About Tea
- alveus tea
- Bell Tea and Coffee
- Bettys & Taylors of Harrogate Ltd
- Bigelow Tea
- Birchall Tea
- Booths
- D.E Master Blenders 1753
- DJ Miles & Co Ltd
- interTee
- J.T. Ronnefeldt
- Jing Tea
- Mabroc
- Mars Drinks
- Metropolitan Tea Co
- Mother Parkers Tea & Coffee Inc
- Newby Teas
- Ostfriesische Tee Gesellschaft (OTG)
- project t
- Reginald Ames
- Ringtons
- Steeped Tea
- stick & lembke
- Tazo tea
- Tea Monkey
- Tesco
- Tetley
- The Republic of Tea
- Twinings
- United Coffee
- We Are Tea
- Windmill

=== Founding Members ===
Originally, membership to ETP was only open to UK-based tea packing companies; the founding members were:

- The Tetley Group
- Twinings
- Bettys and Taylors
- Spicers
- Unilever
- Windmill Tea
- DJ Miles
- Gala Tea and Coffee
- Finlays
- Williamsons
- Matthew Algie
