= Toynbee School =

Coordinates: 50.978372°N 1.373925°W

The Toynbee School
- Chandlers Ford, Hampshire, SO53 2PL; England

Information
- Type: Comprehensive
- Motto: "Personal Best"
- Established: 1921
- Local authority: Hampshire
- Department for Education URN: 116411 Tables
- Ofsted: Reports
- Head teacher: Matthew Longden
- Gender: Mixed
- Age: 11 to 16
- Enrolment: 1532
- Houses: 4
- Website: http://www.toynbee.hants.sch.uk/

Toynbee School Badge

Toynbee School is an 11-16 (no sixth form) secondary school in Chandler's Ford, Hampshire. The head teacher is Matthew Longden. The school currently has 1532 pupils enrolled in five year groups making the average 307 pupils/year.

== History ==
Toynbee School was first formed in 1929 when it was called the 'Eastleigh Boys Senior School' and was based on Derby Road. In 1932 the school was moved to newer, more modern buildings on Leigh Road and became known as Toynbee Road Secondary Boys School. In 1964 the school moved again and became co-educational with the Chamberlayne Road Girls School. The school first became known as Toynbee School when it moved to the North End buildings on Leigh Road. Toynbee School became a comprehensive school after this move. Toynbee School moved to its present site on Bodycoats Road, Chandler's Ford in 1977.

== Curriculum ==
Toynbee School's curriculum is "broad and balanced" according to the school so as to provide the framework for pupils to have the "skills, knowledge, attitudes and values which will help them play a full and useful role in all aspects of adult society." Toynbee School has a school day shorter than the national average.

Some pupils with learning difficulties sometimes receive special educational support. The school also benefits from having the ‘Toynbee Resource for Pupils with Visual Impairment’. This department specialises in supporting visually impaired pupils whilst helping them to maintain their independence.

== Facilities ==
Toynbee School has seven science laboratories, four language rooms, eight maths rooms, eight English rooms, two ICT suites with broadband internet access, two design technology rooms, two art rooms, a theatre and dance studio and two recently-refurbished music rooms with three practice rooms.

Sports

Toynbee has a large sports hall with changing and storage facilities. There are also tennis courts, a sports field and hard court facilities, which was professionally returfed from September–October 2025. There is also a Learning Resource Centre complete with many computers and staffed by a full-time librarian.

On the 28th March 2025, it was announced that brand new bicycle sheds complete with CCTV footage were being built on the school site, with an estimated completion date of Friday 2 May 2025.

Due to increased pupil demand, two temporary modular buildings were built on the former car park, holding an English classroom and PD (Personal Development) classroom, as well as a hub for KS3 pupils with behavioral difficulties.

The Pavilion

On the 28th March 2024, a new glass structure measuring 25m by 16m called “The Pavilion” was announced, and was in construction, at Toynbee. It is now fully built, and has a defibrillator in close proximity, as well as heaters and an AV system, and a projector at the front of the hall. It also seats 300 with specialised table/chair changing capabilities.

== Notable alumni ==
- Alejandro Gomes Rodríguez, professional footballer who currently plays for Lyon
- Kai Widdrington, dancer and choreographer
