= Gabi Nunes =

Brazilian footballer (born 1997)

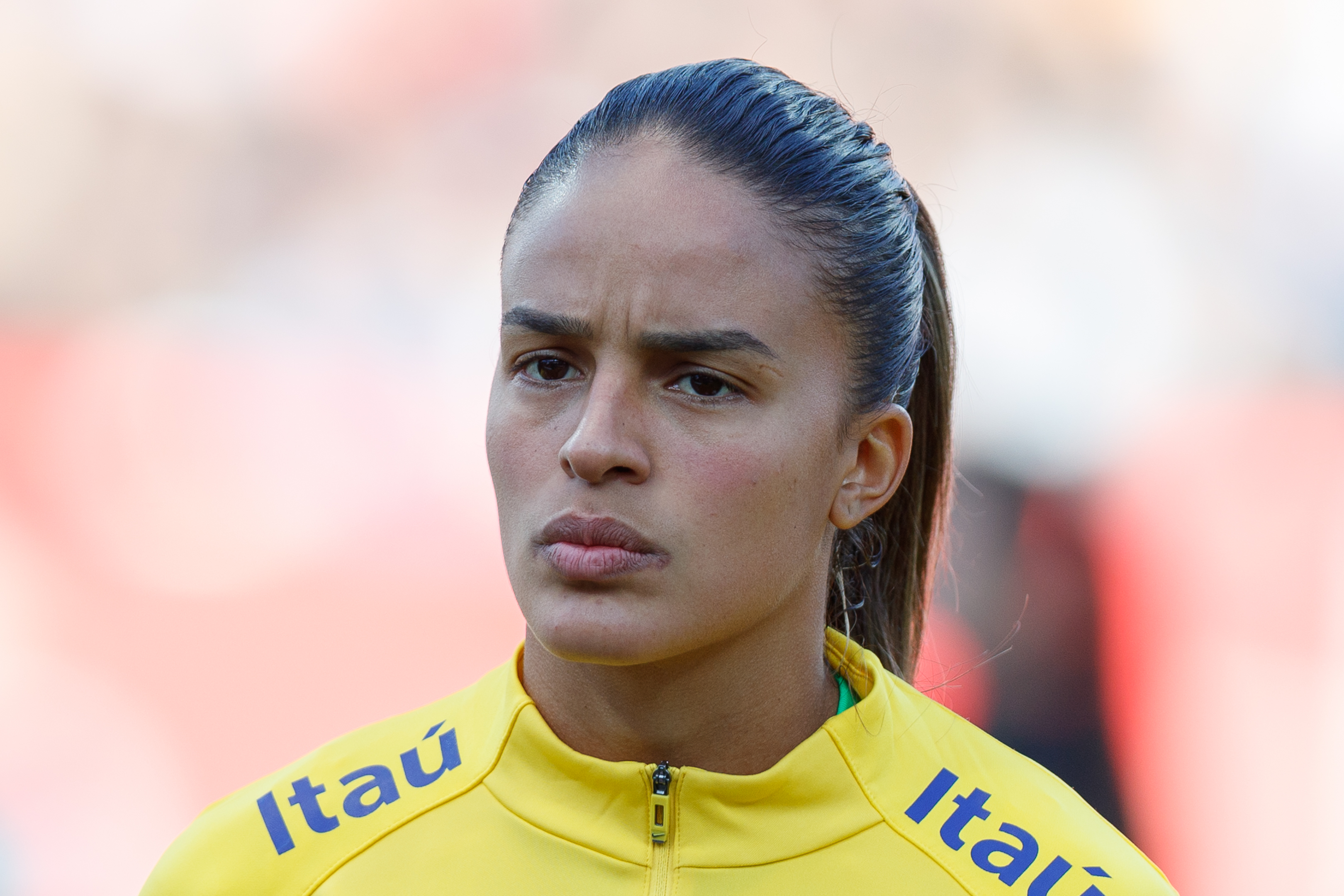
- Nunes in 2023

Personal information
- Full name: Gabriela Nunes da Silva
- Date of birth: 10 March 1997 (age 29)
- Place of birth: São Paulo, Brazil
- Height: 1.71 m (5 ft 7 in)
- Position: Forward

Team information
- Current team: Atlético Madrid

Youth career
- Centro Olímpico

Senior career*
Years	Team	Apps	(Gls)
2014–2015	Centro Olímpico	23	(17)
2016–2021	Corinthians	63	(38)
2021–2023	Madrid CFF	54	(17)
2023–2024	Levante UD	28	(11)
2024–2026	Aston Villa	18	(2)
2026	Orlando Pride	2	(0)
2026–	Atlético Madrid	0	(0)

International career^{‡}
2013–2014	Brazil U-17	4	(0)
2015–2016	Brazil U-20	16	(11)
2016–	Brazil	38	(8)
Medal record
Women's football
Representing Brazil
Olympic Games
Silver medal – second place	2024 Paris
- * Club domestic league appearances and goals as of 23:25, 31 August 2026 (UTC) ‡ National team caps and goals as of 14 September 2024

Gabriela "Gabi" Nunes da Silva (Brazilian Portuguese: [ɡabɾiˈɛlɐ ˈɡabi ˈnuniz da ˈsiwvɐ]; born 10 March 1997) is a Brazilian professional footballer who plays as a forward for Atlético Madrid in Liga F and the Brazil national team. She represented her country at the 2023 FIFA Women's World Cup and the 2024 Summer Olympics, receiving a silver medal at the latter.

== Club career ==
Nunes began her career in football playing for the Centro Olímpico. In this club she played for the youth categories (U-15 and U-17) and the senior team. In 2015, she moved to the Osasco Audax to play the Paulista Women's Soccer Championship and became the tournament's top scorer scoring 12 goals. For the national championship at the end of 2015, Nunes returned to the Centro Olímpico and scored fourteen goals in twelve matches, crowning herself the tournament's top scorer.

The following year Nunes transferred to Corinthians/Audax to play the national championship in 2016. The striker scored seven goals in ten games, but her team were eliminated in the quarterfinals. Nunes won the 2016 Brazil Cup, scoring a goal in the final against São José. Afterwards, she played for Madrid CFF and Levante UD.

On 13 September 2024, Nunes signed for Aston Villa and made her debut in a 2–0 win against Crystal Palace in the Women's League Cup at Bescot Stadium.

On 4 August 2026, the Orlando Pride announced they had signed Nunes through the end of the season. She made two appearances and a month later agreed to the mutual termination of her contract. She was then announced by Atlético Madrid.

== International career ==
=== Youth ===
Gabi Nunes started representing Brazil internationally in 2013, when the striker became part of the squad that participated in the 2013 South American Under-17. Nunes played four matches in the competition, but Brazil were eliminated in the group stage.

In November 2015 she competed in the 2015 South American Under-20. Nunes scored three goals and helped Brazil win the seventh title in this competition. With this success in the 2015 South American Under-20, Nunes was called to join the group that was preparing for the Olympics.

Nunes participated in the 2016 FIFA U-20 Women's World Cup, scoring five goals in four matches and won a silver shoe of the competition, becoming the first Brazilian to win this award and score in all matches that participated in a FIFA U-20 Women's World Cup.

=== Senior ===
Nunes was given her senior debut with Brazil after returning from the 2016 U-20 World Cup. She made 4 appearances in 2016 during friendly matches as well as an additional 3 appearances in friendlies in 2017. In the Summer of 2017, Nunes was included in the Brazil squad for the Tournament of Nations, starting in 2 of the 3 games. In 2021, Nunes joined the team for the 2021 Torneio Internacional de Manaus de Futebol Feminino. She started the second game of the tournament against Venezuela and scored her first international goal at the senior level.

Nunes was called up to the Brazil squad for the 2023 FIFA Women's World Cup.

On 1 February 2024, Nunes was called up to the Brazil squad for the 2024 CONCACAF W Gold Cup.

On 2 July 2024, Nunes was called up to the Brazil squad for the 2024 Summer Olympics.

== Career statistics ==
=== Club ===
As of match played 29 August 2025

Appearances and goals by club, season and competition
Club	Season	League			National cup (Note: Includes Copa do Brasil de Futebol Feminino, Copa de la Reina, Women's FA Cup)		State Cup (Note: Includes Campeonato Paulista de Futebol Feminino)		League cup (Note: Includes Women's League Cup)		Continental (Note: Includes Copa Libertadores Femenina, UEFA Women's Champions League)		Other (Note: Includes Supercopa de España Femenina and Women's League Cup)		Total	
Club	Season	Division	Apps	Goals	Apps	Goals	Apps	Goals	Apps	Goals	Apps	Goals	Apps	Goals	Apps	Goals
Centro Olímpico	2014	Brasileirão Feminino	11	3	0	0	0	0	—		—		—		11	3
Centro Olímpico	2015	Brasileirão Feminino	12	14	0	0	0	0	—		—		—		12	14
Centro Olímpico	Total		23	17	0	0	0	0	—		—		—		23	17
Corinthians	2016	Brasileirão Feminino	10	7	5	3	0	0	—		—		—		15	10
Corinthians	2017	Brasileirão Feminino	18	12	—		1	0	—		—		—		19	12
Corinthians	2018	Brasileirão Feminino	0	0	—		0	0	—		—		—		0	0
Corinthians	2019	Brasileirão Feminino	11	9	—		9	5	—		—		—		20	14
Corinthians	2020	Brasileirão Feminino	13	1	—		11	11	—		—		—		24	12
Corinthians	2021	Brasileirão Feminino	11	9	—		0	0	—		6	7	—		17	16
Corinthians	Total		63	38	5	3	21	16	—		6	7	—		95	64
Madrid CFF	2021–22	Primera División	27	7	2	0	—		—		—		—		29	7
Madrid CFF	2022–23	Liga F	27	8	2	1	—		—		—		—		29	9
Madrid CFF	Total		54	15	4	1	—		—		—		—		58	16
Levante UD	2023–24	Liga F	28	11	2	0	—		—		2	3	2 (Note: Appearances in Supercopa de España Femenina)	2	34	16
Aston Villa	2024–25	Women's Super League	16	2	3	3	—		3	0	—		—		22	5
Aston Villa	2025–26	Women's Super League	2	0	0	0	—		0	0	—		—		2	0
Orlando Pride	2026	National Women's Soccer League	2	0	0	0	—		0	0	—		—		2	0
Career total			188	83	14	10	21	16	3	0	8	10	2	2	236	118

=== International ===
As of match played 10 August 2024

Appearances and goals by national team and year
National team	Year	Apps	Goals
Brazil	2016	3	0
Brazil	2017	6	0
Brazil	2021	1	1
Brazil	2022	6	2
Brazil	2023	9	2
Brazil	2024	13	3
Total		38	8

Scores and results list Brazil's goal tally first, score column indicates score after each Nunes goal.

List of international goals scored by Gabi Nunes
No.	Date	Venue	Opponent	Score	Result	Competition
1	28 November 2021	Arena da Amazônia, Manaus, Brazil	Venezuela	2–1	4–1	International Tournament of Manaus 2021
2	11 April 2022	Pinatar Arena, Murcia, Spain	Hungary	1–0	3–1	Friendly
3	11 April 2022	Pinatar Arena, Murcia, Spain	Hungary	3–0	3–1	Friendly
4	2 July 2023	Estádio Nacional Mané Garrincha, Brasília, Brazil	Chile	1–0	4–0	Friendly
5	6 December 2023	Fonte Luminosa, Araraquara, Brazil	Nicaragua	1–0	4–0	Friendly
6	21 February 2024	Snapdragon Stadium, San Diego, United States	Puerto Rico	1–0	1–0	2024 CONCACAF W Gold Cup
7	2 March 2024	BMO Stadium, Los Angeles, United States	Argentina	4–0	5–1	2024 CONCACAF W Gold Cup
8	25 July 2024	Nouveau Stade de Bordeaux, Bordeaux, France	Nigeria	1–0	1–0	2024 Summer Olympics

== Honours ==
Brazil

- Summer Olympics silver medal: 2024
