= Paula Tomás =

Spanish footballer (born 2001)

Personal information
- Full name: Paula Tomás Serer
- Date of birth: 11 September 2001 (age 25)
- Place of birth: El Verger, Spain
- Height: 1.70 m (5 ft 7 in)
- Position: Left back

Senior career*
Years	Team	Apps	(Gls)
2016–2017	Levante C		
2017–2020	Levante B	1+	(0+)
2020–2024	Levante	89	(2)
2024–2026	Aston Villa	15	(0)

International career
2018	Spain U17	1	(0)
2021–2023	Spain U23	7	(0)
2023	Spain	2	(0)
- * Club domestic league appearances and goals

Paula Tomás Serer (Valencian: [ˈpawla toˈmas seˈɾeɾ]; born 11 September 2001) is a Spanish former professional footballer who played as a left back.

== Club career ==
Tomás started her career at Levante C and progressed through to the senior team.

On 10 July 2024, Tomás signed for English Women's Super League club Aston Villa for an undisclosed fee. On 5 October 2024, Tomás received a red card for blocking Kiko Seike’s run, leading to a late penalty for Brighton & Hove Albion and a three match ban. The ban was appealed but to no avail.

On 28 April 2025 it was announced Tomás would miss the remainder of the season, after picking up a hip injury against Tottenham Hotspur.

On 24 April 2026, Tomás announced her immediate retirement from professional football, due to an ongoing knee injury.

== Career statistics ==
=== Club ===
Appearances and goals by club, season and competition
Club	Season	League			National cup		League cup		Europe		Other		Total	
Club	Season	Division	Apps	Goals	Apps	Goals	Apps	Goals	Apps	Goals	Apps	Goals	Apps	Goals
Levante	2020–21	Primera División	17	0	3	0	—		—		1 (Note: Appearance in Supercopa de España Femenina)	0	21	0
Levante	2021–22	Primera División	23	1	2	0	—		4 (Note: Appearances in UEFA Women's Champions League)	0	1	0	30	1
Levante	2022–23	Liga F	26	0	1	0	—		—		—		27	0
Levante	2023–24	Liga F	23	1	2	0	—		2	1	2	0	29	2
Levante	Total		89	2	8	0	0	0	6	1	4	0	107	3
Aston Villa	2024–25	Women's Super League	13	0	2	1	2	0	—		—		17	1
Aston Villa	2025–26	Women's Super League	2	0	0	0	0	0	0	0	0	0	2	0
Aston Villa	Total		15	0	2	1	2	0	0	0	0	0	19	1
Career total			104	2	9	1	2	0	6	1	4	0	126	4

=== International ===
Appearances and goals by national team and year
National team	Year	Apps	Goals
Spain	2023	2	0
Total		2	0

== Honours ==
Spain U17

UEFA Women's Under-17 Championship winner: 2018

Spain

FFA Cup of Nations runner-up: 2023

Levante

Copa de la Reina de Fútbol runner-up: 2020/21

Supercopa de España Femenina runner-up: 2020/21, 2023/24
