= Chandler's Ford =

Town in Hampshire, England

Coordinates: 50°59′02″N 1°22′45″W

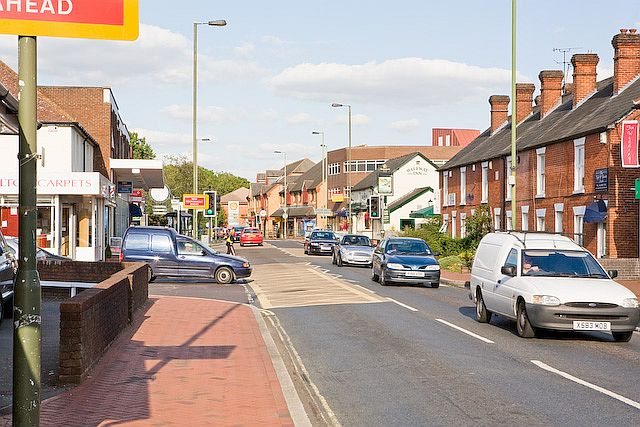
- Junction of Winchester Road and Brownhill Road

- Location within Hampshire
- Population: 21,436
- OS grid reference: SU435212
- Civil parish: Chandler's Ford
- District: Eastleigh
- Shire county: Hampshire
- Region: South East
- Country: England
- Sovereign state: United Kingdom
- Post town: EASTLEIGH
- Postcode district: SO53
- Dialling code: 023
- Police: Hampshire and Isle of Wight
- Fire: Hampshire and Isle of Wight
- Ambulance: South Central
- UK Parliament: Eastleigh

Chandler's Ford (originally The Ford and historically Chandlersford) is a largely residential area and civil parish in the Borough of Eastleigh, in Hampshire, England. It had a population of 21,436 according to the 2011 Census.

Chandler's Ford lies on the old Winchester to Southampton road and the 'Ford' is thought to refer either to the ford of Monks Brook on the Hursley Road (shown on the Hursley map of 1588 as "Charnells foord") or on the Winchester-Southampton road. The Chandler's prefix was possibly added in the late 16th century, although there are numerous theories for the origin of the word.

The head offices of Draper Tools, B&Q, Utilita Energy, Selwood and Ahmad Tea are located in Chandler's Ford.

== History ==
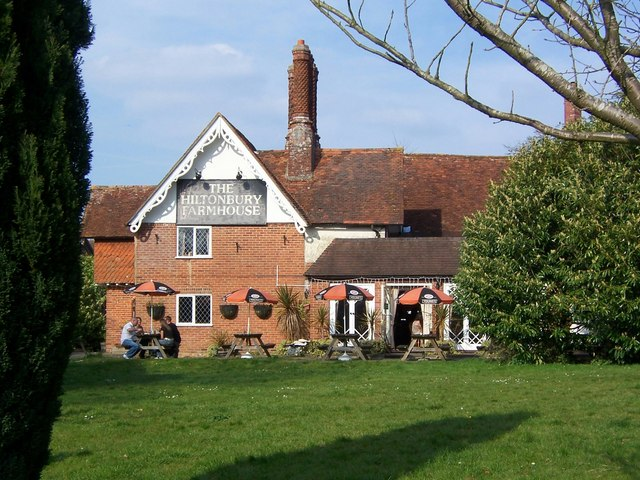
Hiltonbury Farmhouse

Hiltonbury Farm (now a public house) appeared on a map of 1588 and may originally have been owned by the Hursley Park Estate in nearby Hursley. It was later sold to Cranbury Park Estate and stopped being a working farm in the late 1970s, when the surrounding area was developed. Other communities revolved around other farms in the area but Chandler's Ford was very sparsely populated until the 19th century.

In the mid 19th century, Bell's brickfields was one of the biggest in England, producing 35 million bricks for the construction of the Royal Courts of Justice in The Strand.

In 1889, an iron church and some schools were constructed. The civil parish of Chandlersford was created in 1897, from portions of North Stoneham, North Baddesley and Ampfield, although the railway station remained in the North Baddesley parish.

In 1929, Herbert Collins, a well known Southampton based architect designed the Congregational Church in King's Road. This is now the United Reformed Church. The original building has been extended but the original style of the building remains.

Chandler's Ford used to be a town with mainly housing estates, however there are now various developments of shops and schools that have been built in the area. In the 1920s, building took place in the King's Court, Merdon and Hiltingbury areas. Later, development in the Hursley Road area happened, followed by housing across the Hiltingbury, Scantabout, Peverells Road, Spring Hill and Oakmount areas. More recently, developments in North Millers Dale, South Millers Dale and the new town of Valley Park to the west of the area have completed the mix of housing. Chandler's Ford is considered to be the development to the west of the M3 motorway and now forms the majority of the Eastleigh urban area.

Due to the development of the town, there is little identifiable town centre. The main commercial centre is in Fryern Arcade (built 1967), the area of the Halfway Inn (near the old tollhouse for Winchester-Southampton), but other smaller shopping areas include the Central Precinct and the area around St Boniface Church (built 1904). An Anglican church was added in Hiltingbury in the 1960s, with the Roman Catholic Church of St. Edward the Confessor and Methodist churches existing on the main Winchester-Southampton route.

Although a mainly residential area, Chandler's Ford has a significant industrial estate located mainly off School Lane and in between the B3043 – Bournemouth Road. The companies on the industrial estate now cover a wide variety of industries from light engineering and manufacturing, distribution, retail and outsourcing. A number of employers on the estate are of particular local interest. Peter Green Furnishers were once regarded as the biggest furniture and carpeting store in the whole of Hampshire. Selwoods is also another company of interest having been in the area since 1946 and with its head office on the corner of School Lane.

A library was constructed over two years starting in 1981.

In 2018, an Aldi supermarket opened in replacement of the old Homebase DIY store in the retail park on Chestnut Avenue - introducing new jobs and competition with Asda (located opposite on the main roundabout).

The area is represented by Compton and Chandler's Ford Cricket Club, which was formed in 1995 when Chandler's Ford Cricket Club (CC) merged with Compton and Shawford CC.

== Governance ==
The name Chandler's Ford is used for the civil parish, some (but not all) individual electoral wards, and sometimes a wider geographic area; the boundaries are not entirely consistent.

Chandler's Ford Parish Council, responsible for the most local matters, has 18 members elected from 5 wards (Chandler's Ford East & West, Hiltingbury East & West, Velmore).

Two wards on Eastleigh Borough Council, Chandler's Ford and Hiltingbury, cover most of the parish and lie fully within it. However Velmore is included in the Eastleigh South ward. Each ward elects 3 councillors.

On Hampshire County Council, the Chandler's Ford division includes most of the parish. But a significant portion, made up of the Chandlers Ford West and Velmore parish wards, is located in the Eastleigh South division. Each division elects one councillor.

The whole of Chandler's Ford parish is part of the Eastleigh parliamentary constituency.

Since the 1990s, Chandler's Ford elections have principally been contests between the Conservatives and Liberal Democrats. As at November 2024 all elected representatives from Chandler's Ford are Liberal Democrats. The Parish and Borough councils are both controlled by the Liberal Democrats. The County council is controlled by the Conservatives, although both representatives from Chandler's Ford are Liberal Democrats. The Eastleigh parliamentary constituency is represented by the Liberal Democrat Liz Jarvis.

Most of Valley Park, which is sometimes included in a wider area portrayal of Chandler's Ford, lies outside the parish, and forms part of Test Valley Borough, although is mainly within the Eastleigh parliamentary constituency.

== Demography ==
As of April 2011, the Chandler's Ford and Hiltingbury council wards (which form a continuous built-up area, and make up the main part of what is referred to as "Chandler's Ford") had a population of 21,436, across 8,896 households. The ethnicity of the population was mainly white, with 310 mixed race people, 937 Asian or Asian British people, 100 Black or Black British people and 224 in other ethnic groups. In 2001, 13,531 of the population were Christians, 5,528 professed no religion, and 1,477 did not state their religious beliefs. There were 59 Buddhists, 205 Hindus, 29 Jews, 263 Muslims, 289 Sikhs and 55 people of other religions living in the ward.

== Healthcare ==
Nuffield Health Wessex Hospital provides private and NHS services.

== Transport ==
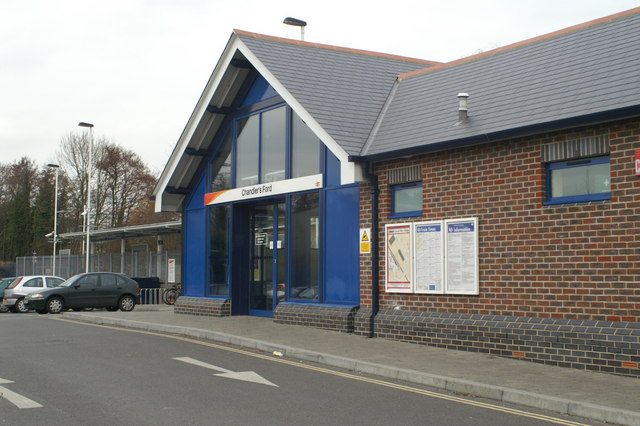
The railway station's entrance

Chandler's Ford railway station was reopened for passenger traffic on 18 May 2003, having been closed since 1969. South Western Railway operates an hourly service in each direction between Romsey and Salisbury, via Eastleigh and Southampton Central.

Bluestar's route 1 connects the area with Southampton and Winchester. Xelabus X6/X7 runs between Hiltingbury and Eastleigh and X5 connects Southampton Parkway and Chandlers Ford stations.

The M3 motorway runs past the eastern border of Chandler's Ford, with access from junction 12 from the north and junction 13 from the south.

== Crime ==
Chandler's Ford made national headlines in September 2007 when an armed bank robbery was foiled. On 13 September 2007, the Metropolitan Police's Flying Squad, in conjunction with the Hampshire Constabulary, foiled the robbery outside the HSBC bank in the central precinct on Winchester Road in Chandler's Ford. The police had been tipped off and hid behind the nearby toilet cubicles, before shooting dead two of the robbers. A third fled the scene by car and was later arrested.

There was a theft from the same bank on 24 January 2011, when a cash box was stolen from a security guard.

In 2026 it was reported that five teenagers had been stabbed at a Halloween party.

== Education ==
There are several schools and day nurseries in Chandler's Ford. Secondary schools include Thornden School and Toynbee School; colleges nearby include Barton Peveril College and Eastleigh College.

=== Day nurseries ===
- Kingsmead Day Nursery
- Sherborne House School
- Bright Horizons Day Nursery and Preschool

=== Infant and primary schools ===
- Chandler's Ford Infant School
- Fryern Infant School
- Hiltingbury Infant School
- Knightwood Primary School
- Scantabout Primary School
- Sherborne House School
- St Francis Church of England Primary School
- St. Swithun Wells R.C. Primary School

=== Junior schools ===
- Fryern Junior School
- Hiltingbury Junior School
- Merdon Junior School

=== Secondary schools ===
- Lakeside School (special school)
- Thornden Secondary School
- Toynbee Secondary School

=== Independent schools ===
- Sherborne House School

== Community ==
- Chandler's Ford Community Association Community Centre
- Hiltingbury Recreation Ground, Hiltingbury Road,
- Romsey, Chandler's Ford & District Round Table
- Valley Park Community Association

== See also ==
- List of places of worship in the Borough of Eastleigh
