= Thornden School =

Academy in Chandler's Ford, Hampshire, England

Coordinates: 50.995°N 1.365°W

- Thornden School Logo

Location
- Winchester Road; Chandler's Ford, Hampshire, SO53 2DW; England

Information
- Type: Academy
- Specialists: Arts, science
- Department for Education URN: 136715 Tables
- Ofsted: Reports
- Head teacher: Caroline Lowing
- Staff: 95 as of July 2016
- Gender: Mixed
- Age: 11 to 16
- Enrolment: 1460 as of 6 September 2023
- Colours: Black, White and Purple Tartan
- Website: http://www.thornden.hants.sch.uk/

Thornden School is a secondary school with academy status in Chandlers Ford, Hampshire. It is an 11-16 (no sixth form), mixed specialist Arts College with Science as the second specialism. There are 1400 pupils on roll and 11 tutor groups of around 30 pupils in each tutor group, to form year groups of around 300 people.

== Subjects ==
The following subjects are taught at Thornden School: Art, Business and Economics, Engineering, Dance, Drama, Design and Technology GCSE, English, Geography, History, ICT, Mathematics, Modern Foreign Languages (MFL), Music, Physical Education, Computer Science, Religious Education and Science.

== Classes ==
In Year 9, pupils choose their options for GCSE. At Thornden, all pupils are strongly advised to select at least one modern foreign language from either French or Spanish. Some pupils may take up a second language for Year 9, which was usually Spanish prior to its introduction at Year 7. The school used to offer a German Language course, but due to staff shortages, the course stopped receiving new students starting the academic year 2024.

== Staff ==
There are 104 members of staff at Thornden School. Patrick Earnshaw is the Executive Headteacher of Thornden and the HISP Multi-Academy Trust, taking over from Steve Hicks after an "incident between students".

== Productions ==
As Thornden is a performing Arts College, many productions take place inside Thornden Hall involving Thornden Pupils and the wider community. The Thornden Operatic and Musical Society have performed dozens of musicals.

== Academic performance ==
The most recent inspection was in June 2022, in which the school received a 'Good' rating OFSTED. The report cited students' concerns over complaints of bullying not being adequately addressed by staff and inconsistent attention to detail in safeguarding records. The report also found that teachers sometimes do not check that students' learning has been successfully embedded.

Prior to the June 2022 Ofsted inspection, Thornden School had been consistently rated 'Outstanding', although a full inspection had not taken place since 2007.

== Thornden Hall ==
Thornden Hall is part of a performing arts centre, which was awarded a Commendation in the Civic Trust Awards 2005. Thornden Hall was opened in May 2003 in the presence of percussionist Evelyn Glennie. It is a concert hall designed with acoustics for music performances, with a stage large enough to accommodate a full orchestra and an audience capacity of 388 people. The venue can be adapted for other dance and drama events, presentations and lectures. In addition to the concert hall there are two specialist drama studios, two music rooms and a dance studio, as well as foyer and bar area.

Thornden Hall is the home of the Hampshire County Youth Orchestra, Eastleigh Area Schools Orchestra, Thornden Community Wind Band, TOMS, Hampshire County Youth Orchestra, Stagecoach Theatre Arts, and Tribe Community Arts, who all rehearse or hold classes in the performing arts centre throughout the week. The concert hall is also used for meetings and presentations.

In 2021, building work was completed on Thornden Hall following three years forced closure, after it suffered major roof damage when one of the roof beams was split. The Hall itself has also been upgraded.

== Fire ==
In December 2002 there was a fire at the school which caused extensive damage to the food and textiles rooms. It also damaged the maths classrooms above. The fire spread rapidly through a wing of the building and took 50 fire fighters from four areas three hours to bring under control. Temporary classrooms were used during repair work, including huts. Two teenagers, aged 16 and 17, were charged with arson in connection with the fire which severely damaged the school. The school was closed for two days as a result.

== Notable alumni ==
- Bob Dibden, from Urban Hype, known for the June 1992 A Trip to Trumpton, known as Toytown techno
- Kenya Grace, British singer songwriter best known for 'Strangers', which reached number one in the UK singles chart
- Caity Baser, British singer songwriter
