= 2025–26 Women's Super League =

Women's Super League
- Season: 2025–26
- Dates: 5 September 2025 – 16 May 2026
- Champions: Manchester City; 2nd title
- Relegated: Leicester City
- Champions League: Manchester City; Arsenal; Chelsea
- Matches: 132
- Goals: 392 (2.97 per match)
- Top goalscorer: Khadija Shaw (21 goals)
- Best goalkeeper: Hannah Hampton (8 clean sheets)
- Biggest home win: Arsenal 7–0 Leicester City (29 April 2026)
- Biggest away win: West Ham United 1–5 Arsenal (12 September 2025); London City Lionesses 1–5 Manchester United (14 September 2025); Tottenham Hotspur 1–5 Manchester City (19 September 2025); West Ham United 0–4 Chelsea (28 September 2025); Aston Villa 3–7 Tottenham Hotspur (15 February 2026)
- Highest scoring: Aston Villa 3–7 Tottenham Hotspur (15 February 2026)
- Longest winning run: 13 games Manchester City
- Longest unbeaten run: 17 games Arsenal
- Longest winless run: 12 games Liverpool
- Longest losing run: 11 games Leicester City
- Highest attendance: 56,537; Arsenal 1–1 Chelsea (8 November 2025)
- Lowest attendance: 1,404; Leicester City 1–2 Tottenham Hotspur (28 September 2025)

The 2025–26 Women's Super League was the 15th season of the Women's Super League (WSL) since it was formed in 2010. It was the seventh season after the rebranding of the four highest levels of women's football in England. The season began on 5 September 2025 and ended on 16 May 2026.

On 16 June 2025, it was announced that the WSL would be expanding to 14 teams from the 2026–27 season. As a result, the 2025–26 WSL2 season promoted two teams (Birmingham City and Crystal Palace), while the bottom WSL team, Leicester City, played in a promotion/relegation play-off against the 3rd placed WSL2 side, Charlton Athletic, on 23 May 2026. A loss on penalties saw Leicester City relegated after a five-year stint in the division.

Chelsea entered the season as defending champions, having won their sixth consecutive and eighth overall title the previous season. However, they were dethroned after six years by Manchester City, who won their first WSL title in a decade (since 2016) and their second overall.

== Teams ==
Locations of the 2025–26 WSL teams outside of London
Locations of the 2025–26 WSL teams in London

Twelve teams contested the 2025–26 Women's Super League season. London City Lionesses were confirmed as 2024–25 Women's Championship champions on the final day of competition. They replaced Crystal Palace, who were relegated on 27 April 2025, with two games remaining in the season.

Team	Location	Ground	Capacity	2024–25 season
Arsenal	London (Holloway)	Emirates Stadium	60,704	2nd
Aston Villa	Birmingham (Aston)	Villa Park	42,640	6th
Brighton & Hove Albion	Crawley	Broadfield Stadium (Note: Some matches to be played at Falmer Stadium.)	6,134	5th
Chelsea	London (Kingston upon Thames)	Kingsmeadow (Note: Some matches to be played at Stamford Bridge.)	4,850	1st
Everton	Liverpool (Walton)	Goodison Park	39,414	8th
Leicester City	Leicester	King Power Stadium	32,212	10th
Liverpool	St Helens	BrewDog Stadium (Note: Three matches to be played at Anfield.)	18,000	7th
London City Lionesses	London (Bromley)	Hayes Lane	5,000	WC, 1st
Manchester City	Manchester (Bradford)	Academy Stadium (Note: Some matches to be played at City of Manchester Stadium.)	7,000	4th
Manchester United	Leigh	Leigh Sports Village (Note: Some matches to be played at Old Trafford.)	12,000	3rd
Tottenham Hotspur	London (Leyton)	Brisbane Road (Note: Three matches to be played at Tottenham Hotspur Stadium.)	9,271	11th
West Ham United	London (Dagenham)	Victoria Road	6,078	9th

=== Personnel and kits ===
Team	Manager	Captain	Kit manufacturer	Shirt sponsor	Shirt sponsor (sleeve)	Shirt sponsor (back)	Shorts sponsor
Arsenal	(Netherlands) Renée Slegers	(Scotland) Kim Little	Adidas	Fly Emirates	Visit Rwanda	None	None
Aston Villa	(Spain) Natalia Arroyo	(England) Rachel Daly	Adidas	IWG Women & Sport	Trade Nation	None	None
Brighton & Hove Albion	(Australia) Dario Vidošić	(England) Maisie Symonds	Nike	American Express	Experience Kissimmee	None	None
Chelsea	(France) Sonia Bompastor	(England) Millie Bright	Nike	IFS.ai	FPT	Škoda	Here We Flo
Everton	(England) Scott Phelan (interim)	(England) Megan Finnigan	Castore	Stake.com	Christopher Ward	None	GGM Gastro
Leicester City	(England) Rick Passmoor	(England) Sam Tierney	Adidas	King Power	Bia Saigon	None	None
Liverpool	(Wales) Gareth Taylor	(England) Grace Fisk	Adidas	Standard Chartered	Expedia	None	None
London City Lionesses	(Spain) Eder Maestre	(Sweden) Kosovare Asllani	Nike	Everyone Watches Women's Sports	None	None	None
Manchester City	(Sweden) Andrée Jeglertz	(England) Alex Greenwood	Puma	Etihad Airways	OKX	Revolut	Joie
Manchester United	(England) Marc Skinner	(England) Maya Le Tissier	Adidas	Snapdragon	DXC Technology	None	None
Tottenham Hotspur	(England) Martin Ho	Bethany England	Nike	AIA	Cinch	e.l.f.	None
West Ham United	(Italy) Rita Guarino	(Australia) Katrina Gorry	Umbro	BoyleSports	QuickBooks	Paul Robinson Solicitors	Modibodi

=== Managerial changes ===
Team	Outgoing manager	Manner of departure	Date of vacancy	Position in table	Incoming manager	Date of appointment
Liverpool	(England) Amber Whiteley	End of interim period	10 May 2025	Pre season	(Wales) Gareth Taylor	8 August 2025
Manchester City	(England) Nick Cushing	End of interim period	10 May 2025	Pre season	(Sweden) Andrée Jeglertz	3 July 2025
Tottenham Hotspur	(Sweden) Robert Vilahamn	Sacked	8 June 2025	Pre season	(England) Martin Ho	4 July 2025
Leicester City	(France) Amandine Miquel	Sacked	28 August 2025	Pre season	(England) Rick Passmoor (Note: Passmoor was initially appointed as an interim manager, but the move was made permanent on 10 October 2025.)	4 September 2025
West Ham United	(England) Rehanne Skinner	Sacked	18 December 2025	11th	(Italy) Rita Guarino	22 December 2025
London City Lionesses	(France) Jocelyn Prêcheur	Sacked	21 December 2025	6th	(Spain) Eder Maestre	2 January 2026
Everton	(Denmark) Brian Sørensen	Sacked	4 February 2026	9th	(England) Scott Phelan (Note: Phelan was initially appointed as an interim manager, but the move was made permanent on 23 June 2026.)	4 February 2026

== League table ==
Pos	Team	Pld	W	D	L	GF	GA	GD	Pts	Qualification or relegation
1	Manchester City (C)	22	18	1	3	62	19	+43	55	Qualification for the Champions League league phase
2	Arsenal	22	15	6	1	53	14	+39	51	Qualification for the Champions League league phase
3	Chelsea	22	15	4	3	44	20	+24	49	Qualification for the Champions League third qualifying round
4	Manchester United	22	11	7	4	38	22	+16	40	
5	Tottenham Hotspur	22	11	3	8	35	38	−3	36	
6	London City Lionesses	22	8	3	11	28	35	−7	27	
7	Brighton & Hove Albion	22	7	5	10	27	28	−1	26	
8	Everton	22	7	2	13	25	37	−12	23	
9	Aston Villa	22	5	5	12	28	48	−20	20	
10	West Ham United	22	5	4	13	20	45	−25	19	
11	Liverpool	22	4	5	13	21	34	−13	17	
12	Leicester City (R)	22	2	3	17	11	52	−41	9	Consigned to relegation play-off

Source: WSL League Table
Rules for classification: 1) Points; 2) Goal difference; 3) Number of goals scored.
(C) Champions; (R) Relegated

== Matches ==
Home \ Away	ARS	AVL	BHA	CHE	EVE	LEI	LIV	LCL	MCI	MUN	TOT	WHU
Arsenal		1–1	1–0	1–1	1–0	7–0	2–1	4–1	1–0	0–0	5–2	5–0
Aston Villa	0–3		2–1	1–3	3–3	0–0	3–0	1–3	0–0	1–4	3–7	0–2
Brighton & Hove Albion	1–1	0–0		0–3	1–0	4–1	0–0	1–2	3–2	2–3	1–2	4–1
Chelsea	0–2	4–3	2–1		0–1	1–0	2–0	2–0	2–1	1–0	1–0	5–0
Everton	1–3	2–1	0–1	1–4		1–0	2–3	1–2	1–2	1–4	0–2	1–0
Leicester City	1–4	1–2	0–1	1–3	1–1		1–0	1–0	0–3	0–2	1–2	1–2
Liverpool	1–3	4–1	1–1	1–1	1–4	2–0		0–0	1–2	0–2	2–0	0–1
London City Lionesses	0–2	2–1	0–1	1–1	0–1	5–1	1–0		1–2	1–5	4–2	1–0
Manchester City	3–2	6–1	2–1	5–1	2–0	6–0	1–0	4–1		3–0	5–2	1–0
Manchester United	0–0	0–1	1–1	1–1	2–1	4–0	3–1	2–1	0–3		3–3	2–1
Tottenham Hotspur	0–0	2–1	1–0	0–2	1–2	1–0	2–1	2–1	1–5	0–0		1–0
West Ham United	1–5	0–2	3–2	0–4	3–1	1–1	2–2	1–1	1–4	0–0	1–2	

Source: Women's Super League Results and Fixtures
Legend: Blue = home team win; Yellow = draw; Red = away team win.

== Relegation play-off ==
23 May 2026
12:30 BST

Charlton Athletic	0–0 (a.e.t.)	Leicester City
	Report
Penalties
Bradley (penalty missed); Thestrup (penalty scored); Fitzgerald (penalty missed); Mason (penalty scored)	2–1	(penalty missed) Van Egmond; (penalty missed) O'Brien; (penalty scored) McLoughlin; (penalty missed) Payne; (penalty missed) Mouchon

The Valley, Charlton
Attendance: 3,979
Referee: Emily Heaslip

== Season statistics ==
=== Top scorers ===
Rank	Player	Club	Goals
1	(Jamaica) Khadija Shaw	Manchester City	21
2	(England) Alessia Russo	Arsenal	13
3	(Scotland) Kirsty Hanson	Aston Villa	12
4	(Sweden) Stina Blackstenius	Arsenal	10
4	(Netherlands) Vivianne Miedema	Manchester City	10
6	(Brazil) Kerolin	Manchester City	9
7	(Denmark) Olivia Holdt	Tottenham Hotspur	8
7	(Japan) Kiko Seike	Brighton & Hove Albion	8
9	Bethany England	Tottenham Hotspur	7
9	(Australia) Sam Kerr	Chelsea	7
9	(United States) Alyssa Thompson	Chelsea	7

=== Clean sheets ===
Rank	Player	Club	Clean sheets
1	(England) Hannah Hampton	Chelsea	8
2	(United States) Phallon Tullis-Joyce	Manchester United	7
2	(Japan) Ayaka Yamashita	Manchester City	7
4	(Germany) Anneke Borbe	Arsenal	6
4	(Netherlands) Lize Kop	Tottenham Hotspur	6
4	(Nigeria) Chiamaka Nnadozie	Brighton & Hove Albion	6
7	(Canada) Sabrina D'Angelo	Aston Villa	5
7	(Netherlands) Daphne van Domselaar	Arsenal	5
9	(Republic of Ireland) Courtney Brosnan	Everton	4
9	(Sweden) Jennifer Falk	Liverpool	4

=== Hat-tricks ===
Player	For	Against	Result	Date	Ref.
(Spain) Ornella Vignola	Everton	Liverpool	4–1 (A)	7 September 2025	
(Jamaica) Khadija Shaw^{4}	Manchester City	Aston Villa	6–1 (H)	14 December 2025	
(Brazil) Kerolin	Manchester City	Chelsea	5–1 (H)	1 February 2026	
(Jamaica) Khadija Shaw	Manchester City	Tottenham Hotspur	5–2 (H)	21 March 2026	
(England) Chloe Kelly	Arsenal	West Ham United	5–0 (H)	21 March 2026	
(England) Alessia Russo	Arsenal	Tottenham Hotspur	5–2 (H)	28 March 2026	

(H) – Home; (A) – Away
^{4} – Player scored four goals.

=== Discipline ===
	Most yellow cards	Total	Most red cards	Total	Ref.
Player	(Sweden) Amanda Nildén (Tottenham Hotspur) (England) Sam Tierney (Leicester City)	7	(Algeria) Inès Belloumou (West Ham United) (England) Gemma Bonner (Liverpool) (France) Océane Deslandes (Aston Villa) (England) Grace Fisk (Liverpool) (England) Shannon O'Brien (Leicester City) (Canada) Jayde Riviere (Manchester United) (Jamaica) Drew Spence (Tottenham Hotspur)	1	
Club	Brighton & Hove Albion	38	Liverpool	2	

== Awards ==
=== Monthly awards ===
Month	Manager of the Month		Player of the Month		Goal of the Month		Save of the Month		Ref.
Month	Manager	Club	Player	Club	Player	Club	Player	Club	Ref.
September	(France) Sonia Bompastor	Chelsea	(England) Aggie Beever-Jones	Chelsea	(Canada) Olivia Smith	Arsenal	(Germany) Janina Leitzig	Leicester City	
October	(Sweden) Andrée Jeglertz	Manchester City	(England) Jess Park	Manchester United	(Scotland) Kirsty Hanson	Aston Villa	(Netherlands) Daphne van Domselaar	Arsenal	
November	(Sweden) Andrée Jeglertz	Manchester City	(Netherlands) Kerstin Casparij	Manchester City	(United States) Alyssa Thompson	Chelsea	(Nigeria) Chiamaka Nnadozie	Brighton & Hove Albion	
December	(Sweden) Andrée Jeglertz	Manchester City	(Jamaica) Khadija Shaw	Manchester City	(Germany) Shekiera Martinez	West Ham United	(Spain) Elene Lete	London City Lionesses	
January	(Wales) Gareth Taylor	Liverpool	(Scotland) Kim Little	Arsenal	(England) Jess Park	Manchester United	(Germany) Anneke Borbe	Arsenal	
February	(England) Martin Ho	Tottenham Hotspur	(Brazil) Kerolin	Manchester City	(England) Jess Park	Manchester United	(Japan) Ayaka Yamashita	Manchester City	
March	(Netherlands) Renée Slegers	Arsenal	(England) Alessia Russo	Arsenal	(Finland) Oona Siren	West Ham United	(Netherlands) Daphne van Domselaar	Arsenal	

=== Annual awards ===
Award	Winner	Club
Barclays WSL Player of the Season	(Jamaica) Khadija Shaw	Manchester City
Barclays WSL Manager of the Season	(France) Sonia Bompastor	Chelsea
Barclays WSL Goal of the Season	(Scotland) Kirsty Hanson (vs. West Ham)	Aston Villa
Barclays WSL Rising Star	(Netherlands) Veerle Buurman	Chelsea
PFA Women's Players' Player of the Year	(Jamaica) Khadija Shaw	Manchester City
PFA Women's Young Player of the Year	(Canada) Olivia Smith	Arsenal
FWA Footballer of the Year	(Jamaica) Khadija Shaw	Manchester City

PFA Team of the Year
Goalkeeper	(England) Hannah Hampton (Chelsea)			
Defenders	(Netherlands) Kerstin Casparij (Manchester City)	(Japan) Tōko Koga (Tottenham Hotspur)	(Australia) Ellie Carpenter (Chelsea)	(United States) Emily Fox (Arsenal)
Midfielders	(Japan) Yui Hasegawa (Manchester City)		(Spain) Mariona Caldentey (Arsenal)	(England) Jess Park (Manchester United)
Forwards	(Jamaica) Khadija Shaw (Manchester City)		(England) Alessia Russo (Arsenal)	(England) Lauren James (Chelsea)
