= 2026–27 Women's Super League =

Women's Super League
- Season: 2026–27
- Dates: 4 September 2026 – 23 May 2027
- Matches: 77
- Goals: 236 (3.06 per match)
- Top goalscorer: Khadija Shaw (13 goals)
- Best goalkeeper: Hannah Hampton (7 clean sheets)
- Biggest home win: Manchester City 5–0 West Ham United (7 November 2026)
- Biggest away win: Crystal Palace 0–7 Tottenham Hotspur (20 September 2026)
- Highest scoring: Chelsea 6–2 Tottenham Hotspur (18 October 2026); London City Lionesses 6–2 Crystal Palace (21 November 2026)
- Longest winning run: 7 games Chelsea
- Longest unbeaten run: 11 games Chelsea
- Longest winless run: 11 games Charlton Athletic
- Longest losing run: 10 games Charlton Athletic
- Highest attendance: 32,588; Arsenal 1–1 London City Lionesses (15 November 2026)
- Lowest attendance: 1,004; Crystal Palace 3–2 Charlton Athletic (8 November 2026)
- All statistics correct as of 22 November 2026.

The 2026–27 Women's Super League is the 16th season of the Women's Super League (WSL) since it was formed in 2010. It is the eighth season after the rebranding of the four highest levels of women's football in England.

Manchester City are the defending champions.

As part of the league's rebrand, a new trophy will be introduced for the 2026–27 season. As of September 2026, the trophy has not been unveiled.

== Teams ==
Locations of the 2026–27 WSL teams outside of London
Locations of the 2026–27 WSL teams in London

Fourteen teams are contesting the 2026–27 Women's Super League season, an increase of two teams after a league expansion was announced in June 2025. Birmingham City and Crystal Palace were promoted as the 2025–26 Women's Super League 2 winners and runners-up, respectively. Birmingham City returned to the top flight after being relegated at the end of the 2021–22 season, while Crystal Palace returned after one season in the WSL 2.

There was a one-game play-off between Leicester City (twelfth-placed WSL team) and Charlton Athletic (third-placed WSL 2 team) on 23 May 2026, to decide the fourteenth team. Charlton were the eventual winners on penalties and made their WSL debut, returning to the English women's top tier after an 18-year absence since being relegated from the old FA Women's Premier League National Division in 2007–08.

| Team | Location | Ground | Capacity | 2025–26 season |
|---|---|---|---|---|
| Arsenal | London (Holloway) | Emirates Stadium | 60,704 | 2nd |
| Aston Villa | Birmingham (Aston) | Villa Park | 42,640 | 9th |
| Birmingham City | Birmingham (Bordesley) | St Andrew's | 29,902 | WSL 2, 1st |
| Brighton & Hove Albion | Crawley | Broadfield Stadium (Note: Four matches due to be played at Falmer Stadium.) | 6,134 | 7th |
| Charlton Athletic | London (Charlton) | The Valley | 27,111 | WSL 2, 3rd |
| Chelsea | London (Fulham) | Stamford Bridge | 40,044 | 3rd |
| Crystal Palace | London (Sutton) | 360 Engage Stadium | 7,032 | WSL 2, 2nd |
| Everton | Liverpool (Walton) | Goodison Park | 39,414 | 8th |
| Liverpool | St Helens | BrewDog Stadium (Note: Some matches to be played at Anfield.) | 18,000 | 11th |
| London City Lionesses | London (Bromley) | Hayes Lane | 5,000 | 6th |
| Manchester City | Manchester (Bradford) | Academy Stadium (Note: Some matches to be played at Etihad Stadium.) | 7,000 | 1st |
| Manchester United | Leigh | Leigh Sports Village (Note: Some matches to be played at Old Trafford.) | 12,000 | 4th |
| Tottenham Hotspur | London (Leyton) | Brisbane Road (Note: Some matches to be played at Tottenham Hotspur Stadium.) | 9,271 | 5th |
| West Ham United | London (Dagenham) | Victoria Road | 6,078 | 10th |

=== Personnel and kits ===
| Team | Manager | Captain | Kit manufacturer | Shirt sponsor | Shirt sponsor (sleeve) | Shirt sponsor (back) | Shorts sponsor |
|---|---|---|---|---|---|---|---|
| Arsenal | (Netherlands) Renée Slegers | (Scotland) Kim Little | Adidas | Fly Emirates | Deel | None | None |
| Aston Villa | (Denmark) Brian Sørensen (interim) | (Republic of Ireland) Anna Patten | Adidas | Visit Rwanda | None | None | None |
| Birmingham City | (England) Amy Merricks | (England) Millie Turner | Nike | Coral | None | None | None |
| Brighton & Hove Albion | (Spain) Arturo Ruiz | (England) Maisie Symonds | Nike | American Express | Experience Kissimmee | Pinterest | None |
| Charlton Athletic | (England) Karen Hills | (England) Kiera Skeels | Reebok | RSK Group | Christopher Ward | TodayTix | None |
| Chelsea | (France) Sonia Bompastor | (Scotland) Erin Cuthbert | Nike | Circle Internet Group | None | Škoda | Here We Flo |
| Crystal Palace | (England) Jo Potter | (England) Aimee Everett | Macron | Temporal.io | Tsakos Energy Navigation | None | None |
| Everton | (England) Scott Phelan | (England) Megan Finnigan | Castore | CMC Markets | Stake.com | None | GGM Gastro |
| Liverpool | (Wales) Gareth Taylor | (England) Grace Fisk | Adidas | Standard Chartered | Expedia | LFC Foundation | None |
| London City Lionesses | (Spain) Eder Maestre | (Spain) Alexia Putellas | Nike | Nike | None | None | None |
| Manchester City | (Sweden) Andrée Jeglertz | (England) Alex Greenwood | Puma | Etihad Airways | OKX | Revolut | Joie |
| Manchester United | (Spain) Eva Olid | (England) Maya Le Tissier | Adidas | Snapdragon | None | Microsoft Surface | None |
| Tottenham Hotspur | (England) Martin Ho | (Jamaica) Drew Spence | Nike | AIA | Kraken | e.l.f. | None |
| West Ham United | (Italy) Rita Guarino | (England) Katie Zelem | New Balance | BoyleSports | Lilley Plummer Risks | Paul Robinson Solicitors | None |

=== Managerial changes ===
| Team | Outgoing manager | Manner of departure | Date of vacancy | Position in table | Incoming manager | Date of appointment |
|---|---|---|---|---|---|---|
| Manchester United | (England) Marc Skinner | Mutual agreement | 3 August 2026 | Pre season | (Spain) Eva Olid | 5 August 2026 |
| Brighton & Hove Albion | (Australia) Dario Vidošić | Resigned | 28 August 2026 | Pre season | (Spain) Arturo Ruiz | 28 August 2026 |
| Aston Villa | (Spain) Natalia Arroyo | Sacked | 28 September 2026 | 13th | (Denmark) Brian Sørensen (interim) | 28 September 2026 |

== League table ==
| Pos | Team | Pld | W | D | L | GF | GA | GD | Pts | Qualification or relegation |
|---|---|---|---|---|---|---|---|---|---|---|
| 1 | Chelsea | 11 | 8 | 3 | 0 | 29 | 5 | +24 | 27 | Qualification for the Champions League league phase |
| 2 | Manchester City | 11 | 8 | 1 | 2 | 28 | 14 | +14 | 25 | Qualification for the Champions League league phase |
| 3 | London City Lionesses | 11 | 7 | 2 | 2 | 31 | 14 | +17 | 23 | Qualification for the Champions League third qualifying round |
| 4 | Manchester United | 11 | 6 | 3 | 2 | 14 | 12 | +2 | 21 | |
| 5 | Tottenham Hotspur | 11 | 6 | 2 | 3 | 28 | 19 | +9 | 20 | |
| 6 | Arsenal | 11 | 3 | 6 | 2 | 11 | 11 | 0 | 15 | |
| 7 | Brighton & Hove Albion | 11 | 4 | 2 | 5 | 17 | 16 | +1 | 14 | |
| 8 | Aston Villa | 11 | 3 | 5 | 3 | 12 | 17 | −5 | 14 | |
| 9 | West Ham United | 11 | 4 | 1 | 6 | 11 | 19 | −8 | 13 | |
| 10 | Liverpool | 11 | 3 | 3 | 5 | 17 | 16 | +1 | 12 | |
| 11 | Everton | 11 | 3 | 3 | 5 | 8 | 11 | −3 | 12 | |
| 12 | Crystal Palace | 11 | 2 | 3 | 6 | 12 | 27 | −15 | 9 | |
| 13 | Birmingham City | 11 | 1 | 3 | 7 | 12 | 24 | −12 | 6 | Qualification for WSL2 promotion/relegation play-off |
| 14 | Charlton Athletic | 11 | 0 | 1 | 10 | 6 | 31 | −25 | 1 | Relegation to the WSL2 |

Updated to match(es) played on 22 November 2026. Source: Women's Super League Table
Rules for classification: 1) Points; 2) Goal difference; 3) Number of goals scored.

== Results ==
| Home \ Away | ARS | AVL | BIR | BHA | CHA | CHE | CRY | EVE | LIV | LCL | MCI | MUN | TOT | WHU |
|---|---|---|---|---|---|---|---|---|---|---|---|---|---|---|
| Arsenal | | 1–1 | 1–1 | 10 Jan | 22 May | 28 Mar | 0–0 | 4 Apr | 21 Jan | 1–1 | 30 Jan | 1–1 | 13 Mar | 0–0 |
| Aston Villa | 17 Mar | | 1–0 | 14 Feb | 7 Feb | 2 May | 1–1 | 10 Jan | 2–1 | 19 Dec | 1–4 | 0–1 | 24 Jan | 9 May |
| Birmingham City | 7 Feb | 31 Jan | | 2–2 | 1–0 | 13 Mar | 3–3 | 9 May | 13 Dec | 28 Mar | 20 Jan | 1–2 | 1–4 | 4 Apr |
| Brighton & Hove Albion | 0–1 | 1–1 | 24 Jan | | 5–1 | 19 Dec | 2–1 | 7 Feb | 0–3 | 17 Mar | 4 Apr | 22 May | 20 Jan | 3–0 |
| Charlton Athletic | 20 Dec | 1–1 | 10 Jan | 28 Mar | | 0–6 | 31 Jan | 17 Mar | 0–4 | 1–4 | 0–1 | 1–3 | 9 May | 14 Feb |
| Chelsea | 1–0 | 1–1 | 2–0 | 9 May | 20 Jan | | 24 Jan | 1–1 | 7 Feb | 12 Dec | 1–0 | 4 Apr | 6–2 | 17 Mar |
| Crystal Palace | 14 Feb | 20 Jan | 17 Mar | 2 May | 3–2 | 1–3 | | 1–0 | 9 May | 7 Feb | 13 Dec | 10 Jan | 0–7 | 0–1 |
| Everton | 11 Dec | 2–3 | 2–1 | 0–1 | 1–0 | 22 May | 14 Mar | | 28 Mar | 20 Jan | 30 Apr | 0–0 | 14 Feb | 31 Jan |
| Liverpool | 1–2 | 4 Apr | 14 Feb | 31 Jan | 2 May | 0–0 | 20 Dec | 2–0 | | 2–2 | 22 May | 17 Mar | 1–1 | 24 Jan |
| London City Lionesses | 24 Jan | 22 May | 4–1 | 2–0 | 4 Apr | 14 Feb | 6–2 | 2–1 | 14 Mar | | 1–2 | 2–1 | 2 May | 10 Jan |
| Manchester City | 4–2 | 14 Mar | 3–1 | 3–2 | 24 Jan | 10 Jan | 27 Mar | 20 Dec | 4–2 | 9 May | | 14 Feb | 1–3 | 5–0 |
| Manchester United | 9 May | 28 Mar | 2 May | 13 Dec | 14 Mar | 0–5 | 2–0 | 24 Jan | 1–0 | 31 Jan | 1–1 | | 20 Dec | 2–1 |
| Tottenham Hotspur | 1–2 | 4–0 | 22 May | 2–1 | 11 Dec | 31 Jan | 4 Apr | 0–0 | 10 Jan | 1–6 | 17 Mar | 7 Feb | | 3–1 |
| West Ham United | 2 May | 13 Dec | 20 Dec | 14 Mar | 2–0 | 0–3 | 22 May | 0–1 | 4–1 | 2–1 | 7 Feb | 20 Jan | 28 Mar | |

Updated to match(es) played on 22 November 2026. Source: Results and Fixtures
Legend: Blue = home team win; Yellow = draw; Red = away team win.

== Season statistics ==
As of 22 November 2026

=== Top scorers ===
| Rank | Player | Club | Goals |
|---|---|---|---|
| 1 | (Jamaica) Khadija Shaw | Manchester City | 13 |
| 2 | (France) Viviane Asseyi | West Ham United | 7 |
| 2 | (France) Océane Hurtré | Birmingham City | 7 |
| 4 | (France) Melvine Malard | Chelsea | 6 |
| 4 | (Netherlands) Victoria Pelova | Tottenham Hotspur | 6 |
| 6 | (Netherlands) Daniëlle van de Donk | London City Lionesses | 5 |
| 6 | (England) Lauren Hemp | Manchester City | 5 |
| 6 | (Denmark) Olivia Holdt | Tottenham Hotspur | 5 |
| 6 | (Sweden) Beata Olsson | Liverpool | 5 |
| 6 | (Spain) Alexia Putellas | London City Lionesses | 5 |
| 6 | (England) Alessia Russo | Arsenal | 5 |

=== Clean sheets ===
| Rank | Player | Club | Clean sheets |
|---|---|---|---|
| 1 | (England) Hannah Hampton | Chelsea | 7 |
| 2 | (Republic of Ireland) Courtney Brosnan | Everton | 4 |
| 2 | (England) Khiara Keating | Liverpool | 4 |
| 2 | (United States) Phallon Tullis-Joyce | Manchester United | 4 |
| 4 | (Netherlands) Lize Kop | Tottenham Hotspur | 3 |
| 4 | (France) Constance Picaud | West Ham United | 3 |
| 7 | (Nigeria) Chiamaka Nnadozie | Brighton & Hove Albion | 2 |
| 7 | (France) Pauline Peyraud-Magnin | Crystal Palace | 2 |
| 7 | (Spain) Misa Rodríguez | Arsenal | 2 |
| 10 | 6 players | | 1 |

=== Hat-tricks ===
| Player | For | Against | Result | Date | Ref. |
|---|---|---|---|---|---|
| (Denmark) Olivia Holdt | Tottenham Hotspur | Crystal Palace | 7–0 (A) | 20 September 2026 | |
| (Jamaica) Khadija Shaw | Manchester City | West Ham United | 5–0 (H) | 7 November 2026 | |

(H) – Home; (A) – Away

=== Discipline ===
| | Most yellow cards | Total | Most red cards | Total | Ref. |
|---|---|---|---|---|---|
| Player | (England) Ruby Mace (Everton) (Spain) Andrea Medina (Manchester United) (Sweden) Julia Zigiotti (Manchester United) | 4 | (France) Hawa Cissoko (Charlton Athletic) (France) Océane Deslandes (Aston Villa) (England) Ashleigh Neville (Charlton Athletic) (Japan) Fūka Tsunoda (Crystal Palace) (Japan) Ayaka Yamashita (Manchester City) | 1 | |
| Club | Tottenham Hotspur | 22 | Charlton Athletic | 2 | |

== Awards ==
=== Monthly awards ===
| Month | Manager of the Month | | Player of the Month | | Goal of the Month | | Save of the Month | | Ref. |
| Month | Manager | Club | Player | Club | Player | Club | Player | Club | Ref. |
|---|---|---|---|---|---|---|---|---|---|
| September | (England) Martin Ho | Tottenham Hotspur | (France) Océane Hurtré | Birmingham City | (England) Jodie Hutton | Charlton Athletic | (United States) Phallon Tullis-Joyce | Manchester United | |
| October | (France) Sonia Bompastor | Chelsea | (England) Lauren Hemp | Manchester City | (England) Maisie Symonds | Brighton & Hove Albion | (Spain) Elene Lete | London City Lionesses | |
