= The Pilgrims F.C. =

English football club

The Pilgrims
- Full name: The Pilgrims Football Club
- Founded: 1905
- Dissolved: 1910
- Ground: none
First choice colours

The Pilgrims was a touring association football side extant during the early 1900s.

== History ==
The Pilgrims was formed as an amateur representative touring team and had no connection with the club of the same name that entered the FA Cup earlier. Its first appearance was in 1905, founded in response to a request from Sir Charles Fitzpatrick while he was in the United Kingdom, and sailing with him from Liverpool to Newfoundland in August.

The Times has regular accounts of 'The Pilgrims' including tours of the US and Canada in 1905 and the US in 1909 led by Fred Milnes, a Sheffield-based amateur player, with them hosting reciprocal US visits. In 1929 the Lord Mayor of London was reported as having presided at a dinner given by The Pilgrims to a visiting team from Worcester, Massachusetts.
