= Everyone Watches Women's Sports =

Promotional phrase found on apparel

"Everyone Watches Women's Sports" is a phrase intended to both promote and reflect the rise in popularity in women's sports in the 2020s. The phrase was first published on a shirt released in December 2023 by Togethxr, an apparel brand founded by Sue Bird, Alex Morgan, Simone Manuel, and Chloe Kim. Bird described the phrase as a response to disparaging online commentators who say "Nobody watches women's sports". The original shirt is black with white lettering.

The shirt starting gaining popularity when it was worn by Dawn Staley, the coach of the University of South Carolina's women's basketball team in January 2024. It continued to rise in popularity as it was worn by Jason Sudeikis as he sat courtside at the 2024 NCAA Division I women's basketball championship game and when Bird gifted one to Jimmy Fallon on The Tonight Show. The phrase has been worn or promoted by celebrities and athletes such as Serena Williams, Chelsea Handler, Simone Biles, and Paige Bueckers. In September 2024, President Joe Biden said the phrase while congratulating the 2023 NWSL champions Gotham FC.

Togethxr has collaborated with several teams and brands to promote the phrase. An alternative version of the shirt stating the phrase in French ("Tout le Monde Regarde le Sport Féminin.") was commonly worn at the Paris 2024 Olympics. A collaboration shirt using the colors of the WNBA Golden State Valkyries was released in July 2024. In December 2024, Nike and Togethxr collaborated on a basketball shoe. In September 2025, the London City Lionesses of the Women's Super League included the slogan on their kit manufactured by Nike.

Togethxr had earned $3 million in sales on the t-shirt by July 2024. That year, the slogan generated $6 million in revenue.

In September 2025, WNBA player Angel Reese joined the ownership group of Togethxr.
