= Tottenham Hotspur F.C.–West Ham United F.C. rivalry =

Rivalry between two English football clubs

Tottenham v West Ham
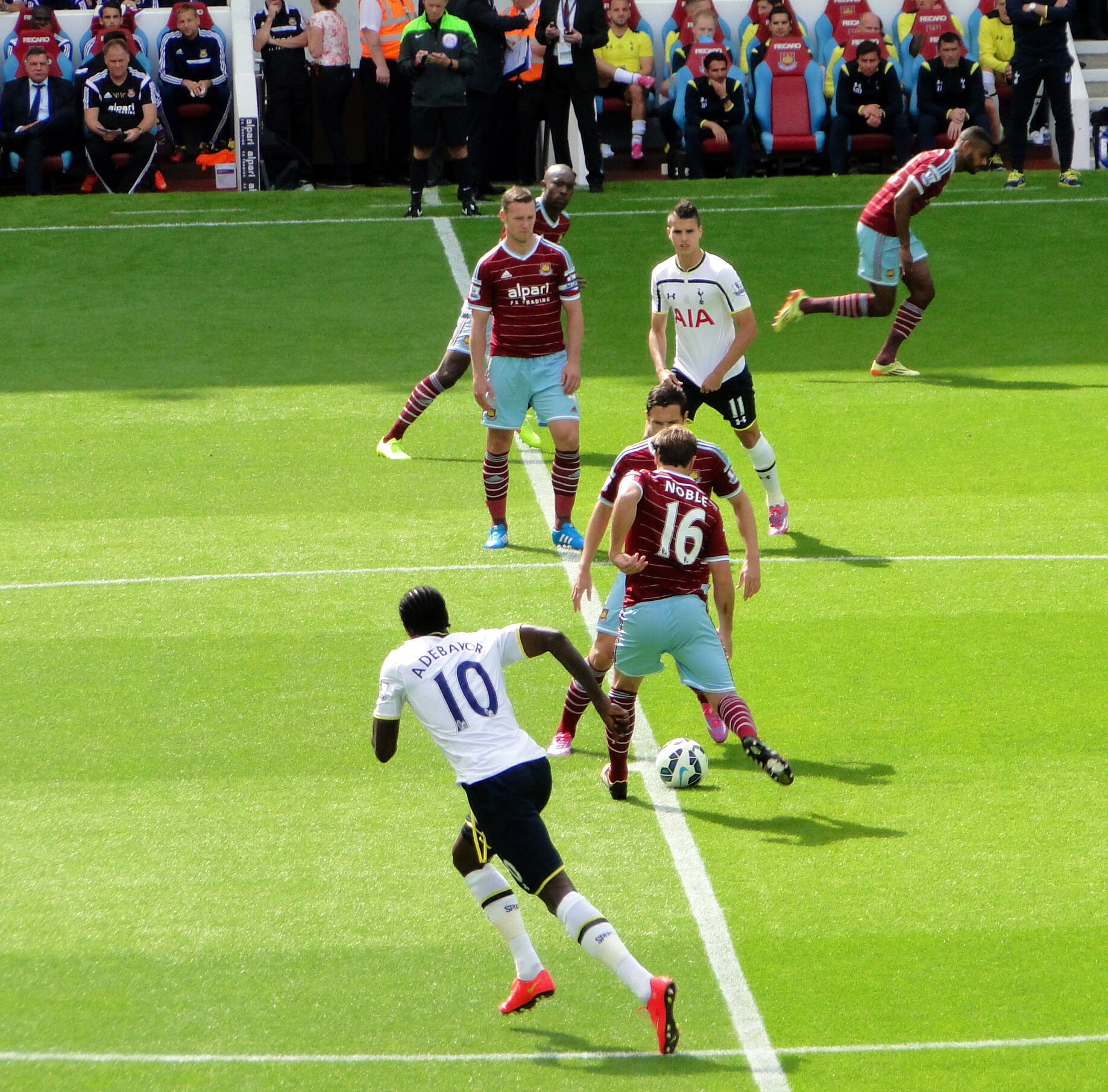
- Tottenham and West Ham players during kick-off of a Premier League match in 2014.
- Other names: North East London derby
- Location: London
- Teams: Tottenham Hotspur; West Ham United
- First meeting: 3 September 1898; Thames and Medway League; Tottenham 3–0 West Ham
- Latest meeting: 17 January 2026; Premier League; Tottenham 1–2 West Ham
- Stadiums: Tottenham Hotspur Stadium (Tottenham Hotspur); London Stadium (West Ham United)

Statistics
- Total meetings: 226
- Most wins: Tottenham (102)
- All-time series: Tottenham: 102; Drawn: 56; West Ham: 68

The Tottenham Hotspur F.C.–West Ham United F.C. rivalry is a rivalry between London-based professional association football clubs Tottenham Hotspur and West Ham United. Tottenham Hotspur play their home games at the Tottenham Hotspur Stadium, while West Ham United play their home games at the London Stadium. The two stadiums are only 5 miles (8 km) apart from each other. As of January 2026, 226 games have been played between the two teams, 102 of which were won by Tottenham and 68 by West Ham.

Despite the two clubs' close proximity, the intensity in the rivalry has only increased in recent years due to West Ham being a regular in the English top-flight alongside Spurs, far from their most intense rivals in Millwall and other East London-based outfits, as well as several notable players moving between the two clubs, especially from the Irons to Tottenham. Recent matches have relatively been even and competitive, with the two at various times being close to one another in the Premier League standings, have also contributed to an increased intensity.

Tottenham fans have considered West Ham a distant tertiary rival behind Arsenal and Chelsea, while West Ham fans have considered Tottenham to be their primary rival in the Premier League.

== History ==
=== Early years ===
Tottenham Hotspur was founded in 1882 by schoolboys from the Tottenham area, while West Ham United was founded in 1895 by shipbuilders from the Thames Ironworks company. On 3 September 1898, the two teams had their first meeting in the Thames and Medway League, which Spurs won 3–0 at home. They would meet frequently in the non-league for the next 10 years, until Tottenham was elected into the Football League in 1908. West Ham would themselves later get elected into the Football League in 1919. On 21 February 1920, the two clubs would meet for the first time in the FA Cup which Tottenham again won 3–0. That same season they met for the first time in the Football League's Second Division with West Ham prevailing 2–1 at home. 8 days later, Tottenham would win the return fixture 2–0.

=== 1950–1992 ===
During the 1949–50 season, Tottenham completed a league double over the Hammers, winning 1–0 at the Boleyn Ground and 4–1 at White Hart Lane, en route to winning the Second Division title and promotion to the First Division, where they then immediately won their first-ever top-flight league title.

In 1958, West Ham returned to the Football League First Division after a 32-year hiatus following promotion from winning the Second Division. During their first season back, they completed a league double over Tottenham with both games on consecutive days on Christmas and Boxing Day, 2–1 at home and 4–1 away. During the 1960–61 season, Tottenham completed a league double with both games either side of Christmas day, 2–0 at home and 3–0 away, en route to winning their second-ever top-flight league title. During the 1960's, both clubs were successful both domestically and abroad with Spurs winning the aforementioned 1961 league title as well as 3 FA Cup's, and the 1963 Cup Winners' Cup, while West Ham won the 1964 FA Cup final and the subsequent 1965 Cup Winners' Cup. Both also had key players for England's triumph of the 1966 World Cup, with West Ham being represented by Martin Peters, England captain Bobby Moore, and final hat-trick hero Geoff Hurst, while Tottenham were represented by striker Jimmy Greaves with England manager Alf Ramsey being a former Tottenham player himself. In March 1970, West Ham and Tottenham agreed to swap Peters for Greaves with Spurs agreeing to pay a then-record £200,000 for Peters' services. Greaves, who had just become Tottenham's all-time record goalscorer, spent a single season at the Hammers, though scored in his return to White Hart Lane in a 2–2 draw. Peters, meanwhile, would spend 5 full seasons in North London where he won two League Cups and the inaugural UEFA Cup in 1972 over Wolverhampton Wanderers.

During the 1976–77 season, Tottenham suffered a shock relegation after finishing bottom of the First Division, 3 points and 5 places behind West Ham. The next season, Tottenham secured promotion on the final day on goal difference over Brighton & Hove Albion, while the Hammers would end up relegated after losing their final game of the season, 0–2 at home to Liverpool. West Ham would not return to England's top-flight for 3 seasons, during which time they won the 1980 FA Cup final over Tottenham's North London rivals Arsenal and reached the final of the 1980–81 Football League Cup, which during their run prevailed 1–0 over Tottenham in the fifth round en route to the final, where they lost to Liverpool in a replay. In the 1986–87 Football League Cup, the two teams met in the quarter-finals with the initial match-up ending 1–1 at the Boleyn Ground, and forcing a replay at White Hart Lane which Spurs won 5–0. In the final season of the Football League First Division in 1991–92, they split the league fixtures with both teams winning at home but West Ham finished bottom of the standings and missed out on the inaugural season of the new breakaway FA Premier League.

=== Premier League era ===
During the 1992–93 season, West Ham gained automatic promotion on the first time of asking after finishing 2nd on goal difference over Portsmouth. In their first season together in the Premier League, the Hammers finished 7 points and 2 places above Spurs in 13th with Tottenham winning 3–1 in East London but falling 1–4 in the return fixture.

On 24 February 1997, the two sides met in a memorable high-scoring back-and-forth affair with the game 2–2 by the 30th minute before John Hartson took the lead for West Ham before half-time. David Howells would even the score in the 53rd minute before Julian Dicks scored the game-winning penalty for West Ham in the 72nd minute.

During the 2001–02 season, on 15 September 2002 in their first meeting of the season, Tottenham got a dramatic 3–2 home win over West Ham after Anthony Gardner's first-ever Premier League goal in the dying minutes proved to be the winner. West Ham won the return fixture 2–0, but ended up relegated despite accruing 42 points, which remains the record for the most points by a Premier League team in a 38-game season that failed to stay up.

==== The "Lasagna-gate" scandal ====
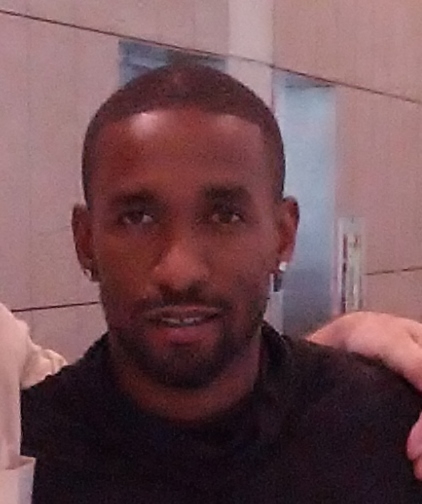
Former West Ham player Jermain Defoe (pictured) scored the equaliser for Tottenham in an infamous eventual 2–1 defeat to his former side on the final day in 2006

After two seasons in the second-tier, they returned to the top-flight for the 2005–06 season. During their first meeting at Tottenham's ground, Tottenham's Mido opened the scoring in the 16th minute but a late equaliser from Anton Ferdinand in the 90th minute forced a 1–1 draw. In their second meeting on the final day of the Premier League season, Tottenham entered the game only needing a win to secure 4th-place and Champions League qualification over Arsenal, while West Ham could not qualify for more prestigious European competition through the league standings and were already guaranteed a spot in the UEFA Cup by virtue of reaching the 2006 FA Cup final. The night prior to the game, 10 Tottenham players, including key stars and former Hammers Calum Davenport and Michael Carrick, suffered from food poisoning from the lasagna they just ate for dinner. Tottenham had suggested for the game to be postponed which West Ham agreed to, but this request was swiftly denied by the Football Association, with threats of a points deduction if the game was not played when scheduled. During the game, many of Tottenham's players were visibly dejected and struggling to jog around the pitch and ended up losing 2–1 after Yossi Benayoun scored the winning goal for West Ham in the 80th minute. At the same time, Arsenal came from behind at their last game in Highbury to win 4–2 against Wigan Athletic and secure Champions League qualification and finish above Tottenham for an 11th consecutive season. Tottenham attempted to request a replay, which again the FA denied, and a full investigation and scandal dubbed "Lasagna-gate" went into the source of the stomach bug which afflected the Spurs players, which was judged to be a viral gastroenteritis rather than food poisoning. Though a myth that the chef at the hotel where they got their pre-match dinner at was an Arsenal fan who purposely poisoned their food still persists today.

The next season when the two teams met again in Upton Park on 4 March 2007, both teams were at opposite sides of the table with Tottenham again fighting for European places but West Ham staving to fight off relegation. West Ham took a 2–0 lead at the half thanks to volleys from Mark Noble and Carlos Tevez, but Spurs managed to even the score after former Hammer Jermain Defoe scored a penalty Teemu Tainio produced a sensational strike. In the 85th-minute, former Tottenham player Bobby Zamora scored a header from a free kick to give West Ham a 3–2 lead. However, Tottenham would respond 4 minutes later with a free kick from Dimitar Berbatov. In the dying seconds of stoppage time, Tottenham would break through on the counter with Defoe having a shot get saved by Rob Green who spilled the ball into the legs of Paul Stalteri, who comfortably scored a late winner. The dramatic defeat kept West Ham bottom of the league standings, 10 points off safety, but they managed to rally 7 wins from their last 9 games to get a miraculous great escape and stay up on the final day of the season.

==== Olympic Stadium bidding fiasco ====
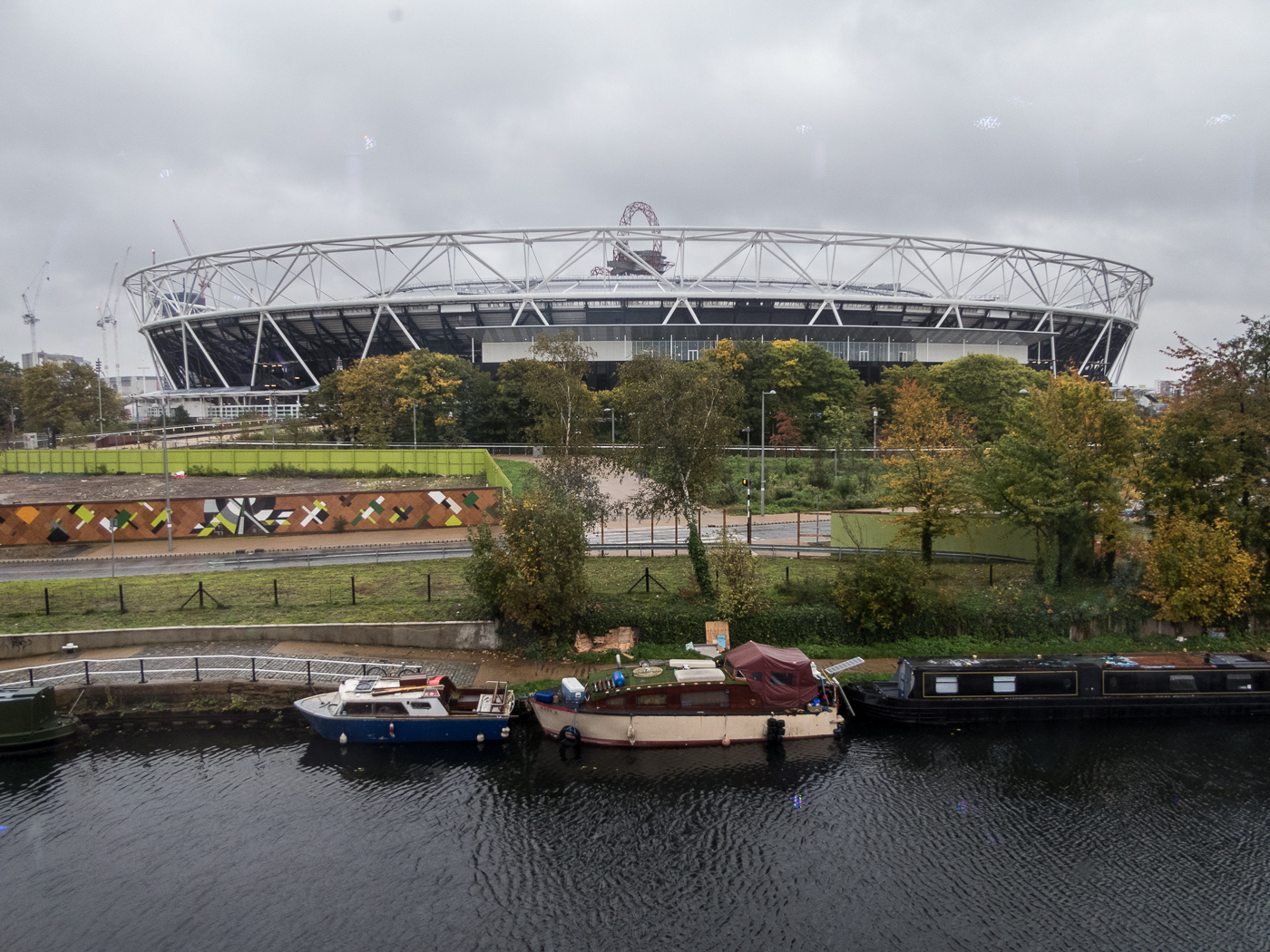
West Ham fought with Tottenham over becoming anchor tenants of the Olympic Stadium (pictured) after 2012.

At the turn of the decade in 2010, both Tottenham and West Ham were looking for a new stadium and saw the planned multi-purpose Olympic Stadium for the 2012 Summer Olympics in Stratford as an upgrade on their existing grounds. Because of its location in Newham, West Ham were expected to be favorites to become tenants of the new ground. West Ham, unlike Tottenham, were not opposed to keeping the Olympic track around the stadium, which put them into greater favour with the Olympic Park Legacy Company (OPLC) who were tasked by the Greater London Authority in maintaining the area following the 2012 Olympics. On March 2011, the OPLC and the UK Government ultimately awarded tenant rights to West Ham. But 3 months later, an investigation into the vote for tenancy was to be conducted after The Sunday Times claimed there was evidence of corruption and "secret payments" for votes. Soon after, West Ham pressed charges on the tabloid newspaper and Tottenham, who they claimed illegally obtained information about West Ham seeking consultancy and spread it to tabloids, which Tottenham denied. Tottenham had also sued the OPLC to force the decision of tenancy to be reversed in favour of themselves. On October 2011, the awarding of tenancy was cancelled and the stadium would be publicly owned with a new bidding process to be taken again, which Tottenham decided to back out of in favour of building their own new stadium in Tottenham. Ultimately in 2013, West Ham prevailed again in asserting regular occupancy of the Olympic Stadium over nearby Leyton Orient.

The stadium saga and lawsuits put a strain on relations between the two clubs and Tottenham chairman Daniel Levy with West Ham co-chairmen David Gold and David Sullivan. It was so much so that in February 2015 on transfer deadline day, with Levy willing to loan or sell out-of-form striker Emmanuel Adebayor, he refused any inquiries from the Hammers in favour of offers from Queens Park Rangers and Crystal Palace, which the Togolese forward refused both and so he remained in the squad for the rest of the season. Seven months later, Adebayor and Tottenham agreed to mutually terminate his contract and in January 2016, he signed with Crystal Palace as a free agent.

In the 2012–13 season, West Ham returned to the Premier League having been relegated a year prior. Tottenham won the first meeting at White Hart Lane on 25 November 2012, convincing 3–1 with Defoe scoring a brace and Gareth Bale also appearing on the scoresheet for Tottenham. Four months later at the return fixture at Upton Park, Tottenham took an early lead from Bale before Andy Carroll scored a penalty 12 minutes later. By the 60th minute, West Ham took the lead through Joe Cole. Nearly 15 minutes later, Gylfi Sigurðsson evened the score with a short finish from a corner kick. In the 90th minute, Bale scored a spectacular volley from distance to win the game for Tottenham and secure another league double over the Irons. The next season, West Ham secured their first league double over Tottenham in the Premier League era, winning 3–0 at White Hart Lane and 2–0 at Upton Park. In addition, they knocked out Tottenham in the League Cup quarter-finals, 2–1, after late goals from Matt Jarvis and Modibo Maïga. In the 2014–15 season, the two clubs met on the opening day of the season at Upton Park. The match, which was new Tottenham boss Mauricio Pochettino's first at the club, was goalless through 90 minutes with Mark Noble missing a penalty in the first half, until new Spurs signing Eric Dier scored the winner in the 93rd minute. In the return fixture in North London, West Ham took a 2–0 lead after 63 minutes until late goals from Danny Rose and Harry Kane salvaged a point for Tottenham.

==== Tottenham title hopes dashed ====
During the 2015–16 season, Tottenham mounted an impressive start where they went unbeaten in 14 games after losing their season opener at Old Trafford against Manchester United, during which they managed to drum up a 4–1 win over the Hammers on 22 November. By March, they were firmly in the title race alongside Leicester City and Arsenal. However, they would suffer their 4th league defeat at their last game at Upton Park with Michail Antonio scoring the only goal of the match in the opening minutes. The loss put a dent in Spurs' title hopes as they had the chance to go top of the table with a win and they ultimately finished 3rd in the Champions League spots, while West Ham finished 7th and qualified for the Europa League in back-to-back seasons. During the 2016–17 season, Tottenham again mounted an impressive start where they went unbeaten in their first 11 games but drew their last 4 entering their first meeting in Tottenham. West Ham took an early lead in the first half through Antonio. In the second half, Tottenham's Harry Winks, who was making his first start for the club, equalised early in the 51st minute before Tottenham conceded a penalty 15 minutes later, converted by Manuel Lanzini, to give the Hammers the lead. In the last few minutes of the match, Kane scored two goals in quick succession to steal a 3–2 win for Spurs and maintain their unbeaten start. When the two sides met again in May 2017, Tottenham were on a run of 9 consecutive wins and only 4 points off league leaders Chelsea. The match, which was Tottenham's first visit to the Olympic Stadium, proved to be a cagey affair with West Ham winning 1–0, putting all-but-an-end to Tottenham's title hopes yet again.

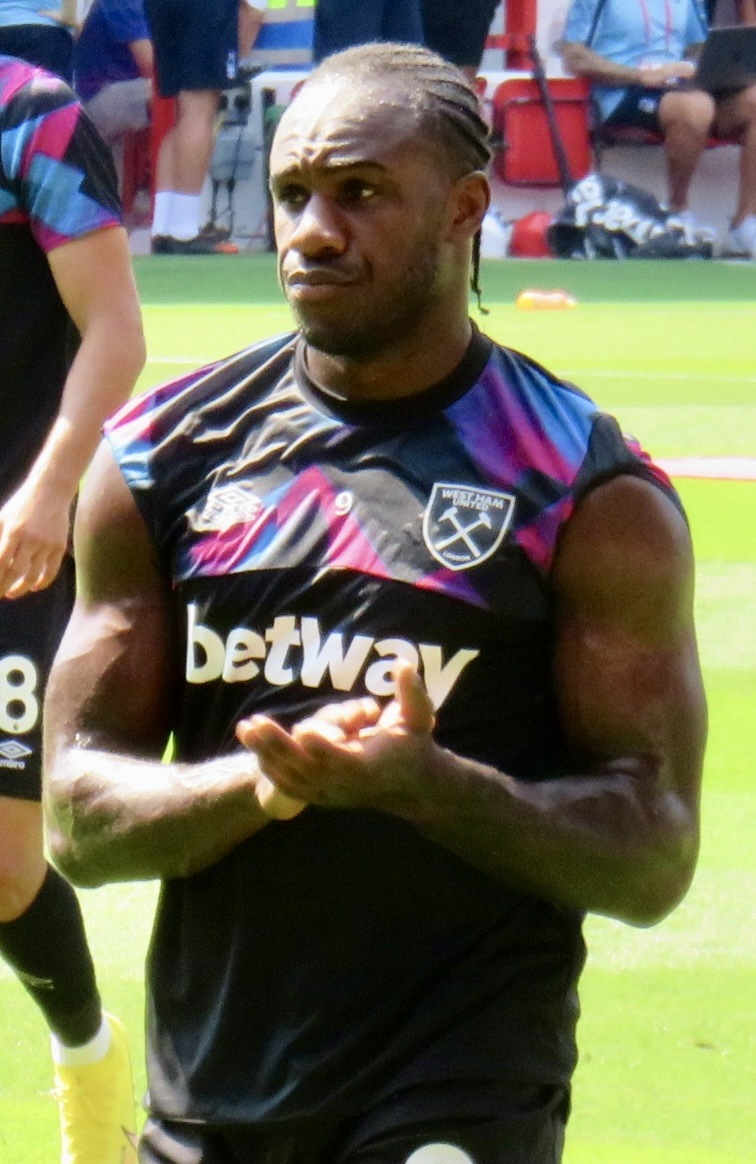
Michail Antonio (pictured) scored the winner for West Ham in their away match at Tottenham in 2019.

On 25 October 2017, just days after getting a massive 4–1 win at their temporary home of Wembley against Liverpool and managing a 1–1 draw at the Bernabéu against Real Madrid a week later, Tottenham bowed out of the League Cup fourth round to West Ham after they came from 2–0 down to win 3–2 at Wembley. Tottenham would get their revenge a year later in the League Cup, winning 3–1 at the London Stadium. During the game, Tottenham forward Son Heung-min who scored a brace, was the subject of anti-Asian racial abuse from a Hammers fan, with the fan fined by the CPS and indefinetely banned by the club from attending matches at the London Stadium. Later during the 2018–19 season, Tottenham opened their new stadium in April and immediately moved into it for the last few matches of the season. In their first 4 matches at their new home ground in all competitions, they won all 4 without conceding a single goal. In their penultimate home game of the Premier League season against West Ham, Michail Antonio scored the stadium's first away goal in the 67th minute following which he busted out a wild goal celebration, and with Spurs failing to muster a response, proved to be their first loss at the new stadium. Tottenham managed to remain in the Top 4 for the remainder of the season and reached their first-ever UEFA Champions League final after coming from down 0–3 aggregate in Amsterdam against Ajax thanks to a hat-trick from Lucas Moura. Tottenham ultimately lost the final 0–2 to Premier League runners-up Liverpool, and afterwards West Ham bizarrely publicly congratulated Liverpool on Twitter.

In November 2019, Pochettino was sacked by Tottenham following a terrible start to the season with former-Chelsea and Manchester United manager José Mourinho immediately hired as his replacement. Mourinho's first game was away to West Ham, with Tottenham entering the match having failed a single away league match since January. Tottenham led 3–0 after 50 minutes; 2 later goals from Michail Antonio and Angelo Ogbonna were not enough and Spurs held on to win 3–2. Prior to the return fixture in June 2020, West Ham were 17th in the league and only above the drop on goal difference, while Tottenham rebounded to be in the race for the European spots. Tottenham cruised to a 2–0 win thanks to an own goal from Tomáš Souček and Kane having his first goal since December 2019. Ultimately, West Ham would surive having gone unbeaten in their last 4 games. The two clubs met early in the 2020–21 season in October in Tottenham's 3rd home game of the season and Bale's first appearance for Tottenham since leaving for a world-record fee in 2013. Spurs quickly jumped to a 3–0 lead after 15 minutes with Son scoring just 45 seconds into the match and Kane notching a brace. In the 82nd minute, Fabián Balbuena scored a header from a free kick to put the Hammers on the scoresheet. Three minutes later, Vladimír Coufal cross was deflected by Tottenham defender Davinson Sánchez back into his own net and West Ham were back into the game at 3–2. In stoppage time, Bale nearly scored to make it 4–2 then with just seconds of the game left to play, Lanzini fired in a long-distance shot to complete the 3–3 comeback and salvage a point for West Ham. West Ham won the return fixture 2–1 and went 9 points above Tottenham in the league table. Ultimately, the two teams would stay close to each other in the league standings, with West Ham ending up in 6th, 1 place and 3 points above Tottenham, to secure Europa League qualification and finish above the Lilywhites for the first time since 2008. In the next season at the league fixture at the London Stadium, West Ham would win 1–0 with Michail Antonio scoring the only goal in the second half. The loss would prove to be new Tottenham manager Nuno Espírito Santo's penultimate game coaching the club before being sacked and immediately being replaced by Antonio Conte. Conte's Tottenham would get the better of West Ham in the League Cup quarter-finals, with a 2–1 win at home. Then, when the two met in the return league fixture, Tottenham won 3–1 thanks to an own goal from Kurt Zouma and a brace from Son, which moved Spurs above West Ham in the standings to 5th. At the end of the season, Tottenham finished 4th and qualified for the Champions League, while West Ham finished 7th and qualified for the Europa Conference League.

==== Kudus transfer saga and relegation battle ====
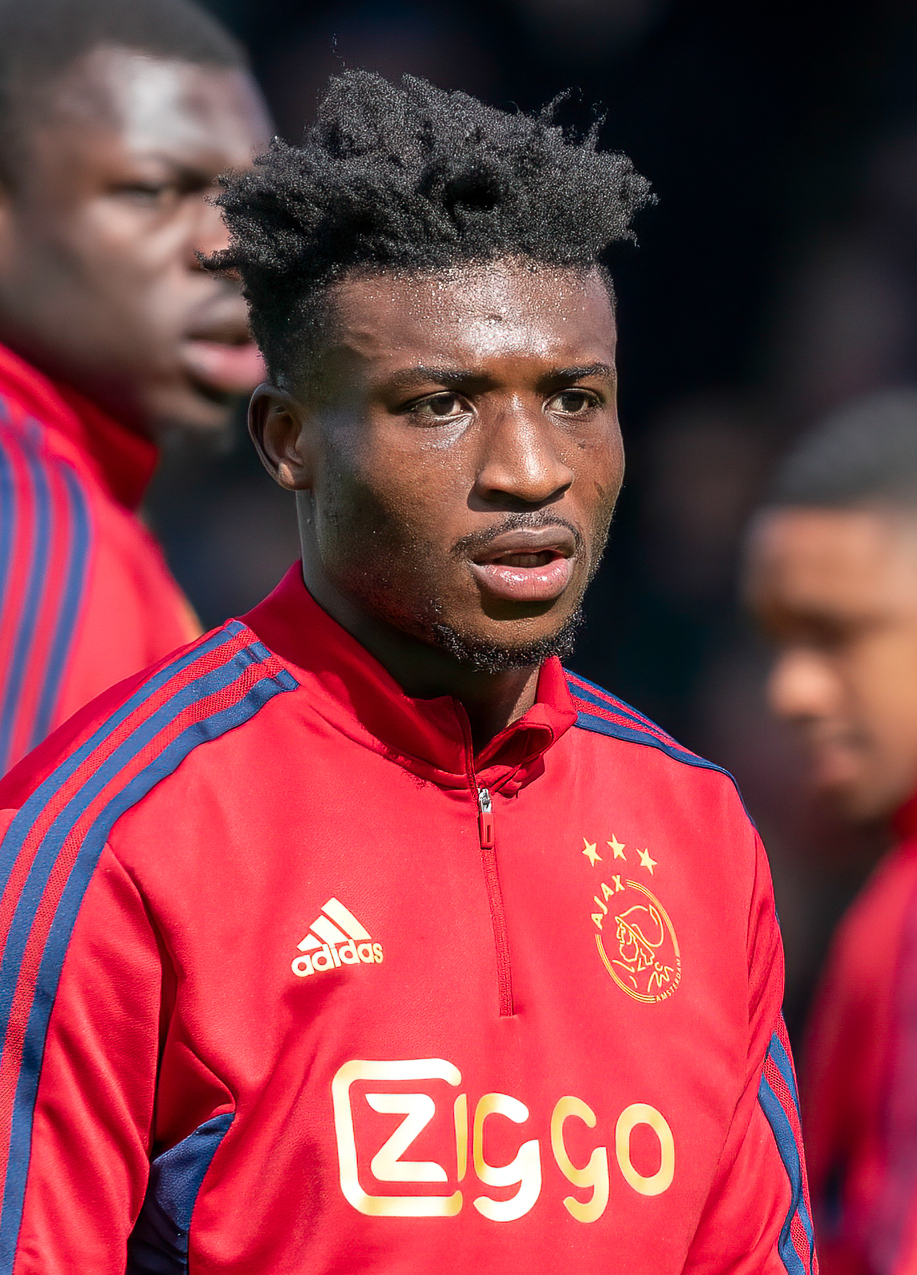
Mohammed Kudus (pictured) transferred from West Ham to Tottenham in July 2025.

In the 2024–25 season, Tottenham won the Europa League and ended their 17-year trophy drought despite finishing 17th in the league, 5 points and 3 places behind West Ham. Using the resulting qualification to the Champions League to their advantage, Tottenham tried to massively bolster their squad and attempted to make contact with West Ham for Ghanaian winger Mohammed Kudus, who had just finished each of the previous two Premier League campaigns with the most dribbles. That same season, he scored the opening goal in the first half when the two clubs met at the Tottenham Hotspur Stadium in an eventual 4–1 defeat against Spurs, where he also got sent off in the 86th minute for a violent offense on Tottenham's Dutch defender Micky van de Ven. West Ham had not sold a player directly to Tottenham since 2011 with Scott Parker moving from East to North after they were relegated to the Championship, and they were initially hesistant to sell to Tottenham over the likes of Arsenal and Chelsea, despite needing funds to rebuild the squad under new coach Graham Potter. After advanced negotiations on 10 July 2025, Tottenham paid a reported £55m to the Irons for the Ghanaian. The move to their nearby rivals and the lower fee was criticized by many West Ham supporters, who had grown frustrated with the club's board over downtrudden form in the league and unsuccessful signings, as well as just a general dislike for Tottenham. Kudus had preferred a move to Tottenham over Arsenal and Chelsea due to assurances of playing time among other things, with Tottenham mockingly joking during their announcement of his signing that "He only wanted Spurs". Tottenham and West Ham met early in their fourth league game of the season at the London Stadium in September. Kudus started for Tottenham and received a hostile reception and boos every time he touched the ball. The game was scoreless at halftime, but at the beginning of the second half, Tottenham midfielder Pape Matar Sarr opened the scoring with a header from a inswinging corner. Soon afterwards, Souček received a red card for a terrible challenge on João Palhinha and the Hammers were down to 10 men. Spurs soon scored two goals through Lucas Bergvall and Van de Ven to cruise to a 3–0 victory. Two weeks following the defeat, Potter was sacked by West Ham and replaced with former Tottenham manager Nuno Espírito Santo. Near the end of the calendar year, both teams were in very poor form in the bottom half of the standings with West Ham firmly in the relegation zone at 18th with 13 points from 17 games and Tottenham only 12 points above them at 14th. The two teams met in the return fixture in Tottenham on 17 January. Tottenham entered the match having had been very poor at home in the league with only 2 wins from 10, while West Ham had only won 1 away match from 10. West Ham scored early in the 15th minute after Crysencio Summerville rifled in a quick finish in the box to give the Irons the lead. Tottenham equalised in the 64th minute through a header from Cristian Romero, but could not hold on as former Newcastle striker Callum Wilson poked the winner for West Ham in stoppage time after Tottenham failed to clear an inswinger from a corner. Tottenham's performance in that game and previous others intensified pressure and criticism on the recently hired new boss Thomas Frank, who got sacked a month later. West Ham meanwhile would get an uptick in form following the win, while Tottenham's form was miserable and they failed to get a single Premier League win in 2026 until 25 April. After a 4–0 home win over Wolverhampton Wanderers on 10 April, West Ham briefly climbed out of the relegation zone over Tottenham. However, Tottenham would catch new life under the recently hired former Brighton & Hove Albion manager Roberto De Zerbi who earned 8 points from his first 5 games and climbed out of the relegation zone following a 2–1 away win at Aston Villa, whilst West Ham slipped into 3 consecutive defeats in May. A defeat at Stamford Bridge to West London rivals Chelsea in Tottenham's penultimate game of the season sent the fight for survival all the way to the final day, with Tottenham only 2 points above West Ham and both playing their last matches at home. Due to Tottenham's vastly superior goal difference, West Ham effectively needed not only to win, but for Tottenham to lose. West Ham would win 3–0 against Leeds United, but Tottenham's 1–0 win against Everton, then managed by former West Ham manager David Moyes, would ensure Tottenham's Premier League survival at the expense of their nearby rivals.

== Supporters ==
Because of the close proximity of the two clubs, there is an intersection of the two fanbases in Northeast London, which leads to the match having increased importance for bragging rights. Matches between the two are usually sold out with supporters frequently provoking negative chants about each other. One popular chant sung by West Ham fans is "West Ham are massive everythere they go; Tottenham get battered everywhere they go", which is reversed by Tottenham fans in response when their club wins this fixture or sometimes the latter ironically in defiance of West Ham supporters.

Like in many other London derbies and English footballing rivalries, hooliganism and violence between supporters and firms has existed, especially during the hayday of violence between British football fans in the 1980's, with members of West Ham's Inter City Firm getting into frequent clashes with Tottenham's Yid Army when the two clubs met during the decade. Also like in many of Tottenham's other rivalries with Chelsea and Arsenal, antisemitic chants and jeers about Tottenham have been sung from West Ham fans, though this has decreased in recent years.

== Players who have played for or managed both teams ==
Below are the players and managers who played for or managed both clubs.

=== Tottenham then West Ham ===
- (England) Charles Ambler (as player: Tottenham 1894–1895, 1896–1900; West Ham 1901–1902)
- (England) John Burton (as player: Tottenham 1900–1905; West Ham 1908)
- (Wales) Fred Griffiths (as player: Tottenham 1901–1902; West Ham 1902–1904)
- (England) Fred Massey (as player: Tottenham 1907–1909; West Ham 1909–1914)
- (England) Almer Hall (as player: Tottenham 1934–1937; West Ham 1945–1950)
- (England) Les Bennett (as player: Tottenham 1946–1954; West Ham 1954–1955)
- (England) Dave Dunmore (as player: Tottenham 1953–1959; West Ham 1960–1961)
- (England) Jimmy Greaves (as player: Tottenham 1961–1970; West Ham 1970–1971)
- (England) Jimmy Neighbour (as player: Tottenham 1966–1976; West Ham 1979–1983)
- (England) Steve Walford (as player: Tottenham 1975–1977; West Ham 1983–1989)
- (Republic of Ireland) Chris Hughton (as player: Tottenham 1977–1990; West Ham 1990–1992; as manager: Tottenham 1997, 1998)
- (England) Tony Parks (as player: Tottenham 1980–1988; West Ham 1991–1992)
- (England) Simon Webster (as player: Tottenham 1981–1985; West Ham 1990–1993)
- (Wales) Mark Bowen (as player: Tottenham 1981–1987; West Ham 1996–1997)
- (England) Clive Allen (as player: Tottenham 1984–1988; West Ham 1992–1994; as manager: Tottenham 2007, 2008)
- (England) John Moncur (as player: Tottenham 1984–1992; West Ham 1994–2003)
- (England) Teddy Sheringham (as player: Tottenham 1992–1997, 2001–2003; West Ham 2004–2007)
- (England) Neil Ruddock (as player: Tottenham 1986–1988, 1992–1993; West Ham 1998–2000)
- (England) Mitchell Thomas (as player: Tottenham 1986–1991; West Ham 1991–1994)
- (England) Mark Robson (as player: Tottenham 1987–1992; West Ham 1992–1993)
- (Romania) Ilie Dumitrescu (as player: Tottenham 1994–1995; West Ham 1996)
- (England) Alan Pardew (as player: Tottenham 1995; as manager: West Ham 2003–2006)
- (England) Les Ferdinand (as player: Tottenham 1997–2003; West Ham 2003)
- (Argentina) Mauricio Taricco (as player: Tottenham 1998–2004; West Ham 2004)
- (Ukraine) Serhiy Rebrov (as player: Tottenham 2000–2002; West Ham 2004–2005)
- (England) Matthew Etherington (as player: Tottenham 2000–2003; West Ham 2003–2009)
- (England) Rob Burch (as player: Tottenham 2002–2007; West Ham 2004–2005)
- (Republic of Ireland) Robbie Keane (as player: Tottenham 2002–2008, 2009–2011; West Ham 2011)
- (England) Paul Konchesky (as player: Tottenham 2003; West Ham 2005–2007)
- (England) Bobby Zamora (as player: Tottenham 2003–2004; West Ham 2004–2008)
- (England) Calum Davenport (as player: Tottenham 2004–2007; West Ham 2004, 2007–2010)
- (Egypt) Mido (as player: Tottenham 2005–2007; West Ham 2010)
- (England) David Bentley (as player: Tottenham 2008–2013; West Ham 2011)
- (England) Ryan Fredericks (as player: Tottenham 2010–2015; West Ham 2018–2022)
- (England) Kyle Walker-Peters (as player: Tottenham 2015–2020; West Ham 2025–present)
- (Portugal) Nuno Espírito Santo (as manager: Tottenham 2021; West Ham 2025–present)
- (Israel) Manor Solomon (as player: Tottenham 2023–2026; West Ham 2026–present)

=== West Ham then Tottenham ===
- (Scotland) James Reid (as player: West Ham 1900–1901; Tottenham 1906–1907)
- (Scotland) Peter Kyle (as player: West Ham 1901–1902; Tottenham 1905–1906)
- (England) Christopher Carrick (as player: West Ham 1904–1905; Tottenham 1905–1906)
- (England) Fred Milnes (as player: West Ham 1904–1905; Tottenham 1905–1906)
- (England) Jack Tresadern (as player: West Ham 1913; Tottenham 1935–1938)
- (England) Bill Kaine (as player: West Ham 1924; Tottenham 1925)
- (England) George Foreman (as player: West Ham 1938; Tottenham 1946)
- (England) Charlie Whitchurch (as player: West Ham 1945–1946; Tottenham 1946–1947)
- (England) Johnny Jordan (as player: West Ham 1946–1947; Tottenham 1947–1948)
- (England) John Smith (as player: West Ham 1956–1960; Tottenham 1960–1964)
- (England) Martin Peters (as player: West Ham 1959–1970; Tottenham 1970–1975)
- (England) Harry Redknapp (as player: West Ham 1965–1972; as manager: West Ham 1994–2001, Tottenham 2008–2012)
- (England) Trevor Hartley (as player: West Ham 1967–1969; as manager: Tottenham 1987)
- (England) Paul Allen (as player: West Ham 1979–1985; Tottenham 1985–1993)
- (England) Michael Carrick (as player: West Ham 1999–2004; Tottenham 2004–2006)
- (England) Jermain Defoe (as player: West Ham 1999–2004; Tottenham 2004–2008, 2009–2014)
- (Mali) Frédéric Kanouté (as player: West Ham 2000–2003; Tottenham 2003–2005)
- (England) Jimmy Walker (as player: West Ham 2004–2009; Tottenham 2009–2010)
- (England) Scott Parker (as player: West Ham 2007–2011; Tottenham 2011–2013)
- (England) Joe Hart (as player: West Ham 2017–2018; Tottenham 2020–2021)
- (Ghana) Mohammed Kudus (as player: West Ham 2023–2025; Tottenham 2025–present)
- (Portugal) Mateus Fernandes (as player: West Ham 2025–2026; Tottenham 2026–present)

== Honours ==
List of honours won by Tottenham Hotspur and West Ham United
International competitions	Tottenham Hotspur	West Ham United
UEFA Cup / UEFA Europa League	3	0
UEFA Cup Winners' Cup	1	1
UEFA Conference League	0	1
National competitions	Tottenham Hotspur	West Ham United
First Division / Premier League	2	0
FA Cup	8	3
League Cup	4	0
FA Community Shield	7	0
Total	25	5

== Head-to-head record ==
As of 17 January 2026

Competition	Matches	Tottenham wins	Draws	West Ham wins
League	204	92	50	62
FA Cup	11	6	3	2
League Cup	11	5	2	4
Total	226	103	55	68
