= Jocelyn Prêcheur =

French football manager (born 1982)

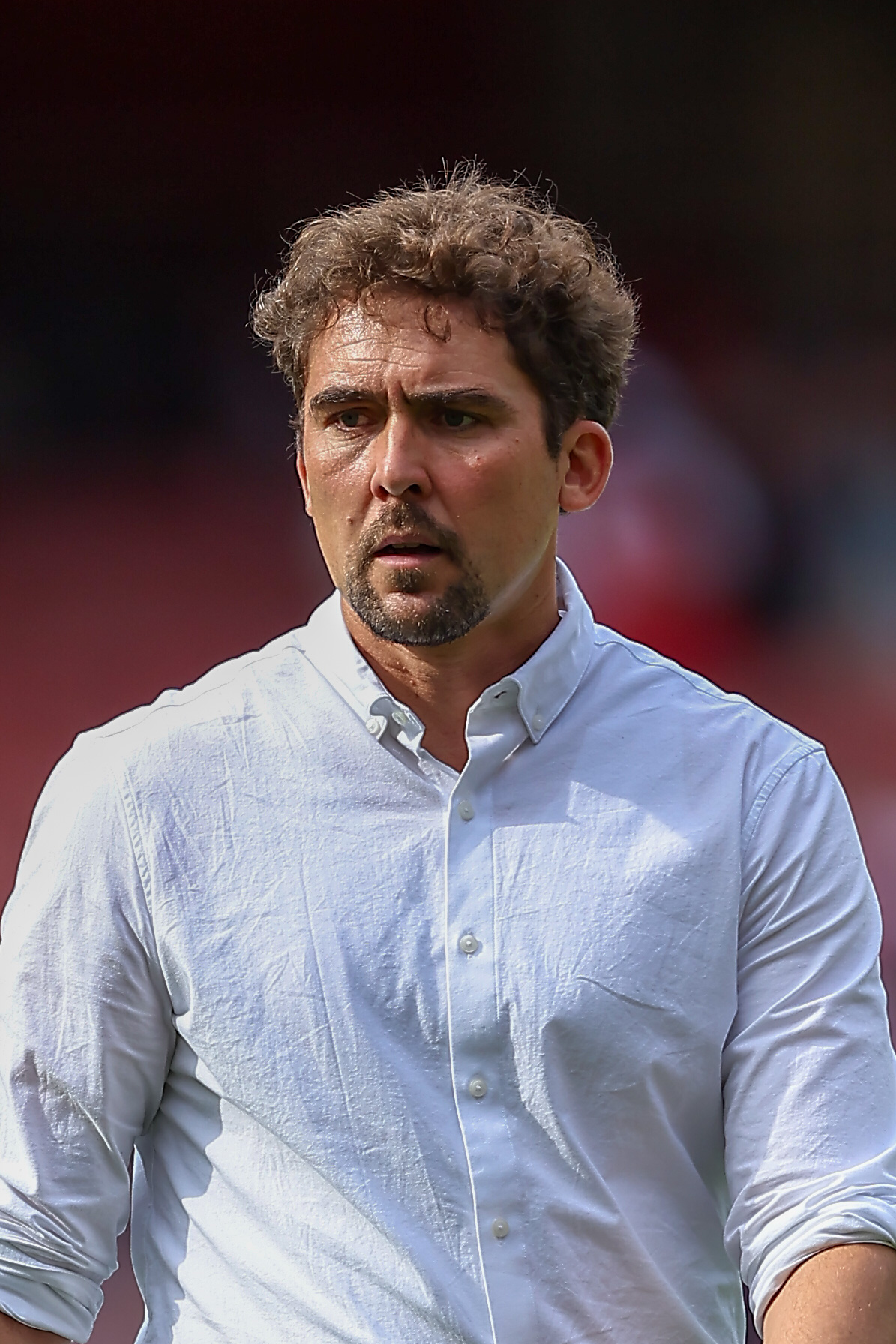
- Prêcheur in 2025

Personal information
- Full name: Jocelyn Jacques Roland Prêcheur
- Date of birth: 5 May 1982 (age 44)
- Place of birth: Clermont-Ferrand, France

Youth career
- Years: Team
- 1997–2000: Viry-Châtillon

Managerial career
- 2019–2021: Jiangsu Suning Women
- 2022: Meizhou Hakka Women
- 2023–2024: Paris Saint-Germain Women
- 2024–2025: London City Lionesses

Jocelyn Jacques Roland Prêcheur (French: [ʒɔ.sə.lɛ̃ ʒak ʁɔ.lɑ̃ pʁɛ.ʃœʁ]; born 5 May 1982) is a French professional football manager.

He has previously managed Paris Saint-Germain, Jiangsu Suning and Meizhou Hakka.

== Early life ==
Prêcheur is the son of manager and former player Gérard Prêcheur. He played for Viry-Châtillon during his youth career. He stopped playing football after baccalauréat to focus on studies and graduated in engineering from Télécom Paris.

Prêcheur returned to football after his graduation and developed software which analyzes the match and players using video capture. This helped him to work as an analyst for Division 1 Féminine clubs Paris Saint-Germain and Lyon between 2010 and 2017. He also co-founded Juvisy Académie de Football de L'Essonne in 2008, where he worked as technical director until 2017.

== Managerial career ==
In December 2017, Prêcheur's father Gérard was appointed as the manager of Chinese Women's Super League club Jiangsu Suning. Prêcheur was confirmed as the assistant manager and moved to China with his father. Following his father's departure from the club, Prêcheur took over as manager prior to the 2019 season. He won four trophies including the league title during his first season as manager.

Prêcheur left Jiangsu after the 2021 season and joined Meizhou Hakka in 2022. However, he left the club within three months citing personal reasons. On 1 August 2022, he was named as the assistant manager of Paris Saint-Germain following the appointment of his father as the new manager of the club.

On 28 September 2023, Prêcheur became the new manager of Paris Saint-Germain after his father parted ways with the club. He won his first trophy with the club on 4 May 2024 by defeating Fleury in the final of Coupe de France.

On 27 June 2024, Prêcheur was appointed as the manager of Women's Championship side London City Lionesses on a three-year deal. He won the league title in his first season with the club, securing their promotion to the Women's Super League for the first time. Prêcheur was sacked on 21 December 2025.

== Honours ==
Jiangsu Suning

- Chinese Women's Super League: 2019
- Chinese National Women's Football Championship: 2019
- Chinese Women's FA Cup: 2019
- Chinese Women's Super Cup: 2019
- AFC Women's Club Championship runner-up: 2019

Paris Saint-Germain

- Coupe de France: 2023–24

London City Lionesses

- Women's Championship: 2024–25
