= Fred Milnes =

English footballer

Personal information
- Full name: Frederick Houghton Milnes
- Date of birth: 26 January 1878
- Place of birth: Wortley, England
- Date of death: 1946 (aged 67–68)
- Position: Full back

Senior career*
Years	Team	Apps	(Gls)
1896–1897	Wycliffe		
1897–1902	Sheffield		
1902–1904	Sheffield United	12	(0)
1904–1905	West Ham United		
1905–1906	Tottenham Hotspur		
1906	Manchester United	0	(0)
1906–1907	Reading		
1907	Leicester Fosse	1	(0)
1907	Northern Nomads		
1907	Ilford		
1908	Norwich City		
1909	Sheffield		
Total		13	(0)
- * Club domestic league appearances and goals

Frederick Houghton Milnes (26 January 1878 – 1946) was an English footballer who played in the Football League for Leicester Fosse and Sheffield United.

== Career ==
Milnes was born in Wortley, South Yorkshire and was the son of a wealthy steel company executive. He refused to sign professional contracts with clubs and only signed on amateur forms which allowed him to move freely around the country and play for England national amateur team. He set up his own amateur touring team The Pilgrims F.C. which spent most of their time playing in the United States.
