= London derbies =

Association football derbies based in London

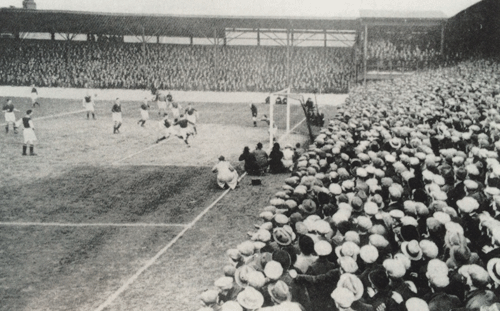
Bitter rivals Millwall and West Ham United playing in the 1930 FA Cup at Upton Park.

London derbies are the various local football derbies between the teams in London, England. It specifically refers to individual matches between the teams, but can also be used to describe the general ongoing rivalry between the clubs and fans. The first London Football League derby took place at Clapton Stadium on 11 November 1905, where Chelsea beat Clapton Orient 3–0 in a Second Division match. Chelsea also won the first top-flight London derby with a 2–1 victory over Woolwich Arsenal (now Arsenal), in a First Division game at Stamford Bridge on 9 November 1907. The first FA Cup Final to be contested between two teams from London was the 1967 Final, where Tottenham Hotspur beat Chelsea 2–1. As of the 2021–22 season, there are thirteen clubs in the Premier League and Football League that play in the Greater London area. Arsenal against Tottenham Hotspur and Millwall against West Ham United are ranked as two of the most ferocious London derbies.

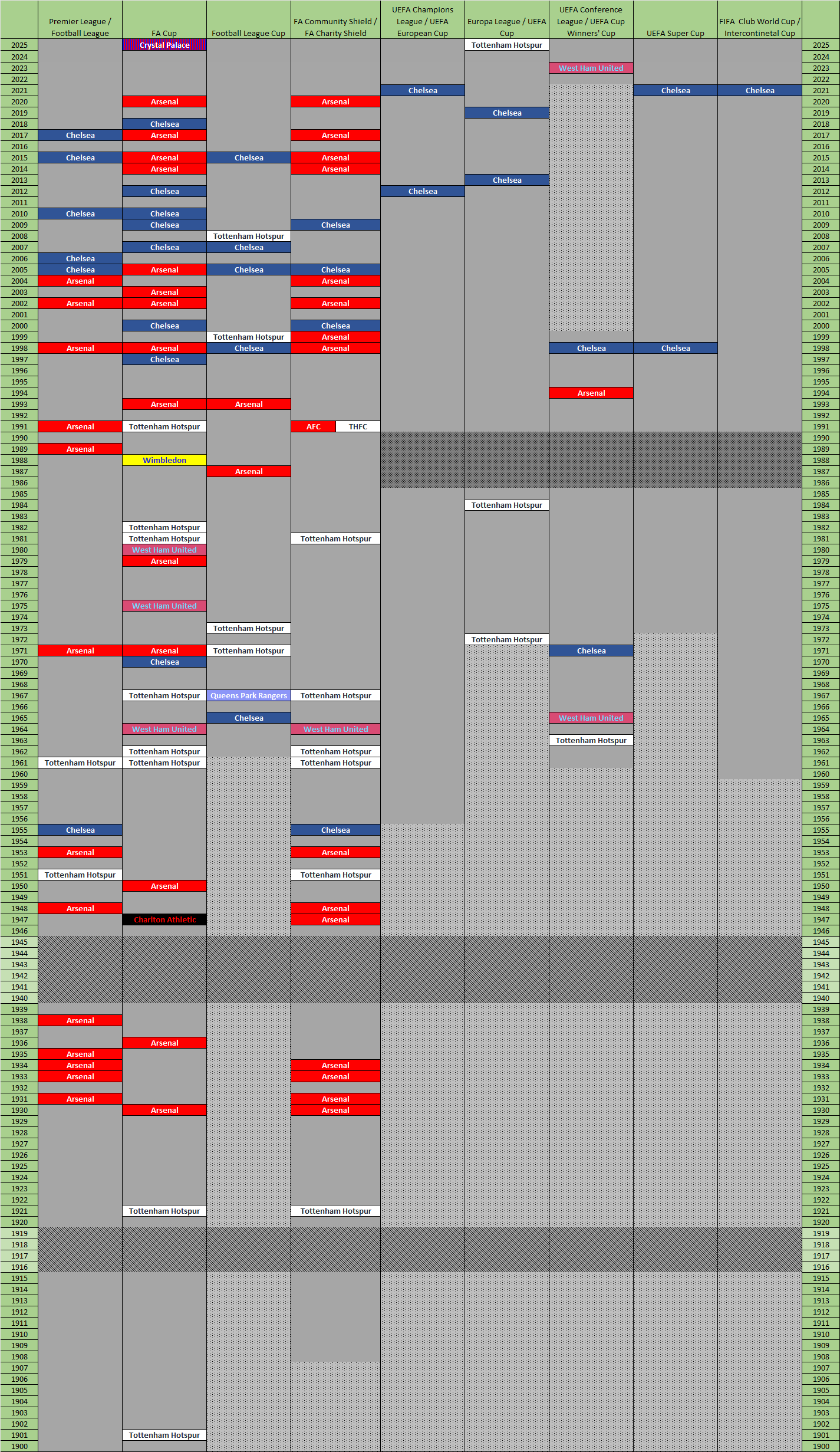
Honours won season by season by football clubs from London

== Clubs in London ==
As of 2026–27 season

Division	Club(s)
Premier League	Arsenal, Brentford, Chelsea, Crystal Palace, Fulham, Tottenham Hotspur
EFL Championship	Charlton Athletic, Millwall, Queens Park Rangers, West Ham United
EFL League One	AFC Wimbledon, Bromley, Leyton Orient
EFL League Two	Barnet
National League	Hornchurch, Sutton United, Wealdstone
National League South	Dagenham & Redbridge, Hampton & Richmond Borough
Seventh tier of English football	Isthmian Premier: Carshalton Athletic, Cray Wanderers, Dulwich Hamlet, Enfield Town, Wingate & Finchley, Cray Valley Paper Mills, Hendon, Welling United; Southern League Premier South: Hanwell Town

Defunct English Football League clubs based in London includes Thames and Wimbledon.

== Major London derbies ==
- North London derby – between Arsenal and Tottenham Hotspur. A rivalry has existed since Arsenal's move to the Highbury area of North London in 1913, and especially since Arsenal's promotion to the First Division in 1919. It is perhaps the most hotly contested of all London derbies, with the two clubs located just 4 miles (6.4 km) away from each other in neighbouring boroughs. They have played each other about 200 times.
- North vs West London derby
  - Arsenal F.C.–Chelsea F.C. rivalry – the oldest top level rivalry between Arsenal of North London and Chelsea of West London, and the most contested London derby. They first met in the First Division in 1907 and have competed more than 200 games together. They have met in all three major domestic competitions and both the Champions League and Europa League.
  - Chelsea F.C.–Tottenham Hotspur F.C. rivalry – a rivalry dating back to their first meeting in 1909, between Chelsea of West London and Tottenham Hotspur of North London. They have played each other just over 160 times.
- Millwall F.C.–West Ham United F.C. rivalry – is a South London vs East London derby between Millwall and West Ham United, also known as the Dockers derby due to the clubs' historical ties to the shipbuilding industry along the Thames. The fixture grew out of a rivalry between competing London dockers and remains fierce (matches have often been marred by violence and hooliganism) despite only being contested infrequently, due to the clubs being in separate divisions for much of their histories. The rivals have played each other 100 times, mostly before World War II. It is perhaps the bitterest of the London rivalries and there have been a number of films portraying it, most notably Green Street.
- Tottenham Hotspur F.C.–West Ham United F.C. rivalry – is a North vs East derby between Tottenham Hotspur and West Ham United. They are separated by only 5 miles (8 km) and have played over 200 games against each other.
- East London derby – any between Leyton Orient, West Ham United and Dagenham & Redbridge, a fixture which, for the same reasons as the Dockers derby, rarely takes place. West Ham and Leyton Orient last met competitively in January 1987, and West Ham and Dagenham & Redbridge have never met since the latter was formed in 1992 from the merger of Redbridge Forest and Dagenham. However, Leyton Orient and Dagenham & Redbridge meet occasionally in the lower leagues.
- South London derby – any between AFC Wimbledon, Charlton Athletic, Crystal Palace, Millwall and Sutton United. Although Millwall's fiercest rivalry is with East Londoners West Ham, they also have a rivalry with their neighbours Crystal Palace and Charlton. The five teams have contested over 300 games between them.
- West London derby – any between Brentford, Chelsea, Fulham and Queens Park Rangers. Brentford, Fulham and Queens Park Rangers share longstanding rivalries with each other. Fulham regard Chelsea as their major rivals, and QPR regard Chelsea as their major rivals, followed by Fulham. However, in more recent years and due to their success in the last 10–15 years, the West London rivalry has not been fully reciprocated by Chelsea fans, who typically regard Arsenal, Tottenham, West Ham and Northern clubs Liverpool, Leeds United and Manchester United as more significant rivals.

== See also ==
- Football in London
