= Martin Ho =

English football manager (born 1990)

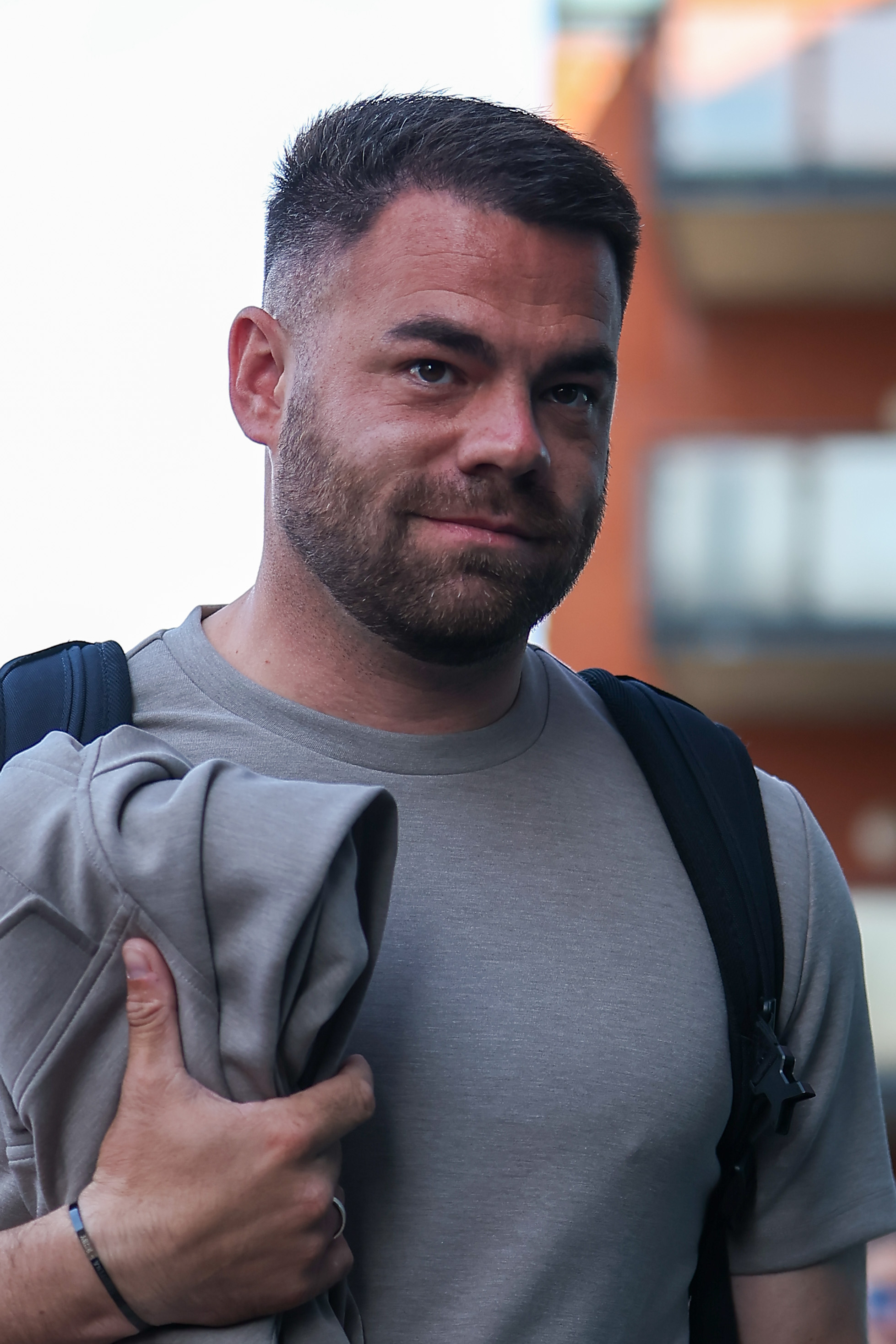
- Ho in 2025

Personal information
- Date of birth: 6 June 1990 (age 36)
- Place of birth: Liverpool, Merseyside, England

Team information
- Current team: Tottenham Hotspur Women (head coach)

Youth career
- Years: Team
- Everton

Managerial career
- 2015–2018: Everton Women (assistant)
- 2020–2023: Manchester United Women (assistant)
- 2023–2025: Brann Women
- 2025–: Tottenham Hotspur Women

Martin Peter Ho (Chinese: [hoʊ]; born 6 June 1990) is an English professional football coach who is currently the head coach of Women's Super League club Tottenham Hotspur.

== Career ==
Born in Liverpool in 1990 to a Chinese father and English mother, Ho started his footballing career as an academy player for Everton, but soon pivoted to a coaching role. From 2015 to 2018 he worked as assistant manager to Andy Spence at Everton Women. Ho then worked as the head coach of Liverpool Women's U21 team, before being given the role as assistant manager at Manchester United Women in 2020.

In 2023 Toppserien club Brann hired Ho as their head coach, replacing Olli Harder. While unable to salvage a disappointing domestic season, Ho achieved success in the 2023–24 UEFA Women's Champions League, leading the team to 2nd in the group stages before going out to eventual champions Barcelona in the quarter-finals.

On 4 July 2025, it was announced that Ho had been appointed as head coach of Women's Super League side Tottenham Hotspur. In March 2026, he signed a "long-term" contract with the club, although the exact length of the agreement was not made public.

== Managerial statistics ==
As of match played 24 October 2026

Managerial record by team and tenure
Team	From	To	Record					Ref.
Team	From	To	P	W	D	L	Win %	Ref.
SK Brann Women	26 August 2023	3 July 2025	71	50	7	14	70.4	
Tottenham Hotspur Women	4 July 2025	present	38	20	4	14	52.6	
Total			109	70	11	28	64.2	
