= Christopher Ward (watchmaker) =

British watch company

Christopher Ward (London) Limited
- Industry: Watchmaking
- Founded: 2004, England
- Founder: Christopher Ward; Mike France; Peter Ellis
- Headquarters: Maidenhead, Berkshire, United Kingdom
- Key people: Mike France, CEO
- Products: Wrist watches
- Website: www.christopherward.co.uk

Christopher Ward (London), founded by Christopher Ward, Mike France and Peter Ellis in 2004, is a British watch company. It was the first online-only luxury watch retailer selling timepieces directly to the consumer.However the company now offers in-person retail at any of their showrooms.Christopher Ward also won "British Watch Brand of the Year" in the WatchPro Awards 2025.

Christopher Ward watches are designed in England and manufactured in Switzerland.

In 2015, The Sunday Times ranked Christopher Ward as 77th in the SME Export Track 100; the only watch company on the list.

In January 2020, co-founder Christopher Ward left the business. His involvement in a new watch brand, TRIBUS, was announced in September 2020. TRIBUS ceased operations and filed for insolvency in the summer of 2022.

== History ==
=== Founding ===
Christopher Ward was founded in 2004 by Mike France, Christopher Ward, and Peter Ellis during a brainstorming session on a boat on the River Thames. The company launched with a direct-to-consumer model aimed at reducing traditional retail margins and offering Swiss-made watches at more accessible prices. Christopher Ward released its first watch in 2005. By December of that year, the brand was receiving more mentions than Rolex on TimeZone, a major online watch forum.

=== Merger ===
In 2014, Christopher Ward merged with its Swiss manufacturing partner Synergies Horlogères SA to form Christopher Ward London Holdings Ltd. The same year, the company released its first in-house movement, the Calibre SH21, developed by watchmaker Johannes Jahnke. The SH21 featured a five-day power reserve and COSC chronometer certification. The release was described by industry observers as “probably the most important development by a British watch brand in the past 50 years.”

=== Departure of Christopher Ward ===
In January 2020, co-founder Christopher Ward left the company. Later that year, he launched a separate watch brand, TRIBUS, alongside his three sons. The company continued operating under its existing leadership and structure following Ward's departure.

== Business model ==
From its launch in 2004, Christopher Ward positioned itself as the "world's first exclusively online luxury watch brand", eliminating traditional retail markups by selling directly to consumers. By cutting distribution and marketing costs, the company offers competitive pricing and higher technical value.

Sales are conducted exclusively via company-owned channels— online and telephone sales—with physical showrooms in the UK and US. An earlier showroom in Nashua, New Hampshire was closed in March 2016. On 16 September 2024, Christopher Ward opened a new US showroom in Frisco, Texas. Christopher Ward has 6 showrooms as of 18 February 2026 in London, Maidenhead, Liverpool, New York, Frisco & Falls Church.

Customer support is managed remotely: customers submit service requests via the website, after which watches are sent to the company’s service centre for evaluation and repair.

A hallmark of its direct‑to‑consumer model is the "60|60 guarantee", offering a 60-day return policy and a 60‑month movement warranty on purchases made through its official channels.

Financial performance has accelerated rapidly in recent years. For the year ending 31 March 2020, the company reported £10 million in revenue (up 19%) and produced approximately 20,000 watches. By mid‑2021, sales had topped £15 million—a 30% increase year‑on‑year.

Fiscal year 2024 (to 31 March 2024) saw a major leap: turnover reached £30.5 million (vs £16.8 million in 2023), while pre‑tax profit rose from £222,000 to £3.9 million. The company’s growth was attributed to the popularity of models such as the C1 Bel Canto and The Twelve.

== In-house movements ==
In July 2014, Christopher Ward unveiled its first in-house watch movement, the Calibre SH21, following a merger with its Swiss manufacturing partner, Synergies Horlogères SA. The launch of the SH21 marked the first commercially viable mechanical movement introduced by a British watch brand in over 50 years.

The SH21 was conceived by master watchmaker Johannes Jahnke and developed in Biel, Switzerland. Its design was intended to provide both high performance and long-term versatility across complications. Notable features include:

- a five-day (120-hour) power reserve via twin barrels
- COSC chronometer certification
- a modular architecture supporting automatic or hand-wound variants, with optional complications including date, small seconds, and power reserve display

The first watch powered by SH21 was the C9 Harrison 5-Day Automatic, released in 2014. Since then, the movement has appeared in models across the Christopher Ward lineup, including skeletonized and limited-edition variations. The C60 Concept (2021), for example, featured a fully skeletonized version of the SH21 as a demonstration of the company's design and engineering capabilities.

Watch media has widely credited SH21 as a turning point for the company and for modern British watchmaking. Publications like Fratello Watches and Chrono24 described it as one of the most important technical achievements by a British brand in decades.

== Logo ==
Christopher Ward has revised its logo multiple times since its founding.

The original logo, used from the brand's inception in 2005, featured a stylized monogram with the letter "W" enclosed in a large "C", typically accompanied by the text "Christopher Ward London" beneath it.The logo could also be the international flag codes X-Ray and Romeo (X and R) the first two letters of Christopher in Greek.

The second version, introduced around 2011, presented a more typographic approach: the abbreviated wordmark "Chr.Ward", sometimes including the word "London". The design aimed to evoke a traditional British character but did not gain lasting popularity.

In 2016, the company underwent a major rebranding, introducing a clean sans-serif wordmark of the full name "Christopher Ward", along with a new emblem: a "twin flags" logo. This emblem combines elements of the St George's Cross (England) and the Swiss flag, symbolizing the brand's Anglo-Swiss identity. Alongside the design update, the logo's dial placement was shifted from the 9 o'clock position to 12 o’clock.

Over time, the brand began phasing out the wordmark from the dial entirely, leaving only the twin-flags emblem as the primary identifier on many watches. The company has stated its aim for the symbol to be recognizable on its own—similar to other iconic watch brands.

== Models ==
Christopher Ward organizes its watch offerings into several core collections based on design inspiration and intended use. Each collection includes multiple models that share design characteristics and often feature variations in case size, dial color, and complications.

=== Sport ===
The company's sport category is centered around the C63 Sealander line, introduced in 2020 as a range of everyday tool watches. Designed with versatility in mind, the Sealander models are built for general use and come in several formats including automatic, GMT, and bronze editions. In 2023, Christopher Ward launched The Twelve, an integrated bracelet sports watch featuring an angular case and textured dial, inspired by high-end 1970s sports watches.

=== Dive ===
The company's dive watches are primarily represented by the C60 Trident collection, a range of modern diver's watches with a minimum of 300 m water resistance and ceramic bezels. The flagship C60 Trident Pro serves as the core diver’s model, while the C60 Elite 1000—crafted in titanium—features a 1000 m depth rating and helium release valve. Heritage-style diving designs are offered through models like the C65 Aquitaine, which evokes the design of mid-20th century divers, notably the Blancpain Fifty Fathoms.

=== Retro ===
The C65 collection, introduced in 2016, forms the basis of Christopher Ward's retro category. These watches are inspired by mid-century field and dive watches and use vintage design cues like box sapphire crystals and "Old Radium"-style lume. The C65 Dune, released in 2023, is a notable model within this range and is designed as a compact, outdoors-oriented retro field watch. The C65 Super Compressor, introduced in 2020, revives a vintage EPSA-style compression case that uses water pressure to tighten the seals.

=== Military ===
Christopher Ward launched its Military Collection in 2019 through a licensing agreement with the UK Ministry of Defence. The range includes the C65 Sandhurst Series 2 (British Army), C65 Dartmouth (Royal Navy) [not currently sold] and C65 Cranwell Series 2 (Royal Air Force), each inspired by mid-century British military-issue watches. These models feature heritage designs, COSC chronometer-certified movements, and display each branch's insignia on the caseback.

Later military-inspired additions include the C60 Lympstone, honouring the Royal Marines with a rugged, tactical diver's design, and the C63 Colchester, a lightweight carbon watch designed in collaboration with the British Army's Parachute Regiment.This also includes the C63 Valour which is a quartz chronograph that includes the heraldic insignia of the British Army, Royal Navy and the Royal Air Force.

=== Notable Complications and Innovations ===
Outside of its primary categories, Christopher Ward has developed several technically ambitious models. The most notable is the C1 Bel Canto, a chiming watch with a "sonnerie au passage" complication, which strikes the hour automatically. Released in 2022, it was one of the most affordable mechanical chiming watches available upon its debut. In November 2026, Christopher Ward launched Bel Canto Lumiere transforming the GPHG winner into a spectacle of light. The new model has luminescence ring and bracelet.

The development was led by Jorg Bader Jr. (Product Director) alongside Frank Stelzer (Technical Director) and Adrian Buchmann (Design Director) and Will Brackfield (Watch Designer). This was a three-year project and it shows.

Other models include the C1 Moonglow, which features a moonphase complication with dual 3D moon discs beneath a translucent sapphire dial, and the C12 Loco, introduced in 2023 to debut the brand's new in-house manual-wind movement, the Calibre CW-003. The movement features 144 hours of power reserve and visible finishing.

== Sponsorships and programs ==
=== CW Challenger Programme ===
Christopher Ward launched the Challenger Programme in 2013 to support individuals undertaking ambitious ventures. The initiative began when a group of recent graduates sought sponsorship for an expedition to summit an unclimbed peak in the Pamir Mountains of Tajikistan. The team successfully completed the climb and named the 4,922 m summit Mount Christopher Ward—reportedly the first mountain in the world named after a watch brand.

The programme has since expanded to support emerging athletes and creatives. Notable participants include Amber Hill, a skeet shooter who became Britain's youngest ever senior world cup gold medallist; Will Satch, an Olympic gold-medalist rower; and Samantha Kinghorn, a Paralympic wheelchair racer. These athletes were supported by the brand early in their careers, reflecting Christopher Ward's focus on ambition and resilience.

=== Premiership Rugby ===
In May 2023, Christopher Ward became the official timekeeping partner of the Gallagher Premiership, England’s top-tier professional rugby union league. As part of the agreement, the Christopher Ward logo appears on stadium shot clocks and other official timing equipment. The brand described the sponsorship as part of its broader effort to reach a wider sporting audience.

=== Everton F.C. ===
Christopher Ward became the official global timing partner of Everton F.C. in 2022 and expanded the agreement in 2024 to become the club's sleeve sponsor for the 2024–25 season—Everton’s final year at Goodison Park. The company also became a founding partner of Everton's new stadium at Bramley-Moore Dock, opened in 2025. The partnership includes a dedicated showroom and branded hospitality space inside the new venue, a first-of-its-kind integration for a luxury watchmaker.

=== Other partnerships ===
In 2021, Christopher Ward partnered with Team BRIT, a British racing team composed of drivers with physical and psychological disabilities aiming to compete at Le Mans. The brand provided timekeeping support and featured its logo on the team's vehicles.
