= Eder Maestre =

Spanish football manager (born 1986)

- Maestre in 2026

Personal information
- Full name: Eder Maestre Eguia
- Date of birth: 15 April 1986 (age 40)
- Place of birth: Spain

Managerial career
- Years: Team
- 2024–2025: UD Tenerife
- 2026–: London City Lionesses

Eder Maestre Eguia (born 15 April 1986) is a Spanish football manager who is the head coach of the Women's Super League team London City Lionesses.

== Early life ==
Maestre was born on 15 April 1986 in Spain. Growing up, he studied engineering.

== Career ==
Ahead of the 2024–25 season, Maestre was appointed manager of Spanish side UD Tenerife, helping the club achieve sixth place in the league during that season. Following his stint there, he was appointed manager of English side London City Lionesses in 2026.
