= Chelsea F.C.–Tottenham Hotspur F.C. rivalry =

Rivalry between two English football clubs

Chelsea v Tottenham Hotspur
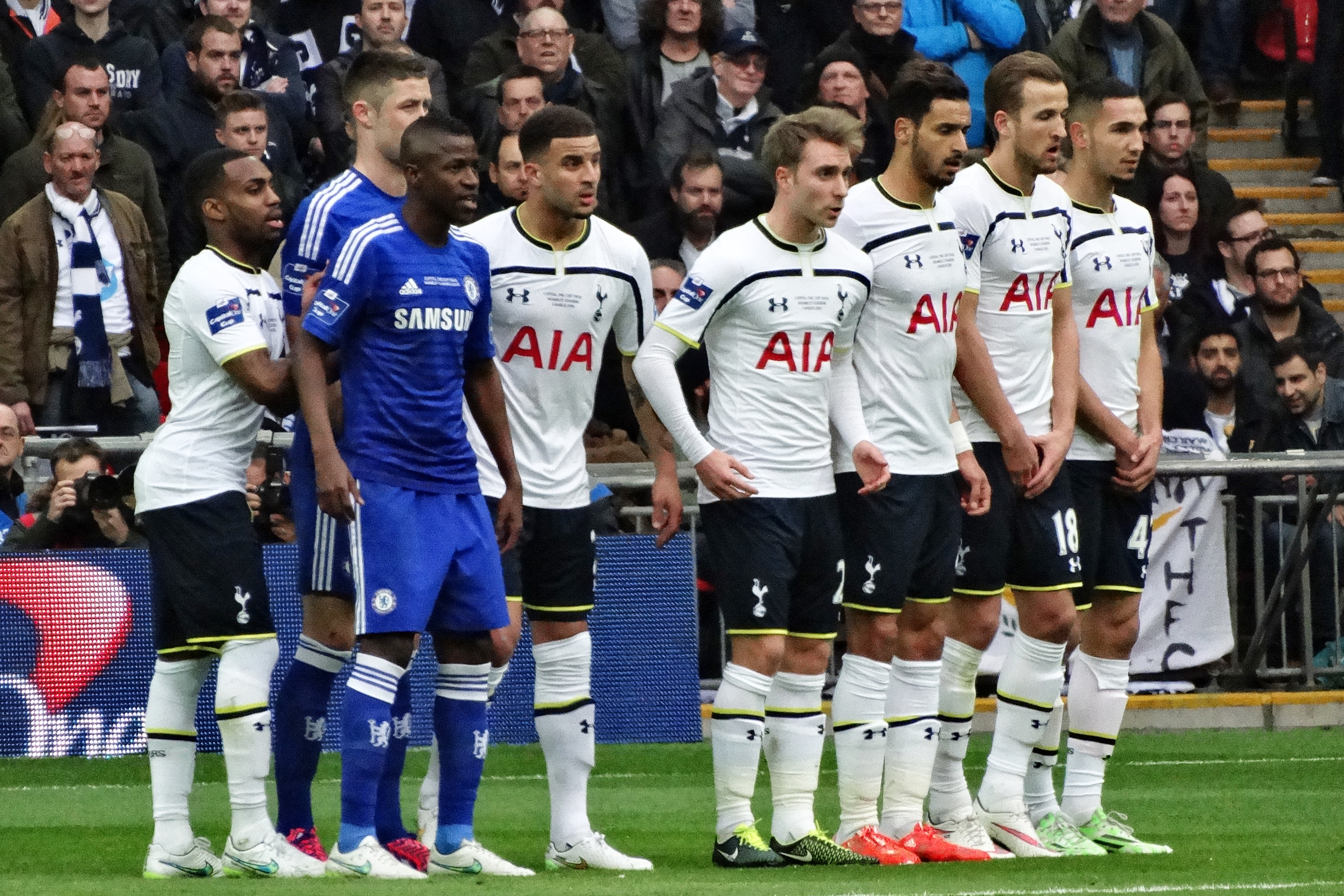
- Chelsea and Tottenham Hotspur contesting the 2015 Football League Cup final.
- Location: London
- Teams: Chelsea; Tottenham Hotspur
- First meeting: 18 December 1909; First Division; Chelsea 2–1 Tottenham
- Latest meeting: 24 October 2026; Premier League; Chelsea 0–2 Tottenham
- Next meeting: 8 May 2027; Premier League; Tottenham v Chelsea
- Stadiums: Stamford Bridge; Tottenham Hotspur Stadium

Statistics
- Total meetings: 182
- Most wins: Chelsea (83)
- Top scorer: Jimmy Floyd Hasselbaink (12)
- All-time series: Chelsea: 83; Drawn: 43; Tottenham: 56
- Largest victory: Tottenham 5–0 Chelsea; First Division (9 October 1920); Tottenham 1–6 Chelsea; FA Premier League (6 December 1997)
- Location of the two teams' stadiums in London

The Chelsea F.C.–Tottenham Hotspur F.C. rivalry is a rivalry between London-based professional association football clubs Chelsea and Tottenham Hotspur. Chelsea play their home games at Stamford Bridge, while Tottenham Hotspur play their home games at the Tottenham Hotspur Stadium. As of October 2026, 182 competitive games have been played between the two teams, 83 of which were won by Chelsea and 56 by Spurs.

Although both teams have played against each other since the early 20th century, the rivalry between Chelsea and Tottenham did not begin until the 1967 FA Cup final, the first all-London FA Cup final. Chelsea fans consider Tottenham to be one of their rivals alongside Arsenal, Fulham and Leeds United, while Tottenham fans consider their rivalry with Chelsea to be secondary to that with Arsenal. Many encounters between the two teams have been highly intense, including a match dubbed the 'Battle of the Bridge' in 2016.

== Background ==
While Chelsea and Tottenham Hotspur never considered each other primary rivals, there has always been strong needle between the fans dating back to the 1967 FA Cup final. Matches between the two teams would often attract large attendances and would sometimes end up in violent clashes between supporters.

A 2012 survey has shown that Chelsea fans consider Tottenham to be their main rival, above Arsenal and Manchester United. In the same survey, it is shown that Tottenham fans still consider Chelsea their second rival, below Arsenal. The 2004 film The Football Factory depicted scenes of the two teams' fans violently clashing.

== History ==
=== Early matches ===
The first league meeting between the two teams took place on 18 December 1909 at Stamford Bridge as Tottenham only joined the Football League in 1908 and won promotion to the Football League First Division in 1909. The match was won by Chelsea 2–1. Both teams however struggled in the 1909–10 season, and they met again at White Hart Lane on 30 April 1910 in the final match of season, with both fighting for survival in Division One. Spurs beat Chelsea 2–1, sending Chelsea down, with the winning goal scored by former Chelsea player Percy Humphreys.

=== Start of rivalry ===
The rivalry between the two teams dates back to the 1967 FA Cup final, which was the competition's first final to be contested between two teams from London, and is thus often dubbed the "Cockney Cup Final". Tottenham won the game 2–1 with over 100,000 people in attendance.

The rivalry was further ignited during the 1974–75 season, one in which Tottenham and Chelsea fought out a bitter battle against relegation from the First Division. Before the match, Tottenham were in the relegation zone and Chelsea were one point ahead of them. The tension of the match led to fans invading and fighting on the pitch before the game started. After a delayed start, Tottenham won the game 2–0. Chelsea failed to win either of their remaining two games and were ultimately relegated from the First Division with Tottenham staying up via a solitary point.

=== 1990–2015 ===
Chelsea became dominant in the meetings with Tottenham in the 1990s; starting from December 1990 they were unbeaten by their rivals for over a decade, including a 6–1 win at White Hart Lane in the 1997–98 season. On 5 November 2006, Tottenham beat Chelsea 2–1 at White Hart Lane, ending a 16-year period without victory against the Blues in the league. Spurs did, however, beat Chelsea in 2002 during a 5–1 win in the second leg of the league cup after a 2–1 defeat at Stamford Bridge, resulting in an aggregate score of 6–3.

On 11 March 2007, Chelsea and Tottenham met in the FA Cup quarter-finals, with Chelsea coming to 3–3 down from 1–3 and earning a replay. The next day, hooligans of Tottenham and Chelsea clashed in the streets of London, a fight in which 10 fans were knifed. Chelsea eventually won the replay by 2–1, progressing in the semi-finals. In the next season, the two sides met in the 2008 Football League Cup final, with Tottenham winning the trophy after a 2–1 victory.

Prior to signing for Chelsea in 2013, Willian had attracted interest from Tottenham. He completed a medical at Tottenham before meeting with Chelsea, which caused confusion as to which club he would sign for. Willian claims Chelsea was his first preference and he would have only signed with Tottenham if the deal with Chelsea fell through. It is alleged that during Roman Abramovich's tenure as Chelsea owner, he refused to do any business with Tottenham.

On 1 March 2015, Chelsea won the 2015 Football League Cup final 2–0 against Tottenham, with goals provided by John Terry and Diego Costa. Chelsea fans made headlines for racist and anti-Semitic chants on the Underground after the match. After this final, Chelsea surpassed Tottenham in number of trophies won.

=== 2016: 'Battle of the Bridge' ===
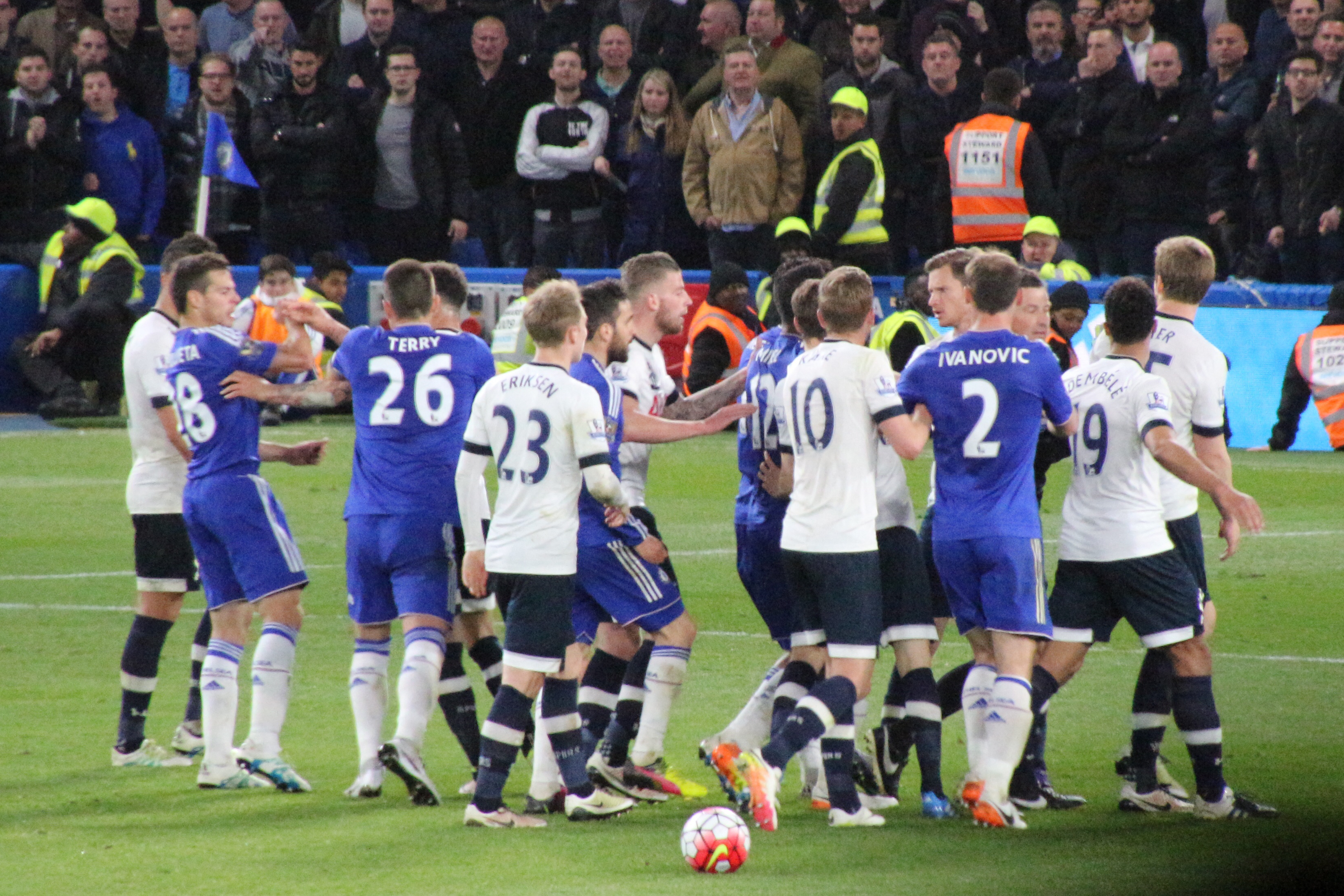
Scuffling between players at the match between Chelsea and Spurs dubbed the 'Battle of Stamford Bridge' on 2 May 2016.

In the 2015–16 season, Tottenham's league performance improved under their manager Mauricio Pochettino, and they were a contender for the title. Chelsea on the other hand had their worst season in 20 years which saw their manager José Mourinho sacked after a bad start to the season. Tottenham headed into the match against Chelsea at Stamford Bridge on 2 May 2016, a match that Tottenham needed to win to have a chance at winning the league. The encounter proved to be an ill-tempered match, which would later be called the 'Battle of Stamford Bridge' or 'Battle of the Bridge'.

Tottenham took the lead with two goals scored by Harry Kane and Son Heung-min. In the second half, Gary Cahill and Eden Hazard scored the two goals for Chelsea. It ended as a 2–2 draw which automatically gave Leicester City their first ever Premier League title. This was arguably the closest Tottenham had come to winning the league since their last title in 1961 and since their last third-place finish in 1990. The match saw many altercations between players and benches on and off the field, especially after Hazard scored the equalising and final goal. Mark Clattenburg, who refereed the game, subsequently stated that he could have "sent three players off from Tottenham" but chose instead to allow them to play on, giving the team a total of nine yellow cards (a Premier League record for any team), so as to allow them to "self destruct" and have no one else to blame but themselves. There were also three yellow cards for Chelsea, and Mousa Dembélé received a six-match suspension for violent conduct. As a result, both clubs had to face three FA charges and they were fined for failing to control their players.

=== 2017–present ===
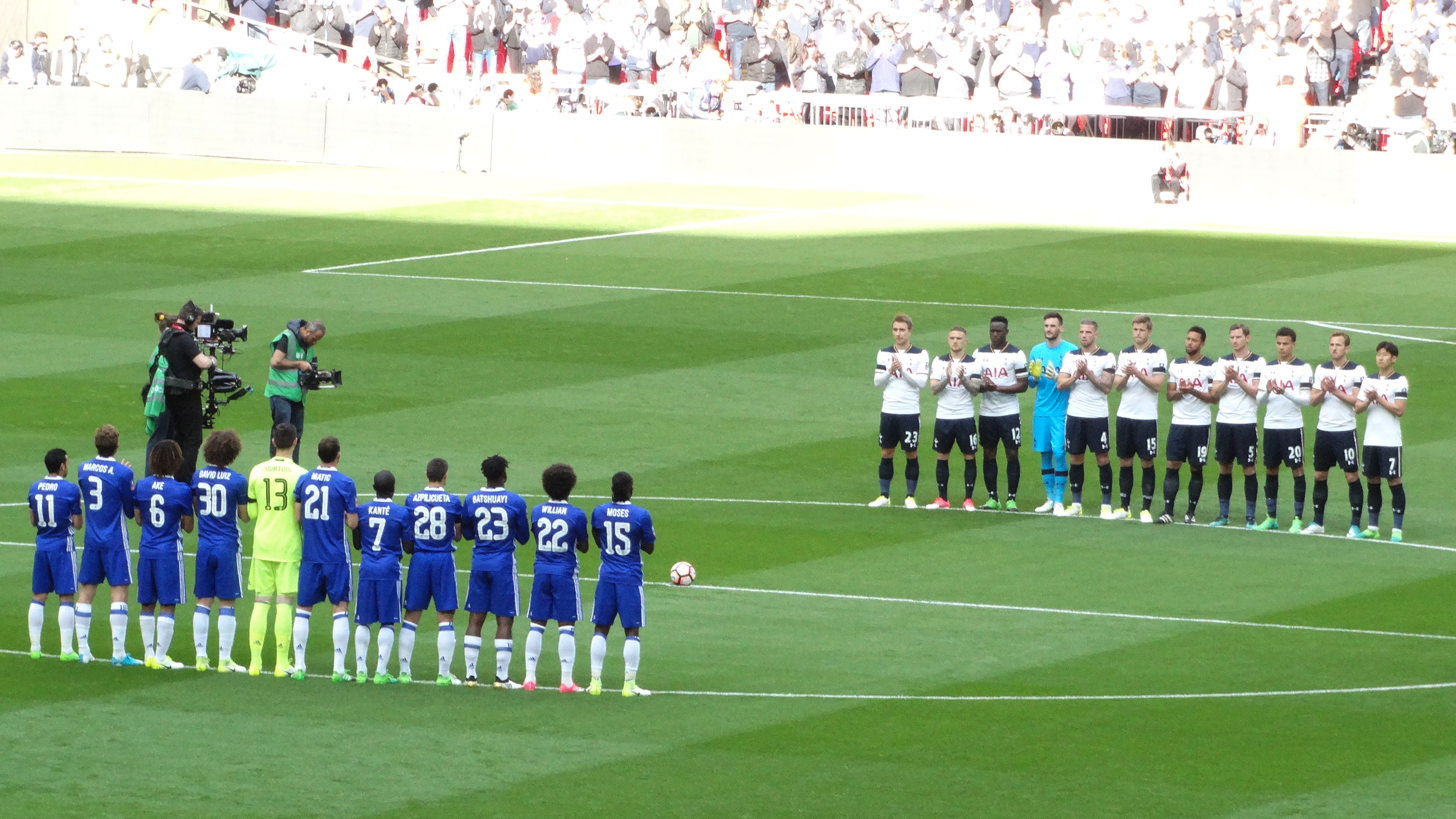
Chelsea and Tottenham players before the FA Cup semi-final in 2017.

On 4 January 2017, Tottenham beat Chelsea 2–0 at White Hart Lane, ending Chelsea's record 13-game winning streak in the Premier League. It brought Tottenham to within five points of Chelsea, who were leading the Premier League. Tottenham and Chelsea then went on to be the two title rivals in what was a two-horse race for the title, in which Chelsea eventually prevailed with 93 points to Tottenham's 86 points. Tottenham also lost to Chelsea in the FA Cup semi-final in the same season.

On 20 August 2017, Tottenham and Chelsea met early in the 2017–18 Premier League season, with Tottenham playing their first-ever home Premier League match at Wembley Stadium. Chelsea won the match 2–1 with two goals scored by Marcos Alonso, ending Tottenham's 19-game home Premier League unbeaten run. In the same season on 1 April 2018, Tottenham won away to Chelsea 3–1, with goals from Dele Alli and Christian Eriksen. This was Tottenham's first win in 28 years at Stamford Bridge.

On 22 December 2019, Chelsea played their first match at Tottenham's new stadium. The match, which Chelsea won 2–0 with a brace by Willian, received wide media coverage due to alleged racist behaviour by Tottenham fans, aimed at Chelsea's defender Antonio Rüdiger. A Chelsea supporter was also arrested for alleged racist abuse against Spurs player Son Heung-min, who was sent off for kicking Rüdiger after he fouled Son. It led to a call for government action on racism in football. However, no evidence of racist abuse against Rüdiger was found after a police investigation.

On 5 January 2022, Chelsea took on Tottenham in the League Cup semi-final first leg at Stamford Bridge, and won the match 2–0. A week later, Chelsea again beat Tottenham 1–0 in the second leg, booking a spot at Wembley for the final. On 23 January, Chelsea faced Tottenham again in a 2–0 win in the Premier League. The win meant that Chelsea had beaten Tottenham three times in the space of a month—the last Premier League team to achieve this feat was Aston Villa against Blackburn Rovers in January 2010.

A Premier League match at Stamford Bridge on 14 August 2022 was notable for having both Chelsea's manager Thomas Tuchel and Spurs manager Antonio Conte, who previously managed Chelsea, sent off. This followed multiple altercations between them on the touchline, initially when Conte celebrated in front of Tuchel following a Spurs equaliser, and later when both managers clashed whilst shaking hands after the final whistle. The match resulted in a 2–2 draw following a 96th minute equaliser from Spurs striker Kane.

The Premier League clash between the two teams that took place on 6 November 2023 has been described as "chaotic", "madness", and one of the "wildest", "most frenetic and mesmeric" games in Premier League history. The match saw the return of former Tottenham manager Pochettino to Tottenham Stadium as manager of Chelsea, and there were five disallowed goals (four in one half), six yellow cards (Tottenham's manager Ange Postecoglou received one), two Tottenham players sent off, and 11 major VAR checks, which added 21 minutes to the game in stoppage time. It ended in 4–1 home defeat for Tottenham with Nicolas Jackson scoring a hat-trick, but the home team and manager Postecoglou still received a standing ovation from their fans at the end.

== Players who have played for or managed both teams ==
Below are the players and managers who played for or managed both clubs.

=== Chelsea, then Tottenham ===
- (England) Ted Birnie (as player: Chelsea 1906–1909; Tottenham 1910)
- (England) Percy Humphreys (as player: Chelsea 1907–1909; Tottenham 1909–1911)
- (England) Billy Brawn (as player: Chelsea 1907–1911; Tottenham 1918)
- (England) Bill Cartwright (as player: Chelsea 1908–1912; Tottenham 1913)
- (England) Buchanan Sharp (as player: Chelsea 1919–1923; Tottenham 1923–1925)
- (England) Harry Wilding (as player: Chelsea 1919–1928; Tottenham 1928)
- (England) Jimmy Armstrong (as player: Chelsea 1922–1925; Tottenham 1927–1929)
- (England) Bobby Smith (as player: Chelsea 1950–1955; Tottenham 1955–1964)
- (England) Les Allen (as player: Chelsea 1954–1959; Tottenham 1959–1965)
- (England) Jimmy Greaves (as player: Chelsea 1957–1961; Tottenham 1961–1970)
- (England) Terry Venables (as player: Chelsea 1960–1966; Tottenham 1966–1969; as manager: Tottenham 1987–1991)
- (Scotland) George Graham (as player: Chelsea 1964–1966; as manager: Tottenham 1998–2001)
- (Scotland) Gordon Durie (as player: Chelsea 1986–1991; Tottenham 1991–1993)
- (England) Clive Wilson (as player: Chelsea 1987–1990; Tottenham 1995–1999)
- (England) Jason Cundy (as player: Chelsea 1988–1992; Tottenham 1992–1996)
- (England) Dave Beasant (as player: Chelsea 1989–1993; Tottenham 2001)
- (Norway) Frode Grodås (as player: Chelsea 1996–1998; Tottenham 1998)
- (Uruguay) Gus Poyet (as player: Chelsea 1997–2001; Tottenham 2001–2004)
- (Italy) Carlo Cudicini (as player: Chelsea 1999–2009; Tottenham 2009–2012)
- (Iceland) Eiður Guðjohnsen (as player: Chelsea 2000–2006; Tottenham 2010)
- (France) William Gallas (as player: Chelsea 2001–2006; Tottenham 2010–2013)
- (England) Scott Parker (as player: Chelsea 2004–2005; Tottenham 2011–2013)
- (Portugal) José Mourinho (as manager: Chelsea 2004–2007, 2013–2015; Tottenham 2019–2021)
- (Portugal) André Villas-Boas (as manager: Chelsea 2011–2012; Tottenham 2012–2013)
- (Italy) Antonio Conte (as manager: Chelsea 2016–2018; Tottenham 2022–2023)
- (Germany) Timo Werner (as player: Chelsea 2020–2022; Tottenham 2024–2025)
- (England) Dominic Solanke (as player: Chelsea 2014–2017; Tottenham 2024–present)
- (England) Conor Gallagher (as player: Chelsea 2019–2024; Tottenham 2026–present)
- (England) Tosin Adarabioyo (as player: Chelsea 2024–2026; Tottenham 2026–present)
- (Ukraine) Mykhailo Mudryk (as player: Chelsea 2023–present; Tottenham 2026–present)

=== Tottenham, then Chelsea ===
- (England) David Copeland (as player: Tottenham 1899–1905; Chelsea 1905–1906)
- (England) Jack Kirwan (as player: Tottenham 1899–1905; Chelsea 1905–1908)
- (England) Vivian Woodward (as player: Tottenham 1901–1909; Chelsea 1909–1915)
- (England) Sid Castle (as player: Tottenham 1919–1920; Chelsea 1923–1924)
- (England) Dick Foss (as player: Tottenham 1932–1933; Chelsea 1936–1948)
- (England) John Harris (as player: Tottenham 1939; Chelsea 1945–1956)
- (England) Sid Tickridge (as player: Tottenham 1946–1951; Chelsea 1951–1952)
- (England) Tommy Harmer (as player: Tottenham 1951–1960; Chelsea 1962–1963)
- (England) Johnny Brooks (as player: Tottenham 1953–1959; Chelsea 1959–1961)
- (Northern Ireland) Danny Blanchflower (as player: Tottenham 1954–1965; as manager: Chelsea 1978–1979)
- (England) Keith Weller (as player: Tottenham 1964–1967; Chelsea 1970–1971)
- (England) Glenn Hoddle (as player: Tottenham 1975–1987; Chelsea 1993–1995; as manager: Chelsea 1993–1996; Tottenham 2001–2003)
- (England) Colin Lee (as player: Tottenham 1977–1980; Chelsea 1980–1987)
- (England) Micky Hazard (as player: Tottenham 1978–1985; Chelsea 1985–1990)
- (England) Mark Falco (as player: Tottenham 1978–1986; Chelsea 1982)
- (England) Graham Roberts (as player: Tottenham 1980–1986; Chelsea 1988–1990)
- (England) Clive Allen (as player: Tottenham 1984–1988; Chelsea 1991–1992)
- (Scotland) Neil Sullivan (as player: Tottenham 2000–2003; Chelsea 2003–2004)
- (Argentina) Mauricio Pochettino (as manager: Tottenham 2014–2019; Chelsea 2023–2024)

== Head-to-head record ==
As of 24 October 2026

Competition	Matches	Chelsea wins	Draws	Tottenham wins
League	157	70	38	49
FA Cup	12	6	2	4
League Cup	13	7	3	3
Total	182	83	43	56

== Honours ==
List of honours won by Chelsea and Tottenham Hotspur
International competitions	Chelsea	Tottenham Hotspur
UEFA Champions League	2	0
UEFA Cup / UEFA Europa League	2	3
UEFA Cup Winners' Cup	2	1
UEFA Conference League	1	0
UEFA Super Cup	2	0
FIFA Club World Cup	2	0
National competitions	Chelsea	Tottenham Hotspur
First Division / Premier League	6	2
FA Cup	8	8
League Cup	5	4
FA Community Shield	4	7
Total	34	25

== Highest attendances ==
- 100,000, Tottenham 2–1 Chelsea, 20 May 1967, FA Cup, Wembley
- 89,294, Chelsea 2–0 Tottenham, 1 March 2015, Football League Cup, Wembley
- 87,660, Chelsea 1–2 Tottenham, 24 February 2008, Football League Cup, Wembley
- 86,355, Chelsea 4–2 Tottenham, 22 April 2017, FA Cup, Wembley
- 85,731, Tottenham 1–5 Chelsea, 15 April 2012, FA Cup, Wembley
- 76,000, Chelsea 0–4 Tottenham, 16 October 1920, First Division, Stamford Bridge
- 73,587, Tottenham 1–2 Chelsea, 20 August 2017, Premier League, Wembley
- 70,123, Chelsea 2–0 Tottenham, 8 January 1964, FA Cup, Stamford Bridge
- 66,398, Tottenham 4–0 Chelsea, 26 January 1957, FA Cup, White Hart Lane
- 61,726, Tottenham 1–4 Chelsea, 6 November 2023, Premier League, Tottenham Hotspur Stadium

== See also ==
- North London derby
- West London derby
- Arsenal F.C.–Chelsea F.C. rivalry
- Tottenham Hotspur F.C.–West Ham United F.C. rivalry
