= Brisbane Roar FC end of season awards =

The Brisbane Roar End of Season Awards are the individual awards won by players of the Australian football club, Brisbane Roar, who compete in each of the A-League, National Youth League and W-League competitions. These awards are presented annually at the club's presentation night following the completion of the A-League season.

== A-League Men ==
=== Gary Wilkins Medal (Player of the Year) ===
Year	Player
2005–06	(South Korea) Seo Hyuk-su
2006–07	(Australia) Matt McKay
2007–08	(Australia) Craig Moore
2008–09	(Australia) Craig Moore
2009–10	(Australia) Luke DeVere
2010–11	(Germany) Thomas Broich
2011–12	(Albania) Besart Berisha
2012–13	(Germany) Thomas Broich
2013–14	(Germany) Thomas Broich
2014–15	(Australia) Matt McKay
2015–16	(Spain) Corona
2016–17	(Australia) Corey Brown
2017–18	(England) Jamie Young
2018–19	(England) Jamie Young
2019–20	(England) Macaulay Gillesphey
2020–21	(Republic of Ireland) Jay O'Shea
2021–22	(Republic of Ireland) Jay O'Shea
2022–23	(Scotland) Tom Aldred
2023–24	(Australia) Macklin Freke
2024–25	(Republic of Ireland) Jay O'Shea
2025–26	(Australia) Sam Klein

=== Player's Player Award ===
Year	Player
2005–06	(South Korea) Seo Hyuk-su (Australia) Alex Brosque
2006–07	(Australia) Matt McKay
2007–08	(Australia) Craig Moore
2008–09	(Australia) Craig Moore
2009–10	(Australia) Luke DeVere
2010–11	(Australia) Matt McKay
2011–12	(Albania) Besart Berisha
2012–13	(Albania) Besart Berisha
2013–14	(Germany) Thomas Broich
2014–15	(Australia) Brandon Borrello
2015–16	(Australia) Jamie Maclaren
2016–17	(Australia) Jamie Maclaren
2017–18	(England) Jamie Young
2018–19	(France) Éric Bauthéac
2019–20	(Republic of Ireland) Jay O'Shea
2020–21	(Republic of Ireland) Jay O'Shea
2021–22	(Republic of Ireland) Jay O'Shea
2022–23	(Republic of Ireland) Jay O'Shea
2023–24	(Republic of Ireland) Jay O'Shea
2024–25	(Republic of Ireland) Jay O'Shea
2025–26	(Australia) Sam Klein

=== Member's Player of the Year ===
Year	Player
2005–06	(Australia) Alex Brosque
2006–07	(Australia) Matt McKay
2007–08	(Australia) Danny Tiatto
2008–09	(Australia) Craig Moore
2009–10	(Australia) Luke DeVere
2010–11	(Australia) Matt McKay
2011–12	(Albania) Besart Berisha
2012–13	(Australia) Ivan Franjic
2013–14	(Germany) Thomas Broich
2015–16	(Australia) Jamie Maclaren

=== Golden Boot ===
Year	Player	Goals
2005–06	(Australia) Alex Brosque	8
2006–07	(Australia) Dario Vidosic	5
2007–08	(Brazil) Reinaldo	9
2008–09	(Indonesia) Sergio Van Dijk	12
2009–10	(Indonesia) Sergio Van Dijk	13
2010–11	(New Zealand) Kosta Barbarouses	12
2011–12	(Albania) Besart Berisha	21
2012–13	(Albania) Besart Berisha	14
2013–14	(Albania) Besart Berisha	11
2014–15	(Brazil) Henrique	8
2015–16	(Australia) Jamie Maclaren	20
2016–17	(Australia) Jamie Maclaren	20
2017–18	(Italy) Massimo Maccarone	9
2018–19	(Australia) Adam Taggart	11
2019–20	(Australia) Scott McDonald (Republic of Ireland) Roy O'Donovan	6
2020–21	(Japan) Riku Danzaki	9
2021–22	(Argentina) Juan Lescano	6
2022–23	(Republic of Ireland) Jay O'Shea	9
2023–24	(Australia) Henry Hore (Republic of Ireland) Jay O'Shea (Australia) Thomas Waddingham	7
2024–25	(Australia) Sam Klein	5
2025–26	(Australia) Sam Klein (Australia) Justin Vidic (England) Chris Long	4

=== Young Player of the Year ===
Year	Player
2012–13	(Australia) James Donachie
2015–16	(Australia) Jamie Maclaren
2016–17	(Australia) Joe Caletti
2017–18	(Australia) Connor O'Toole
2018–19	(Australia) Dylan Wenzel-Halls
2019–20	(Australia) Jordan Courtney-Perkins
2020–21	(Australia) Kai Trewin
2021–22	(Australia) Henry Hore
2022–23	(Australia) Kai Trewin
2023–24	(Australia) Thomas Waddingham
2024–25	(Australia) Lucas Herrington
2025–26	(Australia) Dimitri Valkanis

=== Queensland Roars Against Racism Multicultural Ambassador Award ===
Year	Player
2008–09	(Indonesia) Sergio van Dijk
2009–10	(Brazil) Reinaldo
2010–11	(Australia) Matt Smith

Discontinued after the 2010–11 season.

== Men’s Youth Team ==
=== Player of the Year ===
Year	Player
2008–09	(Australia) Chris Grossman
2009–10	(Australia) Matt Acton and Kenny Dougall
2010–11	(Australia) James Donachie
2011–12	(Australia) James Donachie
2012–13	(Australia) Ross Archibald
2013–14	(Australia) Brandon Borrello
2014–15	(Australia) Shelford Dais

== A-League Women ==
=== Player of the Year ===
Year	Player
2008–09	(Australia) Clare Polkinghorne
2009	(Australia) Elise Kellond-Knight
2010–11	(Australia) Elise Kellond-Knight
2011–12	(Australia) Tameka Butt
2012–13	(Australia) Katrina Gorry
2013–14	(Australia) Clare Polkinghorne
2014	(Australia) Kim Carroll
2015–16	(Australia) Angela Beard
2016–17	(Australia) Katrina Gorry
2017–18	(United States) Celeste Boureille
2018–19	(Australia) Clare Polkinghorne
2019–20	(United States) Carson Pickett
2020–21	(Australia) Isobel Dalton
2021–22	(Australia) Ayesha Norrie
2022–23	(United States) Shea Connors
2023–24	(Australia) Sharn Freier
2024–25	(Australia) Tameka Yallop
2025–26	(Japan) Momo Hayashi

=== Player's Player of the Year ===
Year	Player
2009	(Australia) Jo Burgess
2010–11	(Australia) Aivi Luik
2011–12	(Australia) Aivi Luik
2012–13	(Australia) Clare Polkinghorne
2013–14	(Australia) Kate Stewart (Australia) Vedrana Popovic
2014	(Australia) Clare Polkinghorne
2015–16	(Australia) Angela Beard
2016–17	(United States) Maddy Evans
2017–18	(Australia) Clare Polkinghorne
2018–19	(United States) Celeste Boureille
2019–20	(United States) Celeste Boureille
2020–21	(Australia) Clare Polkinghorne
2021–22	(Australia) Katrina Gorry
2022–23	(United States) Hensley Hancuff
2023–24	(Australia) Sharn Freier
2024–25	(Australia) Tameka Yallop
2025–26	(Netherlands) Bente Jansen

=== Golden Boot ===
Year	Player	Goals
2008–09	(Australia) Courtney Beutel	6
2009	(Australia) Tameka Butt	6
2010–11	(Australia) Tameka Butt	7
2011–12	(Australia) Emily Gielnik	9
2012–13	(Australia) Tameka Butt	8
2013–14	(Australia) Katrina Gorry	5
2014	(Australia) Tameka Butt	7
2015–16	(Australia) Emily Gielnik	2
2016–17	(Australia) Katrina Gorry (Australia) Tameka Butt	5
2017–18	(Australia) Allira Toby	5
2018–19	(Australia) Allira Toby	5
2019–20	(Australia) Hayley Raso	4
2020–21	(Australia) Emily Gielnik	13
2021–22	(Australia) Larissa Crummer	8
2022–23	(United States) Shea Connors	6
2023–24	(United States) Mia Corbin	8
2024–25	(Australia) Tameka Yallop	12
2025–26	(Netherlands) Bente Jansen	8

=== Young Player of the Year ===
Year	Player
2013–14	(Australia) Hayley Raso
2017–18	(Australia) Abbey Lloyd
2018–19	(Australia) Indiah-Paige Riley
2019–20	(Australia) Indiah-Paige Riley
2020–21	(Australia) Jamilla Rankin
2021–22	(Australia) Jamilla Rankin
2022–23	(Australia) Jamilla Rankin
2023–24	(Australia) Sharn Freier
2024–25	(Australia) Alicia Woods
2025–26	(Australia) Daisy Brown
