= 2010–11 Brisbane Roar FC (women) season =

Brisbane Roar (W-League)
2010–11 season
- Chairman: Chris Bombolas
- Head Coach: Jeff Hopkins
- Stadium: Ballymore Stadium; Perry Park
- W-League: 2nd
- W-League Finals: Winners
- Top goalscorer: League: Tameka Butt (5); All: Tameka Butt (7)
- Biggest win: 4–0 vs. Newcastle Jets (A) (20 November 2010); W-League
- Biggest defeat: 2–4 vs. Sydney FC (H) (6 November 2010); W-League
Home colours	Away colours

The 2010–11 season was Brisbane Roar Football Club (W-League)'s third season, in the W-League. Brisbane Roar finished 2nd in their W-League season, fishing as winners in the Grand Final.

== Players ==
Note: Flags indicate national team as defined under FIFA eligibility rules; some limited exceptions apply. Players may hold more than one non-FIFA nationality.

No.	Pos.	Nation	Player
1	GK	AUS	Casey Dumont
2	DF	AUS	Laura Brock
3	DF	AUS	Karla Reuter
4	DF	AUS	Clare Polkinghorne
5	DF	AUS	Brooke Spence
6	MF	AUS	Joanne Burgess
7	DF	AUS	Kim Carroll
8	MF	AUS	Elise Kellond-Knight
10	FW	AUS	Lana Harch

No.	Pos.	Nation	Player
11	MF	AUS	Aivi Luik
12	DF	NZL	Rebekah Stott
13	MF	AUS	Tameka Butt
15	DF	AUS	Erika Elze
16	MF	AUS	Lauren Colthorpe
17	FW	AUS	Emily Gielnik
18	FW	TRI	Kennya Cordner
19	MF	AUS	Lisa De Vanna
20	GK	AUS	Kate Stewart

== Competitions ==
=== Overall record ===
Competition	First match	Last match	Starting round	Final position	Record							
Competition	First match	Last match	Starting round	Final position	Pld	W	D	L	GF	GA	GD	Win %
W-League	6 November 2010	22 January 2011	Matchday 1	2nd	10	6	3	1	17	7	+10	60.00
W-League Finals	5 February 2011	12 February 2011	Semi-finals	Winners	2	1	1	0	4	3	+1	50.00
Total					12	7	4	1	21	10	+11	58.33

Source: Competitions

=== W-League ===
==== League table ====
Pos	Team	Pld	W	D	L	GF	GA	GD	Pts	Qualification
1	Sydney FC	10	8	0	2	29	9	+20	24	Qualification to Finals series
2	Brisbane Roar (C)	10	6	3	1	17	7	+10	21	Qualification to Finals series
3	Canberra United	10	5	2	3	16	9	+7	17	Qualification to Finals series
4	Melbourne Victory	10	4	3	3	12	11	+1	15	Qualification to Finals series
5	Perth Glory	10	4	1	5	11	15	−4	13	
6	Newcastle Jets	10	3	1	6	13	15	−2	10	
7	Adelaide United	10	0	0	10	4	36	−32	0	

Source: au.soccerway.com
Rules for classification: 1) points; 2) goal difference; 3) number of goals scored.
(C) Champions

==== Results summary ====
Overall								Home						Away					
Pld	W	D	L	GF	GA	GD	Pts	W	D	L	GF	GA	GD	W	D	L	GF	GA	GD
10	6	3	1	17	7	+10	21	2	2	1	4	4	0	4	1	0	13	3	+10

Source: worldfootball.net

==== Results by round ====
Round	1	2	3	4	5	6	7	8	9	10	11	12
Ground	H	A	A	H	A	A	H	A	B	H	H	B
Result	L	D	W	W	W	W	W	W	B	D	D	B
Position	5	5	3	2	1	1	1	1	1	1	2	2
Points	0	1	4	7	10	13	16	19	19	20	21	21

Source: worldfootball.net
A = Away; H = Home; W = Win; D = Draw; L = Loss

==== Matches ====
The league fixtures were announced on 20 August 2010.

Win Draw Loss

6 November 2010 1	Brisbane Roar	2–4	Sydney FC	Brisbane
14:00 AEST	Butt 14'; Harch 49'	Report	Garriock 5', 54'; Rollason 33'; Simon 36'	Stadium: Ballymore Stadium; Attendance: 1,093; Referee: Jacqui Melksham

13 November 2010 2	Canberra United	1–1	Brisbane Roar	Canberra
17:00 AEDT	Butt 45'	Report	Perry 81'	Stadium: McKellar Park; Attendance: 794; Referee: Peta McCallum

20 November 2010 3	Newcastle Jets	0–4	Brisbane Roar	Newcastle
15:00 AEDT		Report	Harch 2', 60'; Butt 25'; De Vanna 72' (pen.)	Stadium: Wanderers Oval; Referee: Kirralee Gardiner

27 November 2010 4	Brisbane Roar	1–0	Perth Glory	Brisbane
16:00 AEST	De Vanna 90+3'	Report		Stadium: Perry Park; Referee: Jacqui Melksman

4 December 2010 5	Melbourne Victory	1–4	Brisbane Roar	Melbourne
15:00 AEDT	Friend 65'	Report	Butt 23', 25'; De Vanna 71'; Gielnik 81'	Stadium: AAMI Park; Referee: Peta McCallum

10 December 2010 6	Adelaide United	1–3	Brisbane Roar	Adelaide
16:45 ACDT	Kuralay 28'	Report	Carroll 5'; Kellond-Knight 31'; Colthorpe 38'	Stadium: Hindmarsh Stadium; Referee: Catherine Hoffman

21 December 2010 7	Brisbane Roar	1–0	Canberra United	Brisbane
15:00 AEST	Harch 60'	Report		Stadium: Perry Park; Referee: Fusako Kajiyama
Note: Match originally scheduled for 18 December 2010 at 16:00 AEST, but postponed due to bad weather. It was rescheduled for 21 December 2010 at 15:00 AEST.

1 January 2011 8	Sydney FC	0–1	Brisbane Roar	Sydney
15:00 AEDT		Report	Burgess 49'	Stadium: Campbelltown Stadium; Referee: Kate Jacewicz

16 January 2011 10	Brisbane Roar	0–0	Melbourne Victory	Melbourne
16:00 AEDT		Report		Stadium: Epping Stadium; Referee: Catherine Hofmann
Note: Match originally located for Perry Park, but relocated due to poor weather conditions. It was relocated to Epping Stadium.

22 January 2011 11	Brisbane Roar	0–0	Newcastle Jets	Brisbane
14:00 AEST		Report		Stadium: Ballymore Stadium; Referee: Catherine Hoffman

==== Finals series ====
5 February 2011 Semi-finals	Brisbane Roar	2–2 (a.e.t.) (4–2 p)	Canberra United	Brisbane
14:00 AEST	Butt 23'; Cordner 90+6'	Report	Munoz 57'; Heyman 90+7'	Stadium: Ballymore Stadium; Referee: Jacqui Melksham
	Penalties
	Colthorpe (penalty missed); Carroll (penalty scored); Butt (penalty scored); Kellond-Knight (penalty scored); Dumont (penalty scored)		(penalty scored) Shipard; (penalty missed) Brush; (penalty scored) Cooper; (penalty missed) Perry

12 February 2011 Grand Final	Sydney FC	1–2	Brisbane Roar	Sydney
15:00 AEDT	Ledbrook 35'	Report	Butt 9'; De Vanna 64'	Stadium: Campbelltown Stadium; Attendance: 1,872; Referee: Kate Jacewicz

== Statistics ==
=== Appearances and goals ===
Includes all competitions. Players with no appearances not included in the list.

No.	Pos.	Nat.	Name	W-League				Total	
No.	Pos.	Nat.	Name	Regular season		Finals series		Total	
No.	Pos.	Nat.	Name	Apps	Goals	Apps	Goals	Apps	Goals
1	GK	(Australia)	Casey Dumont	10	0	2	0	12	0
2	DF	(Australia)	Laura Brock	6+2	0	0+1	0	9	0
3	DF	(Australia)	Karla Reuter	7	0	0+1	0	8	0
4	DF	(Australia)	Clare Polkinghorne	9	0	2	0	11	0
5	DF	(Australia)	Brooke Spence	10	0	2	0	12	0
6	MF	(Australia)	Joanne Burgess	8+2	1	2	0	12	1
7	DF	(Australia)	Kim Carroll	10	1	2	0	12	1
8	MF	(Australia)	Elise Kellond-Knight	9	1	2	0	11	1
10	FW	(Australia)	Lana Harch	9	4	2	0	11	4
11	MF	(Australia)	Aivi Luik	8	0	2	0	10	0
13	MF	(Australia)	Tameka Butt	10	5	2	2	12	7
16	MF	(Australia)	Lauren Colthorpe	6	1	2	0	8	1
17	FW	(Australia)	Emily Gielnik	0+7	1	0	0	7	1
18	FW	(Trinidad and Tobago)	Kennya Cordner	0+3	0	0+2	1	5	1
19	FW	(Australia)	Lisa De Vanna	2+6	3	0+2	1	10	4
—	FW	(Australia)	Amy Chapman	6+2	0	2	0	10	0

=== Disciplinary record ===
Includes all competitions. The list is sorted by squad number when total cards are equal. Players with no cards not included in the list.

Rank	No.	Pos.	Nat.	Name	W-League						Total		
Rank	No.	Pos.	Nat.	Name	Regular season			Finals series			Total		
Rank	No.	Pos.	Nat.	Name	Booked	(yellow card) (yellow-red card)	Sent off (straight red)	Booked	(yellow card) (yellow-red card)	Sent off (straight red)	Booked	(yellow card) (yellow-red card)	Sent off (straight red)
1	3	DF	(Australia)	Karla Reuter	0	0	1	0	0	0	0	0	1
2	4	DF	(Australia)	Clare Polkinghorne	1	0	0	1	0	0	2	0	0
2	8	MF	(Australia)	Elise Kellond-Knight	2	0	0	0	0	0	2	0	0
2	19	FW	(Australia)	Lisa De Vanna	2	0	0	0	0	0	2	0	0
5	5	DF	(Australia)	Brooke Spence	1	0	0	0	0	0	1	0	0
5	7	DF	(Australia)	Kim Carroll	1	0	0	0	0	0	1	0	0
5	16	MF	(Australia)	Lauren Colthorpe	1	0	0	0	0	0	1	0	0
5	—	FW	(Australia)	Amy Chapman	1	0	0	0	0	0	1	0	0
Total					6	0	1	4	0	0	10	0	1

=== Clean sheets ===
Includes all competitions. The list is sorted by squad number when total clean sheets are equal. Numbers in parentheses represent games where both goalkeepers participated and both kept a clean sheet; the number in parentheses is awarded to the goalkeeper who was substituted on, whilst a full clean sheet is awarded to the goalkeeper who was on the field at the start of play. Goalkeepers with no clean sheets not included in the list.

Rank	No.	Nat.	Goalkeeper	W-League		Total
Rank	No.	Nat.	Goalkeeper	Regular season	Finals series	Total
1	1	(Australia)	Casey Dumont	6	0	6
