= 2012–13 Brisbane Roar FC (women) season =

Brisbane Roar (W-League)
2012–13 season
- Chairman: Dali Tahir
- Head Coach: Belinda Wilson
- W-League: 1st
- W-League Finals: Semi-finals
- Top goalscorer: League: Tameka Butt (8); All: Tameka Butt (8)
- Biggest win: 6–2 vs. Adelaide United (H) (22 December 2012); W-League; 5–1 vs. Canberra United (H) (12 January 2013); W-League
- Biggest defeat: 1–3 vs. Sydney FC (H) (3 November 2012); W-League
Home colours	Away colours

The 2012–13 season was Brisbane Roar Football Club's fifth season, in the W-League. Brisbane Roar finished 1st in their W-League season, finishing in the semi-finals.

== Players ==
Note: Flags indicate national team as defined under FIFA eligibility rules; some limited exceptions apply. Players may hold more than one non-FIFA nationality.

No.	Pos.	Nation	Player
1	GK	JPN	Hoshimi Kishi
2	DF	AUS	Laura Brock
3	FW	AUS	Amy Chapman
4	DF	AUS	Clare Polkinghorne
5	DF	AUS	Brooke Spence
6	DF	AUS	Ashley Spina
7	DF	AUS	Erika Elze
8	MF	AUS	Elise Kellond-Knight
9	FW	AUS	Emma Pittman
10	FW	AUS	Lana Harch
11	DF	AUS	Vedrana Popovic
12	DF	AUS	Rebecca Price

No.	Pos.	Nation	Player
13	MF	AUS	Tameka Butt
14	MF	AUS	Georgia Chapman
15	FW	ENG	Hannah Beard
16	MF	JPN	Sachiko Tatsuoka
17	FW	AUS	Emily Gielnik
18	GK	AUS	Kate Stewart
19	MF	AUS	Katrina Gorry
20	GK	AUS	Joanne Buckley
22	FW	AUS	Lauren Brown
23	MF	AUS	Chelsea Harper
24	MF	AUS	Hayley Sheahan

== Transfers ==
=== Transfers in ===
No.	Position	Name	From	Type/fee	Date	Ref.
3	FW	Amy Chapman	(United States) Los Angeles Strikers	Free transfer	17 October 2012	
7	DF	Erika Elze	Perth Glory	Free transfer	17 October 2012	
9	FW	Emma Pittman	(Australia) The Gap	Free transfer	17 October 2012	
14	MF	Georgia Chapman	(Australia) Redlands United	Free transfer	17 October 2012	
15	FW	(England) Hannah Beard	(United States) Los Angeles Strikers	Free transfer	17 October 2012	
16	MF	(Japan) Sachiko Tatsuoka	(Australia) Redlands United	Free transfer	17 October 2012	
18	GK	Kate Stewart	Free agent	Free transfer	17 October 2012	
19	MF	Katrina Gorry	Melbourne Victory	Free transfer	17 October 2012	
20	GK	Joanne Buckley	(Australia) Redlands United	Free transfer	17 October 2012	

=== Transfers out ===
No.	Position	Name	To	Type/fee	Date	Ref.
22	MF	Michaela Hatzirodos	Newcastle Jets	Free transfer	2 October 2012	
9	FW	Catherine Cannuli	Western Sydney Wanderers	Free transfer	4 October 2012	
11	MF	Aivi Luik	Perth Glory	Free transfer	4 October 2012	
1	GK	Casey Dumont	Free agent	Free transfer	17 October 2012	
6	MF	Joanne Burgess	Free agent	Free transfer	19 October 2012	
7	MF	Kim Carroll	Free agent	Free transfer	19 October 2012	
18	FW	(Spain) Olga Cebrián García	Free agent	Free transfer	19 October 2012	
19	MF	Ellen Beaumont	Retired		19 October 2012	

== Competitions ==
=== Overall record ===
Competition	First match	Last match	Starting round	Final position	Record							
Competition	First match	Last match	Starting round	Final position	Pld	W	D	L	GF	GA	GD	Win %
W-League	20 October 2012	12 January 2013	Matchday 1	1st	12	8	2	2	28	15	+13	66.67
W-League Finals	19 January 2013		Semi-finals	Semi-finals	1	0	0	1	2	3	−1	0.00
Total					13	8	2	3	30	18	+12	61.54

Source: Competitions

=== W-League ===
==== League table ====
Pos	Team	Pld	W	D	L	GF	GA	GD	Pts	Qualification
1	Brisbane Roar	12	8	2	2	28	15	+13	26	Qualification to Finals series
2	Perth Glory	12	7	3	2	34	20	+14	24	Qualification to Finals series
3	Melbourne Victory	12	7	2	3	26	14	+12	23	Qualification to Finals series
4	Sydney FC (C)	12	6	2	4	30	24	+6	20	Qualification to Finals series
5	Canberra United	12	5	3	4	25	20	+5	18	
6	Western Sydney Wanderers	12	4	1	7	19	23	−4	13	
7	Newcastle Jets	12	1	3	8	15	33	−18	6	
8	Adelaide United	12	2	0	10	12	40	−28	6	

Source: au.soccerway.com
Rules for classification: 1) points; 2) goal difference; 3) number of goals scored.
(C) Champions

==== Results summary ====
Overall								Home						Away					
Pld	W	D	L	GF	GA	GD	Pts	W	D	L	GF	GA	GD	W	D	L	GF	GA	GD
12	8	2	2	28	15	+13	26	3	1	2	18	12	+6	5	1	0	10	3	+7

Source: worldfootball.net

==== Results by round ====
Round	1	2	3	4	5	6	7	8	9	10	11	12
Ground	A	A	H	A	H	H	A	H	A	H	A	H
Result	D	W	L	W	L	W	W	D	W	W	W	W
Position	5	4	4	4	6	5	3	4	2	2	1	1
Points	1	4	4	7	7	10	13	14	17	20	23	26

Source: worldfootball.net
A = Away; H = Home; W = Win; D = Draw; L = Loss

==== Matches ====
The league fixtures were announced on 18 September 2012.

Win Draw Loss

20 October 2012 1	Canberra United	0–0	Brisbane Roar	Canberra
14:00 AEDT		Report		Stadium: McKellar Park; Referee: Kate Jacewicz

27 October 2012 2	Melbourne Victory	0–1	Brisbane Roar	Melbourne
16:00 AEDT		Report	Popovic 18'	Stadium: Veneto Club; Referee: Rebecca Durcau

3 November 2012 3	Brisbane Roar	1–3	Sydney FC	Brisbane
15:00 AEST	Harch 42'	Report	Kerr 46'; Kete 57'; Perry 62'	Stadium: Cleveland Showgrounds; Referee: Kate Jacewicz

10 November 2012 4	Adelaide United	0–2	Brisbane Roar	Adelaide
14:00 ACDT		Report	Chapman 9'; Kellond-Knight 63'	Stadium: Hindmarsh Stadium; Referee: Rebecca Durcau

17 November 2012 5	Brisbane Roar	1–2	Western Sydney Wanderers	Brisbane
15:00 AEST	Chapman 49'	Report	Cannuli 7', 56'	Stadium: Cleveland Showgrounds; Referee: Katie Patterson

24 November 2012 6	Brisbane Roar	3–2	Melbourne Victory	Brisbane
10:00 AEST	Chapman 19', 86'; Spina 90+5'	Report	Spiranovic 72'; McDonald 90+2'	Stadium: Queensland Sport and Athletics Centre; Referee: Peta McCallum

2 December 2012 7	Newcastle Jets	2–3	Brisbane Roar	Newcastle
14:00 AEDT	Huster 16'; Simon 69'	Report	Chapman 54'; Gielnik 62' (pen.); Polkinghorne 80'	Stadium: Wanderers Oval; Referee: Katie Patterson

8 December 2012 8	Brisbane Roar	2–2	Perth Glory	Brisbane
10:00 AEST	Butt 61'; Gorry 87'	Report	Gill 34'; Tabain 44'	Stadium: Queensland Sport and Athletics Centre; Referee: Kirralee Gardner

16 December 2012 9	Western Sydney Wanderers	1–2	Brisbane Roar	Sydney
15:00 AEDT	Fors 68'	Report	Butt 21'; Gielnik 27'	Stadium: Campbelltown Stadium; Referee: Catherine Hoffman

22 December 2012 10	Brisbane Roar	6–2	Adelaide United	Brisbane
15:00 AEST	Chapman 20'; Gielnik 23', 35', 90+3'; Popovic 58'	Report	Moore 65'; Quigley 77'	Stadium: A.J. Kelly Park; Referee: Peta McCallum

5 January 2013 11	Sydney FC	0–2	Brisbane Roar	Sydney
15:00 AEDT		Report	Butt 45+3', 55'	Stadium: Cromer Park; Referee: Katie Patterson

12 January 2013 12	Brisbane Roar	5–1	Canberra United	Brisbane
10:30 AEST	Gorry 11'; Butt 38', 41' (pen.), 70'; Gielnik 65'	Report	Mewis 45+4'	Stadium: Queensland Sport and Athletics Centre; Referee: Katie Patterson

==== Finals series ====
19 January 2013 Semi-finals	Brisbane Roar	2–3	Sydney FC	Brisbane
15:00 AEST	Gielnik 14'; Popovic 75'	Report	Longo 19'; Kerr 29', 61'	Stadium: Queensland Sport and Athletics Centre; Attendance: 1,901; Referee: Peta McCallum

== Statistics ==
=== Appearances and goals ===
Includes all competitions. Players with no appearances not included in the list.

No.	Pos.	Nat.	Name	W-League				Total	
No.	Pos.	Nat.	Name	Regular season		Finals series		Total	
No.	Pos.	Nat.	Name	Apps	Goals	Apps	Goals	Apps	Goals
1	GK	(Japan)	Hoshimi Kishi	6+1	0	0+1	0	8	0
2	DF	(Australia)	Laura Brock	9	0	1	0	10	0
3	FW	(Australia)	Amy Chapman	12	6	0	0	12	6
4	DF	(Australia)	Clare Polkinghorne	10	1	1	0	11	1
5	DF	(Australia)	Brooke Spence	10	0	1	0	11	0
6	DF	(Australia)	Ashley Spina	2+9	1	0+1	0	12	1
7	DF	(Australia)	Erika Elze	12	0	1	0	13	0
8	MF	(Australia)	Elise Kellond-Knight	9	1	1	0	10	1
9	FW	(Australia)	Emma Pittman	2+2	0	0	0	4	0
10	FW	(Australia)	Lana Harch	8+2	1	0	0	10	1
11	DF	(Australia)	Vedrana Popovic	12	2	1	0	13	2
13	MF	(Australia)	Tameka Butt	5+4	8	1	0	10	8
14	MF	(Australia)	Georgia Chapman	0+4	0	0	0	4	0
15	FW	(England)	Hannah Beard	4+4	0	0+1	0	9	0
16	MF	(Japan)	Sachiko Tatsuoka	5+4	0	1	0	10	0
17	FW	(Australia)	Emily Gielnik	8+1	0	1	0	10	0
18	GK	(Australia)	Kate Stewart	6	0	1	0	7	0
19	MF	(Australia)	Katrina Gorry	10	2	1	0	11	2
22	FW	(Australia)	Lauren Brown	0+2	0	0	0	2	0
23	MF	(Australia)	Chelsea Harper	2	0	0	0	2	0
24	MF	(Australia)	Hayley Sheahan	0+1	0	0	0	1	0

=== Disciplinary record ===
Includes all competitions. The list is sorted by squad number when total cards are equal. Players with no cards not included in the list.

Rank	No.	Pos.	Nat.	Name	W-League						Total		
Rank	No.	Pos.	Nat.	Name	Regular season			Finals series			Total		
Rank	No.	Pos.	Nat.	Name	Booked	(yellow card) (yellow-red card)	Sent off (straight red)	Booked	(yellow card) (yellow-red card)	Sent off (straight red)	Booked	(yellow card) (yellow-red card)	Sent off (straight red)
1	5	DF	(Australia)	Brooke Spence	2	0	0	0	0	0	2	0	0
1	11	DF	(Australia)	Vedrana Popovic	1	0	0	1	0	0	2	0	0
1	19	MF	(Australia)	Katrina Gorry	1	0	0	1	0	0	2	0	0
4	3	FW	(Australia)	Amy Chapman	1	0	0	0	0	0	1	0	0
4	4	DF	(Australia)	Clare Polkinghorne	0	0	0	1	0	0	1	0	0
4	7	DF	(Australia)	Erika Elze	1	0	0	0	0	0	1	0	0
4	13	MF	(Australia)	Tameka Butt	1	0	0	0	0	0	1	0	0
Total					7	0	0	3	0	0	10	0	0

=== Clean sheets ===
Includes all competitions. The list is sorted by squad number when total clean sheets are equal. Numbers in parentheses represent games where both goalkeepers participated and both kept a clean sheet; the number in parentheses is awarded to the goalkeeper who was substituted on, whilst a full clean sheet is awarded to the goalkeeper who was on the field at the start of play. Goalkeepers with no clean sheets not included in the list.

Rank	No.	Nat.	Goalkeeper	W-League		Total
Rank	No.	Nat.	Goalkeeper	Regular season	Finals series	Total
1	1	(Japan)	Hoshimi Kishi	2 (1)	0	2 (1)
2	18	(Australia)	Kate Stewart	2	0	2
Total				4 (1)	0	4 (1)
