= 2011–12 Brisbane Roar FC (women) season =

Brisbane Roar (W-League)
2011–12 season
- Chairman: Eugenie Buckley; Michael Bowers (caretaker)
- Head Coach: Jeff Hopkins
- W-League: 2nd
- W-League Finals: Runners-up
- Top goalscorer: League: Emily Gielnik (7); All: Emily Gielnik (9)
- Biggest win: 5–2 vs. Perth Glory (A) (19 November 2011); W-League
- Biggest defeat: 2–3 vs. Newcastle Jets (H) (5 November 2011); W-League; 2–3 vs. Canberra United (A) (28 January 2012); W-League Grand Final
Home colours	Away colours

The 2011–12 season was Brisbane Roar Football Club (W-League)'s fourth season, in the W-League. Brisbane Roar finished 2nd in their W-League season, fishing as runners-up in the Grand Final. They looked to successfully defend their silverware, having won the Grand Final the season before.

On 2 August 2011, the club confirmed they would be supplied with kits and training gear by German multinational apparel company Puma, to which the women's team will wear also. It is the first time in the history of the club and W-League that they will not be wearing a kit that is made by Hummel. On 4 October 2011, 3 weeks out from the start of the 2011–12 A-League season, The World Game reported that the Bakrie Group had struck a 10-year deal to take 70% ownership of the club, with the other 30% being occupied by the FFA.

== Players ==
Correct as of 12 December 2011

Note: Flags indicate national team as defined under FIFA eligibility rules; some limited exceptions apply. Players may hold more than one non-FIFA nationality.

No.	Pos.	Nation	Player
1	GK	AUS	Casey Dumont
2	DF	AUS	Laura Alleway
3	DF	AUS	Karla Reuter
4	DF	AUS	Clare Polkinghorne (Captain)
5	DF	AUS	Brooke Spence
6	MF	AUS	Joanne Burgess
7	MF	AUS	Kim Carroll
8	MF	AUS	Elise Kellond-Knight
9	FW	AUS	Catherine Cannuli
10	FW	AUS	Lana Harch
11	MF	AUS	Aivi Luik
12	MF	AUS	Ashley Spina

No.	Pos.	Nation	Player
13	MF	AUS	Tameka Butt
14	DF	AUS	Vedrana Popovic
15	FW	AUS	Sasha McDonnell
16	MF	AUS	Lauren Colthorpe
17	FW	AUS	Emily Gielnik
18	FW	ESP	Olga Cebrian Garcia
19	MF	AUS	Ellen Beaumont
20	GK	JPN	Hoshimi Kishi
21	DF	AUS	Rebecca Price
22	MF	AUS	Michaela Hatzirodos
30	GK	AUS	Monique Nelson

== Transfers ==
=== Transfers in ===
Date	Name
17 October 2011	(Australia) Catherine Cannuli
17 October 2011	(Australia) Ashley Spina
17 October 2011	(Australia) Vedrana Popovic
17 October 2011	(Australia) Sasha McDonnell
17 October 2011	(Australia) Ellen Beaumont
17 October 2011	(Japan) Hoshimi Kishi

=== Transfers out ===
Date	Name
17 October 2011	(Australia) Alisha Foote
17 October 2011	(Australia) Rebekah Stott
17 October 2011	(Australia) Amy Chapman
17 October 2011	(Australia) Erika Elze
17 October 2011	(Australia) Lauren Colthorpe
17 October 2011	(Australia) Lisa De Vanna

== Competitions ==
=== Overall record ===
Competition	First match	Last match	Starting round	Final position	Record							
Competition	First match	Last match	Starting round	Final position	Pld	W	D	L	GF	GA	GD	Win %
W-League	22 October 2011	14 January 2012	Matchday 1	2nd	10	6	3	1	20	11	+9	60.00
W-League Finals	22 January 2012	28 January 2012	Semi-finals	Runners-up	2	0	1	1	3	4	−1	0.00
Total					12	6	4	2	23	15	+8	50.00

Source: Competitions

=== W-League ===
==== League table ====
Pos	Team	Pld	W	D	L	GF	GA	GD	Pts	Qualification
1	Canberra United (C)	10	7	3	0	23	9	+14	24	Qualification to Finals series
2	Brisbane Roar	10	6	3	1	20	11	+9	21	Qualification to Finals series
3	Sydney FC	10	5	2	3	26	8	+18	17	Qualification to Finals series
4	Melbourne Victory	10	5	2	3	21	9	+12	17	Qualification to Finals series
5	Newcastle Jets	10	4	0	6	18	22	−4	12	
6	Perth Glory	10	2	0	8	11	36	−25	6	
7	Adelaide United	10	1	0	9	6	30	−24	3	

Source: au.soccerway.com
Rules for classification: 1) points; 2) goal difference; 3) number of goals scored.
(C) Champions

==== Results summary ====
Overall								Home						Away					
Pld	W	D	L	GF	GA	GD	Pts	W	D	L	GF	GA	GD	W	D	L	GF	GA	GD
10	6	3	1	20	11	+9	21	3	1	1	8	5	+3	3	2	0	12	6	+6

Source: worldfootball.net

==== Results by round ====
Round	1	2	3	4	5	6	7	8	9	10	11	12
Ground	A	B	H	A	A	H	H	H	A	B	A	H
Result	D	B	L	W	W	W	D	W	D	B	W	W
Position	3	5	6	4	2	3	3	3	2	2	2	2
Points	1	1	1	4	7	10	11	14	15	15	18	21

Source: worldfootball.net
A = Away; H = Home; W = Win; D = Draw; L = Loss

==== Matches ====
Win Draw Loss

22 October 2011 1	Sydney FC	1–1	Brisbane Roar	Sydney
15:00 AEDT	Rollason 26'	Report	Burgess 51'	Stadium: Leichhardt Oval; Referee: Peta McCallum

5 November 2011 3	Brisbane Roar	2–3	Newcastle Jets	Brisbane
16:00 AEST	Alleway 18'; Gielnik 55'	Report	Andrews 24'; De Vanna 72', 83'	Stadium: Cleveland Showgrounds; Referee: Kate Jacewicz

12 November 2011 4	Adelaide United	1–2	Brisbane Roar	Adelaide
16:00 ACDT	Rajcic 76'	Report	Polkinghorne 38'; Spina 63'	Stadium: Burton Park; Referee: Catherine Hoffman

19 November 2011 5	Perth Glory	2–5	Brisbane Roar	Perth
16:00 AWST	Kete 25' (pen.); Tabain 78'	Report	Butt 6', 44', 74' (pen.); Gielnik 60'; Polkinghorne 72'	Stadium: 6PR Stadium; Referee: Trent Fleskens

26 November 2011 6	Brisbane Roar	1–0	Melbourne Victory	Brisbane
15:00 AEST	Gielnik 47'	Report		Stadium: Cleveland Showgrounds; Referee: Rebecca Durcau

3 December 2011 7	Brisbane Roar	2–2	Canberra United	Brisbane
15:00 AEST	Burgess 7'; Brush 88' (o.g.)	Report	Shipard 9'; Heyman 78'	Stadium: Cleveland Showgrounds; Referee: Kate Jacewicz

10 December 2011 8	Brisbane Roar	2–0	Adelaide United	Sunshine Coast
14:00 AEST	Luik 6'; Gielnik 90'	Report		Stadium: Sunshine Coast Stadium; Referee: Rebecca Durcau

17 December 2011 9	Melbourne Victory	1–1	Brisbane Roar	Geelong
15:00 AEDT	Fletcher 78'	Report	Gielnik 90+1'	Stadium: Skilled Stadium; Referee: Kate Jacewicz

7 January 2012 11	Newcastle Jets	1–3	Brisbane Roar	Newcastle
15:00 AEDT	O'Neill 53'	Report	Harch 29'; Gielnik 69', 90'	Stadium: Adamstown Oval; Attendance: 822; Referee: Katie Patterson

14 January 2012 12	Brisbane Roar	1–0	Sydney FC	Brisbane
14:00 AEST	Polias 32' (o.g.)	Report		Stadium: Queensland Sport and Athletics Centre; Referee: Kirralee Andruschak

==== Finals series ====
22 January 2012 Semi-finals	Brisbane Roar	1–1 (a.e.t.) (4–3 p)	Sydney FC	Brisbane
14:00 AEST	Gielnik 90+5'	Report	Rollason 18'	Stadium: Queensland Sport and Athletics Centre; Attendance: 1,648; Referee: Casey Reibelt
	Penalties
	Caroll (penalty scored); Butt (penalty scored); Spence (penalty scored); Garcia (penalty missed); Luik (penalty scored)		(penalty scored) Slatyer; (penalty missed) Johnson; (penalty scored) Brogan; (penalty missed) Polias; (penalty scored) Allen

28 January 2012 Grand Final	Canberra United	3–2	Brisbane Roar	Canberra
15:00 AEDT	Heyman 11', 56'; Sykes 18'	Report	Gielnik 22'; Butt 63' (pen.)	Stadium: McKellar Park; Attendance: 2,512; Referee: Kate Jacewicz

== Statistics ==
=== Disciplinary record ===
Correct as of Grand Final

#	Nat.	Pos.	Name	League		Total	
#	Nat.	Pos.	Name	Booked	Sent off (straight red)	Booked	Sent off (straight red)
17	(Australia)	MF	Ellen Beaumont	2	–	2	-
9	(Australia)	FW	Catherine Cannuli	2	–	2	-
1	(Australia)	GK	Casey Dumont	–	1	-	1
2	(Australia)	DF	Laura Alleway	1	–	1	-
5	(Australia)	DF	Brooke Spence	1	–	1	-
7	(Australia)	MF	Kim Carroll	1	–	1	-
14	(Australia)	MF	Vedrana Popovic	1	–	1	-
17	(Australia)	FW	Emily Gielnik	1	–	1	-
			TOTALS	9	1	9	1

=== Goalscorers by round ===
Total	Player		Goals per Round											
Total	Player		1	2	3	4	5	6	7	8	9	10	SF	GF
9	(Australia)	Emily Gielnik		1		1	1	1	1	2			1	1
4	(Australia)	Tameka Butt				3								1
2	(Australia)	Clare Polkinghorne			1	1								
2	(Australia)	Joanne Burgess	1					1						
1	(Australia)	Laura Alleway		1										
1	(Australia)	Ashley Spina			1									
1	(Australia)	Aivi Luik							1					
1	(Australia)	Lana Harch									1			
2	Goal	Own goal						1				1		
23	TOTAL		1	2	2	5	1	2	2	1	3	1	1	2

A goal was scored from a penalty kick Two goals were scored from penalty kicks

== See also ==
- Brisbane Roar FC
- 2011–12 W-League
- Brisbane Roar FC records and statistics
- Brisbane Roar end of season awards
