= 2013–14 Brisbane Roar FC (women) season =

Brisbane Roar WFC
2013–14 season
- Chairman: Dali Tahir
- Manager: Belinda Wilson
- Stadium: A.J. Kelly Park / Perry Park / QSAC
- W-League: 4th
- W-League Finals series: Runners-up
- Top goalscorer: League: Katrina Gorry (5); All: Katrina Gorry (5)
| Home colours | Away colours |

The 2013–14 Brisbane Roar FC W-League season was the club's sixth participation in the W-League, since the league's formation in 2008.

== Players ==
=== Squad information ===
Note: Flags indicate national team as defined under FIFA eligibility rules; some limited exceptions apply. Players may hold more than one non-FIFA nationality.

| No. | Pos. | Nation | Player |
|---|---|---|---|
| 1 | GK | GER | Nadine Angerer |
| 2 | DF | AUS | Laura Alleway |
| 3 | DF | AUS | Amy Chapman |
| 4 | DF | AUS | Clare Polkinghorne (Captain) |
| 5 | DF | AUS | Brooke Spence |
| 6 | FW | AUS | Joanne Burgess |
| 7 | DF | AUS | Kim Carroll |
| 8 | MF | AUS | Elise Kellond-Knight (Vice-Captain) |
| 9 | FW | AUS | Larissa Crummer |
| 10 | MF | AUS | Katrina Gorry |
| 11 | MF | AUS | Vedrana Popovic |

| No. | Pos. | Nation | Player |
|---|---|---|---|
| 12 | MF | AUS | Erika Elze |
| 13 | MF | AUS | Tameka Butt |
| 14 | DF | AUS | Natasha Wheeler |
| 15 | DF | AUS | Brooke Goodrich |
| 16 | FW | AUS | Hayley Raso |
| 17 | FW | AUS | Emily Gielnik |
| 18 | MF | AUS | Sunny Franco |
| 19 | MF | AUS | Ayesha Norrie |
| 20 | GK | AUS | Kate Stewart |
| 21 | GK | AUS | Teagan Micah |

== Transfers ==
=== In ===
| Date | Pos. | Name | From | Contract | Fee |
|---|---|---|---|---|---|
| 12 July 2013 | GK | (Germany) Nadine Angerer | (Germany) FFC Frankfurt | 2013/14 | Free |
| 24 September 2013 | FW | (Australia) Larissa Crummer | (Australia) Sydney FC | 2013/14 | Free |
| 24 September 2013 | FW | (Australia) Hayley Raso | (Australia) Canberra United | 2013/14 | Free |
| 7 November 2013 | DF | (Australia) Natasha Wheeler | (Australia) QAS | 2013/14 | Free |
| 7 November 2013 | DF | (Australia) Brooke Goodrich | (Australia) QAS | 2013/14 | Free |
| 7 November 2013 | MF | (Australia) Sunny Franco | (Australia) QAS | 2013/14 | Free |
| 7 November 2013 | MF | (Australia) Ayesha Norrie | (Australia) QAS | 2013/14 | Free |
| 10 January 2014 | GK | (Australia) Teagan Micah | | Replacement player | Free |

=== Out ===
| Date | Pos. | Name | To | Contract | Fee |
|---|---|---|---|---|---|
| 12 September 2013 | GK | (Australia) Casey Dumont | (Australia) Sydney FC | 2013/14 | Free |
| 2 November 2013 | FW | (Australia) Lana Harch | Retired | N/A | N/A |
| 3 November 2013 | FW | (England) Hannah Beard | (Australia) Newcastle Jets | 2013/14 | Free |
| 3 November 2013 | FW | (Australia) Lauren Brown | (Australia) Newcastle Jets | 2013/14 | Free |
| 3 November 2013 | MF | (Australia) Ashley Spina | (Australia) Newcastle Jets | 2013/14 | Free |
| 7 November 2013 | FW | (Australia) Emma Pittman | (Australia) The Gap Gators | 2013/14 | Free |
| 7 November 2013 | GK | (Australia) Joanne Buckley | (Australia) Redlands United | 2013/14 | Free |
| 7 November 2013 | MF | (Japan) Sachiko Tatsuoka | (Australia) Redlands United | 2013/14 | Free |
| 7 November 2013 | GK | (Japan) Hoshimi Kishi | Free agent | N/A | Free |
| 7 November 2013 | DF | (Australia) Georgia Chapman | Free agent | N/A | Free |

== Pre-season and friendlies ==
| 21 September 2013 | Brisbane Roar (Australia) | 4–0 | Australia Women U-17 | Toowoomba |
| Saturday 13:00 AEST | Alleway 9'; Chapman 37'; T. Butt 75'; Gielnik 77' | | | Stadium: Clive Berghofer Stadium |

| 29 September 2013 | Olympic FC U-16 (Australia) | 4–0 | (Australia) Brisbane Roar | Yeronga |
| Sunday 17:15 AEST | Poljak 14', 21', 63'; 54' (o.g.) | | | Stadium: Goodwin Park |

== Competitions ==
=== Overall record ===
| Competition | First match | Last match | Starting round | Final position | Record | | | | | | | |
| Competition | First match | Last match | Starting round | Final position | Pld | W | D | L | GF | GA | GD | Win % |
|---|---|---|---|---|---|---|---|---|---|---|---|---|
| W-League | 9 November 2013 | 9 February 2014 | Matchday 1 | 4th | 12 | 7 | 2 | 3 | 22 | 16 | +6 | 58.33 |
| W-League Finals | 15 February 2014 | 23 February 2014 | Semi-finals | Runners-up | 2 | 1 | 0 | 1 | 2 | 3 | −1 | 50.00 |
| Total | | | | | 14 | 8 | 2 | 4 | 24 | 19 | +5 | 57.14 |

Source: Competitions

=== W-League ===
==== League table ====
| Pos | Team | Pld | W | D | L | GF | GA | GD | Pts | Qualification |
|---|---|---|---|---|---|---|---|---|---|---|
| 1 | Canberra United | 12 | 9 | 0 | 3 | 28 | 8 | +20 | 27 | Qualification to Finals series |
| 2 | Sydney FC | 12 | 8 | 2 | 2 | 37 | 14 | +23 | 26 | Qualification to Finals series |
| 3 | Melbourne Victory (C) | 12 | 7 | 2 | 3 | 23 | 12 | +11 | 23 | Qualification to Finals series |
| 4 | Brisbane Roar | 12 | 7 | 2 | 3 | 22 | 16 | +6 | 23 | Qualification to Finals series |
| 5 | Perth Glory | 12 | 5 | 0 | 7 | 17 | 31 | −14 | 15 | |
| 6 | Adelaide United | 12 | 3 | 4 | 5 | 12 | 15 | −3 | 13 | |
| 7 | Western Sydney Wanderers | 12 | 2 | 3 | 7 | 17 | 23 | −6 | 9 | |
| 8 | Newcastle Jets | 12 | 0 | 1 | 11 | 10 | 47 | −37 | 1 | |

Source: au.soccerway.com
Rules for classification: 1) points; 2) goal difference; 3) number of goals scored.
(C) Champions

==== Results summary ====
| Overall | | | | | | | | Home | | | | | | Away | | | | | |
| Pld | W | D | L | GF | GA | GD | Pts | W | D | L | GF | GA | GD | W | D | L | GF | GA | GD |
|---|---|---|---|---|---|---|---|---|---|---|---|---|---|---|---|---|---|---|---|
| 12 | 7 | 2 | 3 | 22 | 16 | +6 | 23 | 3 | 1 | 2 | 7 | 8 | −1 | 4 | 1 | 1 | 15 | 8 | +7 |

Last updated: 10 February 2014.
Source: Competitive Matches

==== Results by round ====
| Round | 1 | 2 | 3 | 4 | 5 | 6 | 7 | 8 | 9 | 10 | 11 | 12 |
|---|---|---|---|---|---|---|---|---|---|---|---|---|
| Ground | H | A | A | A | H | H | A | H | A | H | A | H |
| Result | L | W | W | W | L | D | W | W | L | W | D | W |
| Position | 7 | 4 | 3 | 4 | 4 | 4 | 4 | 3 | 4 | 4 | 4 | 4 |
| Points | 0 | 3 | 6 | 9 | 9 | 10 | 13 | 16 | 16 | 19 | 20 | 23 |

Source: worldfootball.net
A = Away; H = Home; W = Win; D = Draw; L = Loss

==== Matches ====
| 9 November 2013 1 | Brisbane Roar | 0–3 | Canberra United | Brisbane |
| 15:00 AEST | | Report | Lindsey 8'; Heyman 38', 49' | Stadium: A.J. Kelly Park; Referee: Casey Reibelt |

| 16 November 2013 2 | Perth Glory | 0–3 | Brisbane Roar | Perth |
| 18:00 AWST | | Report | Butt 3'; Polkinghorne 63'; Chapman 83' | Stadium: Percy Doyle Reserve; Referee: Kirralee Andruschak |
Note: Match originally set to be played at Initga Stadium, but was moved due to unsuitable pitch conditions. It was moved to Percy Doyle Reserve.

| 1 December 2013 3 | Western Sydney Wanderers | 1–4 | Brisbane Roar | Sydney |
| 15:00 AEDT | Cannuli 43' | Report | Gorry 49', 81', 90'; Raso 51' | Stadium: Marconi Stadium; Referee: Kate Jacewicz |

| 8 December 2013 4 | Canberra United | 0–1 | Brisbane Roar | Canberra |
| 15:00 AEDT | | Report | Kellond-Knight 8' | Stadium: McKellar Park; Attendance: 803; Referee: Kirralee Andruschak |

| 15 December 2013 5 | Brisbane Roar | 0–1 | Adelaide United | Brisbane |
| 14:00 AEST | | Report | Di Bartolo 73' | Stadium: Queensland Sport and Athletics Centre; Referee: Kate Jacewicz |

| 22 December 2013 6 | Brisbane Roar | 1–1 | Sydney FC | Brisbane |
| 15:00 AEDT | Raso 56' | Report | Rollason 5' | Stadium: Goodwin Park; Referee: Kirralee Andruschak |

| 4 January 2014 7 | Newcastle Jets | 2–6 | Brisbane Roar | Newcastle |
| 14:00 AEDT | Andrews 74' (pen.); Dobson 76' | Report | Popovic 17'; Gielnik 19', 32'; Butt 51'; Polkinghorne 62' (pen.); Raso 90' | Stadium: Wanderers Oval; Referee: Kelly Jones |

| 12 January 2014 8 | Brisbane Roar | 2–1 | Perth Glory | Brisbane |
| 15:00 AEST | Butt 67'; Gorry 75' | Report | Sutton 78' | Stadium: A.J. Kelly Park; Referee: Casey Reibelt |

| 19 January 2014 9 | Sydney FC | 4–0 | Brisbane Roar | Sydney |
| 15:00 AEDT | Kete 18'; Khamis 20'; Taylor 44', 79' | Report | | Stadium: Sydney United Sports Centre; Referee: Kate Jacewicz |

| 24 January 2014 10 | Brisbane Roar | 3–2 | Western Sydney Wanderers | Brisbane |
| 16:00 AEST | Crummer 19'; Raso 31'; Butt 82' | Report | Gordon 8'; Carney 45+2' | Stadium: Suncorp Stadium |

| 1 February 2014 11 | Adelaide United | 1–1 | Brisbane Roar | Adelaide |
| 19:30 ACDT | Condon 87' | Report | Gielnik 64' | Stadium: Adelaide Shores Football Centre; Referee: Kirralee Andruschak |
Note: Match originally scheduled for 14:00 ACDT, but delayed due to scheduling of matches ahead of the W-League Finals. It was rescheduled for 19:30 ACDT.

| 9 February 2014 12 | Brisbane Roar | 1–0 | Melbourne Victory | Brisbane |
| 14:00 AEST | Gorry 40' | Report | | Stadium: Queensland Sport and Athletics Centre; Referee: Rebecca Durcau |

==== Finals series ====
| 15 February 2014 Semi-finals | Canberra United | 1–2 | Brisbane Roar | Canberra |
| 15:00 AEDT | Munoz 23' | Report | Carroll 4'; Kellond-Knight 58' | Stadium: McKellar Park; Attendance: 1,148; Referee: Kirralee Andruschak |

| 23 February 2014 Grand final | Melbourne Victory | 2–0 | Brisbane Roar | Melbourne |
| 15:00 AEDT | De Vanna 38'; Barnes 41' | Report | | Stadium: Lakeside Stadium; Attendance: 2,504; Referee: Casey Reibelt |

== Statistics ==
=== Appearances and goals ===
Includes all competitions. Players with no appearances not included in the list.

| No. | Pos | Nat | Player | Total | | W-League | | W-League Finals | |
| No. | Pos | Nat | Player | Apps | Goals | Apps | Goals | Apps | Goals |
|---|---|---|---|---|---|---|---|---|---|
| 1 | GK | (Germany) GER | Nadine Angerer | 9 | 0 | 7 | 0 | 2 | 0 |
| 20 | GK | (Australia) AUS | Kate Stewart | 6 | 0 | 5+1 | 0 | 0 | 0 |
| 2 | DF | (Australia) AUS | Laura Alleway | 13 | 0 | 11 | 0 | 2 | 0 |
| 4 | DF | (Australia) AUS | Clare Polkinghorne | 9 | 2 | 9 | 2 | 0 | 0 |
| 5 | DF | (Australia) AUS | Brooke Spence | 14 | 0 | 11+1 | 0 | 2 | 0 |
| 7 | DF | (Australia) AUS | Kim Carroll | 14 | 1 | 12 | 0 | 2 | 1 |
| 8 | DF | (Australia) AUS | Elise Kellond-Knight | 14 | 2 | 12 | 1 | 2 | 1 |
| 11 | DF | (Australia) AUS | Vedrana Popovic | 14 | 1 | 12 | 1 | 2 | 0 |
| 12 | DF | (Australia) AUS | Erika Elze | 1 | 0 | 1 | 0 | 0 | 0 |
| 14 | DF | (Australia) AUS | Natasha Wheeler | 5 | 0 | 2+3 | 0 | 0 | 0 |
| 10 | MF | (Australia) AUS | Katrina Gorry | 14 | 5 | 12 | 5 | 2 | 0 |
| 13 | MF | (Australia) AUS | Tameka Butt | 11 | 4 | 9 | 4 | 2 | 0 |
| 19 | MF | (Australia) AUS | Ayesha Norrie | 8 | 0 | 1+5 | 0 | 2 | 0 |
| 3 | FW | (Australia) AUS | Amy Chapman | 6 | 1 | 6 | 1 | 0 | 0 |
| 6 | FW | (Australia) AUS | Joanne Burgess | 12 | 0 | 3+7 | 0 | 0+2 | 0 |
| 9 | FW | (Australia) AUS | Larissa Crummer | 14 | 1 | 7+5 | 1 | 0+2 | 0 |
| 16 | FW | (Australia) AUS | Hayley Raso | 14 | 4 | 10+2 | 4 | 2 | 0 |
| 17 | FW | (Australia) AUS | Emily Gielnik | 9 | 3 | 2+5 | 3 | 2 | 0 |
| 18 | FW | (Australia) AUS | Sunny Franco | 6 | 0 | 0+4 | 0 | 0+2 | 0 |

=== Disciplinary record ===
Correct as of 10 February 2014

| # | Nat. | Pos. | Name | League | | Finals | | Total | |
| # | Nat. | Pos. | Name | Booked | Sent off (straight red) | Booked | Sent off (straight red) | Booked | Sent off (straight red) |
| 2 | (Australia) | DF | Laura Alleway | – | 1 | – | – | - | 1 |
| 16 | (Australia) | FW | Hayley Raso | 2 | – | – | – | 2 | - |
| 11 | (Australia) | DF | Vedrana Popovic | 1 | – | – | – | 1 | - |
| 4 | (Australia) | DF | Clare Polkinghorne | 1 | – | – | – | 1 | - |
| 10 | (Australia) | MF | Katrina Gorry | 1 | – | – | – | 1 | - |
| 5 | (Australia) | DF | Brooke Spence | 1 | – | – | – | 1 | - |
| | | | Totals | 6 | 1 | – | – | 6 | 1 |

=== League goalscorers per round ===
| Total | Player | | Goals per round | | | | | | | | | | | |
| Total | Player | | 1 | 2 | 3 | 4 | 5 | 6 | 7 | 8 | 9 | 10 | 11 | 12 |
|---|---|---|---|---|---|---|---|---|---|---|---|---|---|---|
| 5 | (Australia) | Katrina Gorry | | | 3 | | | | | 1 | | | | 1 |
| 4 | (Australia) | Hayley Raso | | | 1 | | | 1 | 1 | | | 1 | | |
| 4 | (Australia) | Tameka Butt | | 1 | | | | | 1 | 1 | | 1 | | |
| 3 | (Australia) | Emily Gielnik | | | | | | | 2 | | | | 1 | |
| 2 | (Australia) | Clare Polkinghorne | | 1 | | | | | 1 | | | | | |
| 1 | (Australia) | Amy Chapman | | 1 | | | | | | | | | | |
| 1 | (Australia) | Elise Kellond-Knight | | | | 1 | | | | | | | | |
| 1 | (Australia) | Vedrana Popovic | | | | | | | 1 | | | | | |
| 1 | (Australia) | Larissa Crummer | | | | | | | | | | 1 | | |
| 22 | Total | | 0 | 3 | 4 | 1 | 0 | 1 | 6 | 2 | 0 | 3 | 1 | 1 |

== Awards ==
- Player of the Week (Round 4) – Katrina Gorry
- 2013 FIFA World Player of the Year – Nadine Angerer
- Player of the Week (Round 12) – Elise Kellond-Knight
