= 2009 Brisbane Roar FC (women) season =

Coordinates: 27°26′31″S 153°1′4″E

Brisbane Roar (W-League)
2009 season
- Chairman: John Ribot
- Head Coach: Jeff Hopkins
- Stadium: Ballymore Stadium
- W-League: 3rd
- W-League Finals: Runners-up
- Top goalscorer: League: Tameka Butt (5); All: Tameka Butt (6)
- Highest home attendance: 1,473 vs. Melbourne Victory (14 November 2009); W-League
- Lowest home attendance: 579 vs. Perth Glory (31 October 2009); W-League
- Average home league attendance: 993
- Biggest win: 6–0 vs. Perth Glory (H) (7 November 2009); W-League; 6–0 vs. Newcastle Jets (A) (5 December 2009); W-League
- Biggest defeat: 1–2 vs. Perth Glory (A) (28 November 2009); W-League; 2–3 vs. Sydney FC (A) (5 December 2009); W-League Grand Final
Home colours	Away colours

The 2009 season was Brisbane Roar Football Club (W-League)'s second season, in the W-League. Brisbane Roar finished 3rd in their W-League season, and finished as runners-up in the Grand Final.

== Players ==
Squad retrieved from recent articles. Note: Flags indicate national team as defined under FIFA eligibility rules; some limited exceptions apply. Players may hold more than one non-FIFA nationality.

No.	Pos.	Nation	Player
1	GK	AUS	Casey Dumont
2	DF	AUS	Kate McShea
3	DF	AUS	Karla Reuter
4	DF	AUS	Clare Polkinghorne (Captain)
5	DF	AUS	Brooke Spence
6	FW	AUS	Jo Burgess
7	DF	AUS	Pam Bignold
8	MF	AUS	Elise Kellond-Knight
9	FW	AUS	Jenna Tristram
10	FW	AUS	Lana Harch

No.	Pos.	Nation	Player
11	MF	AUS	Aivi Luik
12	MF	AUS	Stephanie Latham
13	MF	AUS	Tameka Butt
14	FW	AUS	Sasha McDonnell
15	MF	AUS	Leah Curtis
16	MF	AUS	Lauren Colthorpe
17	FW	AUS	Emily Gielnik
18	FW	AUS	Courtney Beutel
19	MF	AUS	Ellen Beaumont
20	GK	AUS	Kate Stewart

== Transfers ==
=== Transfers in ===
- Jo Burgess (Sydney FC)
- Pam Bignold (The Gap SC)
- Aivi Luik (FC Indiana)
- Leah Curtis (The Gap SC)
- Emily Gielnik (Redlands United)

=== Transfers out ===
- Tashina Roma
- Vedrana Popovic
- Veronica Williams
- Ruth Blackburn
- Kim Carroll
- Alicia Ferguson

== Competitions ==
=== Overall record ===
Competition	First match	Last match	Starting round	Final position	Record							
Competition	First match	Last match	Starting round	Final position	Pld	W	D	L	GF	GA	GD	Win %
W-League	3 October 2009	5 December 2009	Matchday 1	3rd	10	6	3	1	24	7	+17	60.00
W-League Finals	13 December 2009	19 December 2009	Semi-finals	Runners-up	2	1	0	1	2	4	−2	50.00
Total					12	7	3	2	26	11	+15	58.33

Source: Competitions

=== W-League ===
==== League table ====
Pos	Team	Pld	W	D	L	GF	GA	GD	Pts	Qualification
1	Sydney FC (C)	10	7	2	1	25	10	+15	23	Qualification to Finals series
2	Central Coast Mariners	10	7	1	2	24	7	+17	22	Qualification to Finals series
3	Brisbane Roar	10	6	3	1	24	7	+17	21	Qualification to Finals series
4	Canberra United	10	4	2	4	17	12	+5	14	Qualification to Finals series
5	Melbourne Victory	10	4	2	4	9	10	−1	14	
6	Perth Glory	10	4	1	5	11	22	−11	13	
7	Adelaide United	10	0	3	7	7	31	−24	3	
8	Newcastle Jets	10	0	2	8	7	25	−18	2	

Source: au.soccerway.com
Rules for classification: 1) points; 2) goal difference; 3) number of goals scored.
(C) Champions

==== Results summary ====
Overall								Home						Away					
Pld	W	D	L	GF	GA	GD	Pts	W	D	L	GF	GA	GD	W	D	L	GF	GA	GD
10	6	3	1	24	7	+17	21	3	2	0	13	3	+10	3	1	1	11	4	+7

Source: worldfootball.net

==== Results by round ====
Round	1	2	3	4	5	6	7	8	9	10
Ground	H	A	H	A	H	A	H	H	A	A
Result	W	W	W	D	W	W	D	D	L	W
Position	1	2	1	1	1	1	1	2	3	3
Points	3	6	9	10	13	16	17	18	18	21

Source: worldfootball.net
A = Away; H = Home; W = Win; D = Draw; L = Loss

==== Matches ====
3 October 2009 1	Brisbane Roar	3–0	Canberra United	Brisbane
15:00 AEST	Beutel 32', 68'; Butt 64'	Report		Stadium: Ballymore Stadium; Attendance: 1,174; Referee: Sara Hodson

10 October 2009 2	Melbourne Victory	0–1	Brisbane Roar	Melbourne
18:00 AEDT		Report	Beaumont 83'	Stadium: Epping Stadium; Referee: Catherine Hofmann

18 October 2009 3	Brisbane Roar	1–0	Central Coast Mariners	Brisbane
18:00 AEST	McDonnell 81'	Report		Stadium: Ballymore Stadium; Attendance: 744; Referee: Pru Donohue

25 October 2009 4	Sydney FC	1–1	Brisbane Roar	Sydney
14:15 AEDT	Paaske 34'	Report	Simon 46' (o.g.)	Stadium: Sydney Football Stadium; Referee: Rebecca Durcau

31 October 2009 5	Brisbane Roar	6–0	Perth Glory	Brisbane
14:00 AEST	Harch 8', 54'; Beaumont 21', 80'; Beutel 20'; McDonnell 90+1'	Report		Stadium: Ballymore Stadium; Attendance: 579; Referee: Casey Reibelt

7 November 2009 6	Canberra United	1–2	Brisbane Roar	Canberra
15:00 AEDT	Maciejewski 58'	Report	Burgess 6'; Kellond-Knight 74'	Stadium: McKellar Park; Attendance: 602; Referee: Pru Donohoe

14 November 2009 7	Brisbane Roar	1–1	Melbourne Victory	Brisbane
18:00 AEST	Polkinghorne 49'	Report	Mowbray 88'	Stadium: Ballymore Stadium; Attendance: 1,473; Referee: Casey Reibelt

22 November 2009 8	Brisbane Roar	2–2	Adelaide United	Brisbane
18:00 AEST	Butt 42'; Kellond-Knight 53'	Report	Quigley 10'; Wallace 20'	Stadium: Ballymore Stadium; Referee: Rebecca Durcau

28 November 2009 9	Perth Glory	2–1	Brisbane Roar	Perth
15:00 AWST	Gill 18', 63'	Report	Beutel 11'	Stadium: Clipsal Stadium; Referee: Rebecca Durcau

5 December 2009 10	Newcastle Jets	0–6	Brisbane Roar	Newcastle
16:00 AEDT		Report	Polkinghorne 2'; Butt 19', 26', 66'; Burgess 81'; Harch 90'	Stadium: Wanderers Oval; Referee: Kirralee Gardener

==== Finals series ====
13 December 2009 Semi-finals	Central Coast Mariners	0–1	Brisbane Roar	Gosford
15:00 AEDT		Report	Reuter 62'	Stadium: Bluetongue Stadium; Referee: Kirralee Gardener

19 December 2009 Grand Final	Sydney FC	3–2	Brisbane Roar	Sydney
15:00 AEDT	O'Neill 66'; Walsh 73'; Rydahl 78'	Report	Harch 15'; Butt 90+3' (pen.)	Stadium: Shark Park; Attendance: 1,439; Referee: Kate Jacewicz

== Statistics ==
=== Appearances and goals ===
Last updated 10 October 2009

No.	Pos.	Name	W-League		W-League Finals		Total		Discipline	
No.	Pos.	Name	Apps	Goals	Apps	Goals	Apps	Goals	Yellow card	Red card
1	GK	(Australia) Casey Dumont	2	0	0	0	2	0	0	0
2	DF	(Australia) Kate McShea	2	0	0	0	2	0	0	0
3	DF	(Australia) Karla Reuter	1	0	0	0	1	0	0	0
4	DF	(Australia) Clare Polkinghorne	2	0	0	0	2	0	0	0
5	DF	(Australia) Brooke Spence	2	0	0	0	2	0	0	0
6	FW	(Australia) Jo Burgess	2	0	0	0	2	0	0	0
7	DF	(Australia) Pam Bignold	2	0	0	0	2	0	0	0
8	MF	(Australia) Elise Kellond-Knight	2	0	0	0	2	0	0	0
9	FW	(Australia) Jenna Tristram	0	0	0	0	0	0	0	0
10	FW	(Australia) Lana Harch	1	0	0	0	1	0	0	0
11	MF	(Australia) Aivi Luik	2	0	0	0	2	0	0	0
12	MF	(Australia) Stephanie Latham	0	0	0	0	0	0	0	0
13	MF	(Australia) Tameka Butt	1	1	0	0	1	1	0	0
14	FW	(Australia) Sasha McDonnell	1	0	0	0	1	0	0	0
15	MF	(Australia) Leah Curtis	1	0	0	0	1	0	0	0
16	MF	(Australia) Lauren Colthorpe	1	0	0	0	1	0	0	0
17	??	(Australia) Emily Gielnik	0	0	0	0	0	0	0	0
18	FW	(Australia) Courtney Beutel	2	2	0	0	2	2	0	0
19	MF	(Australia) Ellen Beaumont	2	1	0	0	2	1	0	0
20	GK	(Australia) Kate Stewart	0	0	0	0	0	0	0	0
