= 2016–17 Brisbane Roar FC (women) season =

Brisbane Roar W-League
2016–17 season
- Manager: Melissa Andreatta
- Stadium: A.J. Kelly Park, Brisbane; Suncorp Stadium, Brisbane
- W-League: 7th
- W-League finals series: DNQ
- Top goalscorer: Tameka Butt and Katrina Gorry (5 goals)
- Highest home attendance: 4,515 vs Adelaide United (11 December 2016)
- Lowest home attendance: 1,327 vs Melbourne City (4 December 2016)
- Average home league attendance: 2,478
Home colours	Away colours	Third colours

The 2016–17 Brisbane Roar W-League season was the club's ninth season in the W-League, the premier competition for women's football in Australia. The team played home games at Spencer Park, A.J. Kelly Park and Suncorp Stadium.

== Players ==
Note: Flags indicate national team as defined under FIFA eligibility rules; some limited exceptions apply. Players may hold more than one non-FIFA nationality.

No.	Pos.	Nation	Player
1	GK	AUS	Mackenzie Arnold
2	DF	DEN	Nina Frausing-Pedersen
3	FW	AUS	Amy Chapman
4	DF	AUS	Clare Polkinghorne (Captain)
6	MF	USA	Celeste Boureille
7	MF	AUS	Ayesha Norrie
8	DF	AUS	Kaitlyn Torpey
9	MF	HKG	Cheung Wai Ki
10	MF	AUS	Katrina Gorry

No.	Pos.	Nation	Player
11	DF	AUS	Natalie Tathem
12	FW	AUS	Allira Toby
13	MF	AUS	Tameka Butt
14	DF	AUS	Summer O'Brien
15	FW	AUS	Abbey Lloyd
16	FW	AUS	Hayley Raso
18	MF	AUS	Lulu Pullar
19	DF	AUS	Hollie Palmer
20	GK	AUS	Georgina Worth
30	GK	AUS	Kirsten Vereen

=== Transfers in ===
No.	Pos.	Nat.	Name	Age	Moving from	Type	Transfer window	Ends	Transfer fee	Source
1	GK	(Australia)	Mackenzie Arnold	22	Perth Glory	Transfer	Pre-season		Free	
18	MF	(United States)	Maddy Evans	25	(United States) Orlando Pride	Transfer	Pre-season	2017	Free	
2	DF	(Denmark)	Nina Frausing-Pedersen	25	(Sweden) FC Rosengård	Transfer	Pre-season	2017	Free	
8	DF	(Australia)	Kaitlyn Torpey	16		Transfer	Pre-season		Free	
20	GK	(Australia)	Georgina Worth	19		Transfer	Pre-season		Free	
7	MF	(Australia)	Sunny Franco	19	Sydney FC	Transfer	Pre-season	2017	Free	
15	FW	(Australia)	Abbey Lloyd	20	(Australia) South West Queensland Thunder	Transfer	Pre-season		Free	
19	DF	(Australia)	Natalie Tathem	20		Transfer	Pre-season		Free	

=== Transfers out ===
No.	Pos.	Nat.	Name	Age	Moving to	Type	Transfer window	Transfer fee	Source
8	MF	(Australia)	Ayesha Norrie	19	Melbourne Victory	Transfer	Pre-season		
7	FW	(Australia)	Gabe Marzano	24	Sydney FC	Transfer	Pre-season		
15	DF	(Australia)	Ruth Blackburn	24		Transfer	Pre-season		
1	GK	(United States)	Haley Kopmeyer	26	(United States) Seattle Reign FC	Loan return	Pre-season		

== Squad statistics ==
N	Pos.	Nat.	Name	Total					W-League
N	Pos.	Nat.	Name	Apps	Goals	Yellow card	Second yellow card	Red card	Apps	Goals	Yellow card	Second yellow card	Red card
1	GK	(Australia)	Mackenzie Arnold	11	0	0	0	1	11+0	0	0	0	1
2	DF	(Denmark)	Nina Frausing-Pedersen	11	0	1	0	0	11+0	0	1	0	0
3	FW	(Australia)	Amy Chapman	12	1	1	0	0	12+0	1	1	0	0
4	DF	(Australia)	Clare Polkinghorne	12	1	2	0	0	12+0	1	2	0	0
5	DF	(Australia)	Brooke Spence	9	0	0	0	0	0+9	0	0	0	0
6	DF	(Australia)	Angela Beard	11	0	1	0	0	10+1	0	1	0	0
7	MF	(Australia)	Sunny Franco	6	0	1	0	0	2+4	0	1	0	0
8	DF	(Australia)	Katelyn Torpey	10	0	0	0	0	8+2	0	0	0	0
9	FW	(Australia)	Cortnee Vine	3	0	0	0	0	1+2	0	0	0	0
10	MF	(Australia)	Katrina Gorry	12	5	3	0	0	12+0	5	3	0	0
11	MF	(Australia)	Maili Forbes	6	0	2	0	0	5+1	0	2	0	0
12	FW	(Australia)	Allira Toby	10	2	1	0	0	1+9	2	1	0	0
13	MF	(Australia)	Tameka Butt	11	5	2	0	0	10+1	5	2	0	0
14	DF	(Australia)	Summer O'Brien	12	0	2	0	0	12+0	0	2	0	0
15	FW	(Australia)	Abbey Lloyd	2	0	0	0	0	0+2	0	0	0	0
17	FW	(Australia)	Emily Gielnik	12	1	0	0	0	12+0	1	0	0	0
18	MF	(United States)	Maddy Evans	12	0	1	0	0	12+0	0	1	0	0
19	DF	(Australia)	Natalie Tathem	1	0	0	0	0	0+1	0	0	0	0
20	GK	(Australia)	Georgina Worth	2	0	0	0	0	1+1	0	0	0	0
30	GK	(Australia)	Ayana Aoyagi	0	0	0	0	0	0+0	0	0	0	0

- Last updated: 4 January 2018
- (yellow card) = Number of bookings; (second yellow card) = Number of sending offs after a second yellow card; (red card) = Number of sending offs by a direct red card.

== Competitions ==
=== W-League ===
==== League table ====
Pos	Team	Pld	W	D	L	GF	GA	GD	Pts	Qualification
1	Canberra United	12	7	2	3	33	21	+12	23	Qualification to Finals series
2	Perth Glory	12	7	2	3	22	18	+4	23	Qualification to Finals series
3	Sydney FC	12	7	1	4	22	16	+6	22	Qualification to Finals series
4	Melbourne City (C)	12	6	2	4	19	14	+5	20	Qualification to Finals series
5	Newcastle Jets	12	4	3	5	18	18	0	15	
6	Adelaide United	12	3	5	4	31	26	+5	14	
7	Brisbane Roar	12	4	1	7	15	21	−6	13	
8	Western Sydney Wanderers	12	4	1	7	14	29	−15	13	
9	Melbourne Victory	12	2	3	7	17	28	−11	9	

Source: A-Leagues
Rules for classification: 1) points; 2) goal difference; 3) number of goals scored.
(C) Champions

==== Results summary ====
Overall								Home						Away					
Pld	W	D	L	GF	GA	GD	Pts	W	D	L	GF	GA	GD	W	D	L	GF	GA	GD
12	4	1	7	15	21	−6	13	3	0	3	10	10	0	1	1	4	5	11	−6

Last updated: 24 November 2017.
Source: Competitive Matches

==== Results by round ====
Round	1	2	3	4	5	6	7	8	9	10	11	12	13	14
Ground	H	A	H	A	H	H	A	A	B	H	H	A	A	B
Result	W	D	L	W	L	W	L	L	✖	L	W	L	L	✖
Position	2	3	5	3	5	5	5	6	5	6	5	5	6	7

Updated to match(es) played on 24 November 2017. Source: Competitive Matches
A = Away; H = Home; B = Bye; W = Win; D = Draw; L = Loss

==== Matches ====
5 November 2016 1	Brisbane Roar	2–1	Sydney FC	Brisbane
16:00 AEST	Toby 55'; Gorry 66'	Report	Foord 52'	Stadium: Spencer Park; Attendance: 3,105; Referee: Casey Reibelt

12 November 2016 2	Perth Glory	0–0	Brisbane Roar	Perth
16:00 AWST		Report		Stadium: Dorrien Gardens; Attendance: 659; Referee: Lara Lee

20 November 2016 3	Brisbane Roar	0–1	Canberra United	Brisbane
16:00 AEST		Report	Sykes 54'	Stadium: A.J. Kelly Park; Attendance: 1,613; Referee: Rachel Mitchenson

26 November 2016 4	Western Sydney Wanderers	0–2	Brisbane Roar	Sydney
15:00 AEDT		Report	Polkinghorne 28'; Butt 38'	Stadium: Marconi Stadium; Attendance: 350; Referee: Rebecca Durcau

4 December 2016 5	Brisbane Roar	1–2	Melbourne City	Brisbane
16:00 AEST	Gorry 2'	Report	Fishlock 6'; Tymrak 25'	Stadium: A.J. Kelly Park; Attendance: 1,327; Referee: Kate Jacewicz

11 December 2016 6	Brisbane Roar	3–2	Adelaide United	Brisbane
13:30 AEST	Gorry 4'; Butt 12'; Toby 49'	Report	Jones 59'; Huerta 74' (pen.)	Stadium: Suncorp Stadium; Attendance: 4,515; Referee: Casey Reibelt

18 December 2016 7	Canberra United	5–1	Brisbane Roar	Gosford
14:30 AEDT	Flannery 13', 53'; Ochs 28' (pen.); Sykes 50', 56'	Report	Gielnik 90+2'	Stadium: Central Coast Stadium; Attendance: 818; Referee: Lara Lee

23 December 2016 8	Sydney FC	1–0	Brisbane Roar	Sydney
19:30 AEDT	Ibini 54'	Report		Stadium: Lambert Park; Attendance: 714; Referee: Katie Patterson

1 January 2017 10	Brisbane Roar	1–4	Melbourne Victory	Brisbane
16:00 AEST	Chapman 42'	Report	Spiranovic 18'; Dowie 45', 72', 90+3'	Stadium: A.J. Kelly Park; Attendance: 1,805; Referee: Lara Lee

7 January 2017 11	Brisbane Roar	3–0	Western Sydney Wanderers	Brisbane
13:35 AEST	Butt 3', 6'; Mathyssen-Whyman 75' (o.g.)	Report		Stadium: Suncorp Stadium; Attendance: 2,503; Referee: Kelly Jones

15 January 2017 12	Newcastle Jets	2–1	Brisbane Roar	Newcastle
14:30 AEDT	O'Brien 9' (o.g.); Hoy 90+2'	Report	Butt 45' (pen.)	Stadium: McDonald Jones Stadium; Attendance: 2,146; Referee: Casey Reibelt

22 January 2017 13	Melbourne City	3–1	Brisbane Roar	Melbourne
17:00 AEDT	Tabain 18'; Stott 62', 90+2'	Report	Gorry 67'	Stadium: CB Smith Reserve; Attendance: 478; Referee: Lara Lee
