= 2017–18 Brisbane Roar FC (women) season =

Brisbane Roar W-League
2017–18 season
- Manager: Jeff Hopkins
- Stadium: A.J. Kelly Park, Kippa-Ring; Suncorp Stadium, Brisbane
- W-League: Premiers
- W-League finals series: Semi-finals
- Top goalscorer: Allira Toby (5 goals)
- Highest home attendance: 4,225 vs Canberra United; 4 February 2018
- Lowest home attendance: 1,288 vs Newcastle Jets; 10 December 2017
- Average home league attendance: 3,158
Home colours	Away colours	Third colours

The 2017–18 Brisbane Roar W-League season was the club's tenth season in the W-League, the premier competition for women's soccer in Australia. The team played home games both at A.J. Kelly Park and Suncorp Stadium.

== Players ==
Note: Flags indicate national team as defined under FIFA eligibility rules; some limited exceptions apply. Players may hold more than one non-FIFA nationality.

No.	Pos.	Nation	Player
1	GK	AUS	Mackenzie Arnold
2	DF	USA	Carson Pickett (on loan from Seattle Reign FC)
3	MF	AUS	Amy Chapman
4	DF	AUS	Clare Polkinghorne (Captain)
6	MF	USA	Celeste Boureille (on loan from Portland Thorns FC)
7	MF	AUS	Ayesha Norrie
8	DF	AUS	Kaitlyn Torpey
9	FW	HKG	Cheung Wai Ki
10	MF	AUS	Katrina Gorry
11	MF	AUS	Natalie Tathem

No.	Pos.	Nation	Player
12	FW	AUS	Allira Toby
13	MF	AUS	Tameka Butt
14	DF	AUS	Summer O'Brien
15	FW	AUS	Abbey Lloyd
16	FW	AUS	Hayley Raso
17	FW	AUS	Emily Gielnik
18	MF	AUS	Lucinda Pullar
19	DF	AUS	Hollie Palmer
20	GK	AUS	Georgina Worth
30	GK	AUS	Kirsten Veeren

=== Transfers in ===
No.	Pos.	Nat.	Name	Age	Moving from	Type	Transfer window	Ends	Transfer fee	Source
9	MF	(Hong Kong)	Cheung Wai Ki	26		Transfer	Pre-season		Free	
16	MF	(Australia)	Hayley Raso	23	(United States) Portland Thorns FC	Transfer	Pre-season		Free	
7	MF	(Australia)	Ayesha Norrie	20	Melbourne Victory	Transfer	Pre-season		Free	
6	MF	(United States)	Celeste Boureille	23	(United States) Portland Thorns FC	Loan	Pre-season		Free	
2	DF	(United States)	Carson Pickett	24	(United States) Seattle Reign FC	Loan	Pre-season		Free	
19	DF	(Australia)	Hollie Palmer	16		Transfer	Pre-season		Free	
18	MF	(Australia)	Lucinda Pullar	19		Transfer	Pre-season		Free	
30	GK	(Australia)	Kirsten Veeren			Transfer	Pre-season		Free	

=== Transfers out ===
No.	Pos.	Nat.	Name	Age	Moving to	Type	Transfer window	Transfer fee	Source
18	MF	(United States)	Maddy Evans	26	(United States) Orlando Pride	Transfer	Pre-season	Free	
7	MF	(Australia)	Sunny Franco	20	Western Sydney Wanderers	Transfer	Pre-season	Free	
6	DF	(Australia)	Angela Beard	20	Melbourne Victory	Transfer	Pre-season	Free	
2	DF	(Denmark)	Nina Frausing-Pedersen	26	(Denmark) Brøndby IF	Transfer	Pre-season	Free	
9	FW	(Australia)	Cortnee Vine	19	Newcastle Jets	Transfer	Pre-season	Free	
6	MF	(United States)	Celeste Boureille		(United States) Portland Thorns FC	Loan return	Mid-season	Free	
2	DF	(United States)	Carson Pickett		(United States) Seattle Reign	Loan return	Mid-season	Free	

== Squad statistics ==
N	Pos.	Nat.	Name	Total					W-League					W-League finals series
N	Pos.	Nat.	Name	Apps	Goals	Yellow card	Second yellow card	Red card	Apps	Goals	Yellow card	Second yellow card	Red card	Apps	Goals	Yellow card	Second yellow card	Red card
1	GK	(Australia)	Mackenzie Arnold	12	0	1	0	0	11+0	0	1	0	0	1+0	0	0	0	0
2	DF	(United States)	Carson Pickett	12	1	0	0	0	11+0	1	0	0	0	1+0	0	0	0	0
3	MF	(Australia)	Amy Chapman	4	0	0	0	0	2+2	0	0	0	0	0+0	0	0	0	0
4	DF	(Australia)	Clare Polkinghorne	12	2	2	0	0	11+0	2	2	0	0	1+0	0	0	0	0
6	MF	(United States)	Celeste Boureille	12	1	2	0	0	11+0	1	2	0	0	1+0	0	0	0	0
7	MF	(Australia)	Ayesha Norrie	6	0	0	0	0	1+5	0	0	0	0	0+0	0	0	0	0
8	DF	(Australia)	Kaitlyn Torpey	10	0	0	0	0	9+0	0	0	0	0	1+0	0	0	0	0
9	FW	(Hong Kong)	Cheung Wai Ki	9	0	1	0	0	7+2	0	1	0	0	0+0	0	0	0	0
10	MF	(Australia)	Katrina Gorry	12	2	1	0	0	11+0	2	1	0	0	1+0	0	0	0	0
11	MF	(Australia)	Natalie Tathem	6	0	1	0	0	2+4	0	1	0	0	0+0	0	0	0	0
12	FW	(Australia)	Allira Toby	11	5	0	0	0	6+4	5	0	0	0	1+0	0	0	0	0
13	MF	(Australia)	Tameka Butt	11	1	1	0	0	10+0	1	1	0	0	1+0	0	0	0	0
14	DF	(Australia)	Summer O'Brien	12	0	2	0	0	10+1	0	2	0	0	1+0	0	0	0	0
15	FW	(Australia)	Abbey Lloyd	11	2	1	0	0	4+6	2	0	0	0	0+1	0	1	0	0
16	FW	(Australia)	Hayley Raso	10	4	1	0	0	9+0	4	1	0	0	1+0	0	0	0	0
17	FW	(Australia)	Emily Gielnik	8	2	0	0	0	6+1	2	0	0	0	1+0	0	0	0	0
18	MF	(Australia)	Lucinda Pullar	1	0	0	0	0	0+1	0	0	0	0	0+0	0	0	0	0
19	DF	(Australia)	Hollie Palmer	2	0	0	0	0	0+2	0	0	0	0	0+0	0	0	0	0
20	GK	(Australia)	Georgina Worth	0	0	0	0	0	0+0	0	0	0	0	0+0	0	0	0	0
30	GK	(Australia)	Kristen Veeren	0	0	0	0	0	0+0	0	0	0	0	0+0	0	0	0	0

- (yellow card) = Number of bookings; (second yellow card) = Number of sending offs after a second yellow card; (red card) = Number of sending offs by a direct red card.

== Competitions ==
=== W-League ===
==== League table ====
Pos	Team	Pld	W	D	L	GF	GA	GD	Pts	Qualification
1	Brisbane Roar	12	9	1	2	21	12	+9	28	Qualification to Finals series
2	Sydney FC	12	8	1	3	26	16	+10	25	Qualification to Finals series
3	Newcastle Jets	12	6	2	4	26	21	+5	20	Qualification to Finals series
4	Melbourne City (C)	12	6	2	4	20	15	+5	20	Qualification to Finals series
5	Canberra United	12	5	1	6	24	27	−3	16	
6	Perth Glory	12	4	2	6	25	27	−2	14	
7	Melbourne Victory	12	3	2	7	15	19	−4	11	
8	Western Sydney Wanderers	12	3	2	7	13	21	−8	11	
9	Adelaide United	12	3	1	8	15	27	−12	10	

Source: A-Leagues
Rules for classification: 1) points; 2) goal difference; 3) number of goals scored.
(C) Champions

==== Results summary ====
Overall								Home						Away					
Pld	W	D	L	GF	GA	GD	Pts	W	D	L	GF	GA	GD	W	D	L	GF	GA	GD
12	9	1	2	21	12	+9	28	4	0	2	10	9	+1	5	1	0	11	3	+8

Source: Competitive Matches

==== Results by round ====
Round	1	2	3	4	5	6	7	8	9	10	11	12	13	14
Ground	A	H	A	H	B	A	H	H	A	H	B	A	A	H
Result	W	L	W	W	✖	W	L	W	W	W	✖	D	W	W
Position	2	5	4	2	3	2	3	1	1	1	1	1	1	1

Source: Competitive Matches
A = Away; H = Home; B = Bye; W = Win; D = Draw; L = Loss

==== Matches ====
Win Draw Loss

27 October 2017 1	Sydney FC	1–3	Brisbane Roar	Sydney
17:20 AEDT	Sonnett 80' (pen.)	Report	Gorry 1'; Toby 37', 84'	Stadium: Allianz Stadium; Attendance: 2,707; Referee: Katie Patterson

5 November 2017 2	Brisbane Roar	1–4	Perth Glory	Brisbane
13:30 AEST	Polkinghorne 43'	Report	Hill 42', 59', 83'; Kerr 77' (pen.)	Stadium: Suncorp Stadium; Attendance: 4,120; Referee: Maddison Kennedy

10 November 2017 3	Western Sydney Wanderers	0–1	Brisbane Roar	Sydney
19:30 AEDT		Report	Pickett 30'	Stadium: Marconi Stadium; Attendance: 389; Referee: Rachel Mitchenson

17 November 2017 4	Brisbane Roar	1–0	Adelaide United	Brisbane
16:20 AEST	Raso 86'	Report		Stadium: Suncorp Stadium; Attendance: 2,127; Referee: Rebecca Durcau

3 December 2017 6	Canberra United	0–1	Brisbane Roar	Canberra
16:30 AEDT		Report	Butt 67'	Stadium: McKellar Park; Attendance: 1,126; Referee: Katie Patterson

10 December 2017 7	Brisbane Roar	0–3	Newcastle Jets	Brisbane
16:30 AEST		Report	Gilliland 15', 31', 40'	Stadium: A.J. Kelly Park; Attendance: 1,288; Referee: Casey Reibelt

17 December 2017 8	Brisbane Roar	2–0	Melbourne City	Brisbane
15:30 AEST	Toby 62'; Gorry 72'	Report		Stadium: Suncorp Stadium; Attendance: 3,204; Referee: Lara Lee

29 December 2017 9	Perth Glory	0–2	Brisbane Roar	Perth
19:00 AWST		Report	Raso 59'; Toby 66'	Stadium: Dorrien Gardens; Attendance: 1,046; Referee: Rebecca Durcau

5 January 2018 10	Brisbane Roar	2–1	Melbourne Victory	Brisbane
16:20 AEST	Polkinghorne 56'; Boureille 80'	Report	Ayres 22'	Stadium: Suncorp Stadium; Referee: Rachel Mitchenson

21 January 2018 12	Melbourne City	0–0	Brisbane Roar	Melbourne
16:30 AEDT		Report		Stadium: AAMI Park; Attendance: 3,170; Referee: Rachael Mitchenson

28 January 2018 13	Adelaide United	2–4	Brisbane Roar	Adelaide
16:00 ACDT	Doniak 22'; Condon 60'	Report	Raso 20'; Toby 74'; McCormick 83' (o.g.); Gielnik 90+1'	Stadium: Marden Sports Complex; Attendance: 630; Referee: Kelly Jones

4 February 2018 14	Brisbane Roar	4–1	Canberra United	Brisbane
15:30 AEST	Raso 11'; Gielnik 40'; Lloyd 72', 90'	Report	Thorsnes 74'	Stadium: Suncorp Stadium; Attendance: 4,225; Referee: Lara Lee

==== Finals series ====
11 February 2018 Semi-final	Brisbane Roar	0–2	Melbourne City	Brisbane
16:00 AEST		Report	Luik 66'; Fishlock 72'	Stadium: Perry Park; Attendance: 3,870; Referee: Rebecca Durcau

== See also ==
- 2017–18 Brisbane Roar FC season
