= 2018–19 Brisbane Roar FC (women) season =

Brisbane Roar W-League
2018–19 season
- Manager: Jeff Hopkins
- Stadium: A.J. Kelly Park, Kippa-Ring; Suncorp Stadium, Brisbane
- W-League: 2nd
- Top goalscorer: Allira Toby (3 goals)
Home colours	Away colours

The 2018–19 Brisbane Roar W-League season was the club's eleventh season in the W-League, the premier competition for women's soccer in Australia. The team played home games both at A.J. Kelly Park and Suncorp Stadium.

== Players ==
=== Squad information ===
Last updated 1 November 2018 Note: Flags indicate national team as defined under FIFA eligibility rules; some limited exceptions apply. Players may hold more than one non-FIFA nationality.

No.	Pos.	Nation	Player
1	GK	AUS	Mackenzie Arnold
2	DF	USA	Carson Pickett
4	DF	AUS	Clare Polkinghorne (captain)
5	DF	AUS	Jenna McCormick
6	MF	USA	Celeste Boureille
7	FW	AUS	Indiah-Paige Riley
8	DF	AUS	Kaitlyn Torpey
9	FW	ENG	Chioma Ubogagu
10	MF	AUS	Katrina Gorry
11	DF	AUS	Natalie Tathem

No.	Pos.	Nation	Player
12	FW	AUS	Allira Toby
14	DF	AUS	Summer O'Brien
15	FW	AUS	Abbey Lloyd
16	FW	AUS	Hayley Raso
17	MF	JPN	Yūki Nagasato
18	MF	AUS	Leah Davidson
19	FW	AUS	Hollie Palmer
20	GK	AUS	Annalee Grove
21	DF	AUS	Dani Ward
22	MF	AUS	Anna Margraf

=== Transfers in ===
No.	Pos.	Nat.	Name	Age	Moving from	Type	Transfer window	Ends	Transfer fee	Source
5	MF	(Australia)	Jenna McCormick	24	Adelaide United	Transfer	Pre-season			
9	FW	(England)	Chioma Ubogagu	26	(United States) Orlando Pride	Loan	Pre-season			
17	FW	(Japan)	Yūki Nagasato	31	(United States) Chicago Red Stars	Loan	Pre-season			
20	GK	(Australia)	Annalee Grove	17	Newcastle Jets	Transfer	Pre-season			

=== Transfer out ===
No.	Pos.	Nat.	Name	Age	Moving to	Type	Transfer window	Transfer fee	Source
7	MF	(Australia)	Ayesha Norrie	21	(United States) LA Galaxy OC	Transfer	Pre-season		
17	FW	(Australia)	Emily Gielnik	26	Melbourne Victory	Transfer	Pre-season		
13	MF	(Australia)	Tameka Butt	27	(Norway) Klepp IL	Transfer	Pre-season		
9	FW	(Hong Kong)	Cheung Wai Ki	27		Transfer	Pre-season		
3	MF	(Australia)	Amy Chapman	31		Transfer	Pre-season		
18	MF	(Australia)	Lucina Pullar	20		Transfer	Pre-season		
30	GK	(Australia)	Kirsten Veeren			Transfer	Pre-season		

== W-League ==
=== League table ===
Pos	Team	Pld	W	D	L	GF	GA	GD	Pts	Qualification
1	Melbourne Victory	12	7	3	2	21	15	+6	24	Qualification to Finals series and 2019 AFC Women's Club Championship
2	Brisbane Roar	12	6	2	4	18	17	+1	20	Qualification to Finals series
3	Sydney FC (C)	12	6	1	5	28	19	+9	19	Qualification to Finals series
4	Perth Glory	12	5	4	3	28	20	+8	19	Qualification to Finals series
5	Melbourne City	12	6	1	5	20	15	+5	19	
6	Adelaide United	12	5	3	4	17	19	−2	18	
7	Newcastle Jets	12	5	1	6	18	21	−3	16	
8	Canberra United	12	3	4	5	13	18	−5	13	
9	Western Sydney Wanderers	12	1	1	10	11	30	−19	4	

Source: A-Leagues
Rules for classification: 1) points; 2) goal difference; 3) number of goals scored.
(C) Champions

=== Matches ===
Win Draw Loss

28 October 2018 1	Brisbane Roar	1–1	Perth Glory	Brisbane
	Pickett 88'	Report	Mautz 54'	Stadium: Suncorp Stadium; Attendance: 3,796; Referee: Rachael Mitchenson

4 November 2018 2	Western Sydney Wanderers	0–1	Brisbane Roar	Sydney
		Report	Pickett 39'	Stadium: Marconi Stadium; Attendance: 713; Referee: Katie Patterson

18 November 2018 3	Brisbane Roar	0–1	Adelaide United	Brisbane
		Report	Latsko 51'	Stadium: Lions Stadium; Attendance: 1,286; Referee: Lara Lee

29 November 2018 5	Newcastle Jets	0–1	Brisbane Roar	Newcastle
		Report	Ubogagu 56'	Stadium: McDonald Jones Stadium; Attendance: 1,405; Referee: Rachel Mitchenson

9 December 2018 6	Sydney FC	5–1	Brisbane Roar	Sydney
	Foord 15', 67', 83'; Polias 59'; Ibini 70'	Report	Nagasato 25'	Stadium: Seymour Shaw Park; Attendance: 1,566; Referee: Lara Lee

16 December 2018 7	Brisbane Roar	4–3	Melbourne Victory	Brisbane
	Toby 10'; Dumont 47' (o.g.); Dowie 61' (o.g.); Nagasato 90'	Report	Nairn 23'; Dowie 82'; Gielnik 90+2'	Stadium: Lions Stadium; Attendance: 1,045; Referee: Katie Patterson

20 December 2018 8	Brisbane Roar	3–1	Western Sydney Wanderers	Brisbane
	Miramontez 34' (o.g.); Riley 70'; Toby 86'	Report	Yeoman-Dale 63'	Stadium: Dolphin Oval; Attendance: 2,389; Referee: Casey Reibelt

27 December 2018 9	Canberra United	1–1	Brisbane Roar	Canberra
	Mulaudzi 3'	Report	Toby 38'	Stadium: McKellar Park; Attendance: 1,358; Referee: Katie Patterson

11 January 2019 11	Melbourne City	0–1	Brisbane Roar	Melbourne
		Report	Ubagagu 74'	Stadium: AAMI Park; Attendance: 3,760; Referee: Kate Jacewicz

19 January 2019 12	Brisbane Roar	1–3	Sydney FC	Brisbane
	Toby 41'	Report	Tobin 31'; Foord 38' (pen.) 75'	Stadium: Lions Stadium; Attendance: 2,118; Referee: Lara Lee

25 January 2019 13	Brisbane Roar	4–1	Canberra United	Brisbane
	Raso 19'; Boureille 32'; Nagasato 70'; Toby 73'	Report	Flannery 62'	Stadium: Suncorp Stadium; Attendance: 2,589; Referee: Kate Jacewicz

1 February 2019 14	Adelaide United	1–0	Brisbane Roar	Adelaide
	Jonsdottir 13'	Report		Stadium: Marden Sports Complex; Attendance: 672; Referee: Rachel Mitchenson

==== Finals Series ====
10 February 2019 Semi-final	Brisbane Roar	1–2	Sydney FC	Brisbane
18:15 AEST	Nagasato 90+2'	Source	Foord 33'; Huerta 68'	Stadium: Dolphin Oval; Attendance: 4,271; Referee: Rebecca Durcau

=== Results summary ===
Overall								Home						Away					
Pld	W	D	L	GF	GA	GD	Pts	W	D	L	GF	GA	GD	W	D	L	GF	GA	GD
12	6	2	4	18	17	+1	20	3	1	2	13	10	+3	3	1	2	5	7	−2

Last updated: February 2019, end of regular season.
Source: Competitive Matches

=== Results by round ===
Round	1	2	3	4	5	6	7	8	9	10	11	12	13	14
Ground	H	A	H	B	A	A	H	H	A	B	A	H	H	A
Result	D	W	L	✖	W	L	W	W	D	✖	W	L	W	L
Position	3	2	5	5	5	6	3	3	3	4	2	3	2	2

Updated to match(es) played on February 2019. Source: Competitive Matches
A = Away; H = Home; B = Bye; W = Win; D = Draw; L = Loss
