= 2014 Brisbane Roar FC (women) season =

Brisbane Roar WFC
2014 season
- Chairman: Dali Tahir
- Manager: Belinda Wilson
- Stadium: Suncorp Stadium / Perry Park / QSAC
- W-League: 6th
- Top goalscorer: Tameka Butt (7)
Home colours	Away colours

The 2014 Brisbane Roar FC W-League season was the club's seventh participation in the W-League, since the league's formation in 2008.

== Players ==
=== Squad information ===
Note: Flags indicate national team as defined under FIFA eligibility rules; some limited exceptions apply. Players may hold more than one non-FIFA nationality.

No.	Pos.	Nation	Player
1	GK	GER	Nadine Angerer
2	DF	AUS	Laura Alleway
3	DF	AUS	Amy Chapman
4	DF	AUS	Clare Polkinghorne (Captain)
5	DF	AUS	Brooke Spence
6	FW	AUS	Hayley Raso
7	DF	AUS	Kim Carroll (Vice-Captain)
8	MF	AUS	Elise Kellond-Knight (Vice-Captain)
9	FW	AUS	Larissa Crummer
10	MF	AUS	Katrina Gorry

No.	Pos.	Nation	Player
11	MF	AUS	Vedrana Popovic
13	MF	AUS	Tameka Butt
14	DF	AUS	Natasha Wheeler
15	DF	AUS	Brooke Goodrich
16	DF	AUS	Angela Beard
17	FW	AUS	Emily Gielnik
18	MF	AUS	Sunny Franco
19	MF	AUS	Ayesha Norrie
20	GK	AUS	Kate Stewart
21	GK	AUS	Teagan Micah

=== Transfers ===
==== In ====
Date	Pos.	Name	From	Contract	Fee
September 2014	MF	(Australia) Tameka Butt	(Japan) Iga F.C. Kunoichi		Loan return
September 2014	MF	(Australia) Elise Kellond-Knight	(Japan) Iga F.C. Kunoichi		Loan return
September 2014	DF	(Australia) Clare Polkinghorne	(Japan) INAC Kobe Leonessa		Loan return
8 September 2014	DF	(Australia) Angela Beard	(Australia) QAS		
8 September 2014	GK	(Australia) Teagan Micah	(Australia) QAS		

==== Out ====
Date	Pos.	Name	To	Contract	Fee
22 February 2014	FW	(Australia) Joanne Burgess	Retired	N/A	N/A
May 2014	MF	(Australia) Tameka Butt	(Japan) Iga F.C. Kunoichi		Loan
May 2014	MF	(Australia) Elise Kellond-Knight	(Japan) Iga F.C. Kunoichi		Loan
18 June 2014	DF	(Australia) Clare Polkinghorne	(Japan) INAC Kobe Leonessa		Loan
8 September 2014	MF	(Australia) Erika Elze	Released		N/A

== Competitions ==
=== W-League ===
==== Regular season ====
14 September 2014 1	Perth Glory	2–1	Brisbane Roar	Bassendean
12:00 AWST	K. Gill 12', 53' (pen.)	Report	Gielnik 90+4' (pen.)	Stadium: Ashfield Reserve; Referee: Rachel Mitchenson

21 September 2014 2	Brisbane Roar	1–2	Sydney FC	Nathan
15:00 AEST	Gielnik 37'	Report	Rollason 17', 76'; Allen (yellow card) ?' (red card) 61'	Stadium: QSAC; Referee: Rebecca Durcau

27 September 2014 3	Brisbane Roar	3–1	Newcastle Jets	Bowen Hills
16:00 AEST	Gielnik 10'; Raso 28', 51'	Report	Dobson 78'	Stadium: Perry Park; Referee: Katie Patterson

4 October 2014 4	Canberra United	2–0	Brisbane Roar	Canberra
17:00 AEST	Field 36'; Kellond-Knight 57' (o.g.)	Report		Stadium: McKellar Park; Attendance: 762; Referee: Rachel Mitchenson

12 October 2014 5	Brisbane Roar	1–2	Western Sydney Wanderers	Brisbane
13:00 AEST	Butt 45+1'	Report	Carney 30'; Crummer 55' (o.g.)	Stadium: Suncorp Stadium; Referee: Casey Reibelt

19 October 2014 6	Brisbane Roar	1–1	Melbourne Victory	Yeronga
14:00 AEST	Franco 82'	Report	Jackson 69'	Stadium: Goodwin Park; Referee: Kirralee Andruschak

25 October 2014 7	Newcastle Jets	4–1	Brisbane Roar	Broadmeadow
13:00 AEDT	Huster 36' van Egmond 37', 67' (pen.); Alleway 48' (o.g.)	Report	Butt 90'	Stadium: Wanderers Oval; Attendance: 562; Referee: Rebecca Durcau

1 November 2014 8	Sydney FC	1–1	Brisbane Roar	Leichardt
17:00 AEDT	Spencer 85'	Report	Butt 65'	Stadium: Lambert Park; Referee: Kate Jacewicz

8 November 2014 9	Brisbane Roar	3–0	Adelaide United	Brisbane
16:30 AEST	Butt 26', 74'; Gielnik 30'	Report		Stadium: Suncorp Stadium; Referee: Kelly Jones

16 November 2014 10	Melbourne Victory	2–1	Brisbane Roar	Albert Park
15:00 AEDT	Quigley 44'; Nairn 80'	Report	Raso 2'	Stadium: Lakeside Stadium

29 November 2014 11	Brisbane Roar	2–1	Canberra United	Brisbane
13:00 AEST	Butt 40'; Gorry 47'	Report	Sykes 28'	Stadium: Suncorp Stadium

7 December 2014 12	Western Sydney Wanderers	1–3	Brisbane Roar	Penrith
15:00 AEDT	Petinos 66'	Report	Gorry 20'; Butt 41'; Franco 85'	Stadium: Sportingbet Stadium; Referee: Katie Patterson

== Statistics ==
=== Results summary ===
Overall								Home						Away					
Pld	W	D	L	GF	GA	GD	Pts	W	D	L	GF	GA	GD	W	D	L	GF	GA	GD
12	4	2	6	18	19	−1	14	3	1	2	11	7	+4	1	1	4	7	12	−5

Last updated: 7 December 2014.
Source: Competitive Matches

=== Ladder ===
Pos	Team	Pld	W	D	L	GF	GA	GD	Pts	Qualification
1	Perth Glory	12	10	0	2	39	10	+29	30	Qualification to Finals series
2	Melbourne Victory	12	6	2	4	26	15	+11	20	Qualification to Finals series
3	Canberra United (C)	12	6	2	4	22	18	+4	20	Qualification to Finals series
4	Sydney FC	12	5	3	4	17	16	+1	18	Qualification to Finals series
5	Newcastle Jets	12	5	2	5	25	21	+4	17	
6	Brisbane Roar	12	4	2	6	18	19	−1	14	
7	Adelaide United	12	3	1	8	9	29	−20	10	
8	Western Sydney Wanderers	12	2	2	8	14	42	−28	8	

Source: au.soccerway.com
Rules for classification: 1) points; 2) goal difference; 3) number of goals scored.
(C) Champions

=== Results and position per round ===
Round	1	2	3	4	5	6	7	8	9	10	11	12
Ground	A	H	H	A	H	H	A	A	H	A	H	A
Result	L	L	W	L	L	D	L	D	W	L	W	W
Position	5	6	5	6	6	6	8	8	7	7	6	6

Updated to match(es) played on 7 December 2014. Source: Competitive Matches
A = Away; H = Home; W = Win; D = Draw; L = Loss

=== League Goalscorers per Round ===
Total	Player		Goals per Round											
Total	Player		1	2	3	4	5	6	7	8	9	10	11	12
7	(Australia)	Tameka Butt					1		1	1	2		1	1
4	(Australia)	Emily Gielnik	1	1	1						1			
3	(Australia)	Hayley Raso			2							1		
2	(Australia)	Katrina Gorry											1	1
2	(Australia)	Sunny Franco						1						1
18	TOTAL		1	1	3	0	1	1	1	1	3	1	2	3

== Awards ==
- Player of the Week (Round 6) – Katrina Gorry
