= 2011 W-League grand final =

- Event: 2010–11 W-League
Sydney FC	Brisbane Roar
1	2
- Date: 12 February 2011
- Venue: Campbelltown Stadium, Campbelltown, Sydney, New South Wales, Australia
- Referee: Kate Jacewicz
- Attendance: 1,872

The 2011 W-League grand final was the grand final of the third season of the Australian W-League football (soccer) competition. It was contested between premiers Sydney FC and second-placed Brisbane Roar at Campbelltown Stadium in Campbelltown on Saturday, 12 February 2011. Brisbane Roar were victorious, winning 2–1.

== Match details ==
12 February 2011

Sydney FC	1–2	Brisbane Roar
Ledbrook 35'	Report; Summary	Butt 9'; De Vanna 64'

Campbelltown Stadium, Campbelltown
Attendance: 1,872
Referee: Kate Jacewicz

Sydney FC	Brisbane Roar

SYDNEY FC:
GK	1	(Australia) Dimi Poulos
DF	3	(Australia) Danielle Brogan
DF	15	(Australia) Teigen Allen		(substituted off) 68'
DF	2	(Australia) Teresa Polias
MF	6	(Australia) Servet Uzunlar
MF	8	(Australia) Renee Rollason		(substituted off) 76'
MF	10	(Australia) Kylie Ledbrook (c)	(yellow card) 36'	(substituted off) 90'
MF	11	(United States) Lydia Vandenbergh
FW	15	(Australia) Caitlin Foord
FW	17	(Australia) Kyah Simon
FW	19	(Australia) Leena Khamis	(yellow card) 74'
Substitutes:
MF	14	(Australia) Nicola Bolger		(substituted on) 68'
MF	16	(Australia) Linda O'Neill		(substituted on) 90'
FW	13	(Australia) Catherine Cannuli		(substituted on) 76'
GK	20	(Australia) Erin Herd
DF	5	(Australia) Alanna Kennedy
Manager:
(Australia) Alen Stajcic

BRISBANE ROAR:
GK	1	(Australia) Casey Dumont
DF	4	(Australia) Clare Polkinghorne (c)	(yellow card) 71'
DF	5	(Australia) Brooke Spence
DF	7	(Australia) Kim Carroll
MF	6	(Australia) Joanne Burgess		(substituted off) 84'
MF	8	(Australia) Elise Kellond-Knight
MF	11	(Australia) Aivi Luik
MF	13	(Australia) Tameka Butt
MF	16	(Australia) Lauren Colthorpe
FW	10	(Australia) Lana Harch		(substituted off) 42'
FW	14	(Australia) Amy Chapman		(substituted off) 67'
Substitutes:
DF	3	(Australia) Karla Reuter		(substituted on) 84'
FW	18	(Trinidad and Tobago) Kennya Cordner		(substituted on) 67'
FW	19	(Australia) Lisa De Vanna	(yellow card) 67'	(substituted on) 42'
GK	20	(Australia) Kate Stewart
DF	2	(Australia) Laura Alleway
Manager:
(Wales) Jeff Hopkins

Player of the Match:
Tameka Butt (Brisbane Roar)

Assistant referees:
Sarah Ho
Allyson Flynn
Fourth official:
Kirralee Gardiner

== See also ==
- List of W-League champions
