= Teagan Micah =

Australian soccer player (born 1997)

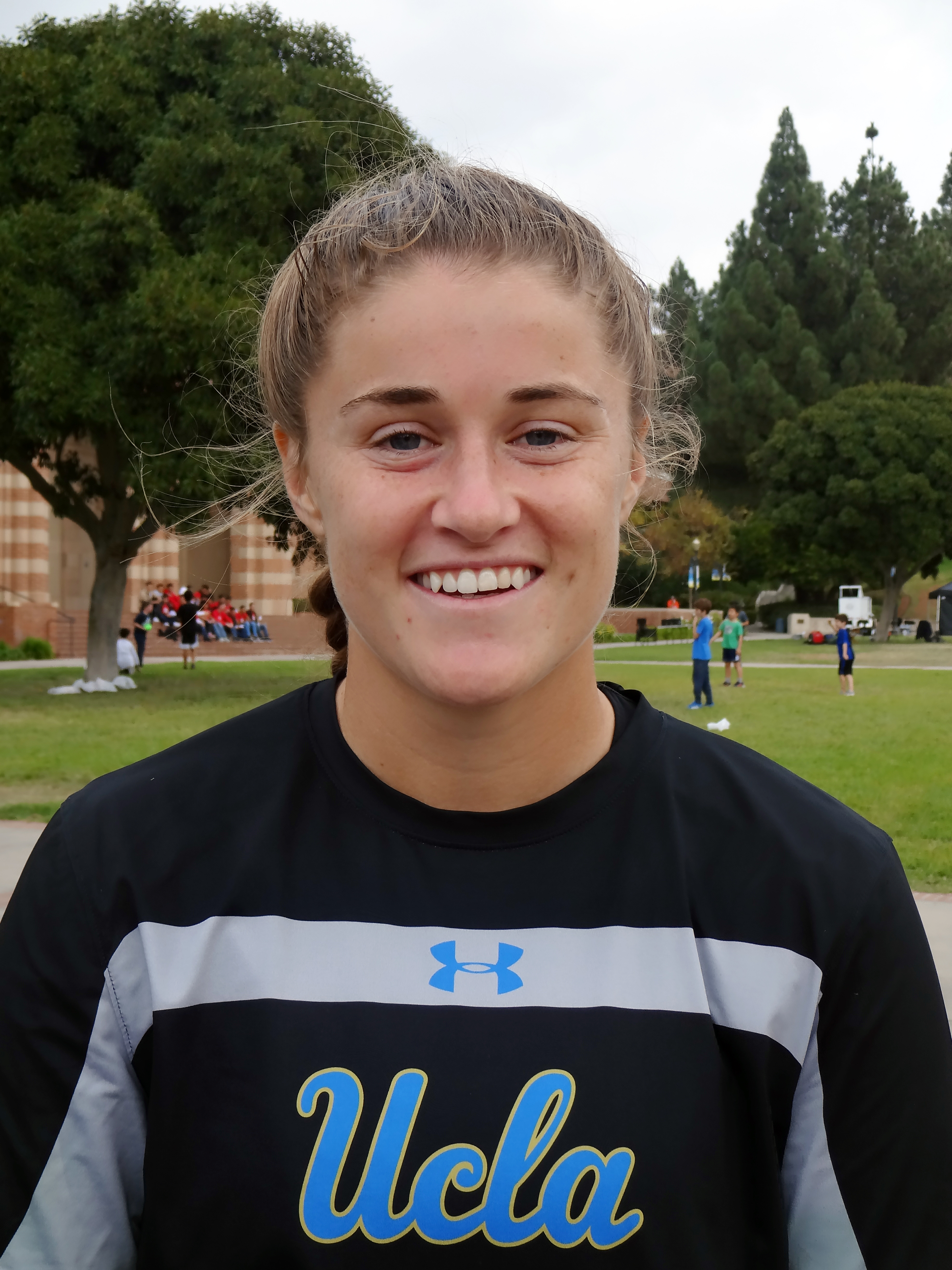
- Micah at the University of California, Los Angeles (UCLA) in 2019

Personal information
- Full name: Teagan Jade Micah
- Date of birth: 20 October 1997 (age 29)
- Place of birth: Moe, Victoria, Australia
- Height: 1.76 m (5 ft 9 in)
- Position: Goalkeeper

Team information
- Current team: OL Lyonnes
- Number: 21

Youth career
- Moe United

College career
Years	Team	Apps	(Gls)
2016–2019	UCLA Bruins	84	(0)

Senior career*
Years	Team	Apps	(Gls)
2013–2015	Brisbane Roar	0	(0)
2015–2016	Western Sydney Wanderers	5	(0)
2019–2020	Melbourne Victory	0	(0)
2020	Arna-Bjørnar	12	(0)
2020–2021	Melbourne City	8	(0)
2021	Sandviken	6	(0)
2021–2023	Rosengård	33	(0)
2023–2025	Liverpool	14	(0)
2025–	Lyon	1	(0)

International career^{‡}
2012–2013	Australia U-17	5	(0)
2015	Australia U-20	5	(0)
2017–	Australia	26	(0)
- * Club domestic league appearances and goals as of 5 November 2025 ‡ National team caps and goals as of 10 July 2025

Teagan Jade Micah (/ˈmaɪkə/ MYE-kə; born 20 October 1997) is an Australian professional soccer player who plays as a goalkeeper for Première Ligue club OL Lyonnes and the Australia national team.

== Early life ==
Micah was born and raised in the Gippsland town of Moe in regional Victoria, where she played in the junior system at local soccer club Moe United for three seasons. At the age of 10, she moved to Redcliffe, Queensland, where she attended Redcliffe State High School. She trained with the Goalkeeping Australia Academy from the age of thirteen, in addition to playing for the Queensland Academy of Sport.

== College career ==
In 2016, Micah received a full soccer scholarship to the University of California, Los Angeles (UCLA). In her freshman season at UCLA, Micah played every minute of every game and became the first freshman goalkeeper to start UCLA's opening match since 2004. Micah earned nine shutouts over the course of the season and was named Pac-12 Goalkeeper of the Week three times. In her sophomore season at UCLA, Micah played in all of UCLA's 25 games, including the College Cup final.

== Club career ==
Micah signed with the W-League's Brisbane Roar FC, aged 16. During her two years at the club she served as a back-up keeper.

Micah moved to the Western Sydney Wanderers FC for the 2015–16 W-League season. She made her W-League debut aged 18 and went on to appear 5 times for the Wanderers.

Following her UCLA career, Micah returned to the W-League for the 2019–20 season. She served as a backup keeper to fellow Matildas keeper Casey Dumont.

Micah signed with Norwegian Toppserien side Arna-Bjørnar ahead of the 2020 season.

In November 2020, Micah returned to Australia for the European winter break, signing with Melbourne City. She returned to Norway and Arna-Bjørnar's rivals from Bergen, IL Sandviken, in May 2021.

In August 2021, only a few months after joining IL Sandviken and following her playing at the 2020 Summer Olympics, Micah joined Swedish club Rosengård on a two-year contract.

In July 2023, Micah signed for English club Liverpool. On 3 May 2025, Liverpool announced that Micah would leave the club upon the expiration of her contract at the end of the season.

On 18 July 2025, OL Lyonnes announced the signing of Micah to a one-year contract, after her contract with Liverpool had expired.

== International career ==
After stints with Australia's U-17 and U-20 national teams, Micah earned her first senior national team call-up for the 2017 Tournament of Nations. She was again named to the national team roster for a friendly against the United States in April 2019. The following month, Teagan was announced as a member of Australia's squad for the 2019 FIFA Women's World Cup.

Micah was a member of the Matildas Tokyo 2020 Olympics squad. The Matildas qualified for the quarter-finals and beat Great Britain before being eliminated in the semi-final with Sweden. In the playoff for the Bronze medal they were beaten by the USA. In July 2023, Micah was named to the 23 player squad to represent Australia, on home soil, at the 2023 FIFA Women's World Cup.

On 4 June 2024, Micah was named in the Matildas team which qualified for the Paris 2024 Olympics, her second Olympic games selection.

== Career statistics ==
=== Club ===
As of match played 9 February 2025

Appearances and goals by club, season and competition
Club	Season	League			National cup (Note: includes Norwegian Cup, Svenska Cupen, Women's FA Cup)		League cup (Note: includes FA Women's League Cup)		Total	
Club	Season	Division	Apps	Goals	Apps	Goals	Apps	Goals	Apps	Goals
Brisbane Roar	2013–14	W-League	0	0	—		—		0	0
Brisbane Roar	2014	W-League	0	0	—		—		0	0
Brisbane Roar	Total		0	0	—		—		0	0
Western Sydney Wanderers	2015–16	W-League	5	0	—		—		5	0
Melbourne Victory	2019–20	W-League	0	0	—		—		0	0
Arna-Bjørnar	2020	Toppserien	12	0	0	0	—		12	0
Melbourne City	2020–21	W-League	8	0	—		—		8	0
IL Sandviken	2021	Toppserien	6	0	0	0	—		6	0
Rosengård	2021	Damallsvenskan	7	0	0	0	—		7	0
Rosengård	2022	Damallsvenskan	21	0	5	0	—		26	0
Rosengård	2023	Damallsvenskan	5	0	0	0	—		5	0
Rosengård	Total		33	0	5	0	—		38	0
Liverpool	2023–24	Women's Super League	7	0	1	0	2	0	10	0
Liverpool	2024–25	Women's Super League	6	0	0	0	2	0	8	0
Liverpool	Total		13	0	1	0	4	0	18	0
Career total			77	0	6	0	4	0	87	0

=== International ===
As of match played 10 April 2024

Appearances and goals by national team and year
National Team	Year	Apps	Goals
Australia	2021	8	0
Australia	2022	6	0
Australia	2023	3	0
Total		17	0
