= Los Angeles Strikers =

LA Strikers FC
- Full name: Los Angeles Strikers Football Club
- Founded: 2011
- Stadium: Jack Kemp Stadium, Occidental College
- Capacity: 2500
- Coach: Tracey Kevins
- League: USL W-League
- 2020: 2nd, Western Conference; Playoffs: Conference Final
| Home colours | Away colours |

Los Angeles Strikers Football Club is an American women's soccer team, founded in 2011. The team is a member of the United Soccer Leagues W-League, the second tier of women's soccer in the United States and Canada. The team plays in the Western Conference. The team plays its home games at Jack Kemp Stadium at Occidental College. The club's colors are red, black and white.

== Year-by-year ==
| Year | Division | League | Reg. season | Playoffs |
|---|---|---|---|---|
| 2017/18 | 2 | USL W-League | 6th, Western | did not qualify |
| 2018/19 | 2 | USL W-League | 7th, Western | did not qualify |
| 2019/20 | 2 | USL W-League | 2nd, Western | Conference Final |
