= Lauren Colthorpe =

Australian soccer player

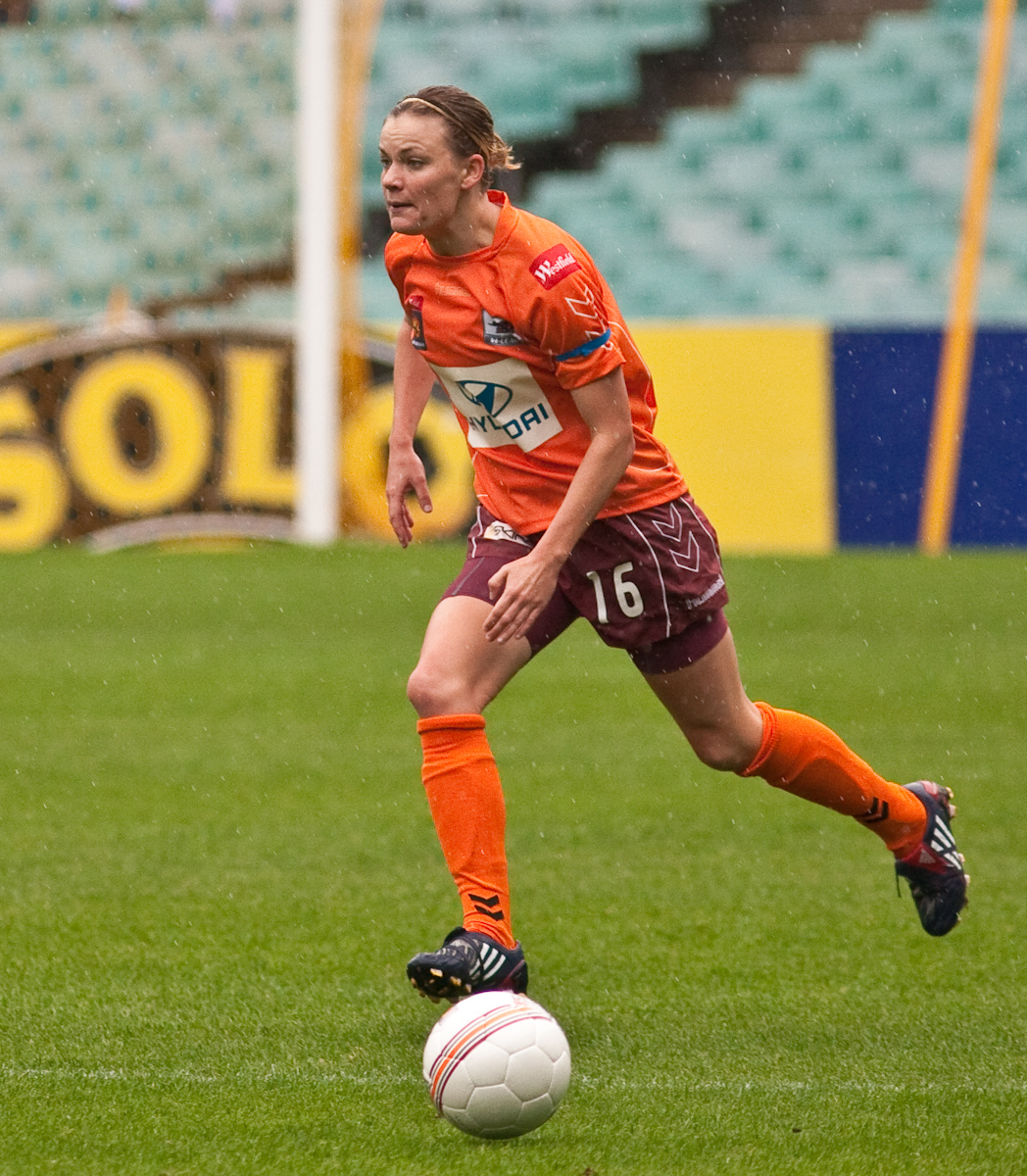
- Colthorpe playing for Brisbane Roar in 2009

Personal information
- Full name: Lauren Elizabeth Colthorpe
- Date of birth: 25 October 1985 (age 41)
- Place of birth: Newcastle, New South Wales, Australia
- Height: 1.73 m (5 ft 8 in)
- Positions: Central midfielder; right full back

Youth career
- Warners Bay Panthers
- Macquarie Reps
- NSWIS
- AIS

Senior career*
Years	Team	Apps	(Gls)
2008–2011	Brisbane Roar	28	(5)
2009–2010	Fortuna Hjørring	9	(2)
2010-2012	Brisbane Roar	6	(1)

International career^{‡}
2004	Australia U-20	5	(0)
2005–2011	Australia	51	(7)
- * Club domestic league appearances and goals as of 29 June 2011 ‡ National team caps and goals as of 3 July 2011

Lauren Elizabeth Colthorpe (born 25 October 1985) is an Australian women's football (soccer) player who plays as a midfielder.

== Club career ==
Colthorpe joined the Brisbane Roar for the inaugural season of the Westfield W-League in 2008, winning the double in the first season. Colthorpe has featured in all three seasons of the league.

== International career ==
Colthorpe went along with the U-19s national side to Thailand to participate in 2004 FIFA U-19s Women's World Championships. Colthorpe then made her first full debut for the Matilda's in November 2005 in Gosford, New South Wales when Australia defeated China 3–1 in a friendly match. Colthorpe was a part of The Matilda's side that reached the quarter-finals of the 2007 women's world cup. In the quarter-final against Brazil, she scored with a header to level the score at 2–2 before Brazil eventually triumphed 3–2. In 2010, Colthorpe helped Australia win their first silverware in the Asian Cup, mainly playing out of right fullback for most of the campaign.

== Career statistics ==
=== International goals ===
Scores and results list Australia's goal tally first.

#	Date	Venue	Opponent	Score	Result	Competition
1	23 February 2007	Zhongshan Soccer Stadium, Taipei, Taiwan	Uzbekistan	3–0	10–0	2008 Olympic qualifying
2	23 September 2007	Tianjin Olympic Center Stadium, Tianjin, China	Brazil	2–2	2–3	2007 FIFA Women's World Cup
3	3 May 2008	Legion Field, Birmingham, United States	United States	3–4	4–5	Friendly
4	13 October 2008	Thanh Long Sports Centre, Ho Chi Minh City, Vietnam	Singapore	1–0	6–0	2008 AFF Women's Championship
5	13 October 2008	Thanh Long Sports Centre, Ho Chi Minh City, Vietnam	Singapore	2–0	6–0	2008 AFF Women's Championship
6	18 October 2008	Thanh Long Sports Centre, Ho Chi Minh City, Vietnam	Myanmar	3–0	5–1	2008 AFF Women's Championship
7	20 June 2011	Jahnstadion, Göttingen, Germany	Mexico	1–2	3–2	Friendly

== Honours ==
=== Club ===
Brisbane Roar

- W-League Premiership: 2008–09
- W-League Championship: 2008–09, 2010–11

=== Country ===
Australia

- AFC Women's Asian Cup: 2010
- AFF Women's Championship: 2008
- OFC U-20 Women's Championship: 2004
