= Allira Toby =

Australian association football player

Personal information
- Date of birth: 15 August 1994 (age 32)
- Place of birth: Ipswich, Australia
- Height: 1.60 m (5 ft 3 in)
- Position: Forward

Team information
- Current team: NSW NPLW Sydney Olympic FC
- Number: 10

Senior career*
Years	Team	Apps	(Gls)
2015	Olympic FC	18	(7)
2015–2016	Adelaide United	12	(0)
2016–2020	Brisbane Roar	40	(14)
2019–2020	Moreton Bay United	7	(3)
2020–2021	Sydney FC	14	(0)
2021–	Canberra United	0	(0)
- * Club domestic league appearances and goals as of 9 September 2021

Allira Toby (born 15 August 1994) is an Australian soccer player, who currently plays for Sydney Olympic FC in the NSW NPLW.

== Club career ==
=== Junior football ===
Toby grew up in Ipswich, Queensland and began her junior career with Ipswich City Bulls. At 16 she joined Annerley FC followed by Olympic FC.

=== Adelaide United ===
Toby was recruited to Adelaide United in the W-League for the 2015–16 season. She subsequently moved back to Queensland to play with the Roar.

=== Brisbane Roar ===
Toby would go on to win Roar's Golden Boot award with 5 goals in their W-League Premiership winning campaign in 2017/18. She would win the club's Golden Boot award again in the following season after another 5 goal haul.

=== Famalicão ===
In October 2020, Toby was offered a one-year contract by Portuguese club Famalicão. She flew over and was involved in a pre-season friendly in Spain. A few weeks later the club contacted her to tell her they terminated her contract.

=== Sydney FC ===
In December 2020, Toby returned to Australia, joining Sydney FC.

=== Canberra United ===
In September 2021, Toby joined Canberra United.

== Personal life ==
Toby is Aboriginal Australian, and works as a counsellor assisting Aboriginal and Torres Strait Islander school students.
