= Celeste Boureille =

American soccer player

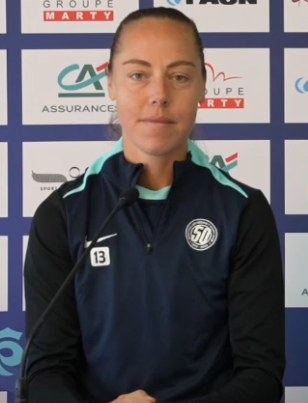
- Boureille in 2024

Personal information
- Full name: Celeste Anais Boureille
- Date of birth: April 20, 1994 (age 32)
- Place of birth: San Francisco, California, United States
- Height: 5 ft 9 in (1.75 m)
- Position: Defensive midfielder

Team information
- Current team: Leicester City
- Number: 6

Youth career
- Mustang Soccer Club
- Sacred Heart Cathedral Preparatory

College career
Years	Team	Apps	(Gls)
2012–2015	California Golden Bears	84	(16)

Senior career*
Years	Team	Apps	(Gls)
2014	Selfoss	9	(3)
2016–2021	Portland Thorns	49	(0)
2016–2017	→ Canberra United (loan)	13	(0)
2017–2020	→ Brisbane Roar (loan)	26	(1)
2020	→ Fleury (loan)	13	(1)
2022	AC Milan	7	(2)
2022–2025	Montpellier	63	(4)
2025–	Leicester City	6	(0)

International career^{‡}
2017	United States U23	3	(0)
- * Club domestic league appearances and goals as of 14 December 2025 ‡ National team caps and goals as of May 6, 2019

Celeste Anais Boureille (French: [sə.lɛst a.nɛj bu.ʁɛj]; born April 20, 1994) is an American soccer player who plays as a midfielder for Women's Super League 2 (WSL2) club Leicester City.

== Early life ==
Boureille is the daughter of Max Boureille, a chef, and Carol Jenkins. She grew up in the Bay area, attending Sacred Heart Cathedral Preparatory, where she was a three-time All-West Catholic Athletic League (WCAL) selection and the 2012 WCAL Player of the Year. She played her club soccer for Mustang Soccer Club with whom she reached the 2010 National league title. Celeste attributes her early skill evolution to time she spent practicing skills and tricks at Panhandle Park.

== College career ==
Boureille played at the University of California, Berkeley from 2012 to 2015. She appeared in 84 games, scored 16 goals and recorded 8 assists. Boureille won two Pac-12 All-Academic Honorable Mentions in 2013 and 2014. In her final season, 2015, Boureille scored 5 goals and made 2 assists, earning second-team All-Pac-12 accolades as she helped guide Cal to the NCAA Tournament. Boureille graduated as a media studies major.

== Professional career ==
Boureille joined preseason camp with Portland Thorns FC through open tryouts after going undrafted in 2016. Following preseason training camp she was signed to an NWSL contract on April 15, 2016. Throughout her time at Portland, Boureille was utilized as a right back, centerback, and defensive midfielder.

In October 2016, Boureille was loaned to Canberra United for the 2016–17 W-League season.

In October 2017, Boureille was loaned to Brisbane Roar for the 2017–18 W-League and 2018–19 W-League seasons. Boureille flourished in Australia, being named the 2017–18 Brisbane Roar Player of the Year. She followed this with a BRFC Players' Player award for the 2018–19 season.

On July 18, 2022, Boureille signed for French club Montpellier.

On August 5, 2025, Boureille signed a one-year contract for English club Leicester City.

== Honors ==
Portland Thorns

- NWSL Championship: 2017
- NWSL Challenge Cup: 2021
