= A.J. Kelly Park =

Soccer venue in Kappa-ring, Queensland, Australia

AJ Kelly Park
- Interactive map of AJ Kelly Park
- Location: Kippa-Ring
- Coordinates: 27°13′45″S 153°5′40″E
- Owner: Queensland Government
- Capacity: 3,000
- Surface: Grass
- Record attendance: 1,500 (Peninsula Power vs Sydney United 58, 28 August 2022)

Construction
- Renovated: 2006

Tenants
- Peninsula Power, Brisbane Roar W-League, Brisbane Roar Youth

AJ Kelly Park is a football (soccer) venue located at Kippa-Ring, Queensland, Australia. It is home to Peninsula Power.

== Development ==
In 2006, AJ Kelly Park unveiled the upgrade of its dressing rooms and also a new disability access ramp. The construction of the ramp had taken nearly six years to be completed due to lack of funds by the Peninsula Power. A new stand was built during the 2010/11 season to increase the capacity of the ground. The stand was built to the right of the clubhouse, in front of the ramp
