= Magic Park =

Soccer stadium in Newcastle, New South Wales

Coordinates: 32°55′13.7″S 151°43′51.6″E

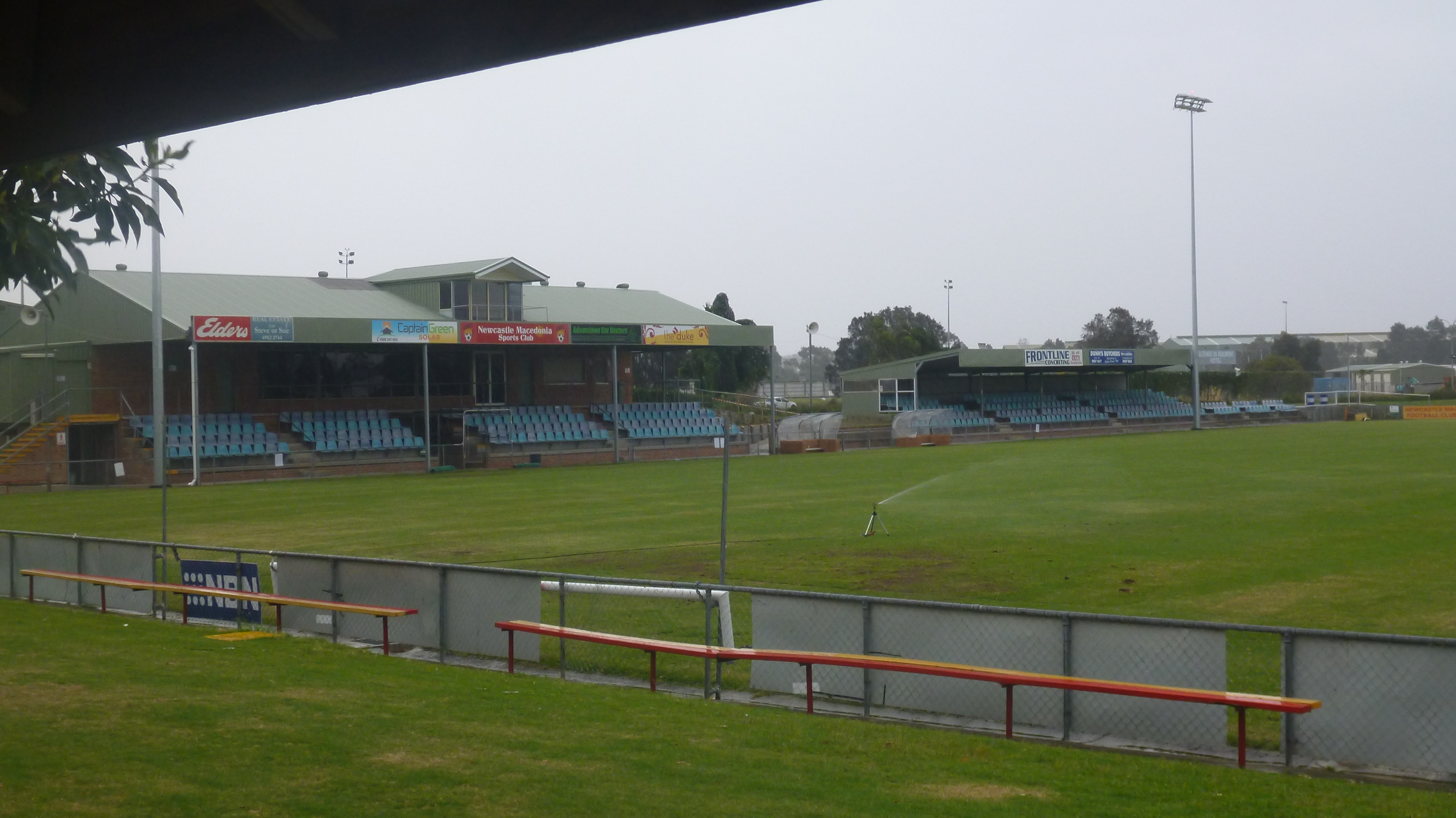
- View of the grandstands in October 2013
- Interactive map of Magic Park
- Location: Cnr Curley Rd & Denney St; Broadmeadow, New South Wales
- Owner: Broadmeadow Magic FC
- Capacity: 3,500 (500 seated)
- Record attendance: 4,000
- Public transit: Broadmeadow (400 m); Lambton Rd at Curley Rd (450 m)

Construction
- Opened: 2000

Tenant
- Broadmeadow Magic FC

Magic Park (formerly known as Wanderers Oval) is a soccer stadium in Newcastle, Australia. It is the home ground for the Broadmeadow Magic Football Club and had occasionally been used by Newcastle Jets women and youth sides. It was one of 11 training sites for the 2015 AFC Asian Cup. In 2014, it hosted the first televised match of the FFA Cup (now Australia Cup).
