= Lana Harch =

Australian soccer player

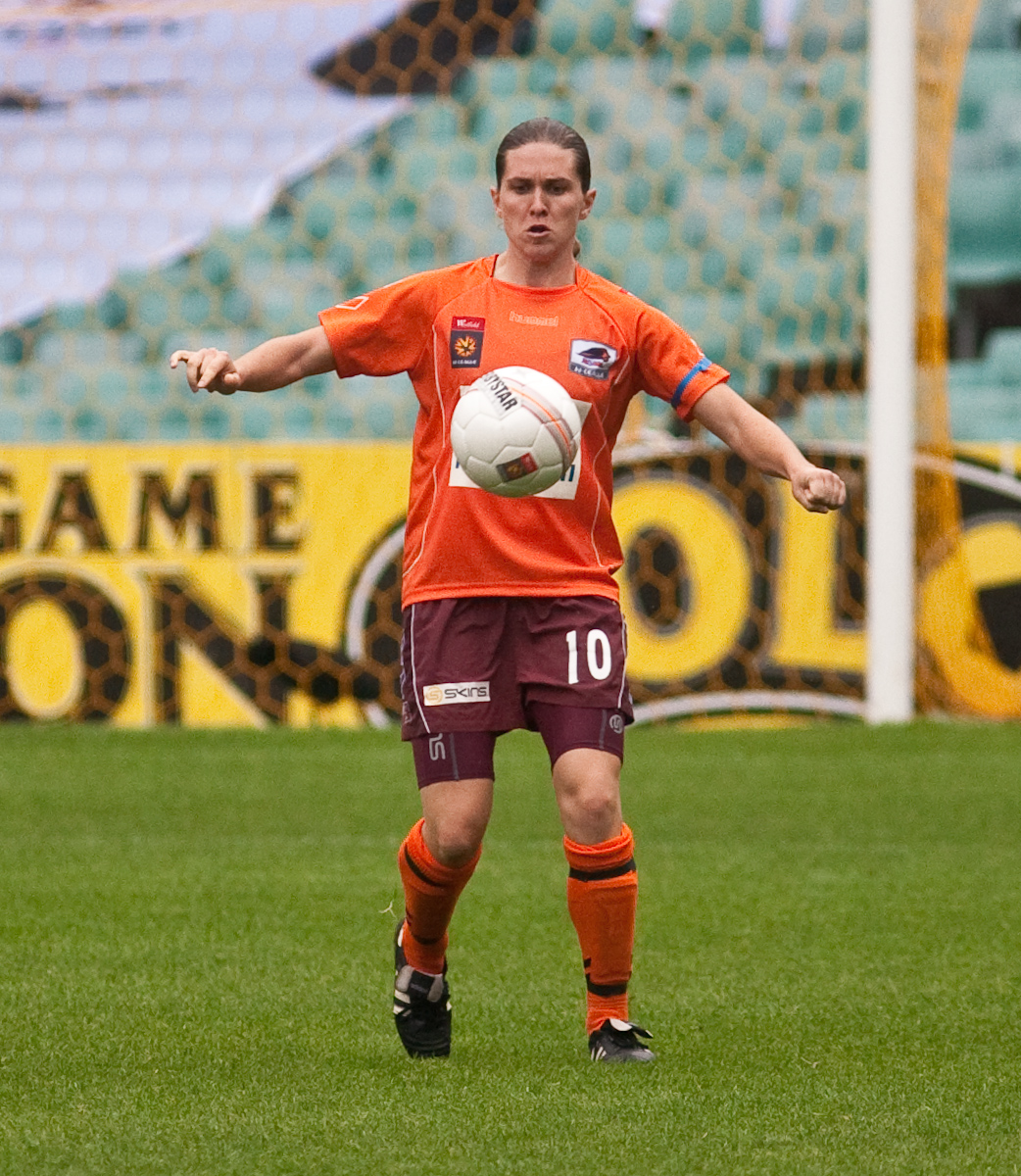

Personal information
- Date of birth: 23 November 1984 (age 41)
- Place of birth: Hampton, Queensland, Australia
- Height: 1.66 m (5 ft 5 1/2 in)
- Position: Striker

Team information
- Current team: South West Queensland Thunder

Senior career*
| Years | Team | Apps | (Gls) |
- West Wanderers
- Toowoomba Raiders
- QAS
| 2008–2013 | Queensland Roar | 23 | (10) |

International career
| 2002 | Australia U-19 | | |
| | Australia | 24 | (5) |
- * Club domestic league appearances and goals

Lana Harch (born 23 November 1984 in Hampton, Queensland, Australia) is a former Australia women's national soccer team international who plays for Queensland Lions FC.

Harch was adjudged player of the match in the 2008–09 W-League Grand Final and was the W-League Player of the Year.

In November 2013, Harch retired from football.

Harch graduated from the University of Southern Queensland and currently works as a teacher at the Westside Christian College in Goodna, Ipswich.

== International goals ==
| No. | Date | Venue | Opponent | Score | Result | Competition |
|---|---|---|---|---|---|---|
| 1. | 6 March 2004 | Govind Park, Ba, Fiji | Fiji | 1–0 | 7–0 | 2004 OFC Women's Olympic Qualifying Tournament |
| 2. | 6 March 2004 | Govind Park, Ba, Fiji | Fiji | 2–0 | 7–0 | 2004 OFC Women's Olympic Qualifying Tournament |
| 3. | 6 March 2004 | Govind Park, Ba, Fiji | Fiji | 5–0 | 7–0 | 2004 OFC Women's Olympic Qualifying Tournament |
| 4. | 23 February 2007 | Zhongshan Soccer Stadium, Taipei, Taiwan | Uzbekistan | 9–0 | 10–0 | 2008 Summer Olympics qualification |
| 5. | 19 July 2007 | BCU International Stadium, Coffs Harbour, Australia | New Zealand | 3–0 | 3–0 | Friendly |

== Honours ==
=== Individual ===
- 2009 Julie Dolan Medal: Best player in the 2008–09 W-League

=== Club ===
- 2008–09 W-League Premiership and Championship with Brisbane Roar
