= Joanne Burgess =

Australian international soccer player

Joey "Joanne" Burgess
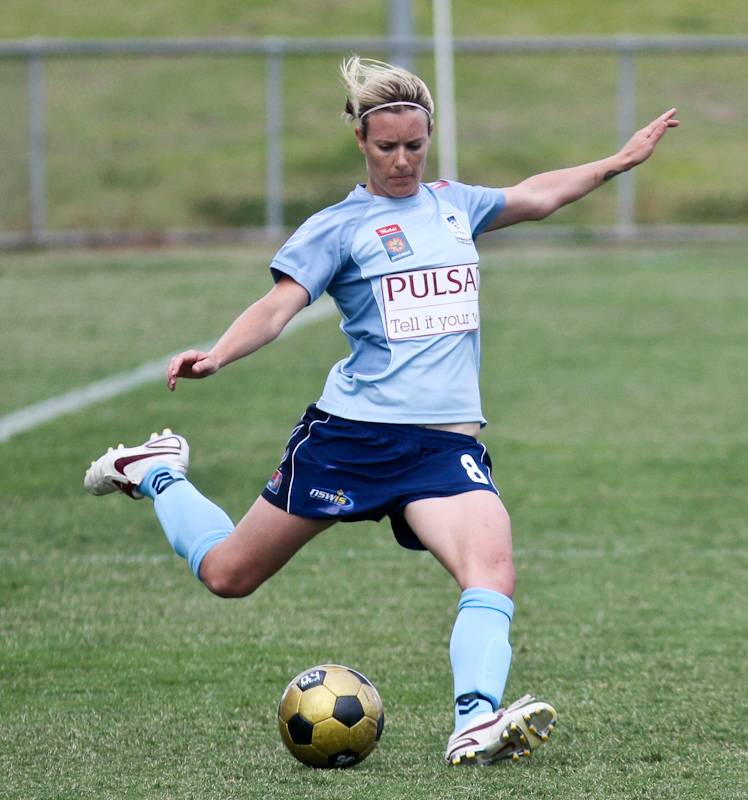
- Burgess playing for Sydney FC in 2008

Personal information
- Full name: Joey Rebecca Burgess
- Date of birth: 23 September 1979 (age 47)
- Place of birth: Sydney, Australia
- Height: 1.67 m (5 ft 5 1/2 in)
- Position: Winger

Senior career*
Years	Team	Apps	(Gls)
2008–2009	Sydney FC	7	(1)
2009–2012	Brisbane Roar	36	(5)
2013–2014	Brisbane Roar	12	(0)
2016–2017	Western Sydney Wanderers	5	(1)
Total		60	(7)

International career
2005–2014	Australia	40	(5)
- * Club domestic league appearances and goals

Joey "Joanne" Rebecca Burgess (born 23 September 1979) is an Australian international soccer player who previously played for the Taree Wildcats in the Mid North Coast League.

== Club career ==
Burgess was raised in Campbelltown and began her career in the National Soccer League during the 1999–2000 season, where she played for the NSW Sapphires.

=== W-League ===
Burgess joined Sydney FC in the inaugural W-League season. Following that one-year stint, Burgess joined Brisbane Roar FC for five years, where she played on the wing.

During her time at Brisbane, she played in four grand finals in 2009, 2011, 2012 and 2014, winning in 2011. After the 2014 W-League Grand Final, Burgess retired from professional soccer.

=== Return from retirement ===
In 2016, Burgess came out of retirement to play for Western Sydney Wanderers as a more experienced player who could help a team that was consistently at the bottom of the table. Burgess was particularly excited to play for the Wanderers, as she grew up in Western Sydney. She retired for a second time after one season with the Wanderers.

== International career ==
Burgess represented Australia 40 times over her career. Her career highlights include playing in the 2006 AFC Women's Asian Cup and the 2007 FIFA Women's World Cup.

Burgess is also an Australian futsal player, representing Australia in the 2008 Women's Futsal World Cup.

=== International goals ===
No.	Date	Venue	Opponent	Score	Result	Competition
1	24 July 2006	Marden Sports Complex, Marden, Australia	Thailand	2–0	5–0	2006 AFC Women's Asian Cup
2	7 April 2007	BCU International Stadium, Coffs Harbour, Australia	Hong Kong	9–0	15–0	2008 Summer Olympics
3	15 April 2007	Zhongshan Soccer Stadium, Zhongshan, Taiwan	Chinese Taipei	10–0	10–0	2008 Summer Olympics

== Honours ==
=== Club ===
Brisbane Roar

- W-League Championship: 2010–11
