= Amy Chapman =

Australian soccer player

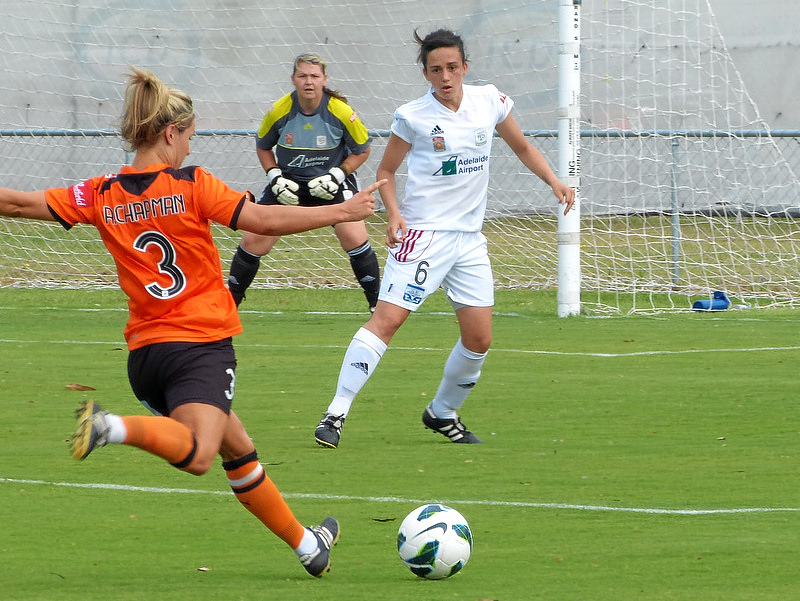
- Amy Chapman playing for Brisbane Roar in 2012

Personal information
- Full name: Amy Lucille Chapman
- Date of birth: February 12, 1987 (age 39)
- Place of birth: Albury, Australia
- Height: 1.64 m (5 ft 5 in)
- Position: Midfielder

Youth career
- 2003–2008: AIS

Senior career*
Years	Team	Apps	(Gls)
2008–2009	Canberra United	12	(1)
2010–2018	Brisbane Roar	63	(10)
2011–2012	LA Strikers	21	(5)

International career
2007–2013	Australia	20	(4)
- * Club domestic league appearances and goals as of 21 February 2018

Amy Lucille Chapman (born 12 February 1987 in Albury) is an Australian former professional association football player, who last played for Brisbane Roar. She represented Australia between 2007 and 2013. She currently serves as football commentator with 10 Sport.

== Playing career ==
Chapman played 12 times for Canberra United in the Australian W-League.

Chapman joined Brisbane Roar in 2010.

In mid-2011 Chapman signed for the Los Angeles Strikers in the USL W-League, playing 21 times in two seasons.

Chapman played for Australia at the 2006 FIFA U-20 Women's World Championship finals in Russia.

In 2007 Chapman made her debut for the Australia women's national soccer team. She made the last of 20 Matildas appearances in 2013.

== International goals ==
No.	Date	Venue	Opponent	Score	Result	Competition
1.	3 March 2008	Stockland Park, Sunshine Coast, Australia	New Zealand	2–1	2–1	Friendly
2.	23 May 2008	Sydney Football Stadium, Sydney, Australia	Canada	1–0	2–1	Friendly
3.	27 June 2008	Suwon Civil Stadium, Suwon, South Korea	Italy	3–0	3–0	2008 Peace Queen Cup
4.	18 October 2008	Thanh Long Sports Centre, Ho Chi Minh City, Vietnam	Myanmar	1–0	5–1	2008 AFF Women's Championship

== Honours ==
=== Club ===
Brisbane Roar:

- W-League Premiership: 2010-11
- W-League Championship: 2012-13

=== International ===
Australia

- AFF Women's Championship: 2008
