= 2017–18 Canberra United FC (women) season =

Canberra United FC
2017–18 season
- Manager: Heather Garriock
- Stadium: McKellar Park
- W-League: 5th
- Top goalscorer: Elise Thorsnes (6 goals)
- Highest home attendance: 1,464 vs. Western Sydney Wanderers; 14 January 2018
- Lowest home attendance: 1,003 vs. Sydney FC; 12 November 2017
- Average home league attendance: 1,127
| Home colours | Away colours |

The 2017–18 Canberra United FC season was the club's tenth season in the W-League, the premier competition for women's soccer in Australia. The team played home games at McKellar Park. The club was managed by Heather Garriock.

== Players ==
=== Squad information ===
Note: Flags indicate national team as defined under FIFA eligibility rules; some limited exceptions apply. Players may hold more than one non-FIFA nationality.

| No. | Pos. | Nation | Player |
|---|---|---|---|
| 1 | GK | USA | Haley Kopmeyer (on loan from Seattle Reign FC) |
| 3 | DF | AUS | Clare Hunt |
| 4 | DF | USA | Toni Pressley (on loan from Orlando Pride) |
| 5 | MF | AUS | Brianna Oliverio |
| 6 | MF | AUS | Caitlin Munoz |
| 7 | FW | AUS | Nickoletta Flannery |
| 8 | MF | AUS | Liana Danaskos |
| 10 | MF | AUS | Grace Maher |
| 11 | FW | NOR | Elise Thorsnes (on loan from Avaldsnes IL) |
| 12 | MF | AUS | Bethany Gordon |
| 14 | MF | AUS | Ashleigh Sykes (Co-Captain) |
| 15 | DF | AUS | Sarah Morgan |

| No. | Pos. | Nation | Player |
|---|---|---|---|
| 16 | MF | AUS | Karly Roestbakken |
| 17 | FW | AUS | Maddy Whittall |
| 18 | MF | AUS | Taren King |
| 19 | FW | AUS | Aoife Colvill |
| 20 | MF | AUS | Amy Sayer |
| 21 | DF | AUS | Ellie Carpenter |
| 22 | MF | AUS | Jasmine Maguire |
| 23 | FW | AUS | Michelle Heyman (Co-Captain) |
| 24 | DF | USA | Kendall Fletcher (Guest player) |
| 34 | DF | ENG | Laura Bassett |
| 35 | GK | AUS | Isobel Davy |
| 36 | MF | AUS | Georgia Boric |

=== Transfers in ===
| No. | Pos. | Nat. | Name | Age | Moving from | Type | Transfer window | Ends | Transfer fee | Source |
|---|---|---|---|---|---|---|---|---|---|---|
| | FW | (Australia) | Grace MacIntyre | | Newcastle Jets | Transfer | Pre-season | | Free | |
| 21 | DF | (Australia) | Ellie Carpenter | 17 | Western Sydney Wanderers | Transfer | Pre-season | | Free | |
| 1 | GK | (United States) | Haley Kopmeyer | 27 | (United States) Seattle Reign FC | Loan | Pre-season | | Free | |
| 34 | DF | (England) | Laura Bassett | 34 | Unattached | Transfer | Pre-season | | Free | |
| 8 | MF | (Australia) | Liana Danaskos | | Newcastle Jets | Transfer | Pre-season | | Free | |
| 5 | MF | (Australia) | Georgia Plessas | | (Australia) Sydney University | Transfer | Pre-season | | Free | |
| 20 | GK | (Australia) | Amy Sayer | | (Australia) Sydney University | Transfer | Pre-season | | Free | |
| 24 | DF | (United States) | Kendall Fletcher | 32 | Unattached | Guest player | Pre-season | | Free | |
| 4 | DF | (United States) | Toni Pressley | 27 | (United States) Orlando Pride | Loan | Pre-season | | Free | |
| 19 | MF | (Australia) | Aoife Colvill | | Canberra United Academy | Transfer | Pre-season | | Free | |
| 36 | MF | (Australia) | Bethany Gordon | | (Australia) Sydney University | Transfer | Pre-season | | Free | |
| 18 | MF | (Australia) | Taren King | | (Australia) Sydney University | Transfer | Pre-season | | Free | |
| 15 | DF | (Australia) | Sarah Morgon | | Canberra United Academy | Transfer | Pre=season | | Free | |
| 6 | MF | (Australia) | Caitlin Munoz | 34 | Unattached | Transfer | Pre-season | | Free | |
| 17 | FW | (Australia) | Maddy Whittall | | (Australia) Belconnen United | Transfer | Pre-season | | Free | |

=== Transfers out ===
| No. | Pos. | Nat. | Name | Age | Moving to | Type | Transfer window | Transfer fee | Source |
|---|---|---|---|---|---|---|---|---|---|
| 1 | GK | (Australia) | Trudy Burke | 26 | Western Sydney Wanderers | Transfer | Pre-season | Free | |
| 7 | DF | (Australia) | Ellie Brush | 29 | Western Sydney Wanderers | Transfer | Pre-season | Free | |
| 18 | MF | (Australia) | Kahlia Hogg | 23 | Western Sydney Wanderers | Transfer | Pre-season | Free | |
| 12 | DF | (Australia) | Hannah Brewer | 24 | Newcastle Jets | Transfer | Pre-season | Free | |
| 2 | DF | (Japan) | Yukari Kinga | 33 | Melbourne City | Transfer | Pre-season | Free | |
| 19 | FW | (Australia) | Aoife Colvill | 16 | Canberra United Academy | Transfer | Pre-season | Free | |
| 15 | DF | (Australia) | Sarah Morgan | 16 | Canberra United Academy | Transfer | Pre-season | Free | |
| 9 | FW | (United States) | Jasmyne Spencer | 27 | (United States) Orlando Pride | Loan return | Pre-season | Free | |
| 22 | DF | (United States) | Stephanie Ochs | 27 | (United States) Houston Dash | Loan return | Pre-season | Free | |
| 14 | MF | (Australia) | Ashleigh Sykes | 26 | Retired | Retired | End-season | Free | |

=== Contract extensions ===
| No. | Name | Position | Duration | Date | Notes |

== Managerial staff ==
Current as of 30 January 2017

| Position | Name |
|---|---|
| Chairperson | (Australia) Kate Lundy |
| Chief executive officer | (Australia) Phil Brown |
| Head coach | (Australia) Heather Garriock |
| Assistant coach | (Australia) Njegosh Popovich |
| Physiotherapist | (Australia) Julian Russell-Jones |
| Team doctor | (Australia) Dr. Wilson Lo |
| Team manager | (Australia) Antoni Jagarinec |

== Squad statistics ==
| N | Pos. | Nat. | Name | Total | | | | | W-League |
| N | Pos. | Nat. | Name | Apps | Goals | Yellow card | Second yellow card | Red card | Apps | Goals | Yellow card | Second yellow card | Red card |
|---|---|---|---|---|---|---|---|---|---|---|---|---|---|
| 1 | GK | (United States) | Haley Kopmeyer | 12 | 0 | 0 | 0 | 0 | 12+0 | 0 | 0 | 0 | 0 |
| 3 | DF | (Australia) | Clare Hunt | 7 | 0 | 1 | 0 | 0 | 6+1 | 0 | 1 | 0 | 0 |
| 4 | DF | (United States) | Toni Pressley | 12 | 2 | 0 | 0 | 0 | 12+0 | 2 | 0 | 0 | 0 |
| 5 | MF | (Australia) | Brianna Oliverio | 3 | 0 | 0 | 0 | 0 | 2+1 | 0 | 0 | 0 | 0 |
| 6 | MF | (Australia) | Caitlin Munoz | 7 | 0 | 1 | 0 | 0 | 2+5 | 0 | 1 | 0 | 0 |
| 7 | FW | (Australia) | Nickoletta Flannery | 5 | 0 | 0 | 0 | 0 | 2+3 | 0 | 0 | 0 | 0 |
| 8 | MF | (Australia) | Liana Danaskos | 10 | 0 | 1 | 0 | 0 | 4+6 | 0 | 1 | 0 | 0 |
| 10 | MF | (Australia) | Grace Maher | 11 | 2 | 0 | 0 | 0 | 8+3 | 2 | 0 | 0 | 0 |
| 11 | FW | (Norway) | Elise Thorsnes | 9 | 6 | 1 | 0 | 0 | 9+0 | 6 | 1 | 0 | 0 |
| 12 | GK | (Australia) | Bethany Gordon | 2 | 0 | 0 | 0 | 0 | 1+1 | 0 | 0 | 0 | 0 |
| 13 | DF | (Australia) | Lauren Keir | 0 | 0 | 0 | 0 | 0 | 0+0 | 0 | 0 | 0 | 0 |
| 14 | MF | (Australia) | Ashleigh Sykes | 10 | 4 | 0 | 0 | 0 | 10+0 | 4 | 0 | 0 | 0 |
| 15 | DF | (Australia) | Sarah Morgan | 1 | 0 | 0 | 0 | 0 | 1+0 | 0 | 0 | 0 | 0 |
| 16 | MF | (Australia) | Karly Roestbakken | 10 | 1 | 1 | 0 | 0 | 8+2 | 1 | 1 | 0 | 0 |
| 17 | FW | (Australia) | Maddy Whittall | 7 | 0 | 1 | 0 | 0 | 3+4 | 0 | 1 | 0 | 0 |
| 18 | MF | (Australia) | Taren King | 8 | 0 | 1 | 0 | 0 | 7+1 | 0 | 1 | 0 | 0 |
| 19 | FW | (Australia) | Aofie Colvill | 6 | 0 | 1 | 0 | 0 | 3+3 | 0 | 1 | 0 | 0 |
| 20 | MF | (Australia) | Amy Sayer | 10 | 1 | 1 | 0 | 0 | 7+3 | 1 | 1 | 0 | 0 |
| 21 | DF | (Australia) | Ellie Carpenter | 10 | 2 | 2 | 0 | 0 | 10+0 | 2 | 2 | 0 | 0 |
| 22 | MF | (Australia) | Jasmine Maguire | 0 | 0 | 0 | 0 | 0 | 0+0 | 0 | 0 | 0 | 0 |
| 23 | FW | (Australia) | Michelle Heyman | 11 | 5 | 0 | 0 | 0 | 11+0 | 5 | 0 | 0 | 0 |
| 24 | DF | (United States) | Kendall Fletcher | 2 | 0 | 0 | 0 | 0 | 2+0 | 0 | 0 | 0 | 0 |
| 34 | DF | (England) | Laura Bassett | 0 | 0 | 0 | 0 | 0 | 0+0 | 0 | 0 | 0 | 0 |
| 35 | GK | (Australia) | Isobel Davy | 0 | 0 | 0 | 0 | 0 | 0+0 | 0 | 0 | 0 | 0 |
| 36 | MF | (Australia) | Georgia Boric | 0 | 0 | 0 | 0 | 0 | 0+0 | 0 | 0 | 0 | 0 |
Players no longer at the club:
| 5 | MF | (Australia) | Georgia Plessas | 0 | 0 | 0 | 0 | 0 | 0+0 | 0 | 0 | 0 | 0 |

- Source: au.women.soccerway.com
- (yellow card) = Number of bookings; (second yellow card) = Number of sending offs after a second yellow card; (red card) = Number of sending offs by a direct red card.

== Competitions ==
=== W-League ===
==== League table ====
| Pos | Team | Pld | W | D | L | GF | GA | GD | Pts | Qualification |
|---|---|---|---|---|---|---|---|---|---|---|
| 1 | Brisbane Roar | 12 | 9 | 1 | 2 | 21 | 12 | +9 | 28 | Qualification to Finals series |
| 2 | Sydney FC | 12 | 8 | 1 | 3 | 26 | 16 | +10 | 25 | Qualification to Finals series |
| 3 | Newcastle Jets | 12 | 6 | 2 | 4 | 26 | 21 | +5 | 20 | Qualification to Finals series |
| 4 | Melbourne City (C) | 12 | 6 | 2 | 4 | 20 | 15 | +5 | 20 | Qualification to Finals series |
| 5 | Canberra United | 12 | 5 | 1 | 6 | 24 | 27 | −3 | 16 | |
| 6 | Perth Glory | 12 | 4 | 2 | 6 | 25 | 27 | −2 | 14 | |
| 7 | Melbourne Victory | 12 | 3 | 2 | 7 | 15 | 19 | −4 | 11 | |
| 8 | Western Sydney Wanderers | 12 | 3 | 2 | 7 | 13 | 21 | −8 | 11 | |
| 9 | Adelaide United | 12 | 3 | 1 | 8 | 15 | 27 | −12 | 10 | |

Source: A-Leagues
Rules for classification: 1) points; 2) goal difference; 3) number of goals scored.
(C) Champions

==== Results summary ====
| Overall | | | | | | | | Home | | | | | | Away | | | | | |
| Pld | W | D | L | GF | GA | GD | Pts | W | D | L | GF | GA | GD | W | D | L | GF | GA | GD |
|---|---|---|---|---|---|---|---|---|---|---|---|---|---|---|---|---|---|---|---|
| 12 | 5 | 1 | 6 | 24 | 27 | −3 | 16 | 4 | 0 | 2 | 15 | 11 | +4 | 1 | 1 | 4 | 9 | 16 | −7 |

Source: Competitive Matches

==== Results by round ====
| Round | 1 | 2 | 3 | 4 | 5 | 6 | 7 | 8 | 9 | 10 | 11 | 12 | 13 | 14 |
|---|---|---|---|---|---|---|---|---|---|---|---|---|---|---|
| Ground | A | B | H | A | H | H | H | A | B | H | H | A | H | A |
| Result | L | ✖ | W | W | W | L | L | L | ✖ | W | W | D | L | L |
| Position | 6 | 7 | 6 | 3 | 2 | 3 | 6 | 6 | 6 | 6 | 5 | 5 | 5 | 5 |

Source: Competitive Matches
A = Away; H = Home; B = Bye; W = Win; D = Draw; L = Loss

==== Matches ====
Win Draw Loss

| 28 October 2017 1 | Melbourne Victory | 2–1 | Canberra United | Melbourne |
| 16:30 AEDT | McNabb 6'; Dowie 63' | Report | Heyman 25' | Stadium: Epping Stadium; Attendance: 500; Referee: Rebecca Durcau |

| 12 November 2017 3 | Canberra United | 3–2 | Sydney FC | Canberra |
| 16:30 AEDT | Heyman 13', 85'; Pressley 78' | Report | Cooper 45+2' (pen.); Ledbrook 70' (pen.) | Stadium: McKellar Park; Attendance: 1,003; Referee: Casey Reibelt |

| 19 November 2017 4 | Newcastle Jets | 1–2 | Canberra United | Newcastle |
| 16:30 AEDT | van Egmond 8' (pen.) | Report | Sykes 48'; Pressley 65' | Stadium: No. 2 Sportsground; Attendance: 1,030; Referee: Maddison Kennedy |

| 25 November 2017 5 | Canberra United | 3–2 | Perth Glory | Canberra |
| 16:00 AEDT | Maher 18'; Sayer 57'; Bassett 70' | Report | Hill 45'; Moreno 87' | Stadium: McKellar Park; Attendance: 1,004; Referee: Rachel Mitchenson |

| 3 December 2017 6 | Canberra United | 0–1 | Brisbane Roar | Canberra |
| 16:30 AEDT | | Report | Butt 67' | Stadium: McKellar Park; Attendance: 1,126; Referee: Katie Patterson |

| 10 December 2017 7 | Melbourne City | 2–1 | Canberra United | Melbourne |
| 16:30 AEDT | Fishlock 20', 80' | Report | Heyman 23' | Stadium: AAMI Park; Attendance: 2,504; Referee: Rebecca Durcau |

| 15 December 2017 8 | Sydney FC | 3–0 | Canberra United | Sydney |
| 17:20 AEDT | De Vanna 30', 42'; Pressley 48' (o.g.) | Report | | Stadium: Allianz Stadium; Attendance: 2,958; Referee: Casey Reibelt |

| 7 January 2018 10 | Canberra United | 6–1 | Adelaide United | Canberra |
| 18:30 AEDT | Carpenter 4'; Thorsnes 38', 47', 53'; Sykes 44'; Roestbakken 52' | Report | Mautz 11' | Stadium: McKellar Park; Attendance: 1,050; Referee: Kate Jacewicz |

| 14 January 2018 11 | Canberra United | 2–0 | Western Sydney Wanderers | Canberra |
| 16:30 AEDT | Heyman 76'; Thorsnes 77' | Report | | Stadium: McKellar Park; Attendance: 1,464; Referee: Casey Reibelt |

| 20 January 2018 12 | Perth Glory | 4–4 | Canberra United | Bunbury |
| 16:30 AWST | Kerr 13', 16', 43'; Hill 22' | Report | Sykes 24', 34'; Maher 45+3'; Thorsnes 62' | Stadium: Hay Park; Attendance: 1,369; Referee: Katie Patterson |

| 28 January 2018 13 | Canberra United | 1–5 | Newcastle Jets | Canberra |
| 16:30 AEDT | Carpenter 42' | Report | van Egmond 13', 66'; Stengel 23', 82', 90' | Stadium: McKellar Park; Attendance: 1,117; Referee: Rebecca Durcau |

| 4 February 2018 14 | Brisbane Roar | 4–1 | Canberra United | Brisbane |
| 15:30 AEST | Raso 11'; Gielnik 40'; Lloyd 72', 90' | Report | Thorsnes 74' | Stadium: Suncorp Stadium; Attendance: 4,225; Referee: Lara Lee |
