= Elise Kellond-Knight =

Australian association footballer (born 1990)

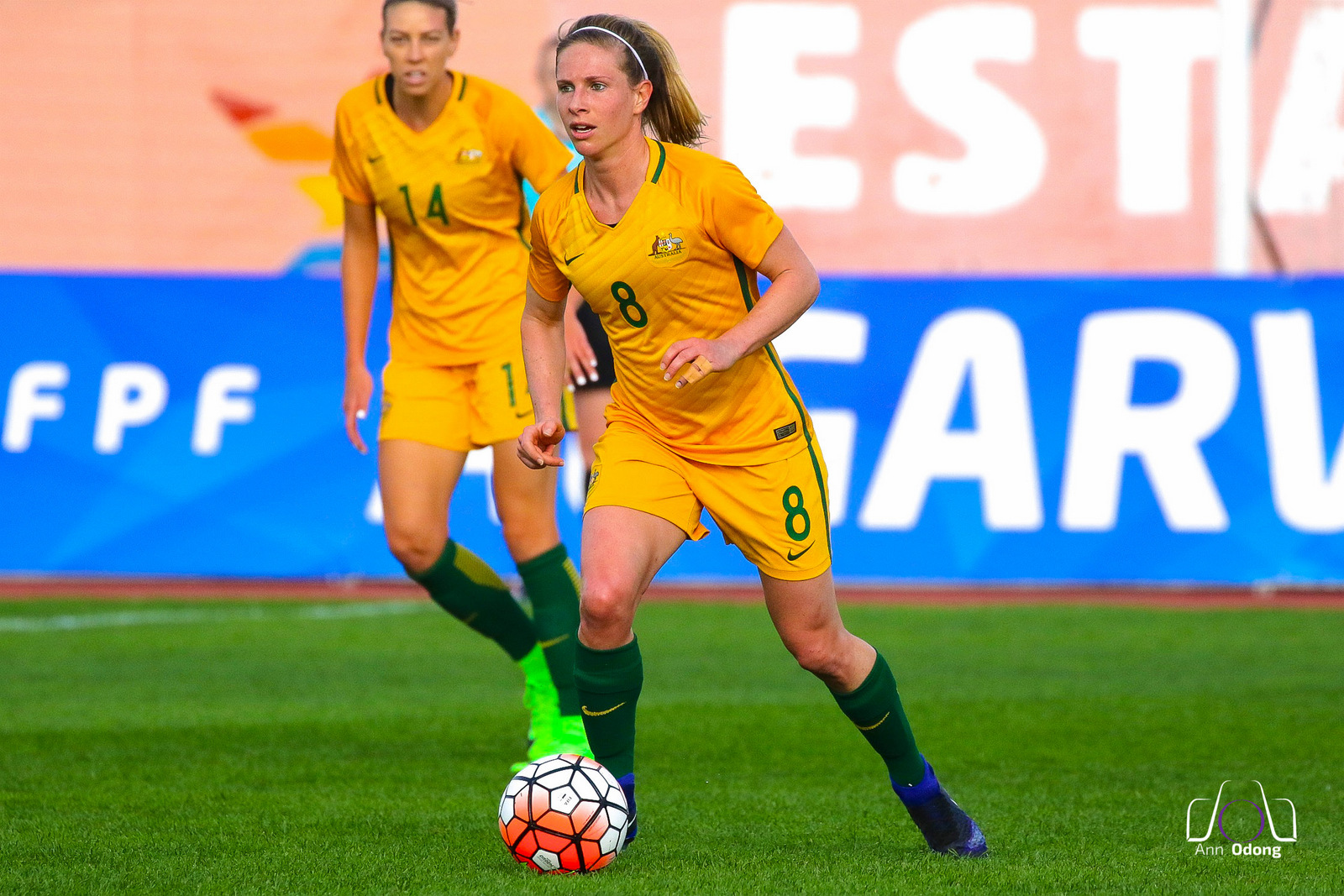
- Kellond-Knight playing for the Australia at the 2017 Algarve Cup

Personal information
- Full name: Elise Kellond-Knight
- Date of birth: 10 August 1990 (age 36)
- Place of birth: Gold Coast, Queensland, Australia
- Height: 1.65 m (5 ft 5 in)
- Positions: Defensive midfielder; defender

Senior career*
Years	Team	Apps	(Gls)
2008–2015	Brisbane Roar	68	(8)
2011–2012	→ Fortuna Hjørring (loan)		
2014	→ Iga F.C. Kunoichi (loan)		
2015–2017	1. FFC Turbine Potsdam	50	(4)
2018	Hammarby	20	(0)
2018–2019	Melbourne City	11	(2)
2019	Reign FC	3	(0)
2019	Washington Spirit	6	(0)
2019–2020	Brisbane Roar	7	(0)
2020	Kristianstads	2	(0)
2021–2022	Hammarby	12	(0)
2022–2024	Melbourne Victory	29	(0)
2024	Avondale FC	0	(0)

International career^{‡}
2007–2009	Australia U-20	13	(0)
2007–2023	Australia	115	(2)
- * Club domestic league appearances and goals as of 27 May 2024 ‡ National team caps and goals as of 22 February 2023

Elise Kellond-Knight (born 10 August 1990) is an Australian former soccer player, who played as a defensive midfielder or defender. From 2007 to 2023 she played 115 games for Australia women's national soccer team, before retiring from international football in 2024. Kellond-Knight is a left footed set piece specialist.

== Early life ==
Kellond-Knight was born on 10 August 1990, and raised on the Gold Coast where she attended Coombabah State School (primary) and then St Hilda's School (secondary). She played junior football for Runaway Bay in the local Gold Coast competition. Kellond-Knight graduated from Griffith University with a Master of Business Administration in December 2023, after previously completing a Bachelor of Pharmaceutical Science at the same university.

== Club career ==
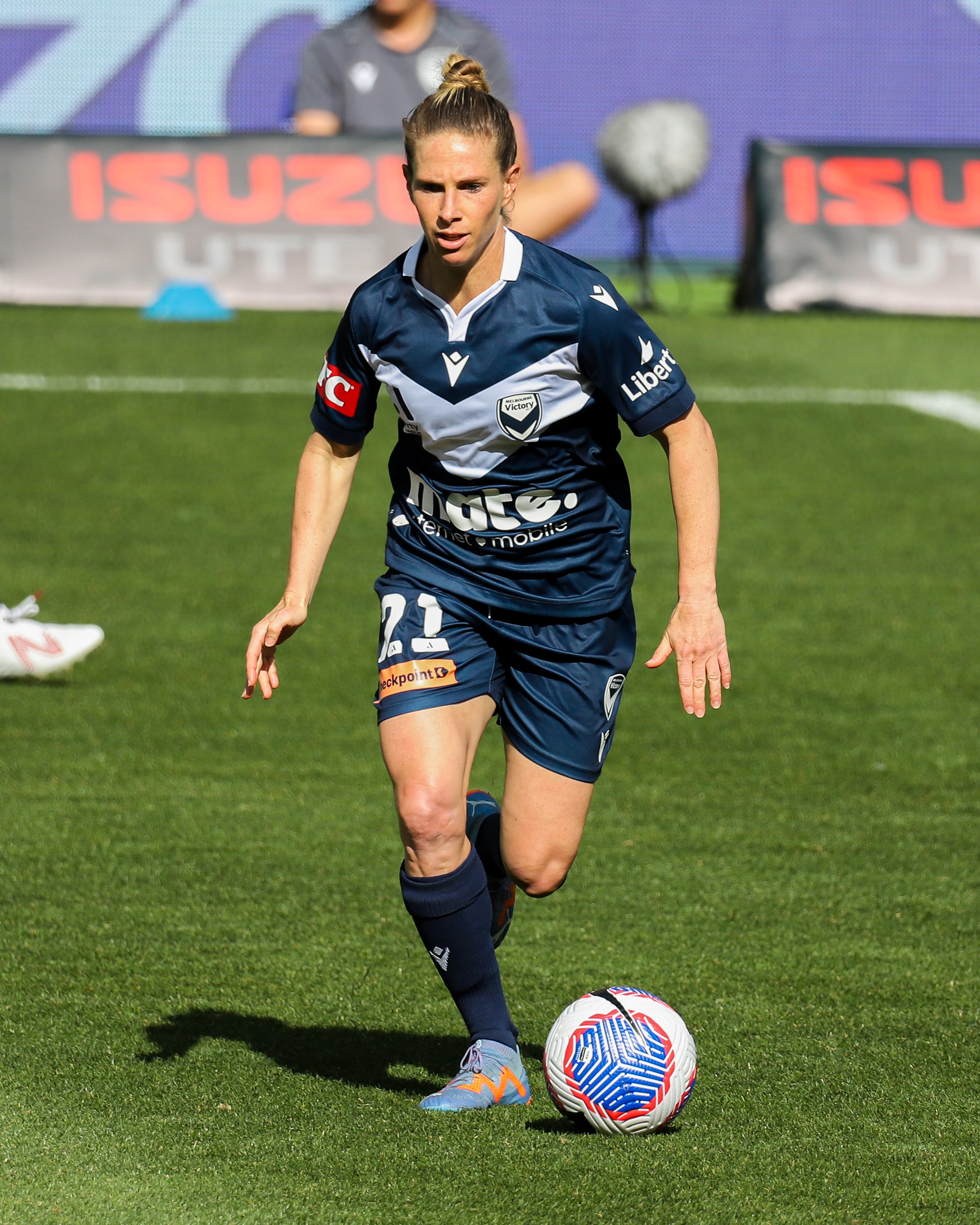
Elise Kellond-Knight playing for Melbourne Victory, December 2023

At the annual Westfield W-League awards dinner in 2009, Kellond-Knight was jointly awarded the Young Player of the Year Award with Canberra United's Ellyse Perry.

After leaving 1. FFC Turbine Potsdam at the end of 2017, Kellond-Knight was hoping to join the Reign FC in the NWSL, however a discovery claim by the North Carolina Courage prevented her from joining the Reign. In April 2018, she signed a short-term deal with Hammarby in the Damallsvenskan. In June she extended her contract through the end of the season.

Kellond-Knight signed with Melbourne City for the 2018–19 W-League season. Reign FC announced on September 24, 2018, that Kellond-Knight had signed with them for the 2019 NWSL season.

On July 15, 2019, Kellond-Knight was traded to Washington Spirit in exchange for Sammy Jo Prudhomme. On October 26, 2019, Kellond-Knight returned to Brisbane Roar. In July 2020 the footballer ruptured her anterior cruciate ligament (ACL), which took over two years of recovery. She rejoined Hammarby in August 2022.

In November 2022, Kellond-Knight returned to Australia, joining reigning champions Melbourne Victory. An Achilles tendon injury during training resulted in her missing the 2023 season. In September 2024, Kellond-Knight joined newly promoted National Premier Leagues Victoria Women's club Avondale FC. A fortnight later, she announced her retirement from professional football.

== International career ==
For Kellond-Knight's performances at the 2011 FIFA Women's World Cup and 2015 FIFA Women's World Cup, she was named as part of the All Star Team for both tournaments.

During a match against Brazil at the 2016 Summer Olympics, a moment of Kellond-Knight and her teammate Lisa De Vanna went viral when during a short break, De Vanna absent-mindedly tried to drink from the wrong end of a water bottle, prompting Kellond-Knight to quickly flip it in her hand.

On 9 October 2018, Kellond-Knight earned her 100th cap for Australia in a friendly against England, which ended in a 1–1 draw.

At the 2019 FIFA Women's World Cup, she scored a goal directly from a corner kick in the Round of 16 match against Norway.

Kellond-Knight was included in the squad for the 2020 Summer Olympics. The Matildas advanced to the quarter-finals with one victory and one draw during group play. In the quarter-finals they beat Great Britain 4–3 after extra time. However, they lost 1–0 to Sweden in the semi-final and were then beaten 4–3 in the bronze medal match by the United States. After her ACL injury, she returned to the Matildas squad in December 2022. Kellond-Knight participated in the 2023 Cup of Nations in February of that year, in which Australia won all three games and took the title for the second time. Due to an Achilles injury, the defensive midfielder was unavailable for the 2023 FIFA Women's World Cup held in Australia and New Zealand during July–August. She subsequently retired from international football.

== Career statistics ==
=== International goals ===
Key (expand for notes on "international goals" and sorting)
Location	Geographic location of the venue where the competition occurred Sorted by country name first, then by city name
Lineup	Start – played entire match on minute (off player) – substituted on at the minute indicated, and player was substituted off at the same time off minute (on player) – substituted off at the minute indicated, and player was substituted on at the same time (c) – captain Sorted by minutes played
Min	The minute in the match the goal was scored. For list that include caps, blank indicates played in the match but did not score a goal.
Assist/pass	The ball was passed by the player, which assisted in scoring the goal. This column depends on the availability and source of this information.
penalty or pk	Goal scored on penalty-kick which was awarded due to foul by opponent. (Goals scored in penalty-shoot-out, at the end of a tied match after extra-time, are not included.)
Score	The match score after the goal was scored. Sorted by goal difference, then by goal scored by the player's team
Result	The final score. Sorted by goal difference in the match, then by goal difference in penalty-shoot-out if it is taken, followed by goal scored by the player's team in the match, then by goal scored in the penalty-shoot-out. For matches with identical final scores, match ending in extra-time without penalty-shoot-out is a tougher match, therefore precede matches that ended in regulation
aet	The score at the end of extra-time; the match was tied at the end of 90' regulation
pso	Penalty-shoot-out score shown in parentheses; the match was tied at the end of extra-time
	Yellow background color – match at an invitational tournament
	Red background color – Olympic women's football qualification match
NOTE: some keys may not apply for a particular football player

Goal	Date	Location	Opponent	Score	Result	Competition
1.	22 May 2014	Thống Nhất Stadium, Ho Chi Minh City, Vietnam	South Korea	2–1	2–1	2014 AFC Women's Asian Cup
2.	22 June 2019	Allianz Riviera, Nice, France	Norway	1–1	1–1	2019 FIFA Women's World Cup

== Honours ==
=== Club ===
Brisbane Roar

- W-League Championship: 2008–09, 2010–11
- W-League Premiership: 2008–09

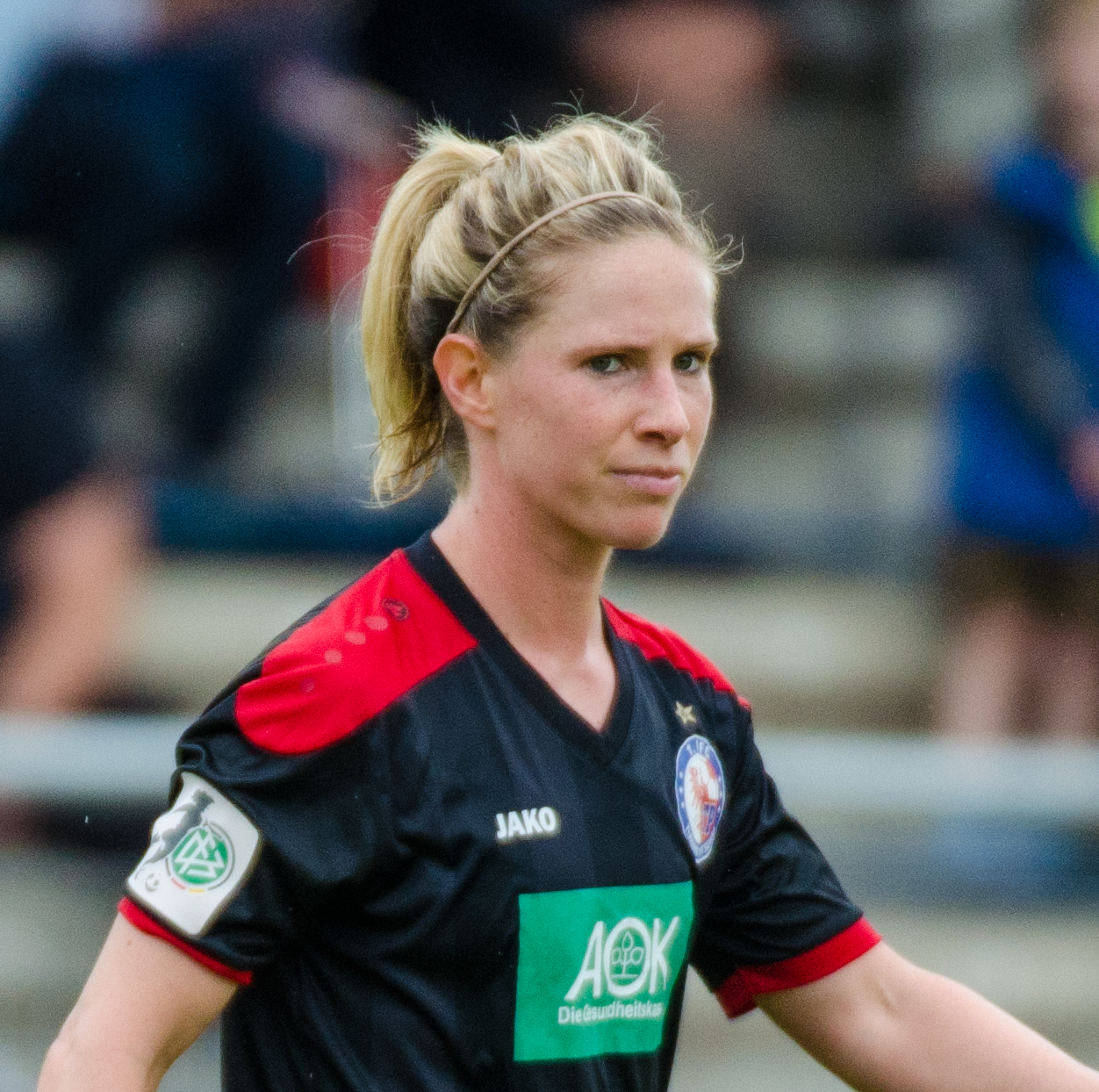
Kellond-Knight playing for Turbine Potsdam in 2015

=== International ===
Australia

- AFC Women's Asian Cup: 2010
- AFF Women's Championship: 2008
- AFC Olympic Qualifying Tournament: 2016
- Tournament of Nations: 2017
- FFA Cup of Nations: 2019

=== Individual ===
- W-League Young Player of the Year: 2009
- FIFA Women's World Cup All-Star Team: 2011, 2015
- FFA Female Footballer of the Year: 2011

== See also ==
- List of women's footballers with 100 or more caps
