= 2018–19 Canberra United FC (women) season =

Canberra United FC
2018–19 season
- Manager: Heather Garriock
- Stadium: McKellar Park, Seiffert Oval
- W-League: 8th
- Top goalscorer: Rhoda Mulaudzi (4 goals)
Home colours	Away colours

The 2018–19 Canberra United FC season was the club's eleventh season in the W-League, the premier competition for women's soccer in Australia. The team played home games at McKellar Park and Seiffert Oval. The club's manager for the season was Heather Garriock.

== Players ==
=== Squad information ===
As of 23 November 2018

Note: Flags indicate national team as defined under FIFA eligibility rules; some limited exceptions apply. Players may hold more than one non-FIFA nationality.

No.	Pos.	Nation	Player
1	GK	AUS	Melissa Maizels
2	MF	AUS	Laura Hughes
3	DF	AUS	Natasha Prior
4	DF	SCO	Rachel Corsie (captain)
5	MF	AUS	Nikola Orgill
6	MF	RSA	Refiloe Jane
7	FW	AUS	Aoife Colvill
8	MF	AUS	Olivia Price
9	MF	RSA	Rhoda Mulaudzi
12	DF	AUS	Lauren Keir

No.	Pos.	Nation	Player
13	MF	AUS	Meaghan McElligott
15	MF	AUS	Rosaria Galea
16	MF	AUS	Karly Roestbakken
17	FW	AUS	Maddy Whittall
18	DF	AUS	Taren King
19	FW	AUS	Nickoletta Flannery
20	GK	AUS	Sham Khamis
21	DF	AUS	Ellie Carpenter
23	FW	CHI	María José Rojas

=== Transfers in ===
No.	Pos.	Nat.	Name	Age	Moving from	Type	Transfer window	Ends	Transfer fee	Source
5	MF	(Australia)	Nikola Orgill	25	Newcastle Jets	Transfer	Pre-season			
6	MF	(South Africa)	Refiloe Jane	26	(South Africa) Vaal University of Technology	Transfer	Pre-season			
3	DF	(Australia)	Natasha Prior	20	Newcastle Jets	Transfer	Pre-season			
9	MF	(South Africa)	Rhoda Mulaudzi	28	(South Africa) Mamelodi Sundowns	Transfer	Pre-season			
1	GK	(Australia)	Melissa Maizels	25	Perth Glory	Transfer	Pre-season			
20	GK	(Australia)	Shamiran Khamis	23	Sydney FC	Transfer	Pre-season			
13	MF	(Australia)	Meaghan McElligott		(Australia) Moreton Bay Jets (NPLW)	Signed	Pre-season			
4	DF	(Scotland)	Rachel Corsie	29	(United States) Utah Royals FC	Loan	Pre-season			
11	MF	(Republic of Ireland)	Denise O'Sullivan	24	(United States) North Carolina Courage	Loan	Pre-season			
8	MF	(Australia)	Olivia Price	22	Western Sydney Wanderers	Transfer	Pre-season			
23	FW	(Chile)	María José Rojas	30	(Japan) Orca Kamogawa FC	Transfer	Pre-season			
10	FW	(United States)	Paige Nielsen	25	(South Korea) Suwon UDC WFC	Transfer	Mid-season			
23	FW	(Chile)	María José Rojas	30		Transfer	Mid-season			

=== Transfers out ===
No.	Pos.	Nat.	Name	Age	Moving to	Type	Transfer window	Transfer fee	Source
1	GK	(United States)	Hayley Kopmeyer	28	(United States) Orlando Pride	Loan Return	Pre-season		
4	DF	(United States)	Toni Pressley	28	(United States) Orlando Pride	Loan Return	Pre-season		
11	FW	(Norway)	Elise Thorsnes	30	(United States) Utah Royals FC	Transfer	Pre-season		
23	FW	(Australia)	Michelle Heyman	30	Adelaide United	Transfer	Pre-season		
20	FW	(Australia)	Amy Sayer	16	Sydney FC	Transfer	Pre-season		
10	MF	(Australia)	Grace Maher	19	Melbourne Victory	Transfer	Pre-season		
8	MF	(Australia)	Liana Danaskos	23	Western Sydney Wanderers	Transfer	Pre-season		
23	FW	(Chile)	María José Rojas	30	Unattached	Waived	Mid-season		
10	FW	(United States)	Paige Nielsen	25	Unattached		Mid-season		
11	MF	(Republic of Ireland)	Denise O'Sullivan	24	(United States) North Carolina Courage	Loan return	Mid-season		

== Pre-season and friendlies ==
13 December 2018	Canberra United (Australia)	0–2	China	Brisbane
17:00 AEST		Report		Stadium: Perry Park; Attendance: 0 (behind closed doors)

== W-League ==
=== League table ===
Pos	Team	Pld	W	D	L	GF	GA	GD	Pts	Qualification
1	Melbourne Victory	12	7	3	2	21	15	+6	24	Qualification to Finals series and 2019 AFC Women's Club Championship
2	Brisbane Roar	12	6	2	4	18	17	+1	20	Qualification to Finals series
3	Sydney FC (C)	12	6	1	5	28	19	+9	19	Qualification to Finals series
4	Perth Glory	12	5	4	3	28	20	+8	19	Qualification to Finals series
5	Melbourne City	12	6	1	5	20	15	+5	19	
6	Adelaide United	12	5	3	4	17	19	−2	18	
7	Newcastle Jets	12	5	1	6	18	21	−3	16	
8	Canberra United	12	3	4	5	13	18	−5	13	
9	Western Sydney Wanderers	12	1	1	10	11	30	−19	4	

Source: A-Leagues
Rules for classification: 1) points; 2) goal difference; 3) number of goals scored.
(C) Champions

=== Matches ===
Win Draw Loss

28 October 2018 1	Canberra United	2–0	Melbourne City	Canberra
	Mulaudzi 57'; Carpenter 85'	Report		Stadium: McKellar Park; Attendance: 1,679; Referee: Katie Patterson

4 November 2018 2	Canberra United	4–4	Perth Glory	Canberra
	Jane 7' (pen.), 77' (pen.); Mulaudzi 30'; Rojas 45+1'	Report	O'Sullivan 5' (o.g.); Mautz 82'; Mackenna 87'; Corsie 90' (o.g.)	Stadium: McKellar Park; Attendance: 1,742; Referee: Lara Lee

17 November 2018 3	Newcastle Jets	1–0	Canberra United	Newcastle
	Vine 45+2'	Report		Stadium: McDonald Jones Stadium; Attendance: 1,343; Referee: Rebecca Durcau

22 November 2018 4	Adelaide United	2–0	Canberra United	Adelaide
	Latsko 27'; Prior 86' (o.g.)	Report		Stadium: Coopers Stadium; Attendance: 1,029; Referee: Kate Jacewicz

2 December 2018 5	Canberra United	2–0	Sydney FC	Canberra
	Mulaudzi 45+4'; Roestbakken 60'	Report		Stadium: McKellar Park; Attendance: 1,537; Referee: Katie Patterson

7 December 2018 6	Western Sydney Wanderers	2–2	Canberra United	Sydney
	Khamis 65'; Ledbrook 87'	Report	Carpenter 52'; Uzunlar 85' (o.g.)	Stadium: Spotless Stadium; Attendance: 1,321; Referee: Rachel Mitchenson

22 December 2018 8	Melbourne City	3–0	Canberra United	Melbourne
	Dobson 8', 45+2'; Simon 36'	Report		Stadium: AAMI Park; Attendance: 3,830; Referee: Rebecca Durcau

27 December 2018 9	Canberra United	1–1	Brisbane Roar	Canberra
	Mulaudzi 3'	Report	Toby 38'	Stadium: McKellar Park; Attendance: 1,358; Referee: Katie Patterson

3 January 2019 10	Perth Glory	1–0	Canberra United	Perth
	Kerr 85' (pen.)	Report		Stadium: Dorrien Gardens; Attendance: 838; Referee: Casey Reibelt

13 January 2019 11	Canberra United	1–0	Adelaide United	Canberra
	Carpenter 59'	Report		Stadium: McKellar Park; Attendance: 1,486; Referee: Rachel Mitchenson

25 January 2019 13	Brisbane Roar	4–1	Canberra United	Brisbane
	Raso 19'; Boureille 32'; Nagasato 70'; Toby 73'	Report	Flannery 62'	Stadium: Suncorp Stadium; Attendance: 2,589; Referee: Kate Jacewicz

5 February 2019 12	Canberra United	0–0	Melbourne Victory	Queanbeyan
		Postponement; Rescheduling		Stadium: Seiffert Oval

=== Results summary ===
Overall								Home						Away					
Pld	W	D	L	GF	GA	GD	Pts	W	D	L	GF	GA	GD	W	D	L	GF	GA	GD
12	3	4	5	13	18	−5	13	3	3	0	10	5	+5	0	1	5	3	13	−10

Last updated: 5 February 2019.
Source: Competitive Matches

=== Results by round ===
Round	1	2	3	4	5	6	7	8	9	10	11	12	13	14
Ground	H	H	A	A	H	A	B	A	H	A	H	H	A	B
Result	W	D	L	L	W	D	✖	L	D	L	W	L	D	✖
Position	2	1	3	6	4	4	6	7	7	7	7	7	7	7

Updated to match(es) played on 5 February 2019. Source: Competitive Matches
A = Away; H = Home; B = Bye; W = Win; D = Draw; L = Loss
