= Clare Polkinghorne =

Australian soccer player (born 1989)

Clare Polkinghorne OAM
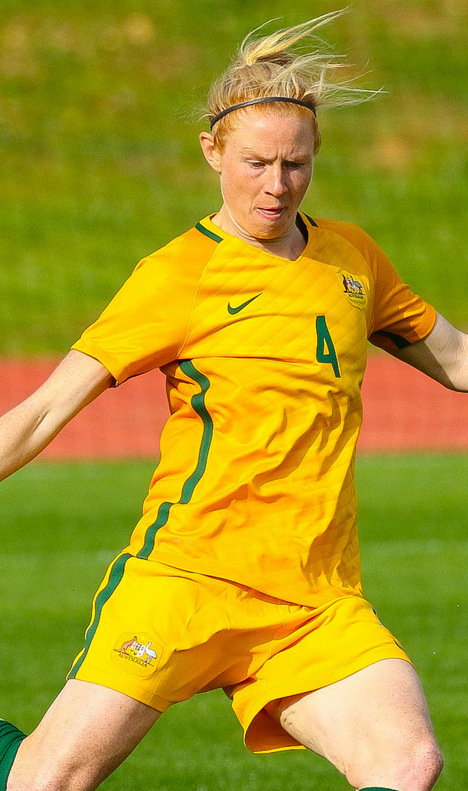
- Polkinghorne playing for Australia at the 2017 Algarve Cup

Personal information
- Full name: Clare Elizabeth Polkinghorne
- Date of birth: 1 February 1989 (age 37)
- Place of birth: Brisbane, Queensland, Australia
- Height: 1.71 m (5 ft 7 in)
- Position: Defender

Youth career
- Wynnum Wolves
- Capalaba Bulldogs

Senior career*
Years	Team	Apps	(Gls)
2003	Brisbane Toro		
2004	Queensland Lions		
2004–2008	Queensland Academy of Sport		
2008–2021	Brisbane Roar	139	(17)
2014	→ INAC Kobe Leonessa (loan)		
2015	Portland Thorns	9	(0)
2018–2019	Houston Dash	18	(0)
2020	Avaldsnes IL	15	(1)
2021–2023	Vittsjö GIK	56	(7)
2024	Kristianstads DFF	26	(2)
Total		263	(27)

International career^{‡}
2006–2007	Australia U-20	14	(0)
2006–2024	Australia	169	(16)
- * Club domestic league appearances and goals as of 17 December 2024 ‡ National team caps and goals as of 17 December 2024

Clare Elizabeth Polkinghorne (born 1 February 1989) is an Australian professional soccer player who plays as a defender. On 2 October 2024 she announced her retirement from international football, and played her last game for the Matildas in a friendly against Chinese Taipei on 7 December 2024. She became Australia's most capped footballer in February 2023, and as of her final game, she extended this record with 169 appearances since her debut in 2006. She retired at Damallsvenskan club Kristianstads DFF. Polkinghorne was awarded the Medal of the Order of Australia in the 2025 Australia Day Honours for "service to football".

== Early life and education ==
Clare Elizabeth Polkinghorne was born on 1 February 1989 in Brisbane, Queensland.

== Club career ==
=== INAC Kobe Leonessa ===
For the 2014 season, Polkinghorne was loaned to INAC Kobe Leonessa in Japan.

=== Portland Thorns ===
Polkinghorne signed for Portland Thorns in the National Women's Soccer League after the 2015 World Cup. Portland Thorns waived Polkinghorne in February 2016.

=== Brisbane Roar ===
On 7 January 2017, Polkinghorne become the first player to play 100 club games in the W-League, all of which have been played for Brisbane Roar. In December 2020, Polkinghorne re-signed with Brisbane Roar after spending the off-season at Avaldsnes.

=== Houston Dash (2018–2019) ===
On 7 June 2018, Polkinghorne signed with the Houston Dash.

=== Vittsjö GIK (2021–2023) ===
Polkinghorne signed for Swedish Damallsvenskan club Vittsjö GIK on 19 March 2021.

=== Kristianstads DFF (2024–present) ===
On 25 December 2023, Polkinghorne joined Kristianstads DFF for the 2024 Damallsvenskan season.

== International career ==
Polkinghorne first represented the Australia national team in 2006 and has played more than 160 matches, scoring 16 goals. She played in both the 2007 World Cup and 2011 World Cup and was an unused squad member during the 2015 World Cup.

Polkinghorne was selected for the Australian Matildas football team which qualified for the Tokyo 2020 Olympics. The Matildas advanced to the quarter-finals with one victory and a draw in the group play. In the quarter-finals they beat Great Britain 4–3 after extra time. However, they lost 1–0 to Sweden in the semi-final and were then beaten 4–3 in the bronze medal playoff by USA.

In February 2023, Polkinghorne became the most capped Matilda ever with her 152nd appearance, after surpassing the previous record set by Cheryl Salisbury. She scored a goal against the Czech Republic in the game.

On 4 June 2024, Polkinghorne was named in the Matildas team which qualified for the Paris 2024 Olympics, her third Olympic games selection.

=== Retirement ===
Polkinghorne announced her retirement from international football on 2 October 2024, effective in December, after the Matildas play Brazil in her hometown of Brisbane. She will continue her club career at Kristianstads, at the same time working towards attaining a coaching licence.

Polkinghorne played her second last game for the Matildas in a friendly against Brazil at Lang Park in Brisbane on 28 November 2024, which they lost 3–1 (the goal scored by Caitlin Foord). Polkinghorne's last game for Australia occurred on 7 December, in a 6–0 win against Chinese Taipei held in Geelong. At this date, she is Australia's most capped footballer, with 169 appearances during her career. In the next month she was awarded the Medal of the Order of Australia in the Australia Day Honours for "service to football".

== Personal life ==
Polkinghorne is in a lesbian relationship with Swedish Hyrox coach Louise Persson. On 29 September 2025, Polkinghorne and Persson announced that they were expecting their first child.

=== Clare Polkinghorne Medal ===
On 23 December 2025, the A-League broadcast partner Network 10 announced that they would launch the Clare Polkinghorne Medal, the first of which to be awarded at the 2026 A-League Women Grand Final. The award mirrors the existing Alex Tobin Medal, where the winners are selected by the league's broadcaster. Points are awarded after each regular season game, with the best player on the pitch given three points, the second-best awarded two points, and third-best one point. At the end of the season, the points are tallied and the player with the most points overall is awarded the Clare Polkinghorne Medal. The winner receives a cash prize, and also nominates a junior club to also receive prizes from the league sponsors.

== Career statistics ==
=== International goals ===
Goal	Date	Location	Opponent	Score	Result	Competition
1.	5 March 2008	Stockland Park, Sunshine Coast, Australia	New Zealand	4–2	4–2	Friendly
2.	2 June 2008	Thống Nhất Stadium, Ho Chi Minh City, Vietnam	Japan	1–3	1–3	2008 AFC Women's Asian Cup
3.	16 June 2013	Australian Institute of Sport, Canberra, Australia	New Zealand	1–0	1–1	Friendly
4.	10 February 2015	Bill McKinlay Park, Auckland, New Zealand	North Korea	1–0	2–1	Friendly
5	11 March 2015	Paralimni Stadium, Paralimni, Cyprus	Czech Republic	5–2	6–2	2015 Cyprus Cup
6.	2 March 2016	Nagai Stadium, Osaka, Japan	Vietnam	9–0	9–0	2016 Olympics qualifying
7.	9 August 2016	Itaipava Arena Fonte Nova, Salvador, Brazil	Zimbabwe	2–0	6–1	2016 Summer Olympics
8.	28 February 2018	Albufeira Municipal Stadium, Albufeira, Portugal	Norway	1–1	4–3	2018 Algarve Cup
9.	9 October 2018	Craven Cottage, London, England	England	1–1	1–1	Friendly
10.	6 March 2020	McDonald Jones Stadium, Newcastle, Australia	Vietnam	4–0	5–0	2020 Olympics qualifying
11.	10 June 2021	CASA Arena, Horsens, Denmark	Denmark	2–3	2–3	Friendly
12.	23 October 2021	CommBank Stadium, Sydney, Australia	Brazil	1–0	3–1	Friendly
13.	26 October 2021	CommBank Stadium, Sydney, Australia	Brazil	1–0	2–2	Friendly
14.	8 October 2022	Kingsmeadow, London, United Kingdom	South Africa	3–0	4–1	Friendly
15.	16 February 2023	Industree Group Stadium, Gosford, Australia	Czech Republic	4–0	4–0	2023 Cup of Nations
16.	19 February 2023	CommBank Stadium, Sydney, Australia	Spain	2–0	3–2	2023 Cup of Nations

== Honours ==
Queensland Sting

- Women's National Soccer League: 2005

Brisbane Roar

- W-League Premiership: 2008–09, 2012–13
- W-League Championship: 2008–09, 2010–11

Australia

- AFF Women's Championship: 2008
- AFC Women's Asian Cup: 2010
- AFC Olympic Qualifying Tournament: 2016
- Tournament of Nations: 2017
- FFA Cup of Nations: 2019

Individual

- 2012–13 Julie Dolan Medal: Best player in the 2012–13 W-League
- 2017–18 Julie Dolan Medal: Best player in the 2017–18 W-League (jointly with Sam Kerr)
- 2025 Medal of the Order of Australia in the Australia Day Honours for "service to football".

== See also ==
- Australia at the 2020 Summer Olympics
- List of women's footballers with 100 or more caps
