= Ellie Carpenter =

Australian soccer player (born 2000)

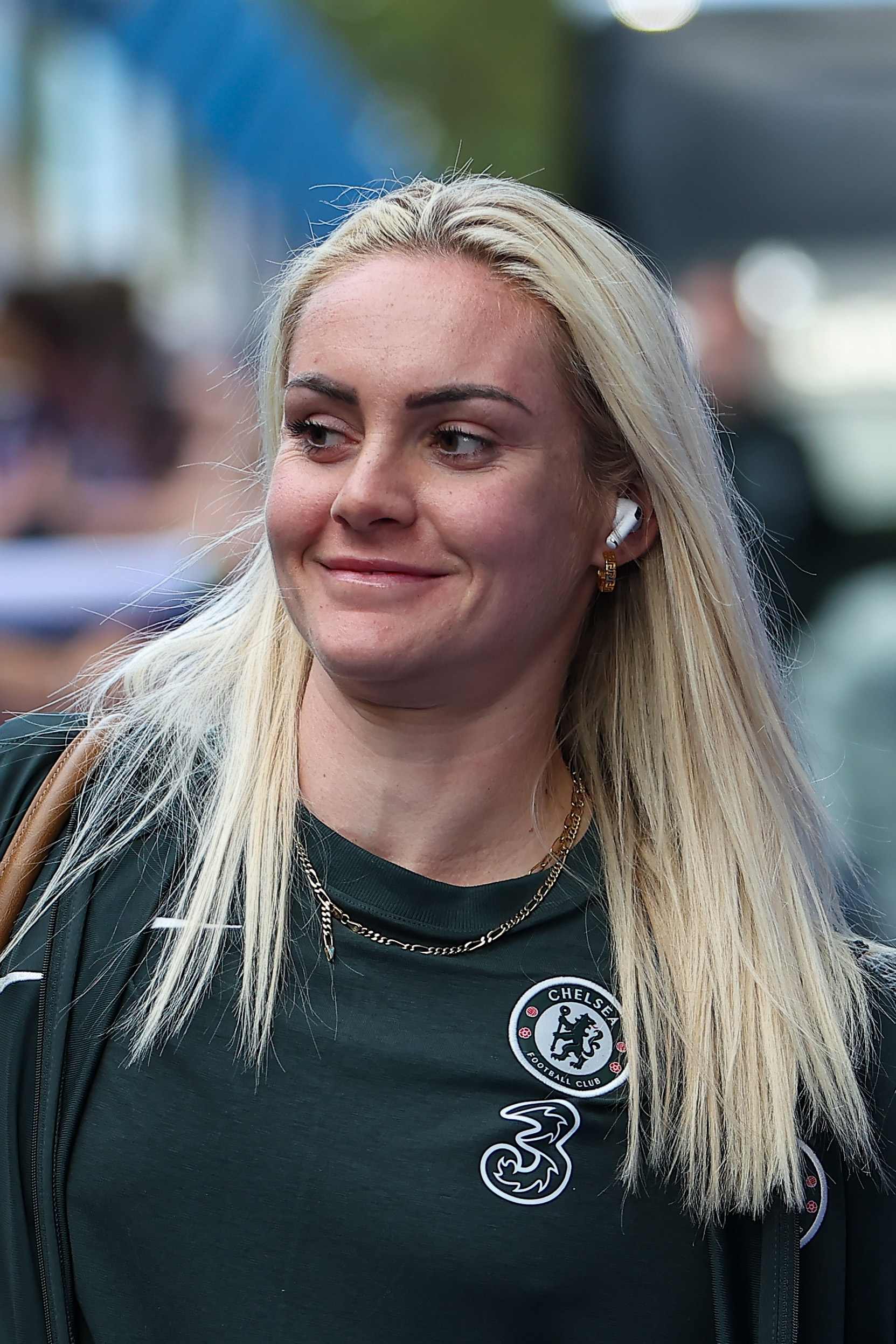
- Carpenter in 2025

Personal information
- Full name: Ellie Madison Carpenter
- Date of birth: 28 April 2000 (age 26)
- Place of birth: Cowra, New South Wales, Australia
- Height: 1.64 m (5 ft 5 in)
- Position: Right-back

Team information
- Current team: Chelsea
- Number: 2

Senior career*
Years	Team	Apps	(Gls)
2015–2017	Western Sydney Wanderers	23	(0)
2017–2019	Canberra United	21	(5)
2018–2020	Portland Thorns	35	(1)
2019–2020	→ Melbourne City (loan)	14	(2)
2020–2025	Lyon	75	(3)
2025–	Chelsea	30	(6)

International career^{‡}
2014	Australia U17	2	(0)
2014–2017	Australia U20	14	(0)
2016–	Australia	102	(5)
- * Club domestic league appearances and goals as of 21 November 2026 ‡ National team caps and goals as of 10 October 2026

Ellie Madison Carpenter (born 28 April 2000) is an Australian professional soccer player who plays as a right-back for Women's Super League club Chelsea and the Australia national team. She previously played for Western Sydney Wanderers, Canberra United and Melbourne City in Australia's W-League, Portland Thorns in the United States' National Women's Soccer League (NWSL), and Lyon in the French Première Ligue. She is regarded as one of the best female defenders in the world, with strong on-the-ball, crossing and defensive skills.

Carpenter made her debut for the Australia national team at the age of 15, the country's first international soccer player – male or female – to be born in the 2000s. She was also the youngest Australian competitor at the Rio 2016 Olympic Games, and the youngest ever female footballer to compete at the Olympics. She made her W-League debut at age 15. In May 2018, she was the youngest player to appear in an NWSL game in league history at age 18. Carpenter was named the W-League's Young Footballer of the Year three consecutive years from 2018 to 2020.

Carpenter is the first Australian to win the UEFA Women's Champions League (UWCL), having won the 2020 and 2022 finals with Lyon. She is the third Australian (male or female) to win the tournament, the first being Harry Kewell (who won the 2005 final of the men's edition with Liverpool) and the second being Zeljko Kalac with AC Milan in 2007.

== Early life and education ==
Ellie Madison Carpenter was born on 28 April 2000, in Cowra, New South Wales, located approximately 300 km (190 mi) west of Sydney. She grew up on a farm there with her parents, who were both physical education teachers. Growing up, Carpenter regularly undertook extended travels to play soccer in Young, Canberra, and Sydney.

At age 12, her family moved to Sydney so she could attend Westfields Sports High School. She attended both Cowra and Mulyan Public Schools.

At age 17, she dropped out of school to pursue her athletic career full-time.

== Club career ==
=== Western Sydney Wanderers ===
Carpenter joined Western Sydney Wanderers in September 2015. During the 2015–16 W-League season, she was a starting defender in all twelve games that she played. The Wanderers finished in seventh place during the regular season with a 3–6–3 record. Her performance during her inaugural season earned her a call-up to a training camp with the Matildas in November 2015. Despite being only 15, she was a versatile right back defender who often helped out in offensive plays overlapping and serving crosses to her teammates.

=== Canberra United ===
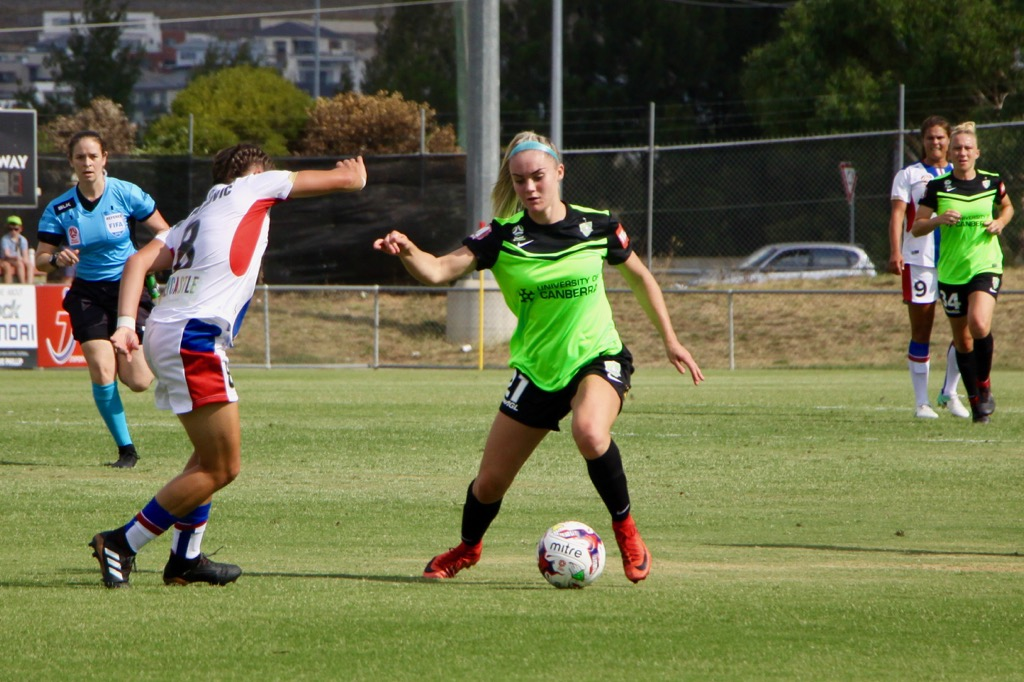
Carpenter with Canberra United, 2017

In August 2017, Carpenter signed with Canberra United for the 2017–18 W-League season. Carpenter was a starting defender in 10 of the 11 games she played and scored 2 goals. She scored her first goal during the team's 6–1 win over Adelaide United on 7 January 2018. Her next goal was the Wanderers' lone goal during a 5–1 loss to Newcastle Jets on 28 January. Canberra finished in fifth place during the regular season with a 5–6–1 record. Following the season, she was awarded the league's Young Footballer of the Year.

During the 2018–19 season, Carpenter scored a goal during the team's season-opening 2–0 win over Melbourne City. She scored her second goal of the season during a 2–2 draw against her former team, Western Sydney Wanderers on 7 December 2018. The goal was considered controversial as the Wanderers goalkeeper was down injured. Canberra finished in eighth place with a 3–4–4 record. Carpenter was named Young Footballer of the Year for the second consecutive time.

In September 2019, Carpenter announced she would be leaving Canberra for another W-League team after returning from playing with the Portland Thorns during the 2019 NWSL season. She noted, "I'm off to find a new challenge and to experience new things. My time in green will always be memorable."

=== Portland Thorns ===
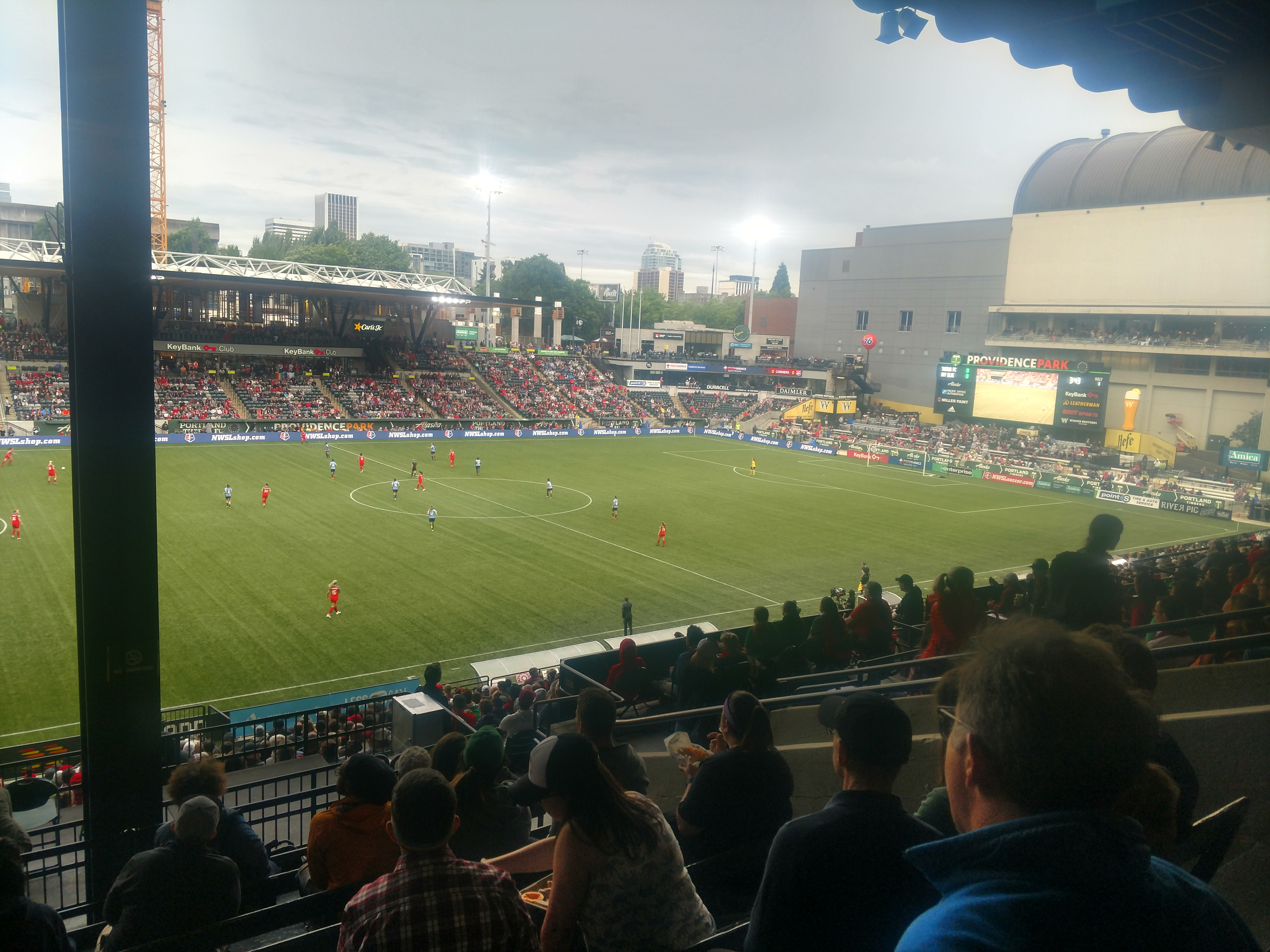
Carpenter playing for Portland Thorns, June 2018

Carpenter became the youngest player in NWSL history when she made her debut for the Portland Thorns on 9 May 2018. Ten days later, she became the youngest scorer in league history after netting the game-winning goal against the Washington Spirit 22 days after her 18th birthday. Carpenter was a starting defender in 16 of the 19 games she played during the 2018 season and scored one goal. Portland finished in second place during the regular season and advanced to the NWSL Playoffs. After defeating Reign FC 2–1 during the semi-finals, Portland was defeated 3–0 by the North Carolina Courage in the Final.

Carpenter was a starting defender in 16 of the 19 games she played in during the 2019 NWSL season. Portland finished in third place during the regular season and advanced to the Playoffs where they were defeated by Chicago Red Stars 1–0 in the semi-finals.

==== Loan to Melbourne City ====
In October 2019, Carpenter joined Melbourne City on a one-season loan. She was a starting defender in all 14 matches and scored two goals. On 20 February 2020, Carpenter scored a brace against her former team, Western Sydney Wanderers, lifting Melbourne to a 4–0 win and the league premiership. After advancing to the Final Stages, Carpenter helped Melbourne City win the Grand Final shutting out Sydney FC 1–0. Carpenter was named Young Footballer of the Year award for the third consecutive time in July 2020. Overall, from 2015 to 2020, she played a total of 58 W-League games for seven goals with Western Sydney Wanderers, Canberra United and Melbourne City.

=== Lyon ===
In June 2020, the Thorns announced the transfer of Carpenter to Lyon. On 3 July, she signed a contract that extends to 2023. On 14 August 2020, she made her first appearance for the French club in a 4–0 friendly victory over PSV Eindhoven and provided an assist for Nikita Parris. She scored her first goal for Lyon in the 2–1 victory against Bordeaux on 27 September. Carpenter was an unused sub in the Champions League final win against Wolfsburg.

She won her second Champions League in 2022, with her club beat Barcelona 3–1, though she was forced to be substituted in just over 20 minutes due to an injury. On 28 June 2022, Lyon extended their contract with Carpenter until 30 June 2026.

=== Chelsea ===
On 2 July 2025, Chelsea announced the transfer of Carpenter from Lyon on a four-year deal. In her debut match, Carpenter played as an aggressive wing-back and assisted the opening goal of the 2025–26 season with a cross to Aggie Beever-Jones who scored a close range goal in a 31st-minute opener.

== International career ==
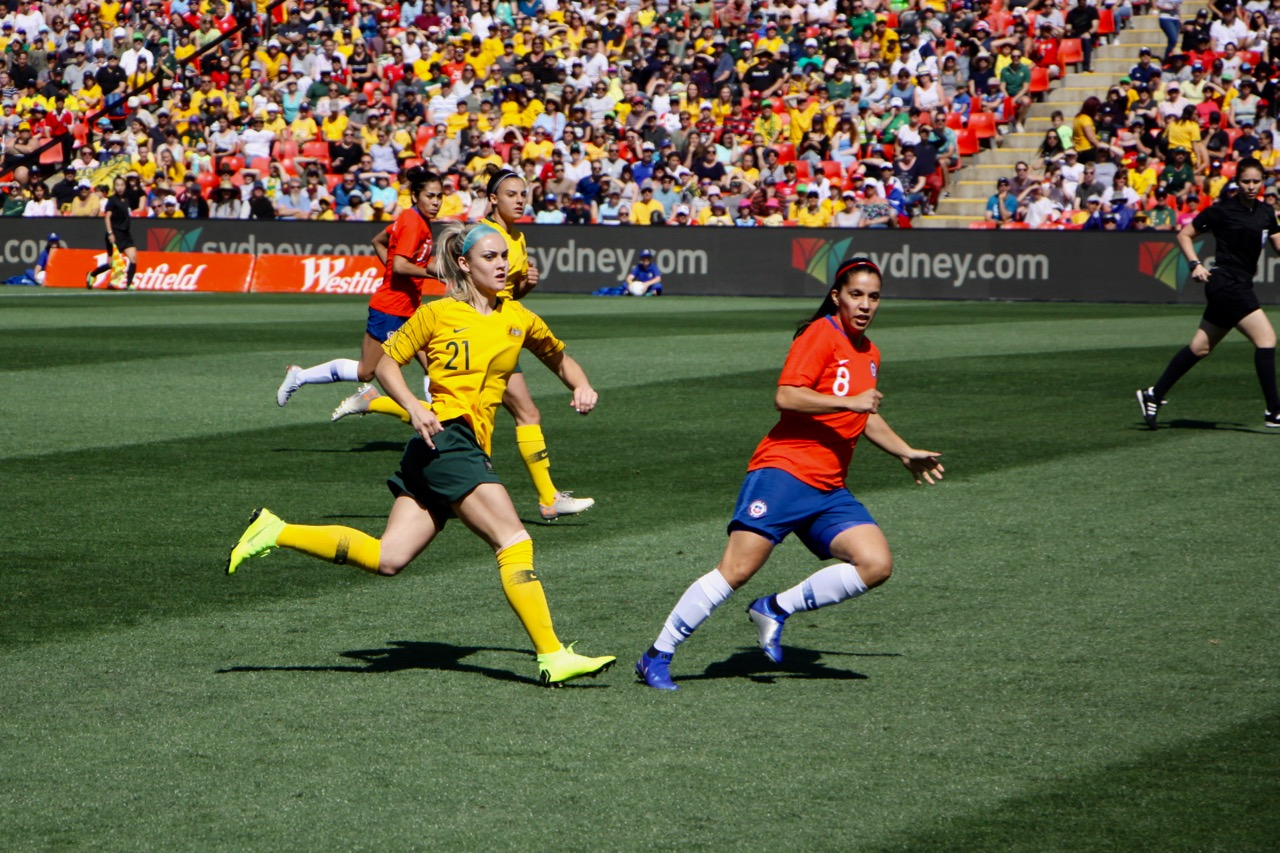
Carpenter (left) with Australia in 2018

Carpenter has represented Australia on the senior national team (commonly referred to as the Matildas) as well as the under-17, and under-20 national teams.

At the age of 14, Carpenter was first called up to the under-17 team for 2015 AFC U-16 Championship qualification in September 2014. She made her debut for the under-17 team in a win over Vietnam, playing a full match in the first game of qualification.

At the age of 15, Carpenter earned her first cap for the senior national team in a 9–0 win against Vietnam on 2 March 2016 during the Olympic Qualifiers. Her appearance marked the first Australian international (women's or men's) born since 2000. Of the game, she stated, "It was an amazing experience. In some ways keeping my concentration was quite difficult, but I felt like I kept my composure and did well."

In July 2016, Carpenter was named to the Matildas squad for the 2016 Rio Olympics. At age 16, Carpenter was the youngest Australian competitor at the 2016 Rio Olympics and the youngest-ever woman footballer to compete at the Olympics. After finishing third in their Group and finishing first in the group of third place teams, the Matildas were defeated by Brazil during an intense penalty kick shootout in the quarterfinals.

In 2017, Carpenter competed with the Matildas at the Tournament of Nations in the United States. The Australians won the tournament after a 6–1 win over Brazil. During the 28th minute of a match against the United States, Carpenter was hit directly in the face by a ball being cleared by American defender Crystal Dunn. Carpenter dropped to the ground and was later taken off the field by medical staff. Playing with gauze up her bleeding nose, she returned to the field to help the Matildas secure a 1–1 draw against the 2015 FIFA World Cup champions.

In February 2019, Carpenter was named to the Matildas squad for the inaugural FFA Cup of Nations. Carpenter helped the Matildas win the Cup.

At age 19, Carpenter made her World Cup debut at the 2019 FIFA World Cup in France during the team's first Group stage match: a 2–1 loss to Italy. The team turned it around during their second Group stage match: a 3–2 win over Brazil, becoming only the second team in tournament history to win after a two-goal deficit. After finishing second in their group after a 4–1 over Jamaica, the Matildas advanced to the Round of 16 where they faced Norway where they lost in penalty kicks.

Carpenter was a member of the Matildas Tokyo 2020 Olympics squad. The Matildas qualified for the quarter-finals and beat Great Britain before being eliminated in the semi-final with Sweden. In the playoff for the Bronze medal they were beaten by the USA.

On 3 July 2023, Carpenter was selected in the Matildas squad for the 2023 FIFA World Cup.

On 4 June 2024, Carpenter was named in the Matildas team which qualified for the Paris 2024 Olympics, her third Olympic Games selection. As through most of her career, she plays in the right-back position.

Carpenter featured in the final of the 2026 AFC Women's Asian Cup as the Matildas finished runners-up following a 1–0 loss against Japan on 21 March 2026.

== Personal life ==
On 1 January 2024, it was announced that Carpenter became engaged to Dutch footballer and former Lyon teammate Daniëlle van de Donk. They married in June 2025 at the Château Hermitage de Combas in the Occitania region of France.

Due to living in France from 2020 to 2025, she became fluent in French by 2023.

== Career statistics ==
=== Club ===
As of match played 21 November 2026

Appearances and goals by club, season and competition
Club	Season	League			National cup (Note: includes Coupe de France and Women's FA Cup)		Continental		Other		Total	
Club	Season	Division	Apps	Goals	Apps	Goals	Apps	Goals	Apps	Goals	Apps	Goals
Western Sydney Wanderers	2015–16	W-League	12	0	—		—		—		12	0
Western Sydney Wanderers	2016–17	W-League	11	0	—		—		—		11	0
Western Sydney Wanderers	Total		23	0	—		—		—		23	0
Canberra United	2017–18	W-League	10	2	—		—		—		10	2
Canberra United	2018–19	W-League	11	3	—		—		—		11	3
Canberra United	Total		21	5	—		—		—		21	5
Portland Thorns	2018	NWSL	19	1	—		—		—		19	1
Portland Thorns	2019	NWSL	16	0	—		—		—		16	0
Portland Thorns	Total		35	1	—		—		—		35	1
Melbourne City (loan)	2019–20	W-League	14	2	—		—		—		14	2
Lyon	2020–21	D1 Féminine	18	1	1	0	5 (Note: Appearances in UEFA Women's Champions League)	0	—		24	1
Lyon	2021–22	D1 Féminine	16	0	1	0	12	0	—		29	0
Lyon	2022–23	D1 Féminine	6	0	3	0	2	0	0	0	11	0
Lyon	2023–24	D1 Féminine	17	0	4	0	11	0	1 (Note: Appearance(s) in Trophée des Championnes)	0	33	0
Lyon	2024–25	D1 Féminine	18	2	1	0	10	0	—		29	2
Lyon	Total		75	3	10	0	40	0	1	0	126	3
Chelsea	2025–26	WSL	19	2	4	0	5	1	1 (Note: Appearance(s) in Women's League Cup)	0	29	3
Chelsea	2026–27	WSL	11	4	0	0	7	1	—		18	5
Chelsea	Total		30	6	4	0	12	2	1	0	47	8
Career total			198	17	14	0	52	2	2	0	266	19

=== International ===
As of match played 9 October 2026

Appearances and goals by national team and year
National team	Year	Apps	Goals
Australia	2016	4	0
Australia	2017	7	1
Australia	2018	15	0
Australia	2019	10	0
Australia	2020	4	0
Australia	2021	13	0
Australia	2022	5	2
Australia	2023	12	1
Australia	2024	14	0
Australia	2025	9	1
Australia	2026	9	0
Total		102	5

Scores and results list Australia's goal tally first, score column indicates score after each Carpenter goal.

List of international goals scored by Ellie Carpenter
No.	Date	Venue	Opponent	Score	Result	Competition
1	6 March 2017	Albufeira Municipal Stadium, Albufeira, Portugal	China	2–1	2–1	2017 Algarve Cup
2	21 January 2022	Mumbai Football Arena, Mumbai, India	Indonesia	7–0	18–0	2022 AFC Women's Asian Cup
3	21 January 2022	Mumbai Football Arena, Mumbai, India	Indonesia	10–0	18–0	2022 AFC Women's Asian Cup
4	26 October 2023	Perth Rectangular Stadium, Perth, Australia	Iran	1–0	2–0	2024 AFC Women's Olympic Qualifying Tournament
5	28 November 2025	polytec Stadium, Gosford, Australia	New Zealand	3–0	5–0	Friendly

== Honours ==
Melbourne City

- W-League Premiership: 2019–20
- W-League Championship: 2020

Olympique Lyonnais

- Division 1 Féminine: 2021–22, 2022–23, 2023–24, 2024–25
- Coupe de France: 2019–20, 2022–23
- Trophée des Championnes: 2022, 2023
- UEFA Women's Champions League: 2019–20, 2021–22

Chelsea

- Women's League Cup: 2025–26

Australia

- Tournament of Nations: 2017
- FFA Cup of Nations: 2019

Individual

- AFC Women's International Player of the Year: 2023
- IFFHS AFC Woman Team of the Decade 2011–2020
- W-League Young Footballer of the Year: 2017–18, 2018–19, 2019–20
- UNFP Première Ligue Team of the Year: 2022–23, 2023–24, 2024–25
- PFA WSL Team of the Year: 2025–26

== See also ==
- List of women's footballers with 100 or more international caps
