= Emily Gielnik =

Australian soccer player

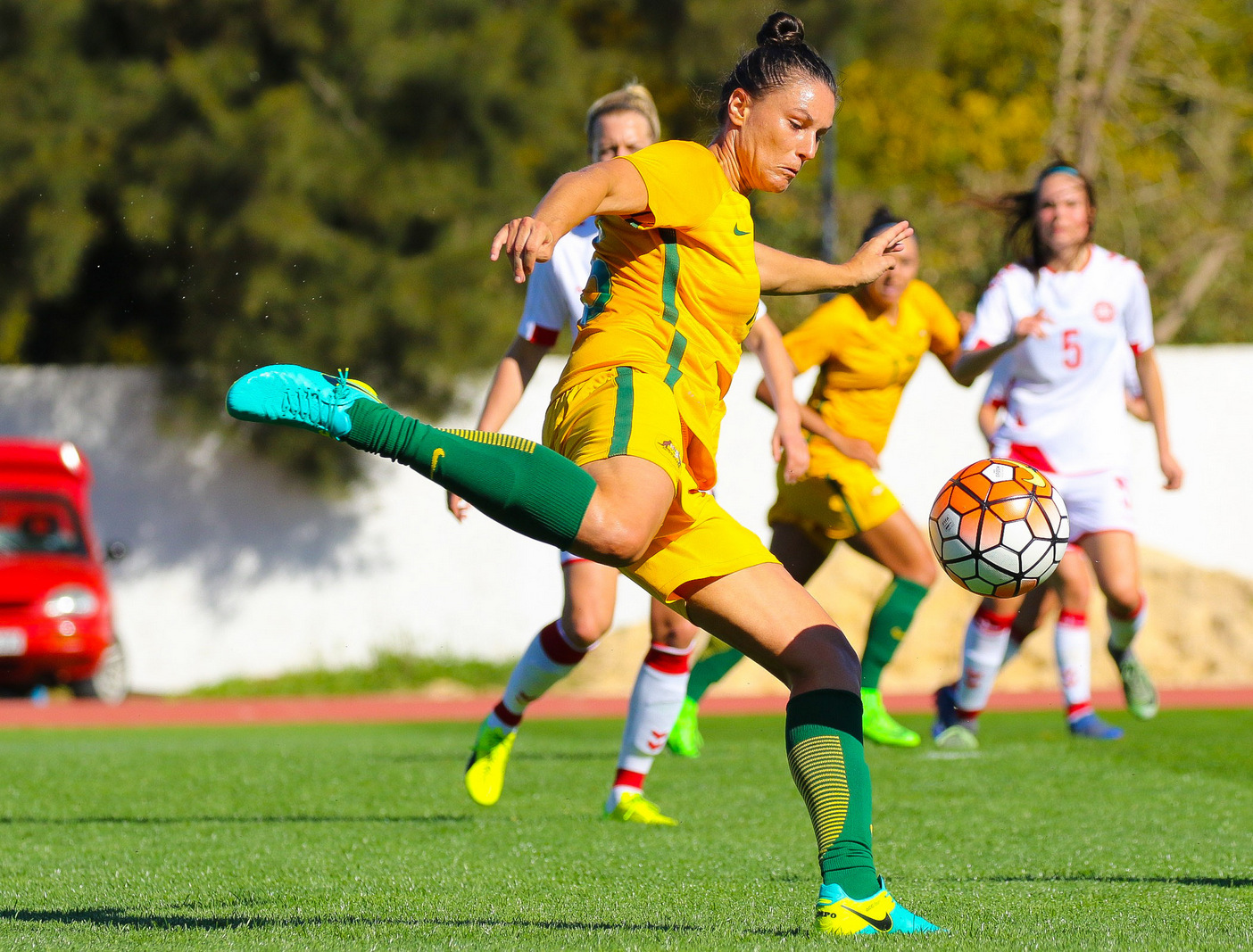
- Gielnik playing for the Matildas at the 2017 Algarve Cup

Personal information
- Date of birth: 13 May 1992 (age 34)
- Place of birth: Melbourne, Australia
- Height: 1.83 m (6 ft 0 in)
- Position: Forward

Team information
- Current team: Pumas UNAM
- Number: 15

Youth career
- Redlands United

Senior career*
Years	Team	Apps	(Gls)
2009–2018	Brisbane Roar	83	(30)
2012	Liverpool	12	(1)
2013	Ottawa Fury		
2016	Urawa Red Diamonds		
2017	Avaldsnes IL	19	(8)
2018–2019	Melbourne Victory	13	(4)
2019–2020	Bayern Munich	6	(0)
2020	Vittsjö GIK	16	(8)
2020–2021	Brisbane Roar	12	(13)
2021	Vittsjö GIK	14	(4)
2021–2023	Aston Villa	24	(3)
2023–2025	Melbourne Victory	33	(21)
2025–2026	Monterrey	10	(4)
2026–	Pumas UNAM	0	(0)

International career^{‡}
2012–	Australia	63	(13)
- * Club domestic league appearances and goals as of 2 February 2026 ‡ National team caps and goals as of 10 July 2025

Emily Gielnik (/ɡɪl.nɪk/ GILL-nick; born 13 May 1992) is an Australian professional soccer player who plays as a forward for Liga MX Femenil club Pumas UNAM and the Australia women's national team. She previously played for Aston Villa in England, Brisbane Roar and Melbourne Victory in her native Australia, Liverpool in England, Urawa Red Diamonds in Japan, Avaldsnes IL in Norway, Bayern Munich in Germany, Vittsjö GIK in Sweden, and Monterrey in Mexico.

== Early life ==
Gielnik was born on 13 May 1992 in Melbourne, Victoria. She is of Croatian descent.

== Club career ==
=== Brisbane Roar, 2009–2018 ===
Born in Melbourne, Gielnik moved to Queensland at the age of seven. After stopping basketball due to injuries she took up soccer and was eventually signed by Brisbane Roar for the second season of the W–League. At Brisbane she became recognised as a "super sub" for her knack of coming off the substitutes' bench to score late goals. Gielnik played eight seasons at Brisbane, appearing in 83 games and scoring 30 goals. She won the W-League Championship in 2010–11 and the Premiership in 2012–13 and 2017–18.

=== Liverpool LFC and Ottawa Fury, 2012–2013 ===
In May 2012, Gielnik signed for English club Liverpool L.F.C., during the 2012 FA WSL season. In October 2012, she was one of ten players to be released by Liverpool's new manager Matt Beard. In 2013, Gielnik joined Ottawa Fury for their W-League season.

=== Urawa Red Diamonds, 2016 ===
After the 2016 Olympics, Gielnik joined Japanese club Urawa Red Diamonds.

=== Avaldsnes IL, 2017 ===
Gielnik joined Norwegian team Avaldsnes IL for the 2017 season. She had a breakout season with the team, scoring eight goals in league play. Avaldsnes finished second in the Toppserien and won the Norwegian Cup.

=== Melbourne Victory, 2018–2019 ===
Gielnik signed with Melbourne Victory for the 2018–19 W-League season.

=== Bayern Munich, 2019–2020 ===
On 23 August 2019, Gielnik joined German Frauen-Bundesliga club Bayern Munich. In July 2020, she left the club after making only 6 appearances, partially due to injury.

=== Vittsjö, 2020 ===
A week after leaving Bayern Munich, Gielnik signed with another European club, joining Swedish club Vittsjö.

=== Brisbane Roar, 2020–2021 ===
In November 2020, Gielnik returned to Australia, signing with her hometown club, Brisbane Roar.

=== Aston Villa, 2021–2023 ===
In 2021, Gielnik joined the Women's Super League side Aston Villa and left in 2023 at the expiry of her contract.

=== Melbourne Victory, 2023–2025 ===
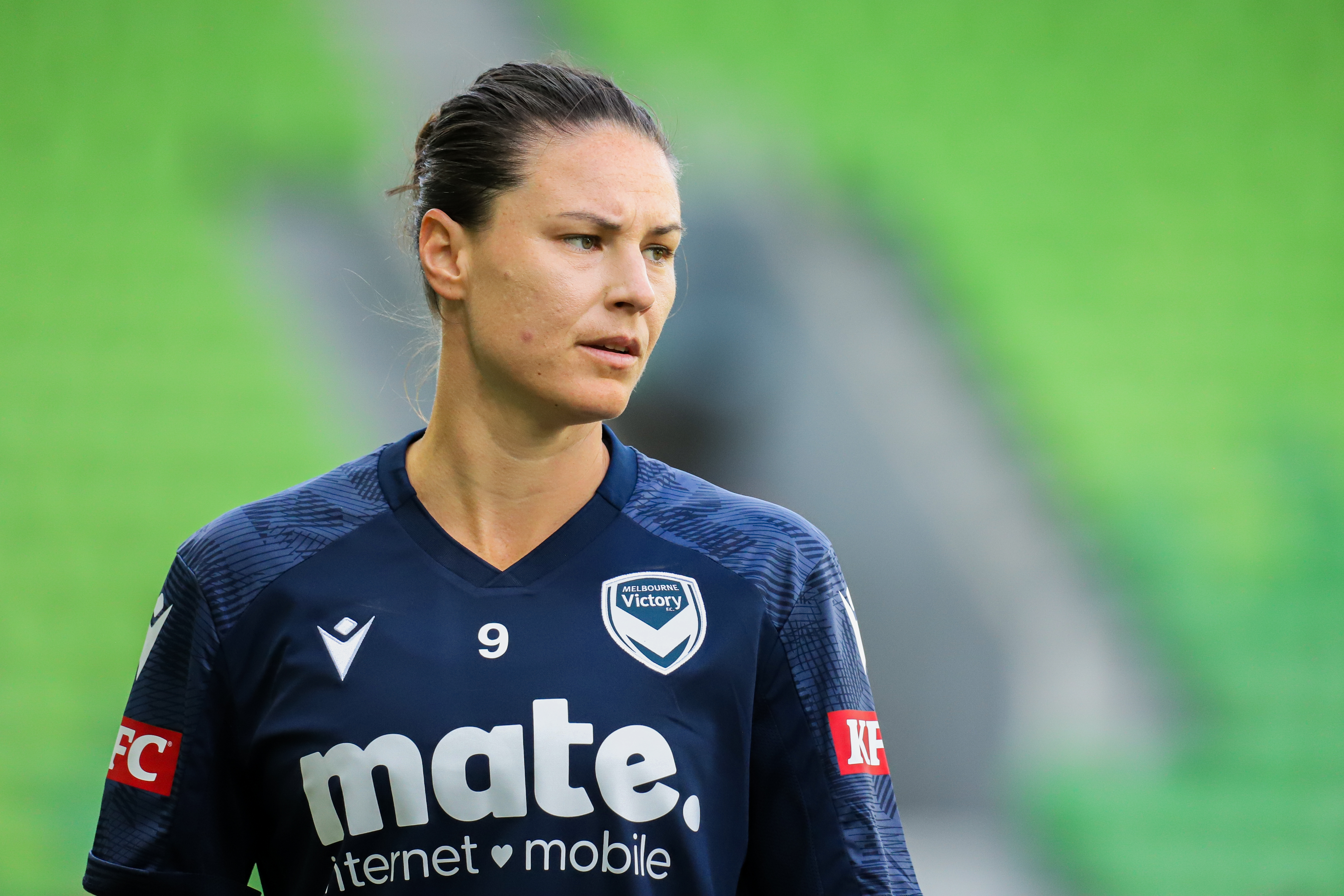
Emily Gielnik warming up before a match for Melbourne Victory, November 2023

In September 2023, Gielnik returned to Australia re-joining Melbourne Victory.

=== Monterrey, 2025–2026 ===
In July 2025, Gielnik joined Liga MX Femenil club Monterrey. She made her debut in their opening Apertura game of the 2025–26 season on 13 July 2025 in a 4–0 defeat away to UNAM Pumas.

=== Pumas UNAM, 2026– ===
In June 2026, Gielnik joined fellow Liga MX Femenil club Pumas UNAM.

== International career ==
Gielnik scored a hat-trick on her international debut for Australia U-19s in October 2011. She made her first appearance for the senior Matildas team in a 3–0 friendly defeat to World champions Japan in Tokyo on 11 July 2012.

Gielnik was named to the Australian squad for 2016 Olympic Qualifying, she scored a goal against Vietnam. Australia won the tournament and qualified for the 2016 Summer Olympics.

Gielnik was part of the Matildas squad that won the 2017 Tournament of Nations and defeated the United States for the first time ever.

At the 2018 AFC Women's Asian Cup Gielnik appeared in three matches for Australia. The Matildas advanced to the final, but lost to Japan 1–0. Australia qualified for the 2019 FIFA Women's World Cup.

In May 2019, Gielnik was named to her first World Cup team. At the World Cup Gielnik appeared in three matches for Australia, starting two of them. In the Round of 16 against Norway, she entered the match as a second-half substitute replacing Hayley Raso. With the match tied 1–1 after extra-time, the game went to penalties. Gielnik was the second penalty taker for Australia, she had her penalty saved. Australia lost to Norway 4–1 on penalties and were eliminated from the World Cup.

Gielnik was selected for the Australian women's football Matildas soccer team which qualified for the Tokyo 2020 Olympics. The Matildas advanced to the quarter-finals with one victory and a draw in the group play. In the quarter-finals they beat Great Britain 4-3 after extra time. However, they lost 1–0 to Sweden in the semi-final and were then beaten 4–3 in the bronze medal playoff by USA. Full details.

== Career statistics ==
=== International goals ===
Goal	Date	Location	Opponent	Score	Result	Competition
1	2 March 2016	Nagai Stadium, Osaka, Japan	Vietnam	1–0	9–0	2016 Olympics qualifying
2	3 March 2017	VRS António Sports Complex, Vila Real de Santo António, Portugal	Netherlands	1–0	3–2	2017 Algarve Cup
3	3 March 2017	VRS António Sports Complex, Vila Real de Santo António, Portugal	Netherlands	2–0	3–2	2017 Algarve Cup
4	6 March 2017	Albufeira Municipal Stadium, Albufeira, Portugal	China	1–1	2–1	2017 Algarve Cup
5	13 November 2018	McDonald Jones Stadium, Newcastle, Australia	Chile	4–0	5–0	Friendly
6	28 February 2019	Leichhardt Oval, Sydney, Australia	New Zealand	1–0	2–0	2019 Cup of Nations
7	3 March 2019	Suncorp Stadium, Brisbane, Australia	South Korea	4–1	4–1	2019 Cup of Nations
8	12 November 2019	Coopers Stadium, Adelaide, Australia	Chile	1–0	1–0	Friendly
9	10 April 2021	Brita-Arena, Wiesbaden, Germany	Germany	4–1	5-2	Friendly
10	10 April 2021	Brita-Arena, Wiesbaden, Germany	Germany	5–2	5-2	Friendly
11	5 August 2021	Kashima Stadium, Kashima, Japan	United States	3–4	3–4	2020 Summer Olympics
12	7 December 2024	Kardinia Park, Geelong, Australia	Chinese Taipei	3–0	6–0	Friendly
13	26 June 2025	HBF Park, Perth, Australia	Slovenia	1–0	3–0	Friendly

== Honours ==
=== Club ===
Brisbane Roar

- W-League Championship: 2010–11

Avaldsnes IL

- Norwegian Cup: 2017

Melbourne Victory

- W-League Premiership: 2018–19

=== International ===
Australia

- AFC Olympic Qualifying Tournament: 2016
- Tournament of Nations: 2017
- FFA Cup of Nations: 2019

=== Individual ===
- W-League Golden Boot: 2020−21

== Personal life ==
Gielnik married her partner Temica Sayer in 2024.
