= Karly Roestbakken =

Australian soccer player (born 2001)

Karly Røstbakken
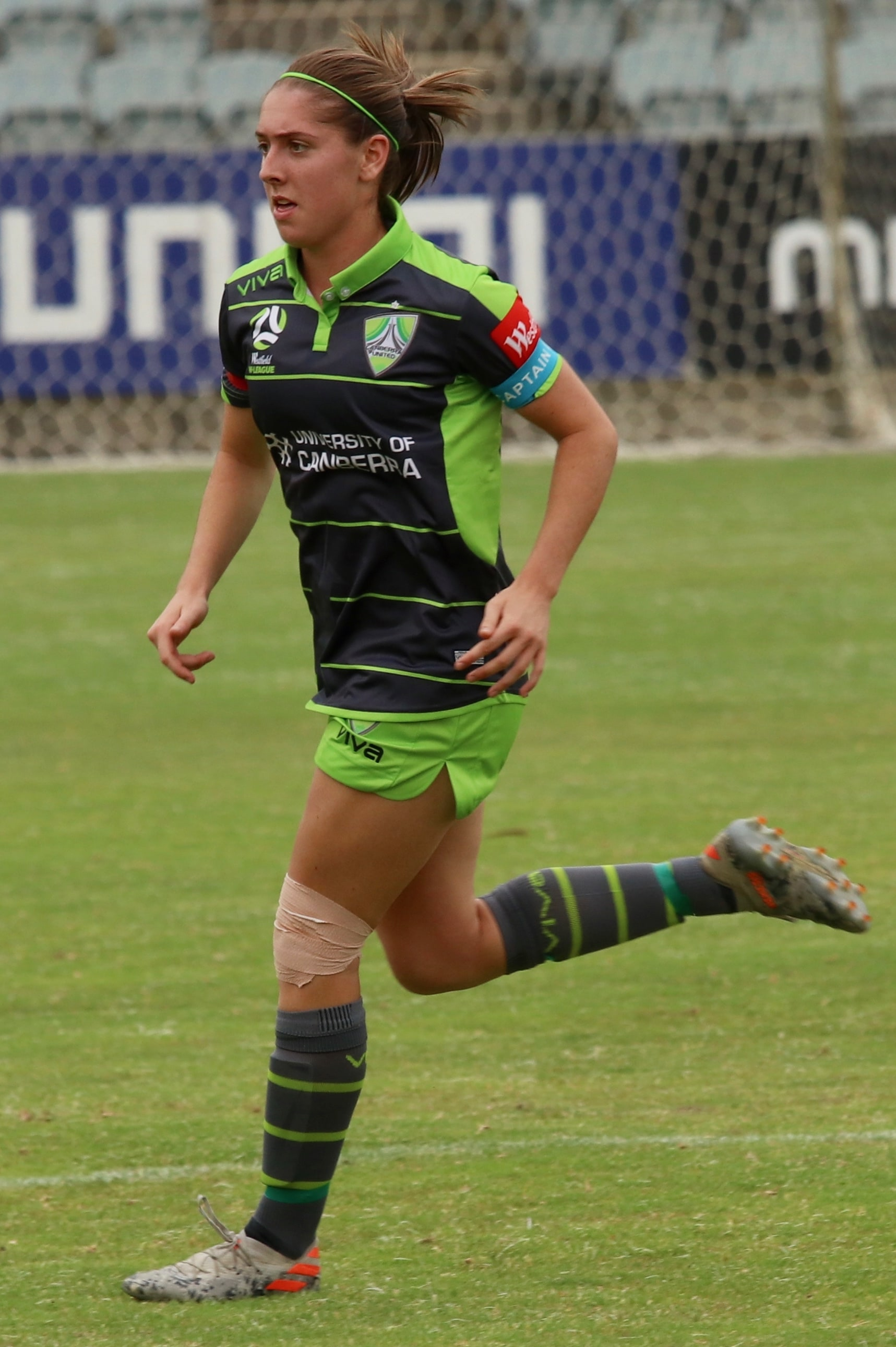
- Roestbakken with Canberra United in 2019

Personal information
- Full name: Karly Roestbakken
- Date of birth: 17 January 2001 (age 25)
- Place of birth: Queanbeyan, New South Wales, Australia
- Height: 1.65 m (5 ft 5 in)
- Position: Centre-back

Team information
- Current team: Melbourne City
- Number: 16

Youth career
- Monaro Panthers

Senior career*
Years	Team	Apps	(Gls)
2016–2020	Canberra United	34	(3)
2020–2022	LSK Kvinner	24	(0)
2021–2022	→ Canberra United (loan)	5	(0)
2022–	Melbourne City	26	(0)

International career^{‡}
2016–2017	Australia U17	6	(4)
2017–	Australia U20	10	(0)
2019–	Australia	8	(0)
- * Club domestic league appearances and goals as of 17 December 2024 ‡ National team caps and goals as of 17 December 2024

Karly Røstbakken (Norwegian: [ˈrøʂˌbakːn̩] RUHST-bah-kən; born 17 January 2001) is an Australian professional soccer player who plays as a centre-back for Melbourne City in the A-League Women in Australia.

== Club career ==
=== Canberra United ===
On 26 November 2016, Roestbakken made her professional debut aged 15 in a W-League match against the Newcastle Jets. In Canberra's next match, Roestbakken came on as a half-time substitute and became the second-youngest goalscorer in W-League history when she netted an 83rd-minute winner in a 2–1 victory over Melbourne City. She continued to play as part of the Canberra United Academy side in the NPLW Capital Football league, captaining the team to a Federation Cup Final in 2018. By the beginning of her third season, a high level of roster turnover meant she was the second longest serving Canberra player that season behind Nickoletta Flannery.

In December 2018, Roestbakken was nominated for the W-League young footballer of the year, eventually winning the award.

For the 2019–20 season, Roestbakken was appointed the co-captain of Canberra United alongside Nikola Orgill. She was 18 years old at the time of the appointment.

=== LSK Kvinner ===
In April 2020, Roestbakken transferred to the Norwegian champions, LSK Kvinner FK. Although due to the COVID-19 pandemic there was uncertainty about when she could join her new team due to the border closures.

She debuted for the Norwegian club in the first game of the 2020 Toppserien season on 3 July, playing the full 90 minutes against Rosenborg.

On 14 October 2020, Roestbakken extended her contract with LSK Kvinner until the end of the 2022 Toppserien season.

==== Loan to Canberra United ====
On the eve of the 2021–22 A-League Women season, Roestbakken was loaned back to Canberra United for a season.

=== Melbourne City ===
In October 2022, Roestbakken joined A-League Women club Melbourne City.

== International ==
In 2018, Roestbakken was called up to the Australia Under-20 squad. She was 16 at the time. She was part of the team that qualified for the 2019 AFC U-19 Women's Championship, winning all six of their qualification games.

On 6 June 2019, Roestbakken was promoted from the standby list to the senior Australia squad for the 2019 World Cup, replacing the injured Laura Alleway. Her U20 manager, Gary van Egmond, also acts as assistant with the senior team and had previously hinted at her chances of making the squad despite being uncapped, praising the teenager's work rate, technique and desire for the game. She made her senior debut as a stoppage time substitute in Australia's second group game of the World Cup, a 3–2 victory over Brazil.

== Personal life ==
Roestbakken's father, Jack, played semi-professional football in the 2. divisjon of his native Norway before moving to Australia. Her older brother, Sam Roestbakken, is also a footballer and most recently played with NPL1 team Monaro Panthers. She attended Merici College and graduated in 2018.

== Career statistics ==
=== Club ===
As of 1 December 2020

Club	Season	League			Cup^{1}		Continental^{2}		Total	
Club	Season	Division	Apps	Goals	Apps	Goals	Apps	Goals	Apps	Goals
Canberra United	2016–17	A-League Women	3	1	—		—		3	1
Canberra United	2017–18	A-League Women	10	1	—		—		10	1
Canberra United	2018–19	A-League Women	10	1	—		—		10	1
Canberra United	2019–20	A-League Women	11	0	—		—		11	0
Canberra United	Total		34	3	—		—		34	3
LSK Kvinner	2020	Toppserien	16	0	2	0	0	0	18	0
LSK Kvinner	2021	Toppserien	2	0	0	0	—		2	0
LSK Kvinner	Total		18	0	2	0	0	0	20	0
Career total			50	3	2	0	0	0	52	3

^{1}Norwegian Cup.

^{2}UEFA Women's Champions League

=== International ===
As of match played 10 April 2021

Australia
Year	Apps	Goals
2019	3	0
2020	3	0
2021	1	0
Total	7	0
