= 2023 Cup of Nations =

2023 edition of the Pinatar Cup

Tournament details
- Host country: Australia
- Dates: 16–22 February
- Teams: 4 (from 3 confederations)
- Venues: 3 (in 3 host cities)

Final positions
- Champions: Australia (2nd title)
- Runners-up: Spain
- Third place: Czech Republic
- Fourth place: Jamaica

Tournament statistics
- Matches played: 6
- Goals scored: 23 (3.83 per match)
- Top scorer(s): (Spain) Esther González (3 goals)
- Best player: (Australia) Mackenzie Arnold

The 2023 Cup of Nations was the second edition of the Cup of Nations, an international women's football tournament. It was held in Gosford, Sydney and Newcastle, Australia from 16 to 22 February 2023, and featured four teams.

Australia won the title for the second time.

== Format ==
The four invited teams played a round-robin tournament. Points awarded in the group stage followed the formula of three points for a win, one point for a draw, and zero points for a loss. A tie in points was decided by goal differential.

== Teams ==
Team	FIFA Rankings (December 2022)
Spain	7
Australia	12
Czech Republic	28
Jamaica	44

== Venues ==
Three cities were used as venues for the tournament.

Central Coast	Sydney	Newcastle
Industree Group Stadium	CommBank Stadium	McDonald Jones Stadium
Capacity: 20,059	Capacity: 30,000	Capacity: 33,000
2023 Cup of Nations is located in the Hunter-Central Coast Region

== Standings ==
Pos	Team	Pld	W	D	L	GF	GA	GD	Pts
1	Australia (H, C)	3	3	0	0	10	2	+8	9
2	Spain	3	2	0	1	8	3	+5	6
3	Czech Republic	3	1	0	2	3	9	−6	3
4	Jamaica	3	0	0	3	2	9	−7	0

Source: Soccerway
Rules for classification: 1) points; 2) goal difference; 3) goals scored; 4) head-to-head points; 5) head-to-head goal difference; 6) head-to-head number of goals scored; 7) FIFA ranking.
(C) Champions; (H) Hosts

== Matches ==
16 February 2023
16:10

Spain	3–0	Jamaica
Oroz 18'; González 45+2'; Benítez 78'	Report

Industree Group Stadium, Gosford
Referee: Lara Lee (Australia)
16 February 2023
19:10

Australia	4–0	Czech Republic
Raso 48', 55'; Kerr 70'; Polkinghorne 84'	Report

Industree Group Stadium, Gosford
Attendance: 7,702
Referee: Asaka Koizumi (Japan)

19 February 2023
14:50

Jamaica	2–3	Czech Republic
Brown 42'; Simmonds 55'	Report	Stašková 24' (pen.); Cahynová 45+4'; Pěčková 90'

CommBank Stadium, Sydney
Referee: Rebecca Durcau (Australia)
19 February 2023
18:00

Australia	3–2	Spain
Vine 11'; Polkinghorne 16'; Foord 42'	Report	Carmona 73'; Redondo 90+4'

CommBank Stadium, Sydney
Attendance: 17,333
Referee: Asaka Koizumi (Japan)

22 February 2023
15:00

Czech Republic	0–3	Spain
	Report	González 29', 40'; Del Castillo 84' (pen.)

McDonald Jones Stadium, Newcastle
Referee: Rebecca Durcau (Australia)
22 February 2023
19:10

Australia	3–0	Jamaica
Gorry 28'; Chidiac 56'; Foord 69'	Report

McDonald Jones Stadium, Newcastle
Attendance: 9,093
Referee: Yoshimi Yamashita (Japan)

== Goalscorers ==
There were 23 goals scored in 6 matches, for an average of 3.83 goals per match.

3 goals

- (Spain) Esther González

2 goals

- (Australia) Caitlin Foord
- (Australia) Clare Polkinghorne
- (Australia) Hayley Raso

1 goal

- (Australia) Alex Chidiac
- (Australia) Katrina Gorry
- (Australia) Sam Kerr
- (Australia) Cortnee Vine
- (Czech Republic) Klára Cahynová
- (Czech Republic) Alena Pěčková
- (Czech Republic) Andrea Stašková
- (Jamaica) Jody Brown
- (Jamaica) Kameron Simmonds
- (Spain) Fiamma Benítez
- (Spain) Olga Carmona
- (Spain) Athenea del Castillo
- (Spain) Maite Oroz
- (Spain) Alba Redondo
