= Aoife Colvill =

Australian footballer

Personal information
- Full name: Aoife Colvill
- Date of birth: 26 December 2000 (age 25)
- Place of birth: Cairns, Queensland, Australia
- Position: Forward

Team information
- Current team: Hibernian
- Number: 15

Senior career*
| Years | Team | Apps | (Gls) |
| 2017–2020 | Canberra United | 9 | (0) |
| 2020–2024 | Glasgow City | 35 | (18) |
| 2024–2026 | Standard Liege | | |
| 2026– | Hibernian | 7 | (6) |

International career^{‡}
| 2019 | Australia U19 | | |
| 2021– | Republic of Ireland | 1 | (0) |
- * Club domestic league appearances and goals as of 16:13, 15 November 2020 (UTC) ‡ National team caps and goals as of 11 June 2021 (UTC)

Aoife Colvill (born 26 December 2000) is a footballer who plays as a forward for Scottish Women's Premier League club Hibernian. Born in Australia, she plays for the Republic of Ireland national team.

== Club career ==
During the 2018 season, playing for Canberra United Academy, she finished as the highest scorer in the Capital Football's Premier League, scoring 42 goals in 19 games. That year, she would also make a handful of appearances for Canberra United in the W-League.

In 2020, she left Australia to move to Scotland, signing a two-year contract with Scottish Women's Premier League 1 (SWPL 1) club Glasgow City in SWPL after a three-month trial. She was part of the Glasgow squad that became the first Scottish club in history to qualify for the UEFA Women's Champions League quarter-finals in 2020. In April 2022 Colville underwent surgery for an anterior cruciate ligament injury. Following the end of the 2023–24 season, Colvill was released by Glasgow City.

In July 2024, Colvill signed for Belgian Women's Super League (Belgian WSL) club Standard Liège.

In July 2026 Colvill signed for Scottish Women's Premier League club Hibernian on a contact until July 2028

== International career ==
An Irish Australian, Colvill represented the junior Australian national team during the 2019 AFC Under-19 Women's Championship qualifiers.

In April 2021 Colvill was one of four Irish-eligible players to be invited to a senior Republic of Ireland national team training camp. In the event she suffered an injury and was unable to attend. Ireland coach Vera Pauw called up Colvill again in June 2021 for two friendlies against Iceland. She won her first senior cap in the first game, starting Ireland's 3–2 defeat at Laugardalsvöllur.

== Honours ==
=== Glasgow City ===
- Scottish Women's Premier League – 2020–21, 2022–23

=== Standard Liege ===
- Belgian Women's Cup – 2025
