= Hayley Raso =

Australian soccer player (born 1994)

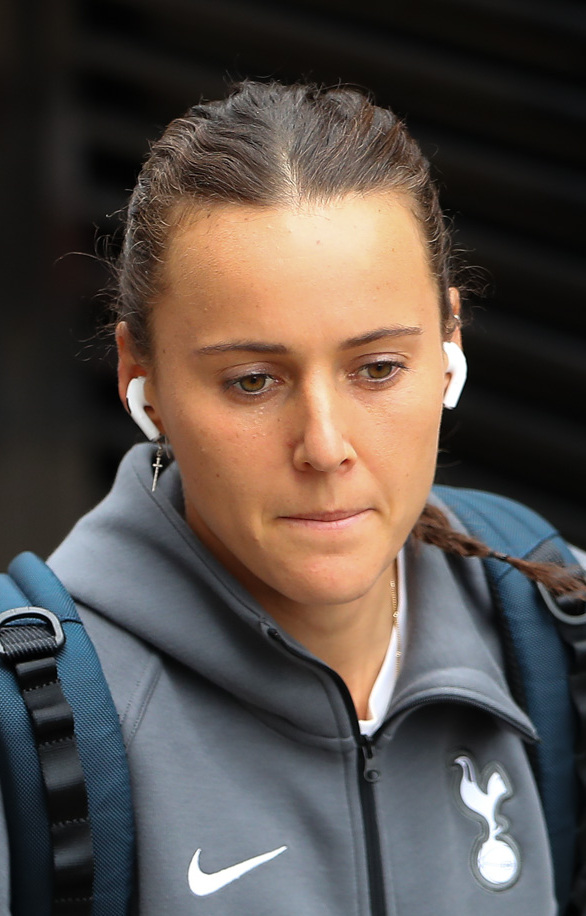
- Raso with Tottenham Hotspur in 2024

Personal information
- Full name: Hayley Emma Raso
- Date of birth: 5 September 1994 (age 32)
- Place of birth: Gold Coast, Queensland, Australia
- Height: 1.62 m (5 ft 4 in)
- Positions: Winger; striker; attacking midfielder

Team information
- Current team: Eintracht Frankfurt
- Number: 16

Youth career
- Palm Beach

Senior career*
Years	Team	Apps	(Gls)
2011–2013	Canberra United	17	(4)
2013–2014	Brisbane Roar	24	(7)
2015	Washington Spirit	9	(0)
2015–2016	→ Melbourne Victory (loan)	10	(1)
2016–2019	Portland Thorns FC	72	(13)
2016–2017	→ Canberra United (loan)	11	(2)
2017–2019	→ Brisbane Roar (loan)	15	(5)
2019–2020	Brisbane Roar	8	(4)
2020–2021	Everton	22	(5)
2021–2023	Manchester City	29	(4)
2023–2024	Real Madrid	28	(4)
2024–2025	Tottenham Hotspur	13	(1)
2025–	Eintracht Frankfurt	27	(3)

International career^{‡}
2013	Australia U20	9	(5)
2012–	Australia	111	(24)
- * Club domestic league appearances and goals as of 21 November 2026 ‡ National team caps and goals as of 10 October 2026

Hayley Emma Raso (/ˈræsoʊ/ RASS-oh; born 5 September 1994) is an Australian professional soccer player who plays as a winger for Frauen-Bundesliga club Eintracht Frankfurt and the Australia national team.

Raso began her senior career with Canberra United in 2011, and was part of the side that won the 2011–12 W-League. Since then, she had played for various clubs in the W-League and the NWSL before playing in the Women's Super League. She joined Manchester City after she was released by Everton on 17 August 2021. On 27 May 2023, it was announced Raso was leaving Women's Super League club Manchester City.

Raso has played on the Australian women's national soccer team, the Matildas, since 2012 and represented the national team in the 2019 FIFA Women's World Cup and the 2020 Summer Olympics. She previously played for the under-20 national team, the Young Matildas.

Raso was shortlisted alongside her Australian teammate Sam Kerr, for the international Ballon d'Or Féminin 2023.

== Early life ==
Raso was born and raised on the Gold Coast. She played junior football for Palm Beach and attended Emmanuel College throughout her schooling. She studied paramedicine at the Queensland University of Technology.

== Club career ==
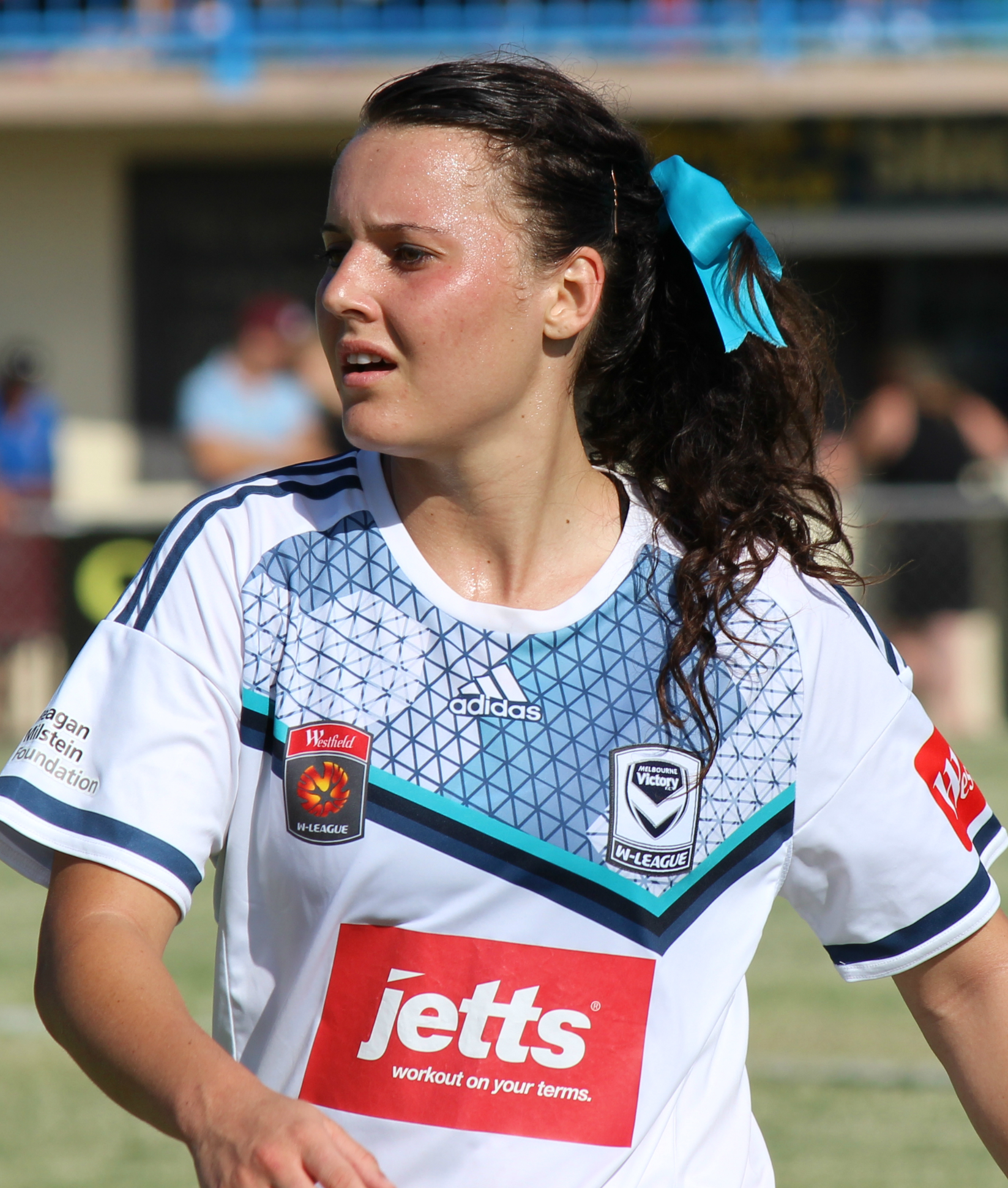
Raso playing for Melbourne Victory, 2016

=== Canberra United ===
Raso was invited to train with the Queensland Academy of Sport, but this did not result in her being awarded a scholarship. Instead, after a successful trial, Raso signed for Canberra United during the 2011–12 W-League season. She made seven league appearances for Canberra that season, and was part of the squad that won the W-League following a victory over Brisbane Roar in the grand final.

Raso remained with Canberra for the 2012–13 season, and scored her first senior goal in a 5–0 victory over Newcastle Jets on 27 October 2012. She played for Canberra in the International Women's Club Championship, but despite scoring the second goal of her career, she was unable to prevent her team from losing 4–3 to NTV Beleza in the third-place playoff. Raso ended the season having scored four goals in ten league games for Canberra.

=== Brisbane Roar ===
Prior to the start of the 2013–14 season, Raso opted to return to Brisbane, and joined Brisbane Roar FC. She made her debut for her new club against Canberra on 9 November, but was unable to prevent Brisbane from losing 3–0. On 1 December 2013, she scored her first goal for Brisbane in a 4–1 victory over Western Sydney Wanderers FC.

=== Washington Spirit ===
In June 2015, Raso was signed to the Washington Spirit of the National Women's Soccer League (NWSL) upon the conclusion of the 2015 FIFA Women's World Cup in Canada. She came on in the 73rd minute in her Spirit debut on 18 July 2015 against the Seattle Reign FC, helping preserve a 3–0 victory. She was waived by the Spirit in April 2016.

=== Portland Thorns FC ===
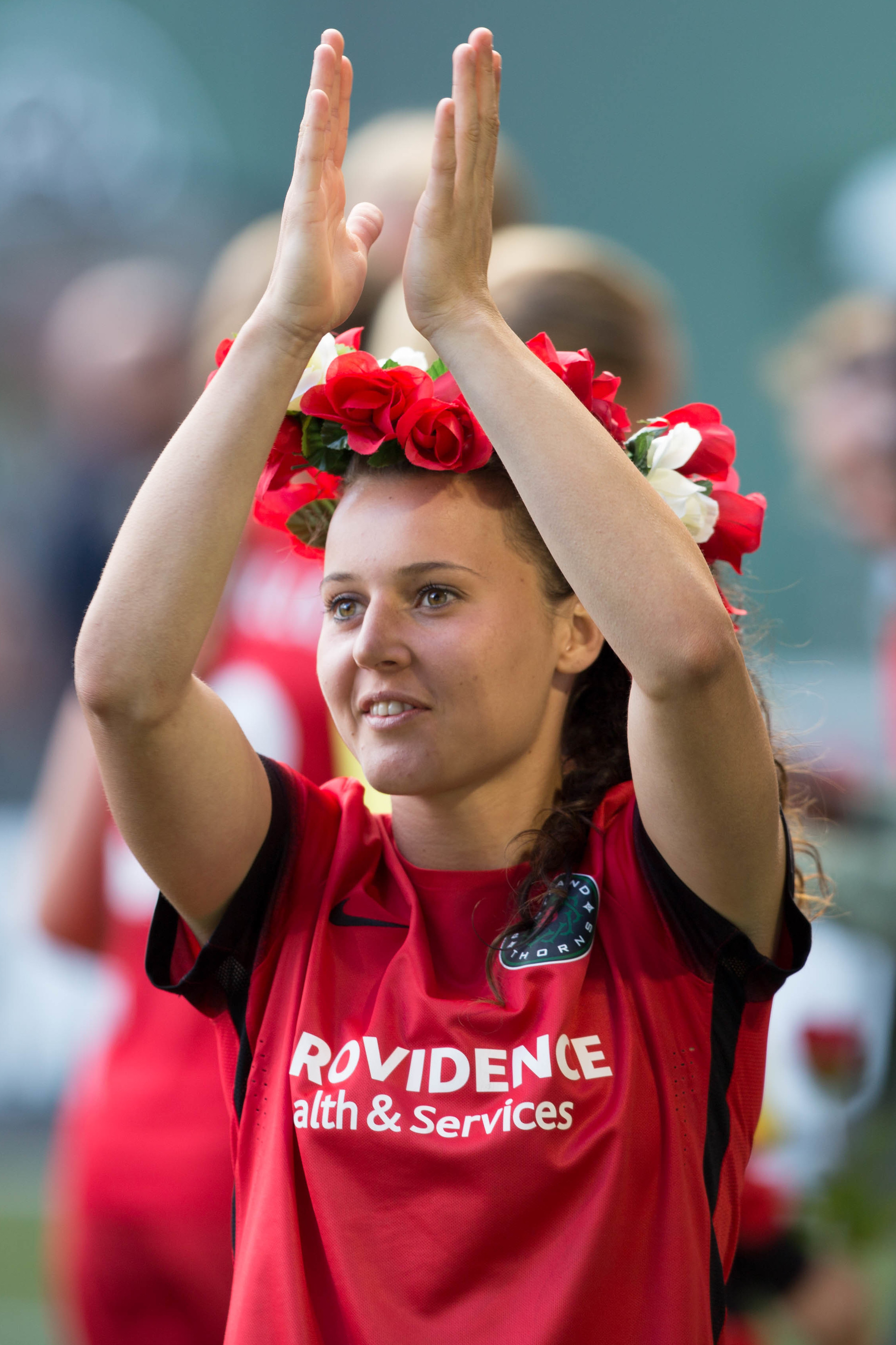
Raso with Portland Thorns FC, 2016

Shortly after being waived by the Spirit, Raso was acquired off waivers by the Portland Thorns FC. In the Thorns first four games of the 2016 season, Raso came on as a second half sub in each. She became a regular starter during the 2017 season due to a long-term injury to Tobin Heath, and scored her first NWSL goal on 28 June 2017. After which she scored five more goals in the regular season, and one in the playoffs to help the Thorns win the 2017 NWSL Championship. She was named 2017 MVP by the Rose City Riveters.

After suffering a partial tear to her lateral collateral ligament during the 2018 AFC Women's Asian Cup, she missed the first 11 games of the 2018 NWSL season. She made her season debut on 16 June and went on to play in 12 games, scoring 2 goals.

==== Back injury ====
On 25 August 2018, while playing for Portland, Raso fractured 3 vertebrae in her back in an on-field collision. The injury, caused by a knee to the back, left Raso unsure if she would walk again. After extensive rehabilitation, Raso returned 6 months after the injury at the 2019 Cup of Nations where she scored in her return match against New Zealand.

==== Canberra United (loan) ====
On 10 October 2016, it was announced Raso would be loaned to Canberra United for the 2016–17 W-League season.

==== Brisbane Roar (loan) ====
On 21 September 2017, Raso signed a loan with Brisbane Roar FC for the 2017–18 W-League season. After recovering from a back injury sustained in the 2018 Portland Thorns season, Raso signed another loan agreement with the Roar for the 2018–19 W-League. She made 4 appearances and scored 1 goal.

=== Everton ===
In January 2020, Raso was transferred to Everton in the FA Women's Super League. She would join and be free to play for them from mid February, following an international break. She was released as a free agent by Everton on 17 August 2021.

=== Manchester City ===
On 18 August 2021, Raso signed a two-year contract with Manchester City. On 31 August, Raso made her Manchester City debut as a second-half substitute in a 1–1 draw with Real Madrid in the UEFA Women's Champions League. On 27 May 2023 it was announced at the final WSL game of Manchester City's season that Raso was leaving the club.

=== Real Madrid ===
On 8 July 2023, Real Madrid announced the signing of Raso. She is the first Australian and the first ever player from the Asian Football Confederation to play for the club's first team.

=== Tottenham Hotspur ===
On 1 September 2024, Raso joined WSL club Tottenham Hotspur on a two-year contract. 19 minutes into her debut match, Raso opened the scoring against Crystal Palace with a right-footed shot into the bottom left corner.

== International career ==
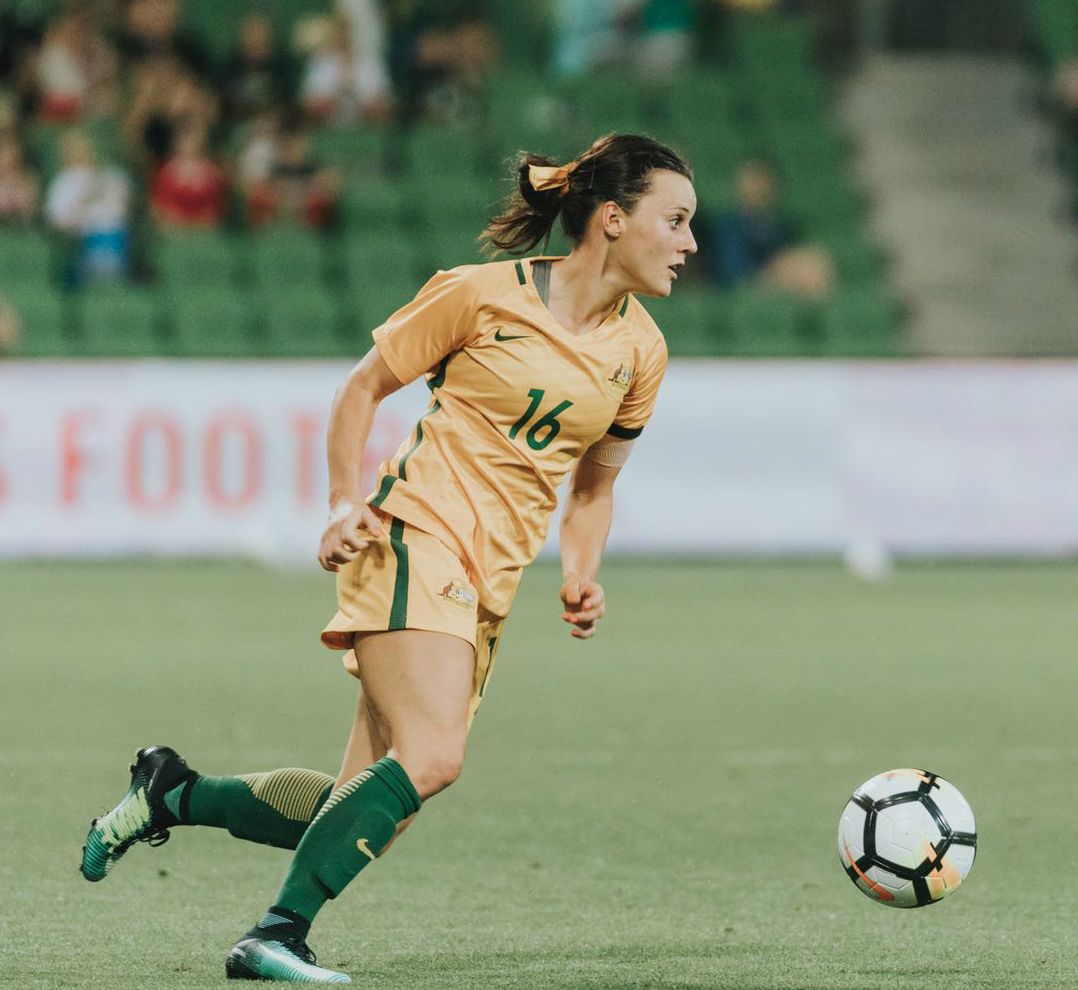
Raso with Australia in April 2016

In June 2012, Raso was called up to the Australian senior squad for the first time. She made her debut on 24 June, in a 1–1 draw with New Zealand. She was part of the Australian under-20 side at the 2013 AFF Women's Championship, and was part of the side that finished runner-up to Japan's under-23 side. Following this, she returned to the senior side for the matches against China, and played in the match held on 24 November.

Raso was a member of the Matildas Tokyo 2020 Olympics squad. The Matildas qualified for the quarter-finals and beat Great Britain before being eliminated in the semi-final with Sweden. In the playoff for the Bronze medal they were beaten by the USA.

Raso was selected in Australia's squad for the 2023 FIFA Women's World Cup. In Australia's final group match against Canada, Raso scored the first 2 goals of the game in what was a 4-0 win and was judged player of the match. Raso also scored in the Round of 16 match against Denmark.

On 4 June 2024, Raso was named in the Matildas team which qualified for the Paris 2024 Olympics, her second Olympic games selection.

On 26 October 2025, Raso earned her 100th cap in a 2–1 victory over Wales.

Raso was part of the Matildas squad which finished as runners-up at the 2026 AFC Women's Asian Cup following a 1–0 loss to Japan in the tournament's final on 21 March 2026.

== Personal life ==
In 2021, Raso co-authored a children's book, Hayley's Ribbon, based on her own early childhood experience.

== Career statistics ==
=== Club ===
As of matches played on 21 November 2026

Appearances and goals by club, season and competition
Club	Season	League			National cup		League cup		Continental		Others		Total	
Club	Season	Division	Apps	Goals	Apps	Goals	Apps	Goals	Apps	Goals	Apps	Goals	Apps	Goals
Canberra United	2011–12	W-League	7	0	—		—		—		—		7	0
Canberra United	2012–13	W-League	10	4	—		—		—		—		10	4
Canberra United	Total		17	4	—		—		—		—		17	4
Brisbane Roar	2013–14	W-League	14	4	—		—		—		—		14	4
Brisbane Roar	2014–15	W-League	10	3	—		—		—		—		10	3
Brisbane Roar	Total		24	7	—		—		—		—		24	7
Washington Spirit	2015	NWSL	9	0	—		—		—		—		9	0
Melbourne Victory (loan)	2015–16	W-League	10	1	—		—		—		—		10	1
Portland Thorns	2016	NWSL	21	0	—		—		—		—		21	0
Portland Thorns	2017	NWSL	24	7	—		—		—		—		24	7
Portland Thorns	2018	NWSL	12	2	—		—		—		—		12	2
Portland Thorns	2019	NWSL	14	4	—		—		—		—		14	4
Portland Thorns	Total		71	13	—		—		—		—		71	13
Canberra United	2016–17	W-League	11	2	—		—		—		—		11	2
Brisbane Roar (loan)	2018–19	W-League	4	1	—		—		—		—		4	1
Brisbane Roar	2019–20	W-League	8	4	—		—		—		—		8	4
Brisbane Roar	Total		12	5	—		—		—		—		12	5
Everton	2020–21	Women's Super League	22	5	2	0	2	0	—		—		26	5
Manchester City	2021–22	Women's Super League	13	3	3	1	4	0	2	0	—		22	4
Manchester City	2022–23	Women's Super League	16	1	1	0	6	4	2	0	—		25	5
Manchester City	Total		29	4	4	1	10	4	4	0	—		47	9
Real Madrid	2023–24	Liga F	28	4	2	0	—		8	0	1	0	39	4
Tottenham Hotspur	2024–25	Women's Super League	13	1	1	0	2	0	—		—		11	1
Eintracht Frankfurt	2025–26	Frauen-Bundesliga	15	1	1	0	—		8	1 (Note: Two appearances in UEFA Women's Champions League qualifying rounds and Six appearances and a goal in UEFA Women's Europa Cup)	—		24	2
Eintracht Frankfurt	2026–27	Frauen-Bundesliga	11	2	2	0	—		6	3 (Note: Four appearances in UEFA Women's Champions League qualifying rounds and two appearance and two goals in the UEFA Women's Europa Cup)	—		19	5
Eintracht Frankfurt	Total		26	3	3	0	0	0	14	4	0	0	43	7
Career total			285	53	12	1	14	4	26	4	1	0	324	62

=== International ===
As of match played on 9 October 2026

Appearances and goals by national team and year
National team	Year	Apps	Goals
Australia	2012	2	0
Australia	2013	2	0
Australia	2014	6	1
Australia	2015	3	0
Australia	2016	0	0
Australia	2017	10	0
Australia	2018	6	1
Australia	2019	11	2
Australia	2020	5	3
Australia	2021	12	0
Australia	2022	8	4
Australia	2023	16	5
Australia	2024	9	4
Australia	2025	13	4
Australia	2026	8	0
Total		111	24

Scores and results list Australia's goal tally first, score column indicates score after each Raso goal.

List of international goals scored by Hayley Raso
No.	Date	Venue	Opponent	Score	Result	Competition
1	12 March 2014	Paralimni Stadium, Paralimni, Cyprus	Italy	5–0	5–2	2014 Cyprus Cup
2	10 April 2018	Amman International Stadium, Amman, Jordan	Vietnam	8–0	8–0	2018 AFC Women's Asian Cup
3	28 February 2019	Leichhardt Oval, Sydney, Australia	New Zealand	2–0	2–0	2019 Cup of Nations
4	7 February 2020	Campbelltown Sports Stadium, Sydney, Australia	Chinese Taipei	5–0	7–0	2020 AFC Women's Olympic Qualifying Tournament
5	10 February 2020	Campbelltown Sports Stadium, Sydney, Australia	Thailand	5–0	6–0	2020 AFC Women's Olympic Qualifying Tournament
6	11 March 2020	Cẩm Phả Stadium, Cẩm Phả, Vietnam	Vietnam	2–0	2–1	2020 AFC Women's Olympic Qualifying Tournament
7	21 January 2022	Mumbai Football Arena, Mumbai, India	Indonesia	5–0	18–0	2022 AFC Women's Asian Cup
8	21 January 2022	Mumbai Football Arena, Mumbai, India	Indonesia	18–0	18–0	2022 AFC Women's Asian Cup
9	12 April 2022	GIO Stadium, Canberra, Australia	New Zealand	2–0	3–1	Friendly
10	15 November 2022	Central Coast Stadium, Gosford, Australia	Thailand	2–0	2–0	Friendly
11	16 February 2023	Industree Group Stadium, Gosford, Australia	Czech Republic	1–0	4–0	2023 Cup of Nations
12	16 February 2023	Industree Group Stadium, Gosford, Australia	Czech Republic	2–0	4–0	2023 Cup of Nations
13	31 July 2023	Melbourne Rectangular Stadium, Melbourne, Australia	Canada	1–0	4–0	2023 FIFA Women's World Cup
14	31 July 2023	Melbourne Rectangular Stadium, Melbourne, Australia	Canada	2–0	4–0	2023 FIFA Women's World Cup
15	7 August 2023	Stadium Australia, Sydney, Australia	Denmark	2–0	2–0	2023 FIFA Women's World Cup
16	28 February 2024	Marvel Stadium, Melbourne, Australia	Uzbekistan	9–0	10–0	2024 AFC Women's Olympic Qualifying Tournament
17	9 April 2024	Toyota Field, San Antonio, United States	Mexico	1–0	2–0	Friendly
18	3 June 2024	Stadium Australia, Sydney, Australia	China	2–0	2–0	Friendly
19	28 July 2024	Stade de Nice, Nice, France	Zambia	2–3	6–5	2024 Summer Olympics
20	1 December 2024	Robina Stadium, Gold Coast, Australia	Brazil	1–2	1–2	Friendly
21	26 February 2025	Snapdragon Stadium, San Diego, United States	Colombia	1–1	1–2	2025 SheBelieves Cup
22	26 June 2025	HBF Park, Perth, Australia	Slovenia	3–0	3–0	Friendly
23	28 November 2025	polytec Stadium, Gosford, Australia	New Zealand	2–0	5–0	Friendly
24	2 December 2025	Coopers Stadium, Adelaide, Australia	New Zealand	2–0	2–0	Friendly

== Honours ==
Canberra United FC

- W-League Championship: 2011–12
- W-League Premiership: 2011–12, 2016–17

Portland Thorns FC

- NWSL Championship: 2017
- NWSL Shield: 2016

Brisbane Roar FC

- W-League Premiership: 2017–18

Manchester City W.F.C.

- Women's League Cup: 2021–22

Australia

- Tournament of Nations: 2017
- FFA Cup of Nations: 2019
- FIFA Series: 2026

Individual

- Rose City Riveters Most Valuable Player: 2017

== See also ==
- List of Australia women's international soccer players
- List of foreign FA Women's Super League players
- List of Portland Thorns FC players
- List of Washington Spirit players
- List of Italian Australians
- List of women's footballers with 100 or more international caps
