= 2019 Cup of Nations =

Tournament details
- Host country: Australia
- Dates: 28 February – 6 March
- Teams: 4 (from 3 confederations)
- Venue: 3 (in 3 host cities)

Final positions
- Champions: Australia (1st title)
- Runners-up: South Korea
- Third place: New Zealand
- Fourth place: Argentina

Tournament statistics
- Matches played: 6
- Goals scored: 19 (3.17 per match)
- Attendance: 24,159 (4,027 per match)
- Top scorer: (South Korea) Ji So-yun (4 goals)
- Best player: (South Korea) Ji So-yun

The 2019 Cup of Nations was the first edition of the Cup of Nations, an international women's football tournament, held in Australia from 28 February to 6 March 2019. It consisted of a single match round-robin tournament and featured four teams.

Australia won the inaugural tournament.

== Teams ==
Team	FIFA Rankings (December 2018)
Australia	6
South Korea	14
New Zealand	19
Argentina	36

== Venues ==
Three cities were used as venues for the tournament.

Jubilee Oval was the originally announced venue for the Sydney matches, but it was changed to Leichhardt Oval due to poor pitch conditions.

Sydney	Brisbane	Melbourne
Leichhardt Oval	Suncorp Stadium	AAMI Park
Capacity: 20,000	Capacity: 52,500	Capacity: 30,050
2019 Cup of Nations is located in Australia

== Standings ==
Pos	Team	Pld	W	D	L	GF	GA	GD	Pts
1	Australia (H, C)	3	3	0	0	9	1	+8	9
2	South Korea	3	2	0	1	8	4	+4	6
3	New Zealand	3	1	0	2	2	4	−2	3
4	Argentina	3	0	0	3	0	10	−10	0

(C) Champions; (H) Hosts

All times are local (AEDT in Sydney and Melbourne, AEST in Brisbane).

== Fixtures ==
28 February 2019
16:35 AEDT

Argentina	0–5	South Korea
	Report; Summary	Moon Mi-ra 4'; Son Hwa-yeon 53'; Lee So-dam 56'; Ji So-yun 68', 75'

Leichhardt Oval, Sydney
Referee: Casey Reibelt (Australia)
28 February 2019
19:30 AEDT

Australia	2–0	New Zealand
Gielnik 44'; Raso 75'	Report; Summary

Leichhardt Oval, Sydney
Attendance: 6,805
Referee: Fusako Kajiyama (Japan)

3 March 2019
15:05 AEST

Argentina	0–2	New Zealand
	Report; Summary	Rood 50'; Bott 70'

Suncorp Stadium, Brisbane
Referee: Lara Lee (Australia)
3 March 2019
18:00 AEST

Australia	4–1	South Korea
Kerr 6' (pen.), 45+1'; De Vanna 36'; Gielnik 81'	Report; Summary	Ji So-yun 12'

Suncorp Stadium, Brisbane
Attendance: 10,520

6 March 2019
15:05 AEDT

South Korea	2–0	New Zealand
Ji So-yun 74'; Moon Mi-ra 87'	Report; Summary

AAMI Park, Melbourne
Referee: Rebecca Durcau (Australia)
6 March 2019
18:00 AEDT

Australia	3–0	Argentina
Kerr 4'; Kennedy 33'; Foord 90+4' (pen.)	Report; Summary

AAMI Park, Melbourne
Attendance: 6,834
Referee: Fusako Kajiyama (Japan)

== Goalscorers ==
There have been 19 goals scored in 6 matches, for an average of 3.17 goals per match.

4 goals

- (South Korea) Ji So-yun

3 goals

- (Australia) Samantha Kerr

2 goals

- (Australia) Emily Gielnik
- (South Korea) Moon Mi-ra

1 goal

- (Australia) Alanna Kennedy
- (Australia) Caitlin Foord
- (Australia) Hayley Raso
- (Australia) Lisa De Vanna
- (New Zealand) CJ Bott
- (New Zealand) Katie Rood
- (South Korea) Lee So-dam
- (South Korea) Son Hwa-yeon

== Broadcasters ==
=== Australia & New Zealand ===
Country	Broadcaster	Summary	Ref
Australia (host)	Fox Sports	All 6 matches live, also available on MyFootball and Kayo Sports.	
Australia (host)	SBS	3 Matildas matches only, 2 live on Viceland, 1 on delay.	
New Zealand	Sky Sport	All 6 matches exclusively live.	

=== Rest of the world ===
Country/Region	Broadcaster	Summary
International	YouTube	All 6 matches exclusively live and free on MyFootball channel.
South Korea	SBS	Taegeuk Nangja vs Matildas only, live on Sport channel also available on Naver.
