= Cup of Nations (Australia) =

Annual invitational international women's football tournament held in Australia

- Founded: 2019
- Region: Australia
- Teams: 4
- Current champions: Australia (2nd title)
- Most championships: Australia (2 titles)
- Website: Official website
- 2023 Cup of Nations

The Cup of Nations is an invitational women's soccer tournament held early in the year in Australia. In the first edition (in 2019), it was contested by Australia, Argentina, South Korea, and New Zealand.

On 12 January 2023, Football Australia confirmed the second edition would involve hosts Australia, Jamaica, Spain and Czech Republic.

The Cup of Nations is a tournament similar to the Algarve Cup, the Arnold Clark Cup, the Cyprus Women's Cup, the Istria Cup, the Pinatar Cup, the SheBelieves Cup, the Tournoi de France, the Turkish Women's Cup and the Women's Revelations Cup.

== Editions ==
Year
Year	Champions	Runners-up	Third place	Fourth place
2019	Australia	South Korea	New Zealand	Argentina
2023	Australia	Spain	Czech Republic	Jamaica

== Statistics ==
=== All-time table ===
As of the 2023 edition

Rank	Team	Tourn.	Pld	W	D	L	GF	GA	Dif	Pts
1	Australia	2	6	6	0	0	19	3	+16	18
2	Spain	1	3	2	0	1	8	3	+5	6
3	South Korea	1	3	2	0	1	8	4	+4	6
4	New Zealand	1	3	1	0	2	2	4	−2	3
5	Czech Republic	1	3	1	0	2	3	9	−6	3
6	Jamaica	1	3	0	0	3	2	9	−7	0
7	Argentina	1	3	0	0	3	0	10	−10	0

=== Participating nations ===
Team	2019	2023	Total
Argentina	4th	–	1
Australia	1st	1st	2
Czech Republic	–	3rd	1
Jamaica	–	4th	1
New Zealand	3rd	–	1
South Korea	2nd	–	1
Spain	–	2nd	1
Total	4	4	
