= W-League transfers for 2012–13 season =

Australian soccer transfers

This is a list of Australian soccer transfers for the 2012–13 W-League. Only moves featuring at least one W-League club are listed.

== Transfers ==
All players without a flag are Australian. Clubs without a flag are clubs participating in the W-League. All transfers between W-League clubs include a free transfer period in the off-season since prior to the 2017–18 season, the W-League didn't have multi-year contracts.

=== Pre-season ===
Date	Name	Moving from	Moving to
1 February 2012	(New Zealand) Anna Green	Adelaide United	(Germany) Lokomotive Leipzig
2 February 2012	(United States) Ashleigh Gunning	Adelaide United	(Norway) Arna-Bjørnar
3 February 2012	(New Zealand) Aroon Clansey	Canberra United	(England) Liverpool
25 February 2012	Tanya Oxtoby	Perth Glory	(England) Doncaster Rovers Belles
27 February 2012	(England) Jodie Taylor	Melbourne Victory	(England) Birmingham City
7 March 2012	(United States) Taryn Hemmings	Canberra United	(United States) Boston Breakers
9 March 2012	(United States) Kendall Fletcher	Melbourne Victory	(Sweden) Vittsjö
28 March 2012	(Cameroon) Estelle Johnson	Sydney FC	(United States) New York Fury
6 July 2012	Alanna Kennedy	Newcastle Jets	Sydney FC
6 July 2012	Sam Kerr	Perth Glory	Sydney FC
8 August 2012	(Iceland) Þóra Björg Helgadóttir	(Sweden) Malmö	Western Sydney Wanderers (loan)
15 August 2012	Mackenzie Arnold	Perth Glory	Canberra United
16 August 2012	Lydia Williams	Canberra United	Unattached
29 August 2012	(Germany) Ariane Hingst	Newcastle Jets	Canberra United
25 September 2012	(United States) Tiffany Boshers	Unattached	Newcastle Jets
25 September 2012	(United States) Tori Huster	(United States) Western New York Flash	Newcastle Jets
25 September 2012	(United States) Angela Salem	(United States) Western New York Flash	Newcastle Jets
28 September 2012	(New Zealand) Sarah McLaughlin	(New Zealand) Claudelands Rovers	Adelaide United
28 September 2012	(New Zealand) Holly Patterson	(New Zealand) Claudelands Rovers	Adelaide United
2 October 2012	Trudy Burke	(Australia) Illawarra Stingrays	Canberra United
2 October 2012	Grace Field	(Australia) Woden Valley	Canberra United
2 October 2012	Catherine Brown	(Australia) Woden Valley	Canberra United
2 October 2012	Samantha Wood	(Australia) Canberra FC	Canberra United
2 October 2012	(New Zealand) Emma Kete	Canberra United	Sydney FC
2 October 2012	Ellyse Perry	Canberra United	Sydney FC
2 October 2012	Ellyse Perry	Canberra United	Sydney FC
2 October 2012	Eliza Campbell	Unattached	Newcastle Jets
2 October 2012	Madeline Searl	(Australia) Lake Macquarie City	Newcastle Jets
2 October 2012	Kate Hensman	Unattached	Newcastle Jets
2 October 2012	Sammara Schmitzer	Unattached	Newcastle Jets
2 October 2012	Alisha Foote	Unattached	Newcastle Jets
2 October 2012	(England) Mikaela Howell	(United States) D.C. United	Newcastle Jets
2 October 2012	Michaela Hatzirodos	Brisbane Roar	Newcastle Jets
2 October 2012	Kimberley Witt	Unattached	Newcastle Jets
2 October 2012	Alannah Rosewood	Unattached	Newcastle Jets
2 October 2012	Rhali Dobson	Newcastle Jets	Unattached
4 October 2012	Collette McCallum	(England) Lincoln Ladies	Perth Glory
4 October 2012	Kate Gill	Unattached	Perth Glory
4 October 2012	Aivi Luik	Brisbane Roar	Perth Glory
4 October 2012	(England) Carly Telford	(England) Chelsea	Perth Glory (loan)
4 October 2012	(Canada) Sasha Andrews	Unattached	Perth Glory
4 October 2012	(New Zealand) Elizabeth Milne	(New Zealand) Glenfield Rovers	Perth Glory
4 October 2012	Bronwyn Studman	Unattached	Perth Glory
4 October 2012	Rosie Sutton	Unattached	Perth Glory
4 October 2012	Thia Eastman	Unattached	Perth Glory
4 October 2012	Kirri Bolton	Unattached	Perth Glory
4 October 2012	Zoe Palandri	Unattached	Perth Glory
4 October 2012	Sarah Walsh	Sydney FC	Western Sydney Wanderers
4 October 2012	Catherine Cannuli	Brisbane Roar	Western Sydney Wanderers
4 October 2012	Teigen Allen	Sydney FC	Western Sydney Wanderers
4 October 2012	Servet Uzunlar	Sydney FC	Western Sydney Wanderers
4 October 2012	Trudy Camilleri	Unattached	Western Sydney Wanderers
4 October 2012	Jenna Kingsley	Unattached	Western Sydney Wanderers
4 October 2012	Jessica Seaman	(Australia) Gladesville Ravens	Western Sydney Wanderers
4 October 2012	Samantha Spackman	Unattached	Western Sydney Wanderers
4 October 2012	Olivia Kennedy	Unattached	Western Sydney Wanderers
4 October 2012	Alesha Clifford	Unattached	Western Sydney Wanderers
4 October 2012	Alexandra Huynh	Newcastle Jets	Western Sydney Wanderers
4 October 2012	Rachael Soutar	Sydney FC	Western Sydney Wanderers
4 October 2012	Linda O'Neill	Newcastle Jets	Western Sydney Wanderers
4 October 2012	Alisha Bass	Sydney FC	Western Sydney Wanderers
4 October 2012	Lizzie Durack	(Australia) North West Sydney Koalas	Western Sydney Wanderers
4 October 2012	Vanessa Hart	Unattached	Western Sydney Wanderers
8 October 2012	Thea Slatyer	Sydney FC	Retired
10 October 2012	(New Zealand) Annalie Longo	(New Zealand) Three Kings United	Sydney FC
10 October 2012	(New Zealand) Hannah Bromley	(New Zealand) Glenfield Rovers	Sydney FC
10 October 2012	Kylie Ledbrook	Sydney FC	Retired
10 October 2012	Heather Garriock	Sydney FC	Unattached
10 October 2012	Nicola Bolger	Newcastle Jets	Sydney FC
10 October 2012	Sian McLaren	Adelaide United	Sydney FC
10 October 2012	Amy Harrison	Unattached	Sydney FC
10 October 2012	Elizabeth Ralston	Unattached	Sydney FC
10 October 2012	Meg McLaughlin	Unattached	Sydney FC
10 October 2012	Larissa Crummer	Unattached	Sydney FC
10 October 2012	Natalie Tobin	Unattached	Sydney FC
17 October 2012	Casey Dumont	Brisbane Roar	Unattached
17 October 2012	Kate Stewart	Unattached	Brisbane Roar
17 October 2012	Emma Pittman	(Australia) The Gap	Brisbane Roar
17 October 2012	Georgia Chapman	(Australia) Redlands United	Brisbane Roar
17 October 2012	Joanne Buckley	(Australia) Redlands United	Brisbane Roar
17 October 2012	(Japan) Sachiko Tatsuoka	(Australia) Redlands United	Brisbane Roar
17 October 2012	Erika Elze	Perth Glory	Brisbane Roar
17 October 2012	Katrina Gorry	Melbourne Victory	Brisbane Roar
17 October 2012	Amy Chapman	(United States) Los Angeles Strikers	Brisbane Roar
17 October 2012	(England) Hannah Beard	(United States) Los Angeles Strikers	Brisbane Roar
18 October 2012	Leanne Slater	Adelaide United	Retired
18 October 2012	Katherine Ebbs	Adelaide United	(United States) Embry–Riddle Eagles
18 October 2012	Donna Cockayne	Adelaide United	Unattached
18 October 2012	Ebony Philcox	Adelaide United	Unattached
18 October 2012	Angela Fimmano	Adelaide United	Unattached
18 October 2012	Nenita Burgess	Adelaide United	Unattached
18 October 2012	Vanessa Reed	Adelaide United	Unattached
18 October 2012	Daniela Di Bartolo	Adelaide United	Unattached
18 October 2012	Greta French-Kennedy	Adelaide United	Unattached
18 October 2012	Alex Natoli	(Australia) FFV NTC	Adelaide United
18 October 2012	Jessie Wharepouri	(Australia) Manly United	Adelaide United
18 October 2012	Cassandra Tsoumbris	(Australia) Fulham United	Adelaide United
18 October 2012	Jenna McCormick	(Australia) Adelaide University	Adelaide United
18 October 2012	Elise Whorlow	(Australia) Adelaide City	Adelaide United
18 October 2012	Ann Mayo	(Australia) Illawarra Stingrays	Adelaide United
18 October 2012	Lorena Maggio	(Australia) Eastern Suburbs	Adelaide United
18 October 2012	Jessica Waterhouse	(Australia) FFSA NTC	Adelaide United
18 October 2012	Laura Johns	(Australia) Adelaide City	Adelaide United
18 October 2012	Kelly Baltrop	(Australia) Adelaide City	Adelaide United
19 October 2012	Joanne Burgess	Brisbane Roar	Unattached
19 October 2012	Kim Carroll	Brisbane Roar	Unattached
19 October 2012	(Spain) Olga Cebrián García	Brisbane Roar	Unattached
19 October 2012	Ellen Beaumont	Brisbane Roar	Retired
19 October 2012	Georgia Rowntree	Unattached	Western Sydney Wanderers
19 October 2012	(England) Katie Holtham	Perth Glory	(England) Doncaster Rovers Belles (end of loan)
19 October 2012	Sadie Lawrence	Perth Glory	Unattached
19 October 2012	Emily Dunn	Perth Glory	Unattached
19 October 2012	Kristy Teschinsky	Perth Glory	Unattached
19 October 2012	Danielle Calautti	Perth Glory	Unattached
19 October 2012	Katarina Jukic	Perth Glory	Unattached
19 October 2012	Lara Filocamo	Perth Glory	Unattached
19 October 2012	Tiffany Eliadis	Unattached	Melbourne Victory
19 October 2012	Cindy Lay	Unattached	Melbourne Victory
19 October 2012	Rita Mankowska	Melbourne Victory	Unattached
19 October 2012	Melissa Barbieri	Newcastle Jets	Unattached
19 October 2012	Monnique Kofoed	Newcastle Jets	Unattached
19 October 2012	Cassandra Koppen	Newcastle Jets	Unattached
19 October 2012	Alison Logue	Newcastle Jets	Unattached
19 October 2012	Nicole Jones	Newcastle Jets	Unattached

=== Mid-season ===
Date	Name	Moving from	Moving to
25 October 2012	(United States) Jessica McDonald	Unattached	Melbourne Victory
8 November 2012	(Wales) Jess Fishlock	(England) Bristol Academy	Melbourne Victory
8 November 2012	(Sweden) Petra Larsson	(Sweden) Linköping	Melbourne Victory (loan)
10 November 2012	(Sweden) Louise Fors	(Sweden) Linköping	Western Sydney Wanderers
1 December 2012	(United States) Nikki Washington	Unattached	Canberra United
14 December 2012	(England) Kristy Moore	(Norway) Stabæk	Adelaide United
20 December 2012	Maja Blasch	Unattached	Perth Glory
1 January 2013	(United States) Kristie Mewis	(United States) Boston College Eagles	Canberra United
4 January 2013	(United States) Nikki Washington	Canberra United	Unattached
4 January 2013	Maja Blasch	Perth Glory	Unattached
4 January 2013	(United States) Kaitlyn Savage	(United States) FIU Panthers	Perth Glory

== Re-signings ==
Date	Name	Club
6 July 2012	Danielle Brogan	Sydney FC
6 July 2012	Caitlin Foord	Sydney FC
28 September 2012	(New Zealand) Abby Erceg	Adelaide United
2 October 2012	Caitlin Cooper	Canberra United
2 October 2012	Georgia Yeoman-Dale	Canberra United
2 October 2012	Christine Walters	Canberra United
2 October 2012	Caitlin Munoz	Canberra United
2 October 2012	Ellie Brush	Canberra United
2 October 2012	Hayley Raso	Canberra United
2 October 2012	Grace Gill	Canberra United
2 October 2012	Snez Veljanovska	Canberra United
2 October 2012	Michelle Heyman	Canberra United
2 October 2012	Sally Rojahn	Canberra United
2 October 2012	Nicole Sykes	Canberra United
2 October 2012	Ashleigh Sykes	Canberra United
2 October 2012	Sally Shipard	Canberra United
2 October 2012	Jennifer Bisset	Canberra United
2 October 2012	Hannah Brewer	Newcastle Jets
2 October 2012	Hayley Crawford	Newcastle Jets
2 October 2012	Gemma Pearce	Newcastle Jets
2 October 2012	Gema Simon	Newcastle Jets
2 October 2012	Tara Andrews	Newcastle Jets
2 October 2012	Emily van Egmond	Newcastle Jets
2 October 2012	Bronte Bates	Newcastle Jets
2 October 2012	(England) Stacey Day	Newcastle Jets
4 October 2012	Sarah Carroll	Perth Glory
4 October 2012	(Wales) Carys Hawkins (Note: Hawkins spent the off-season at Umeå.)	Perth Glory
4 October 2012	Shannon May	Perth Glory
4 October 2012	Ella Mastrantonio	Perth Glory
4 October 2012	Jaymee Gibbons	Perth Glory
4 October 2012	Elisa D'Ovidio	Perth Glory
4 October 2012	Marianna Tabain	Perth Glory
4 October 2012	Shawn Billam	Perth Glory
10 October 2012	Kyah Simon	Sydney FC
10 October 2012	Renee Rollason	Sydney FC
10 October 2012	Teresa Polias	Sydney FC
10 October 2012	Brittany Whitfield	Sydney FC
10 October 2012	Sham Khamis	Sydney FC
10 October 2012	Chloe Logarzo	Sydney FC
17 October 2012	Clare Polkinghorne	Brisbane Roar
17 October 2012	Elise Kellond-Knight	Brisbane Roar
17 October 2012	Laura Alleway	Brisbane Roar
17 October 2012	Brooke Spence	Brisbane Roar
17 October 2012	Ashley Spina	Brisbane Roar
17 October 2012	Lana Harch	Brisbane Roar
17 October 2012	Vedrana Popovic	Brisbane Roar
17 October 2012	Rebecca Price	Brisbane Roar
17 October 2012	Tameka Butt	Brisbane Roar
17 October 2012	Emily Gielnik	Brisbane Roar
17 October 2012	(Japan) Hoshimi Kishi	Brisbane Roar
18 October 2012	Kristi Harvey	Adelaide United
18 October 2012	Ruth Wallace	Adelaide United
18 October 2012	Racheal Quigley	Adelaide United
18 October 2012	Marijana Rajcic	Adelaide United
18 October 2012	Grace Henry	Adelaide United
18 October 2012	Emma Checker	Adelaide United
18 October 2012	Georgia Macri	Adelaide United
19 October 2012	Brianna Davey	Melbourne Victory
19 October 2012	(United States) Danielle Johnson	Melbourne Victory
19 October 2012	Maika Ruyter-Hooley	Melbourne Victory
19 October 2012	(New Zealand) Rebekah Stott	Melbourne Victory
19 October 2012	Stephanie Catley	Melbourne Victory
19 October 2012	Ashley Brown	Melbourne Victory
19 October 2012	Caitlin Friend	Melbourne Victory
19 October 2012	Jacqui Vogt	Melbourne Victory
19 October 2012	Enza Barilla	Melbourne Victory
19 October 2012	Amy Jackson	Melbourne Victory
19 October 2012	(Turkey) Gülcan Koca	Melbourne Victory
19 October 2012	Cassandra Dimovski	Melbourne Victory
