= 2012–13 Adelaide United FC (women) season =

Adelaide United (W-League)
2012–13 season
- Chairman: Greg Griffin
- Head Coach: David Edmondson
- Stadium: Burton Park
- W-League: 8th
- W-League Finals: DNQ
- Top goalscorer: Sarah McLaughlin; Racheal Quigley (4 each)
- Biggest win: 2–0 vs. Newcastle Jets (H) (15 December 2012); W-League
- Biggest defeat: 0–5 vs. Melbourne Victory (H) (1 December 2012); W-League
Home colours	Away colours

The 2012–13 season was Adelaide United Football Club's fifth season, in the W-League. Adelaide United finished 8th in their W-League season.

== Players ==
Note: Flags indicate national team as defined under FIFA eligibility rules; some limited exceptions apply. Players may hold more than one non-FIFA nationality.

No.	Pos.	Nation	Player
1	GK	AUS	Kristi Harvey
2	DF	AUS	Ruth Wallace
3	DF	AUS	Alex Natoli
4	DF	AUS	Jessie Wharepouri
5	DF	NZL	Abby Erceg (Captain)
6	MF	AUS	Cassie Tsoumbris
7	FW	AUS	Racheal Quigley
8	MF	NZL	Sarah McLaughlin
9	FW	AUS	Marijana Rajcic
10	FW	AUS	Jenna McCormick

No.	Pos.	Nation	Player
11	DF	AUS	Grace Henry
12	DF	AUS	Elise Whorlow
13	MF	AUS	Ann Mayo
14	MF	AUS	Lorena Maggio
15	DF	AUS	Emma Checker
16	MF	AUS	Jess Waterhouse
17	MF	AUS	Laura Johns
18	MF	AUS	Georgia Macri
19	MF	NZL	Holly Patterson
20	GK	AUS	Kelly Barltrop

== Competitions ==
=== Overall record ===
Competition	First match	Last match	Starting round	Final position	Record							
Competition	First match	Last match	Starting round	Final position	Pld	W	D	L	GF	GA	GD	Win %
W-League	20 October 2012	12 January 2013	Matchday 1	8th	12	2	0	10	12	40	−28	16.67
Total					12	2	0	10	12	40	−28	16.67

Source: Competitions

=== W-League ===
==== League table ====
Pos	Team	Pld	W	D	L	GF	GA	GD	Pts	Qualification
1	Brisbane Roar	12	8	2	2	28	15	+13	26	Qualification to Finals series
2	Perth Glory	12	7	3	2	34	20	+14	24	Qualification to Finals series
3	Melbourne Victory	12	7	2	3	26	14	+12	23	Qualification to Finals series
4	Sydney FC (C)	12	6	2	4	30	24	+6	20	Qualification to Finals series
5	Canberra United	12	5	3	4	25	20	+5	18	
6	Western Sydney Wanderers	12	4	1	7	19	23	−4	13	
7	Newcastle Jets	12	1	3	8	15	33	−18	6	
8	Adelaide United	12	2	0	10	12	40	−28	6	

Source: au.soccerway.com
Rules for classification: 1) points; 2) goal difference; 3) number of goals scored.
(C) Champions

==== Results summary ====
Overall								Home						Away					
Pld	W	D	L	GF	GA	GD	Pts	W	D	L	GF	GA	GD	W	D	L	GF	GA	GD
12	2	0	10	12	40	−28	6	2	0	4	7	17	−10	0	0	6	5	23	−18

Source: worldfootball.net

==== Results by round ====
Round	1	2	3	4	5	6	7	8	9	10	11	12
Ground	H	A	A	H	A	H	H	A	H	A	A	H
Result	W	L	L	L	L	L	L	L	W	L	L	L
Position	2	5	6	7	8	8	8	8	7	7	7	8
Points	3	3	3	3	3	3	3	6	6	6	6	6

Source: worldfootball.net
A = Away; H = Home; W = Win; D = Draw; L = Loss

==== Matches ====
The league fixtures were announced on 18 September 2012.

Win Draw Loss

20 October 2012 1	Adelaide United	4–3	Western Sydney Wanderers	Adelaide
14:00 ACDT	Quigley 33'; McLaughlin 77', 80', 88'	Report	Uzunlar 6', 21'; Kingsley 54'	Stadium: Burton Park; Referee: Catherine Hoffman

27 October 2012 2	Perth Glory	2–1	Adelaide United	Perth
15:00 AWST	Gill 45'; D'Ovidio 88'	Report	Mayo 41'	Stadium: Intiga Stadium; Referee: Renee Silvester

3 November 2012 3	Canberra United	3–1	Adelaide United	Canberra
16:00 AEDT	Cooper 63'; Brush 78'; Wood 84'	Report	Quigley 38'	Stadium: McKellar Park; Attendance: 782

10 November 2012 4	Adelaide United	0–2	Brisbane Roar	Adelaide
14:00 ACDT		Report	Chapman 9'; Kellond-Knight 63'	Stadium: Hindmarsh Stadium; Referee: Rebecca Durcau

17 November 2012 5	Newcastle Jets	4–0	Adelaide United	Newcastle
16:30 AEDT	Andrews 8'; Salem 39' (pen.); Hensman 51'; Huster 66'	Report		Stadium: Wanderers Oval

24 November 2012 6	Adelaide United	0–4	Sydney FC	Adelaide
14:00 ACDT		Report	Rollason 4'; Kete 11'; Logarzo 58', 77'	Stadium: Burton Park; Referee: Renee Silvester

1 December 2012 7	Adelaide United	0–5	Melbourne Victory	Adelaide
14:00 ACDT		Report	Spiranovic 8'; McDonald 38', 42'; Barilla 49'; Catley 90'	Stadium: Burton Park; Referee: Kelly Jones

8 December 2012 8	Western Sydney Wanderers	4–0	Adelaide United	Sydney
14:00 AEDT	Fors 6', 67'; Walsh 8'; Uzunlar 40'	Report		Stadium: Campbelltown Stadium; Referee: Lara Smith

15 December 2012 9	Adelaide United	2–0	Newcastle Jets	Adelaide
16:00 ACDT	Moore 67'; Wallace 70'	Report		Stadium: Burton Park; Referee: Katie Patterson

22 December 2012 10	Brisbane Roar	6–2	Adelaide United	Brisbane
15:00 AEST	Chapman 20'; Gielnik 23', 35', 90+3'; Popovic 58'	Report	Moore 65'; Quigley 77'	Stadium: A.J. Kelly Park; Referee: Peta McCallum

5 January 2013 11	Melbourne Victory	4–1	Adelaide United	Melbourne
16:00 AEDT	Johnson 2'; Larsson 6'; McDonald 14'; Spiranovic 57'	Report	McLaughlin 87'	Stadium: Wembley Park; Referee: Kirralee Andruschak

12 January 2013 12	Adelaide United	1–3	Perth Glory	Adelaide
14:00 ACDT	Quigley 52'	Report	Gill 18', 65'; Tabain 86'	Stadium: Burton Park; Referee: Kelly Jones
