= 2012–13 Western Sydney Wanderers FC (women) season =

Western Sydney Wanderers (W-League)
2012–13 season
- Chairman: Lyall Gorman
- Head Coach: Stephen Roche
- Stadium: Campbelltown Stadium
- W-League: 6th
- W-League Finals: DNQ
- Top goalscorer: Louise Fors (5)
- Biggest win: 4–0 vs. Adelaide United (H) (8 December 2012); W-League
- Biggest defeat: 0–5 vs. Canberra United (A) (8 January 2013); W-League
Home colours	Away colours

The 2012–13 season was Western Sydney Wanderers Football Club's first season in the W-League. Western Sydney Wanderers finished 6th in their W-League season.

== Players ==
Note: Flags indicate national team as defined under FIFA eligibility rules; some limited exceptions apply. Players may hold more than one non-FIFA nationality.

No.	Pos.	Nation	Player
1	GK	AUS	Liz Durack
2	DF	AUS	Samantha Spackman
3	DF	AUS	Alexandra Huynh
4	DF	AUS	Alesha Clifford
5	MF	AUS	Olivia Kennedy
6	MF	AUS	Rachel Soutar
7	FW	AUS	Jenna Kingsley
8	MF	AUS	Vanessa Hart
9	FW	AUS	Sarah Walsh (captain)
10	MF	AUS	Servet Uzunlar

No.	Pos.	Nation	Player
11	MF	SWE	Louise Fors
12	DF	AUS	Jessica Seaman
13	FW	AUS	Catherine Cannuli
14	MF	AUS	Trudy Camilleri
15	MF	AUS	Teigen Allen
16	MF	AUS	Linda O'Neill
17	MF	AUS	Alisha Bass
18	MF	AUS	Candace Sciberras
20	GK	ISL	(Thora) Þóra Björg Helgadóttir

=== Transfers in ===
No.	Position	Name	From	Type/fee	Date	Ref.
20	GK	(Iceland) Þóra Björg Helgadóttir	(Sweden) Malmö	Loan	8 August 2012	
1	GK	Lizzie Durack	(Australia) North West Sydney Koalas	Free transfer	4 October 2012	
2	DF	Samantha Spackman	Free agent	Free transfer	4 October 2012	
3	DF	Alexandra Huynh	Newcastle Jets	Free transfer	4 October 2012	
4	DF	Alesha Clifford	Free agent	Free transfer	4 October 2012	
5	MF	Olivia Kennedy	Free agent	Free transfer	4 October 2012	
6	DF	Rachel Soutar	Sydney FC	Free transfer	4 October 2012	
7	FW	Jenna Kingsley	Free agent	Free transfer	4 October 2012	
8	MF	Vanessa Hart	Free agent	Free transfer	4 October 2012	
9	FW	Sarah Walsh	Sydney FC	Free transfer	4 October 2012	
10	MF	Servet Uzunlar	Sydney FC	Free transfer	4 October 2012	
12	DF	Jessica Seaman	(Australia) Gladesville Ravens	Free transfer	4 October 2012	
13	FW	Catherine Cannulli	Brisbane Roar	Free transfer	4 October 2012	
14	FW	Trudy Camilleri	Free agent	Free transfer	4 October 2012	
15	MF	Teigen Allen	Sydney FC	Free transfer	4 October 2012	
16	MF	Linda O'Neill	Newcastle Jets	Free transfer	4 October 2012	
17	MF	Alisha Bass	Sydney FC	Free transfer	4 October 2012	
—	GK	Georgia Rowntree	Free agent	19 October 2012		
11	MF	(Sweden) Louise Fors	(Sweden) Linköping	10 November 2012		

== Technical staff ==
Position	Name
Head coach	(Australia) Stephen Roche
Assistant coach	(Australia) Lisa Warrener
Strength & conditioning coach	(Australia) Danny Deigan

== Competitions ==
=== Overall record ===
Competition	First match	Last match	Starting round	Final position	Record							
Competition	First match	Last match	Starting round	Final position	Pld	W	D	L	GF	GA	GD	Win %
W-League	21 October 2012	12 January 2013	Matchday 1	4th	12	6	2	4	30	24	+6	50.00
Total					12	6	2	4	30	24	+6	50.00

Source: Competitions

=== W-League ===
==== League table ====
Pos	Team	Pld	W	D	L	GF	GA	GD	Pts	Qualification
1	Brisbane Roar	12	8	2	2	28	15	+13	26	Qualification to Finals series
2	Perth Glory	12	7	3	2	34	20	+14	24	Qualification to Finals series
3	Melbourne Victory	12	7	2	3	26	14	+12	23	Qualification to Finals series
4	Sydney FC (C)	12	6	2	4	30	24	+6	20	Qualification to Finals series
5	Canberra United	12	5	3	4	25	20	+5	18	
6	Western Sydney Wanderers	12	4	1	7	19	23	−4	13	
7	Newcastle Jets	12	1	3	8	15	33	−18	6	
8	Adelaide United	12	2	0	10	12	40	−28	6	

Source: au.soccerway.com
Rules for classification: 1) points; 2) goal difference; 3) number of goals scored.
(C) Champions

==== Results summary ====
Overall								Home						Away					
Pld	W	D	L	GF	GA	GD	Pts	W	D	L	GF	GA	GD	W	D	L	GF	GA	GD
12	4	1	7	19	23	−4	13	3	1	2	13	6	+7	1	0	5	6	17	−11

Source: worldfootball.net

==== Results by round ====
Round	1	2	3	4	5	6	7	8	9	10	11	12
Ground	A	A	H	H	A	H	A	H	H	A	A	H
Result	L	L	W	D	W	W	L	W	L	L	L	L
Position	7	7	5	6	4	4	6	6	6	6	6	6
Points	0	0	3	4	7	10	10	13	13	13	13	13

Source: worldfootball.net
A = Away; H = Home; W = Win; D = Draw; L = Loss

==== Matches ====
The league fixtures were announced on 18 September 2012.

Win Draw Loss

20 October 2012 1	Adelaide United	4–3	Western Sydney Wanderers	Adelaide
14:00 ACDT	Quigley 33'; McLaughlin 77', 80', 88'	Report	Uzunlar 6', 21'; Kingsley 54'	Stadium: Burton Park; Referee: Catherine Hoffman

27 October 2012 2	Sydney FC	1–0	Western Sydney Wanderers	Sydney
14:00 AEDT	Kete 29'	Report		Stadium: Leichhardt Oval; Attendance: 841; Referee: Peta McCallum

3 November 2012 3	Western Sydney Wanderers	2–0	Perth Glory	Sydney
14:00 AEDT	Camilleri 43', 61'	Report		Stadium: Campbelltown Stadium; Referee: Alison Logue

11 November 2012 4	Western Sydney Wanderers	1–1	Canberra United	Sydney
14:00 AEDT	Allen 23'	Report	Munoz 73'	Stadium: Campbelltown Stadium; Referee: Kate Jacewicz

17 November 2012 5	Brisbane Roar	1–2	Western Sydney Wanderers	Brisbane
15:00 AEST	Chapman 49'	Report	Cannuli 7', 56'	Stadium: Cleveland Showgrounds; Referee: Katie Patterson

25 November 2012 6	Western Sydney Wanderers	3–0	Newcastle Jets	Sydney
14:00 AEDT	Walsh 23', 54'; Sciberras 90+3'	Report		Stadium: Campbelltown Stadium; Referee: Kate Jacewicz

1 December 2012 7	Perth Glory	3–0	Western Sydney Wanderers	Perth
16:00 AWST	Tabain 17'; Gill 25'; McCallum 59'	Report		Stadium: Intiga Stadium; Referee: Renee Silvester

8 December 2012 8	Western Sydney Wanderers	4–0	Adelaide United	Sydney
14:00 AEDT	Fors 6', 67'; Walsh 8'; Uzunlar 40'	Report		Stadium: Campbelltown Stadium; Referee: Lara Smith

16 December 2012 9	Western Sydney Wanderers	1–2	Brisbane Roar	Sydney
15:00 AEDT	Fors 68'	Report	Butt 21'; Gielnik 27'	Stadium: Campbelltown Stadium; Referee: Catherine Hoffman

22 December 2012 10	Melbourne Victory	3–1	Western Sydney Wanderers	Melbourne
14:00 AEDT	McDonald 5', 90'; Larsson 11'	Report	Hart 2'	Stadium: Wembley Park; Attendance: 1,257; Referee: Casey Reibelt

8 January 2013 11	Canberra United	5–0	Western Sydney Wanderers	Canberra
14:00 AEDT	Raso 34'; Heyman 44'; Munoz 74'; Hart 82' (o.g.); Mewis 89'	Report		Stadium: McKellar Park; Attendance: 712 (Note: Attendance was 564 at the abandonment of the match.); Referee: Rebecca Durcau
Note: Match originally scheduled for 14:00 AEDT, but delayed due to lightning. It was rescheduled for 19:30 AEDT. Match then abandoned after 36 minutes due to lightning on 5 January 2013. It was rescheduled and replayed for 8 January 2013.

12 January 2013 12	Western Sydney Wanderers	2–3	Sydney FC	Sydney
10:00 AEDT	Fors 30', 74' (pen.)	Report	Foord 9'; Kerr 39'; Bolger 83'	Stadium: Campbelltown Stadium; Referee: Kate Jacewicz

== Statistics ==
=== Appearances and goals ===
Includes all competitions. Players with no appearances not included in the list.

No.	Pos.	Nat.	Name	W-League		Total	
No.	Pos.	Nat.	Name	Apps	Goals	Apps	Goals
1	GK	(Australia)	Liz Durack	4+1	0	5	0
2	MF	(Australia)	Samantha Spackman	11	0	11	0
3	DF	(Australia)	Alexandra Huynh	10+1	0	11	0
4	DF	(Australia)	Alesha Clifford	10	0	10	0
5	MF	(Australia)	Olivia Kennedy	10	0	10	0
6	DF	(Australia)	Rachel Soutar	1+3	0	4	0
7	FW	(Australia)	Jenna Kingsley	3	1	3	1
8	MF	(Australia)	Vanessa Hart	11	1	11	1
9	FW	(Australia)	Sarah Walsh	12	3	12	3
10	DF	(Australia)	Servet Uzunlar	10	3	10	3
11	MF	(Sweden)	Louise Fors	9	5	9	5
12	DF	(Australia)	Jessica Seaman	1+8	0	9	0
13	FW	(Australia)	Catherine Cannuli	10	2	10	2
14	MF	(Australia)	Trudy Camilleri	7+5	2	12	2
15	DF	(Australia)	Teigen Allen	10	1	10	1
16	MF	(Australia)	Linda O'Neill	5+6	0	11	0
17	MF	(Australia)	Alisha Bass	0+4	0	4	0
18	MF	(Australia)	Candace Schiberras	0+1	0	1	0
20	GK	(Iceland)	Þóra Björg Helgadóttir	8	0	8	0

=== Disciplinary record ===
Includes all competitions. The list is sorted by squad number when total cards are equal. Players with no cards not included in the list.

Rank	No.	Pos.	Nat.	Name	W-League			Total		
Rank	No.	Pos.	Nat.	Name	Yellow card	(yellow card) (yellow-red card)	Red card	Yellow card	(yellow card) (yellow-red card)	Red card
1	16	MF	(Australia)	Linda O'Neill	3	0	0	3	0	0
2	3	DF	(Australia)	Alexandra Huynh	2	0	0	2	0	0
3	4	DF	(Australia)	Alesha Clifford	1	0	0	1	0	0
3	10	DF	(Australia)	Servet Uzunlar	1	0	0	1	0	0
3	14	MF	(United States)	Trudy Camilleri	1	0	0	1	0	0
3	20	GK	(Iceland)	Þóra Björg Helgadóttir	1	0	0	1	0	0
Total					9	0	0	9	0	0

=== Clean sheets ===
Includes all competitions. The list is sorted by squad number when total clean sheets are equal. Numbers in parentheses represent games where both goalkeepers participated and both kept a clean sheet; the number in parentheses is awarded to the goalkeeper who was substituted on, whilst a full clean sheet is awarded to the goalkeeper who was on the field at the start of play. Goalkeepers with no clean sheets not included in the list.

Rank	No.	Nat.	Goalkeeper	W-League	Total
1	20	(Iceland)	Þóra Björg Helgadóttir	2	2
1	1	(Australia)	Liz Durack	1	1
Total				3	3
