= 2012–13 Sydney FC (women) season =

Sydney FC (W-League)
2012–13 season
- Chairman: Scott Barlow
- Head Coach: Alen Stajcic
- Stadium: Leichhardt Oval
- W-League: 4th
- W-League Finals: Winners
- Top goalscorer: League: Sam Kerr; Kyah Simon (6 each); All: Sam Kerr (9)
- Biggest win: 4–0 vs. Adelaide United (A) (24 November 2012); W-League; 4–0 vs. Newcastle Jets (A) (23 December 2012); W-League
- Biggest defeat: 1–3 vs. Perth Glory (A) (17 November 2012); W-League; 5–7 vs. Perth Glory (H) (15 December 2012); W-League; 0–2 vs. Brisbane Roar (H) (5 January 2013); W-League
Home colours	Away colours	Third colours

The 2012–13 season was Sydney Football Club's fifth season, in the W-League. Sydney FC finished 4th in their W-League season, finishing as winners in the Grand Final.

== Players ==
Note: Flags indicate national team as defined under FIFA eligibility rules; some limited exceptions apply. Players may hold more than one non-FIFA nationality.

No.	Pos.	Nation	Player
1	GK	AUS	Sian Fryer-McLaren
2	MF	AUS	Teresa Polias
3	DF	AUS	Elizabeth Ralston
4	FW	AUS	Sam Kerr
5	FW	AUS	Meg McLaughlin
6	MF	AUS	Natalie Tobin
7	MF	AUS	Nicola Bolger
8	FW	AUS	Amy Harrison
9	DF	AUS	Caitlin Foord
10	DF	AUS	Renee Rollason
11	MF	NZL	Annalie Longo

No.	Pos.	Nation	Player
12	FW	AUS	Chloe Logarzo
13	FW	AUS	Larissa Crummer
14	MF	AUS	Alanna Kennedy
15	DF	NZL	Hannah Bromley
16	DF	AUS	Ellyse Perry
17	FW	AUS	Kyah Simon
18	FW	AUS	Brittany Whitfield
19	FW	NZL	Emma Kete
20	GK	AUS	Sham Khamis
21	MF	AUS	Kylie Ledbrook
22	MF	ENG	Lillie Fenlon-Billson

== Transfers ==
=== Transfers in ===
No.	Position	Name	From	Type/fee	Date	Ref.
4	FW	Sam Kerr	Perth Glory	Free transfer	6 July 2012	
14	MF	Alanna Kennedy	Newcastle Jets	Free transfer	6 July 2012	
16	DF	Ellyse Perry	Canberra United	Free transfer	2 October 2012	
19	FW	(New Zealand) Emma Kete	Canberra United	Free transfer	2 October 2012	
1	GK	Sian Fryer-McLaren	Adelaide United	Free transfer	10 October 2012	
3	DF	Meg McLaughlin	Free agent	Free transfer	10 October 2012	
5	FW	Elizabeth Ralston	Free agent	Free transfer	10 October 2012	
6	MF	Natalie Tobin	Free agent	Free transfer	10 October 2012	
7	MF	Nicola Bolger	Newcastle Jets	Free transfer	10 October 2012	
8	FW	Amy Harrison	Free agent	Free transfer	10 October 2012	
11	MF	(New Zealand) Annalie Longo	(New Zealand) Three Kings United	Free transfer	10 October 2012	
13	FW	Larissa Crummer	Free agent	Free transfer	10 October 2012	
15	DF	(New Zealand) Hannah Bromley	(New Zealand) Glenfield Rovers	Free transfer	10 October 2012	

=== Transfers out ===
No.	Position	Name	To	Type/fee	Date	Ref.
5	DF	(Cameroon) Estelle Johnson	(United States) New York Fury	Free transfer	28 March 2012	
6	MF	Servet Uzunlar	Western Sydney Wanderers	Free transfer	4 October 2012	
9	FW	Sarah Walsh	Western Sydney Wanderers	Free transfer	4 October 2012	
12	DF	Teigen Allen	Western Sydney Wanderers	Free transfer	4 October 2012	
14	MF	Rachael Soutar	Western Sydney Wanderers	Free transfer	4 October 2012	
16	MF	Alisha Bass	Western Sydney Wanderers	Free transfer	4 October 2012	
15	DF	Thea Slatyer	Retired		8 October 2012	
7	MF	Heather Garriock	Free agent	Free transfer	10 October 2012	
10	MF	Kylie Ledbrook	Retired		10 October 2012	

== Competitions ==
=== Overall record ===
Competition	First match	Last match	Starting round	Final position	Record							
Competition	First match	Last match	Starting round	Final position	Pld	W	D	L	GF	GA	GD	Win %
W-League	21 October 2012	12 January 2013	Matchday 1	4th	12	6	2	4	30	24	+6	50.00
W-League Finals	19 January 2013	27 January 2013	Semi-finals	Winners	2	2	0	0	6	4	+2	100.00
Total					14	8	2	4	36	28	+8	57.14

Source: Competitions

=== W-League ===
==== League table ====
Pos	Team	Pld	W	D	L	GF	GA	GD	Pts	Qualification
1	Brisbane Roar	12	8	2	2	28	15	+13	26	Qualification to Finals series
2	Perth Glory	12	7	3	2	34	20	+14	24	Qualification to Finals series
3	Melbourne Victory	12	7	2	3	26	14	+12	23	Qualification to Finals series
4	Sydney FC (C)	12	6	2	4	30	24	+6	20	Qualification to Finals series
5	Canberra United	12	5	3	4	25	20	+5	18	
6	Western Sydney Wanderers	12	4	1	7	19	23	−4	13	
7	Newcastle Jets	12	1	3	8	15	33	−18	6	
8	Adelaide United	12	2	0	10	12	40	−28	6	

Source: au.soccerway.com
Rules for classification: 1) points; 2) goal difference; 3) number of goals scored.
(C) Champions

==== Results summary ====
Overall								Home						Away					
Pld	W	D	L	GF	GA	GD	Pts	W	D	L	GF	GA	GD	W	D	L	GF	GA	GD
12	6	2	4	30	24	+6	20	2	1	3	14	17	−3	4	1	1	16	7	+9

Source: worldfootball.net

==== Results by round ====
Round	1	2	3	4	5	6	7	8	9	10	11	12
Ground	H	H	A	H	A	A	H	A	H	A	H	A
Result	D	W	W	L	L	W	W	D	L	W	L	W
Position	3	3	2	3	5	3	2	2	5	4	5	4
Points	1	4	7	7	7	10	13	14	14	17	17	20

Source: worldfootball.net
A = Away; H = Home; W = Win; D = Draw; L = Loss

==== Matches ====
The league fixtures were announced on 18 September 2012.

Win Draw Loss

21 October 2012 1	Sydney FC	3–3	Newcastle Jets	Sydney
15:00 AEDT	Kennedy 35'; Kerr 75', 77'	Report	van Egmond 17'; Andrews 21'; Huster 58'	Stadium: Leichhardt Oval; Referee: Casey Reibelt

27 October 2012 2	Sydney FC	1–0	Western Sydney Wanderers	Sydney
14:00 AEDT	Kete 29'	Report		Stadium: Leichhardt Oval; Attendance: 841; Referee: Peta McCallum

3 November 2012 3	Brisbane Roar	1–3	Sydney FC	Brisbane
15:00 AEST	Harch 42'	Report	Kerr 46'; Kete 57'; Perry 62'	Stadium: Cleveland Showgrounds; Referee: Kate Jacewicz

11 November 2012 4	Sydney FC	1–2	Melbourne Victory	Sydney
16:45 AEDT	Kennedy 41'	Report	Catley 8'; Spiranovic 81'	Stadium: Leichhardt Oval; Referee: Kirralee Andruschak

17 November 2012 5	Perth Glory	3–1	Sydney FC	Perth
11:00 AWST	Sutton 18', 76', 85'	Report	Logarzo 19'	Stadium: nib Stadium; Attendance: 1,327; Referee: Rebecca Durcau

24 November 2012 6	Adelaide United	0–4	Sydney FC	Adelaide
14:00 ACDT		Report	Rollason 4'; Kete 11'; Logarzo 58', 77'	Stadium: Burton Park; Referee: Renee Silvester

1 December 2012 7	Sydney FC	4–3	Canberra United	Sydney
10:00 AEDT	Simon 4', 77'; Kerr 16'; Kete 90+4'	Report	Yeoman-Dale 32'; Raso 60'; Washington 84'	Stadium: Leichhardt Oval; Referee: Kate Jacewicz

8 December 2012 8	Melbourne Victory	1–1	Sydney FC	Melbourne
16:00 AEDT	Ruyter-Hooley 27'	Report	Foord 4'	Stadium: Wembley Park; Referee: Peta McCallum

15 December 2012 9	Sydney FC	5–7	Perth Glory	Sydney
17:00 AEDT	Simon 41'; Kete 43'; Billson 62'; Foord 81'; Kerr 90'	Report	De Vanna 13', 72', 87'; Luik 56'; D'Ovidio 60', 61'; Gill 87'	Stadium: Allianz Stadium; Referee: Kirralee Gardner

23 December 2012 10	Newcastle Jets	0–4	Sydney FC	Newcastle
16:30 AEDT		Report	Simon 11', 47', 88'; Kennedy 14'	Stadium: Wanderers Oval; Referee: Kelly Jones

5 January 2013 11	Sydney FC	0–2	Brisbane Roar	Sydney
15:00 AEDT		Report	Butt 45+3', 55'	Stadium: Cromer Park; Referee: Katie Patterson

12 January 2013 12	Western Sydney Wanderers	2–3	Sydney FC	Sydney
10:00 AEDT	Fors 30', 74' (pen.)	Report	Foord 9'; Kerr 39'; Bolger 83'	Stadium: Campbelltown Stadium; Referee: Kate Jacewicz

==== Finals series ====
19 January 2013 Semi-finals	Brisbane Roar	2–3	Sydney FC	Brisbane
15:00 AEST	Gielnik 14'; Popovic 75'	Report	Longo 19'; Kerr 29', 61'	Stadium: Queensland Sport and Athletics Centre; Attendance: 1,901; Referee: Peta McCallum

27 January 2013 Grand Final	Melbourne Victory	1–3	Sydney FC	Melbourne
15:30 AEDT	Larsson 41'	Report	Bolger 25'; Kerr 48'; Simon 85' (pen.)	Stadium: AAMI Park; Attendance: 4,181; Referee: Kate Jacewicz

== Statistics ==
=== Appearances and goals ===
Includes all competitions. Players with no appearances not included in the list.

No.	Pos.	Nat.	Name	W-League				Total	
No.	Pos.	Nat.	Name	Regular season		Finals series		Total	
No.	Pos.	Nat.	Name	Apps	Goals	Apps	Goals	Apps	Goals
1	GK	(Australia)	Sian Fryer-McLaren	8	0	0	0	8	0
2	DF	(Australia)	Teresa Polias	12	0	2	0	14	0
3	DF	(Australia)	Elizabeth Ralston	10+2	0	2	0	14	0
4	FW	(Australia)	Sam Kerr	9+1	6	2	3	12	9
5	FW	(Australia)	Meg McLaughlin	0+1	0	0	0	1	0
6	MF	(Australia)	Natalie Tobin	0	0	0+1	0	1	0
7	MF	(Australia)	Nicola Bolger	8+4	1	1+1	1	14	2
8	FW	(Australia)	Amy Harrison	0+1	0	0	0	1	0
9	DF	(Australia)	Caitlin Foord	9+1	3	2	0	12	3
10	DF	(Australia)	Renee Rollason	12	1	2	0	14	1
11	MF	(New Zealand)	Annalie Longo	4+7	0	2	1	13	1
12	FW	(Australia)	Chloe Logarzo	3+8	3	1+1	0	13	3
13	FW	(Australia)	Larissa Crummer	9+3	0	0+1	0	13	0
14	MF	(Australia)	Alanna Kennedy	10	3	2	0	12	3
15	DF	(New Zealand)	Hannah Bromley	2+2	0	0	0	4	0
16	DF	(Australia)	Ellyse Perry	6	1	1	0	7	1
17	FW	(Australia)	Kyah Simon	9	6	2	1	11	7
18	FW	(Australia)	Brittany Whitfield	0+1	0	0+1	0	2	0
19	FW	(New Zealand)	Emma Kete	10+2	5	1	0	13	5
20	GK	(Australia)	Sham Khamis	4	0	2	0	6	0
21	MF	(Australia)	Kylie Ledbrook	0+2	0	0	0	2	0
22	MF	(England)	Lillie Fenlon-Billson	7	1	0	0	7	1

=== Disciplinary record ===
Includes all competitions. The list is sorted by squad number when total cards are equal. Players with no cards not included in the list.

Rank	No.	Pos.	Nat.	Name	W-League						Total		
Rank	No.	Pos.	Nat.	Name	Regular season			Finals series			Total		
Rank	No.	Pos.	Nat.	Name	Booked	(yellow card) (yellow-red card)	Sent off (straight red)	Booked	(yellow card) (yellow-red card)	Sent off (straight red)	Booked	(yellow card) (yellow-red card)	Sent off (straight red)
1	19	FW	(New Zealand)	Emma Kete	0	0	0	0	0	1	0	0	1
2	2	DF	(Australia)	Teresa Polias	2	0	0	0	0	0	2	0	0
3	3	DF	(Australia)	Elizabeth Ralston	1	0	0	0	0	0	1	0	0
3	9	DF	(Australia)	Caitlin Foord	0	0	0	1	0	0	1	0	0
3	10	DF	(Australia)	Rene Rollason	1	0	0	0	0	0	1	0	0
3	14	MF	(Australia)	Alanna Kennedy	0	0	0	1	0	0	1	0	0
3	15	DF	(New Zealand)	Hannah Bromley	1	0	0	0	0	0	1	0	0
3	17	FW	(Australia)	Kyah Simon	0	0	0	1	0	0	1	0	0
3	22	MF	(England)	Lillie Fenlon-Billson	1	0	0	0	0	0	1	0	0
Total					6	0	0	3	0	1	9	0	1

=== Clean sheets ===
Includes all competitions. The list is sorted by squad number when total clean sheets are equal. Numbers in parentheses represent games where both goalkeepers participated and both kept a clean sheet; the number in parentheses is awarded to the goalkeeper who was substituted on, whilst a full clean sheet is awarded to the goalkeeper who was on the field at the start of play. Goalkeepers with no clean sheets not included in the list.

Rank	No.	Nat.	Goalkeeper	W-League		Total
Rank	No.	Nat.	Goalkeeper	Regular season	Finals series	Total
1	1	(Australia)	Sian Fryer-McLaren	2	0	2
2	20	(Australia)	Sham Khamis	1	0	1
Total				3	0	3
