= 2012–13 W-League =

Fifth season of the top women's football (soccer) league in Australia

W-League
- Season: 2012–13
- Champions: Sydney FC (2nd title)
- Premiers: Brisbane Roar (2nd title)
- Matches: 51
- Goals: 157 (3.08 per match)
- Top goalscorer: Kate Gill (11 goals)
- Biggest home win: Canberra United 5 – 0 Western Sydney Wanderers (8 January 2013)
- Biggest away win: Newcastle Jets 0 – 5 Canberra United (27 October 2012); Newcastle Jets 1 – 6 Perth Glory (10 November 2012); Adelaide United 0 – 5 Melbourne Victory (1 December 2012)
- Highest scoring: Sydney FC 5 – 7 Perth Glory (15 December 2012)
- Longest winning run: Brisbane Roar (4)
- Longest unbeaten run: Brisbane Roar (7)
- Longest winless run: Adelaide United (7); Newcastle Jets (7)
- Longest losing run: Adelaide United (7)

The 2012–13 W-League season was the fifth season of the W-League, the Australian national women's football (soccer) competition. The season consisted of twelve matchdays followed by a finals series.

This season saw the addition of a new team, the Western Sydney Wanderers, to the W-League (paralleling the club also fielding new teams in the A-League and Youth League) bringing the competition back up to eight teams. This means each matchday involved all eight teams, resulting in the regular season increasing from ten games to twelve for each team.

== Clubs ==
Season announcement W-League teams for the 2012–13 season:

Team	City	Years in competition
Adelaide United	(South Australia) Adelaide, SA	2008–09 — present
Brisbane Roar	(Queensland) Brisbane, Qld	2008–09 — present
Canberra United	(Australian Capital Territory) Canberra, ACT	2008–09 — present
Melbourne Victory	(Victoria (state)) Melbourne, Vic	2008–09 — present
Newcastle Jets	(New South Wales) Newcastle, NSW	2008–09 — present
Perth Glory	(Western Australia) Perth, WA	2008–09 — present
Sydney FC	(New South Wales) Sydney, NSW	2008–09 — present
Western Sydney Wanderers	(New South Wales) Sydney, NSW	2012–13 — present

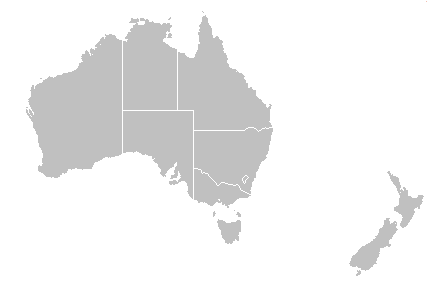

=== Personnel and kits ===
Team	Manager	Captain	Kit manufacturer
Adelaide United	(England) David Edmondson	(New Zealand) Abby Erceg	Adidas
Brisbane Roar	(Australia) Belinda Wilson	(Australia) Clare Polkinghorne	Puma
Canberra United	(Czech Republic) Jitka Klimkova	(Australia) Ellie Brush	Hummel
Melbourne Victory	(England) Mike Mulvey	(Australia) Stephanie Catley	Adidas
Newcastle Jets	(Australia) Wayne O'Sullivan	(Australia) Hayley Crawford	ISC
Perth Glory	(Australia) Jamie Harnwell	(Australia) Collette McCallum	Kelme
Sydney FC	(Australia) Alen Stajcic	(Australia) Kyah Simon	Adidas
Western Sydney Wanderers	(Australia) Stephen Roche	(Australia) Sarah Walsh	Nike

=== Foreign players ===
Club	Visa 1	Visa 2	Visa 3	Non-Visa foreigner(s)	Former player(s)
Adelaide United	(New Zealand) Abby Erceg	(New Zealand) Sarah McLaughlin	(New Zealand) Holly Patterson	(England) Kristy Moore^{A}	
Brisbane Roar	(England) Hannah Beard	(Japan) Hoshimi Kishi	(Japan) Sachiko Tatsuoka		
Canberra United	(Germany) Ariane Hingst	(United States) Kristen Mewis			(United States) Nikki Washington
Melbourne Victory	(Sweden) Petra Larsson	(United States) Danielle Johnson	(United States) Jessica McDonald	(New Zealand) Rebekah Stott^{A} (Turkey) Gülcan Koca^{A} (Wales) Jess Fishlock^{G}	
Newcastle Jets	(United States) Tiffany Boshers	(United States) Tori Huster	(United States) Angela Salem	(England) Stacey Day^{B} (England) Mikaela Howell^{B}	
Perth Glory	(Canada) Sasha Andrews	(England) Carly Telford	(New Zealand) Elizabeth Milne	(Wales) Carys Hawkins^{A} (United States) Kaitlyn Savage^{R}	
Sydney FC	(New Zealand) Hannah Bromley	(New Zealand) Emma Kete		(New Zealand) Annalie Longo^{A}	
Western Sydney Wanderers	(Iceland) Þóra Björg Helgadóttir	(Sweden) Louise Fors		(England) Lizzie Durack^{A}	

The following do not fill a Visa position:
^{A} Australian citizens who have chosen to represent another national team;
^{B} Those players who were born and started their professional career abroad but have since gained Australian citizenship;
^{G} Guest players;
^{R} Injury replacement players, or national team replacement players;

== Regular season ==
=== League table ===
Pos	Team	Pld	W	D	L	GF	GA	GD	Pts	Qualification
1	Brisbane Roar	12	8	2	2	28	15	+13	26	Qualification to Finals series
2	Perth Glory	12	7	3	2	34	20	+14	24	Qualification to Finals series
3	Melbourne Victory	12	7	2	3	26	14	+12	23	Qualification to Finals series
4	Sydney FC (C)	12	6	2	4	30	24	+6	20	Qualification to Finals series
5	Canberra United	12	5	3	4	25	20	+5	18	
6	Western Sydney Wanderers	12	4	1	7	19	23	−4	13	
7	Newcastle Jets	12	1	3	8	15	33	−18	6	
8	Adelaide United	12	2	0	10	12	40	−28	6	

Source: au.soccerway.com
Rules for classification: 1) points; 2) goal difference; 3) number of goals scored.
(C) Champions

=== Matches ===
==== Round 1 ====
20 October 2012	Canberra United	0–0	Brisbane Roar	McKellar Park, Canberra
14:00 AEDT		report		Referee: Kate Jacewicz

20 October 2012	Adelaide United	4–3	Western Sydney Wanderers	Burton Park, Adelaide
14:00 ACDT	Quigley 34’ Sarah McLaughlin 77’, 80’, 88’	report	Servet Uzunlar 6’, 21’ Jenna Kingsley 55’	Referee: Catherine Hofmann

21 October 2012	Perth Glory	2–0	Melbourne Victory	Intiga Stadium, Perth
10:30 AWST	Kate Gill 75’ Marianna Tabain 88’	report		Referee: Kirralee Gardener

21 October 2012	Sydney FC	3–3	Newcastle Jets	Leichhardt Oval, Sydney
15:00 AEDT	Alanna Kennedy 35’ Samantha Kerr 75’, 77’	report	Emily van Egmond 17’ Tara Andrews 21’ Tori Huster 58’	Referee: Casey Reibelt

==== Round 2 ====
27 October 2012	Sydney FC	1–0	Western Sydney Wanderers	Leichhardt Oval, Sydney
14:00 AEDT	Emma Kete 29’	report		Referee: Peta McCallum

27 October 2012	Newcastle Jets	0–5	Canberra United	Wanderers Oval, Newcastle
14:00 AEDT		report	Hayley Raso 74’ Michelle Heyman 84’ Ariane Hingst 86’ Caitlin Munoz 87’ Ashleigh Sykes 90’+5	Referee: Kirralee Gardener

27 October 2012	Perth Glory	2–1	Adelaide United	Intiga Stadium, Perth
15:00 AWST	Kate Gill 45’+2; Elisa D'Ovidio 88’	report	Ann Mayo 44’	Referee: Renee Silvester

27 October 2012	Melbourne Victory	0–1	Brisbane Roar	Veneto Club, Melbourne
16:00 AEDT		report	Vedrana Popovic 17’	Referee: Rebecca Durcau

==== Round 3 ====
3 November 2012	Melbourne Victory	1–0	Newcastle Jets	Simonds Stadium, Geelong
14:00 AEDT	Rebekah Stott 45’	report		Referee: Katie Patterson

3 November 2012	Western Sydney Wanderers	2–0	Perth Glory	Campbelltown Stadium, Sydney
14:00 AEDT	Trudy Camilleri 43’, 61’	report		Referee: Alison Logue

3 November 2012	Brisbane Roar	1–3	Sydney FC	Cleveland Showgrounds, Cleveland
15:00 AEST	Lana Harch 44’	report	Samantha Kerr 47’ Emma Kete 58’ Ellyse Perry 62’	Referee: Kate Jacewicz

3 November 2012	Canberra United	3–1	Adelaide United	McKellar Park, Canberra
16:00 AEDT	Caitlin Cooper 72’ Ellie Brush 78’ Samantha Wood 84’	report	Racheal Quigley 38’	Referee: Casey Reibelt

==== Round 4 ====
10 November 2012	Adelaide United	0–2	Brisbane Roar	Hindmarsh Stadium, Adelaide
13:30 ACDT		report	Amy Chapman 9’ Elise Kellond-Knight 63’ (pen)	Referee: Rebecca Durcau

10 November 2012	Newcastle Jets	1–6	Perth Glory	Wanderers Oval, Newcastle
16:30 AEDT	Tori Huster 73’	report	Lisa De Vanna 4’ Collette McCallum 19’ Kate Gill 58’, 62’, 90’+2 (pen); Marianna Tabain 68’	Referee: Peta McCallum

11 November 2012	Western Sydney Wanderers	1–1	Canberra United	Campbelltown Stadium, Sydney
14:00 AEDT	Teigen Allen 23’	report	Caitlin Munoz 73’	Referee: Kate Jacewicz

11 November 2012	Sydney FC	1–2	Melbourne Victory	Leichhardt Oval, Sydney
16:45 AEDT	Alanna Kennedy 41’	report	Amy Jackson 8’ Laura Špiranović 81’	Referee: Kirralee Gardner

==== Round 5 ====
17 November 2012	Perth Glory	3–1	Sydney FC	nib Stadium, Perth
11:00 AWST	Rosie Sutton 18’, 76’, 85’	report	Chloe Logarzo 19’	Referee: Rebecca Durcau

17 November 2012	Melbourne Victory	3–0	Canberra United	Wembley Park, Melbourne
15:00 AEDT	Jessica Fishlock 28’ Jessica McDonald 44’ Enza Barilla 70’	report		Attendance: 574; Referee: Casey Reibelt

17 November 2012	Brisbane Roar	1–2	Western Sydney Wanderers	Cleveland Showgrounds, Cleveland
15:00 AEST	Amy Chapman 49’	report	Catherine Cannuli 7’, 56’	Referee: Katie Patterson

17 November 2012	Newcastle Jets	4–0	Adelaide United	Wanderers Oval, Newcastle
16:30 AEDT	Tara Andrews 8’ Angela Salem 39’ (pen); Kate Hensman 51’ Tori Huster 66’	report		Referee: Lee Corey

==== Round 6 ====
24 November 2012	Brisbane Roar	3–2	Melbourne Victory	QSAC, Brisbane
10:00 AEST	Amy Chapman 19’, 89’ Ashley Spina 90+5’	report	Laura Špiranović 72’ Jessica McDonald 90+2’	Referee: Peta McCallum

24 November 2012	Adelaide United	0–4	Sydney FC	Burton Park, Adelaide
14:00 ACDT		report	Renee Rollason 4’ Emma Kete 11’ Chloe Logarzo 58’, 77’	Referee: Renee Silvester

24 November 2012	Western Sydney Wanderers	3–0	Newcastle Jets	Campbelltown Stadium, Sydney
14:00 AEDT	Sarah Walsh 23’, 53; Candace Sciberras 90+3'	report		Referee: Kate Jacewicz

5 December 2012	Canberra United	2–1	Perth Glory	Deakin Football Stadium, Canberra
18:00 AEDT	Caitlin Munoz 5' (pen); Nikki Washington 53'	report	Rosie Sutton 9'	Referee: Peta McCallum

==== Round 7 ====
1 December 2012	Sydney FC	4–3	Canberra United	Leichhardt Oval, Sydney
10:00 AEDT	Kyah Simon 5’, 76’ (pen); Samantha Kerr 18’ Emma Kete 90+4’	report	Georgia Yeoman-Dale 33’ Hayley Raso 58’ Nikki Washington 83’	Referee: Kate Jacewicz

1 December 2012	Adelaide United	0–5	Melbourne Victory	Burton Park, Adelaide
14:00 ACDT		report	Laura Spiranovic 8’ Jessica McDonald 38’, 42’ Enza Barilla 49’ Stephanie Catley 90’	Referee: Kelly Jones

1 December 2012	Perth Glory	3–0	Western Sydney Wanderers	Intiga Stadium, Perth
16:00 AWST	Marianna Tabain 17’ Kate Gill 25’ Collette McCallum 59’	report		Referee: Renee Silvester

2 December 2012	Newcastle Jets	2–3	Brisbane Roar	Wanderers Oval, Newcastle
14:00 AEDT	Tori Huster 16’ Gema Simon 69’	report	Amy Chapman 54’ Emily Gielnik 62’ Clare Polkinghorne 80’	Referee: Katie Patterson

==== Round 8 ====
8 December 2012	Brisbane Roar	2–2	Perth Glory	QSAC, Brisbane
10:00 AEST	Tameka Butt 61’ Katrina Gorry 86’	report	Kate Gill 35’ Marianna Tabain 45’	Referee: Kirralee Gardener

8 December 2012	Western Sydney Wanderers	4–0	Adelaide United	Campbelltown Stadium, Sydney
14:00 AEDT	Louise Fors 6’, 67’ Sarah Walsh 8’ Servet Uzunlar 40’	report		Referee: Lara Smith

8 December 2012	Canberra United	1–0	Newcastle Jets	Deakin Football Stadium, Canberra
16:00 AEDT	Nicole Sykes 34’	report		Referee: Rebecca Durcau

8 December 2012	Melbourne Victory	1–1	Sydney FC	Wembley Park, Melbourne
16:00 AEDT	Maika Ruyter-Hooley 27’	report	Caitlin Foord 4'	Referee: Peta McCallum

==== Round 9 ====
15 December 2012	Canberra United	1–2	Melbourne Victory	McKellar Park, Canberra
14:00 AEDT	Jennifer Bisset 50’	report	Amy Jackson 31’ Jessica Fishlock 90+4’	Referee: Casey Reibelt

15 December 2012	Adelaide United	2–0	Newcastle Jets	Burton Park, Adelaide
16:00 ACDT	Kristy Moore 67’ Ruth Wallace 70’	report		Referee: Katie Patterson

15 December 2012	Sydney FC	5–7	Perth Glory	Allianz Stadium, Sydney
17:00 AEDT	Kyah Simon 41’ Emma Kete 43’ Lillie Billson 62’ Caitlin Foord 81’ Samantha Kerr 90+2’	report	Lisa De Vanna 13’, 72’, 87’ Aivi Luik 56’ Elisa D'Ovidio 60’, 61’ Kate Gill 87’	Referee: Kirralee Gardner

16 December 2012	Western Sydney Wanderers	1–2	Brisbane Roar	Campbelltown Stadium, Sydney
15:00 AEDT	Louise Fors 68’	report	Tameka Butt 21’ Emily Gielnik 27’	Referee: Catherine Hoffmann

==== Round 10 ====
22 December 2012	Melbourne Victory	3–1	Western Sydney Wanderers	Wembley Park, Melbourne
14:00 AEDT	Petra Larsson 10’ Jessica McDonald 52’, 90’	report	Vanessa Hart 2’	Referee: Casey Reibelt

22 December 2012	Brisbane Roar	6–2	Adelaide United	A.J. Kelly Park, Redcliffe
15:00 AEST	Amy Chapman 20’ Emily Gielnik 23’, 35’, 90+3’ Vedrana Popovic 58’ Tameka Butt 61’	report	Kristy Moore 65’ Racheal Quigley 77’	Referee: Peta McCallum

22 December 2012	Perth Glory	3–3	Canberra United	Intiga Stadium, Perth
16:00 AWST	Aivi Luik 33’ Elizabeth Milne 35’ Lisa De Vanna 49’	report	Nikki Washington 24’ Hayley Raso 44’ Caitlin Cooper 71’	Referee: Kate Jacewicz

23 December 2012	Newcastle Jets	0–4	Sydney FC	Wanderers Oval, Newcastle
16:30 AEDT		report	Kyah Simon 11’, 47’, 87’ Alanna Kennedy 14’	Referee: Kelly Jones

==== Round 11 ====
5 January 2013	Sydney FC	0–2	Brisbane Roar	Cromer Park, Sydney
15:00 AEDT		report	Tameka Butt 45+3’, 55’	Referee: Katie Patterson

5 January 2013	Melbourne Victory	4–1	Adelaide United	Wembley Park, Melbourne
16:00 AEDT	Danielle Johnson 2’ Petra Larsson 6’ Jessica McDonald 14’ Laura Špiranović 57’	report	Sarah McLaughlin 87’	Referee: Kiralee Gardener

5 January 2013	Perth Glory	2–2	Newcastle Jets	Intiga Stadium, Perth
16:00 AWST	Rosie Sutton 22’ Kate Gill 56’	report	Emily van Egmond 3’ Jasmin Courtenay 77’	Attendance: 736; Referee: Catherine Hoffman

8 January 2013	Canberra United	5–0	Western Sydney Wanderers	McKellar Park, Canberra
19:00 AEDT	Ellie Brush 34’ Michelle Heyman 44’ Caitlin Munoz 74’ Vanessa Hart 82’(o.g.); Kristen Mewis 89’	report		Attendance: 712; Referee: Rebecca Durcau

==== Round 12 ====
12 January 2013	Adelaide United	1–3	Perth Glory	Burton Park, Adelaide
10:00 ACDT	Racheal Quigley 52’	report	Kate Gill 18’, 65’ Marianna Tabain 86’	Referee: Kelly Jones

12 January 2013	Western Sydney Wanderers	2–3	Sydney FC	Campbelltown Stadium, Sydney
10:30 AEDT	Louise Fors 30’, 74(pen)	report	Caitlin Foord 3’ Samantha Kerr 39’ Nicola Bolger 83’	Referee: Kate Jacewicz

12 January 2013	Brisbane Roar	5–1	Canberra United	QSAC, Brisbane
14:00 AEST	Katrina Gorry 11’ Tameka Butt 38’, 41’, 70’ Emily Gielnik 65’	report	Kristen Mewis 45’	Referee: Katie Patterson

13 January 2013	Newcastle Jets	3–3	Melbourne Victory	Wanderers Oval, Newcastle
16:30 AEDT	Jasmin Courtenay 40’ Emily van Egmond 42’, 84’(pen)	report	Amy Jackson 3’ Enza Barilla 30’ Hayley Crawford 60’(own)	Referee: Lara Smith

== Finals series ==
=== Semi-finals ===
19 January 2013	Brisbane Roar	2–3	Sydney FC	QSAC, Brisbane
15:00 AEDT	Gielnik 14'; V. Popovic 75'	report	Longo 19'; Kerr 29', 61'	Attendance: 1,901; Referee: Kirralee Gardener

20 January 2013	Perth Glory	1–1 (a.e.t.) (3–4 p)	Melbourne Victory	nib Stadium, Perth
13:00 AWST	McCallum 56'	report	L. Špiranović 52'	Attendance: 1,589; Referee: Katie Patterson
	Penalties
	McCallum (penalty scored); Gill (penalty scored); Luik (penalty missed); R. Sutton (penalty missed); De Vanna (penalty scored)		(penalty scored) Johnson; (penalty missed) Friend; (penalty scored) P. Larsson; (penalty scored) Koca; (penalty scored) McDonald

=== Grand final ===
27 January 2013	Melbourne Victory	1–3	Sydney FC	AAMI Park, Melbourne
15:30 AEDT	P. Larsson 41'	Report	Bolger 25'; Kerr 48'; K. Simon 86' (pen.)	Attendance: 4,181; Referee: Kate Jacewicz

== Season statistics ==
=== Leading goalscorers ===
Total	Player		Team	Goals per Round											
Total	Player		Team	1	2	3	4	5	6	7	8	9	10	11	12
11	(Australia)	Kate Gill	Perth Glory	1	1		3			1	1	1		1	2
8	(Australia)	Tameka Butt	Brisbane Roar								1	1	1	2	3
7	(United States)	Jessica McDonald	Melbourne Victory					1	1	2			2	1	
6	(Australia)	Amy Chapman	Brisbane Roar				1	1	2	1			1		
6	(Australia)	Emily Gielnik	Brisbane Roar							1		1	3		1
6	(Australia)	Sam Kerr	Sydney FC	2		1				1		1			1
6	(Australia)	Kyah Simon	Sydney FC							2		1	3		
5	(Australia)	Lisa De Vanna	Perth Glory				1					3	1		
5	(Sweden)	Louise Fors	Western Sydney Wanderers								2	1			2
5	(New Zealand)	Emma Kete	Sydney FC		1	1			1	1		1			
5	(Australia)	Marianna Tabain	Perth Glory	1			1			1	1				1

Goal scored from penalty kick

== International competition ==
The winners of the 2011–12 season Canberra United participated in the 2012 International Women's Club Championship, known as the Mobcast Cup for sponsorship reasons, the first edition of this tournament hosted by the JFA.

Canberra United finished in fourth place (out of four teams), suffering two losses.

== See also ==
- 2012–13 Adelaide United W-League season
- 2012–13 Western Sydney Wanderers W-League season
