= Lizzie Durack =

English footballer

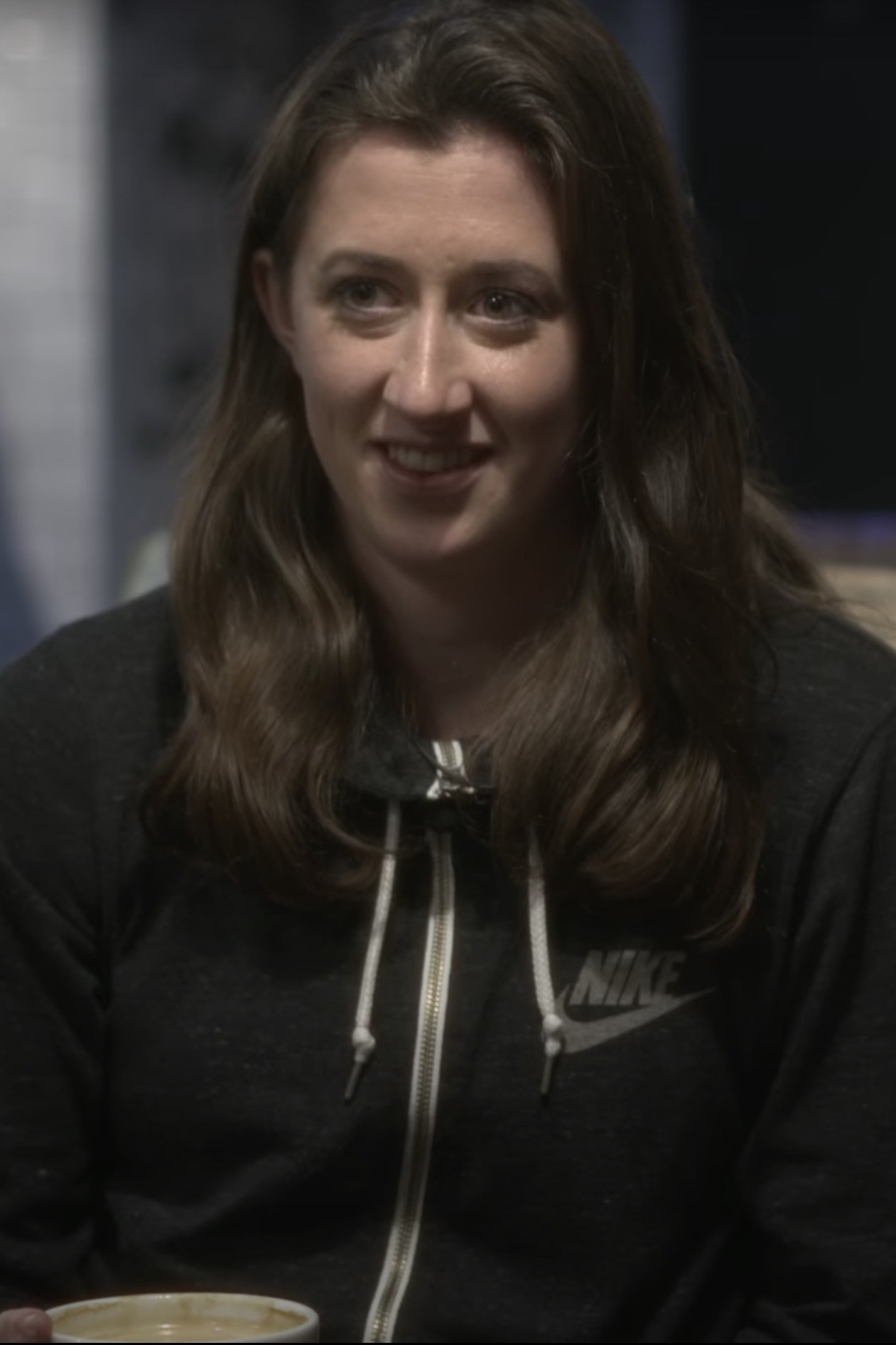
- Durack in 2018

Personal information
- Full name: Elizabeth Christina Mary Durack
- Date of birth: 20 May 1994 (age 32)
- Place of birth: Sydney, Australia
- Height: 1.73 m (5 ft 8 in)
- Position: Goalkeeper

Youth career
- North West Sydney Koalas

College career
Years	Team	Apps	(Gls)
2013–2016	Harvard Crimson	40	(0)

Senior career*
Years	Team	Apps	(Gls)
2012–2013	Western Sydney Wanderers	5	(0)
2013	Everton	10	(0)
2017–2018	Everton	11	(0)
2018–2019	Chelsea	0	(0)

International career^{‡}
2010	Australia U17		
2013	England U19	5	(0)
2014	England U20	3	(0)
2014–2016	England U23		
2014	England	1	(0)
- * Club domestic league appearances and goals as of 8 January 2018 ‡ National team caps and goals as of 9 July 2016

Elizabeth Christina Mary Durack (born 20 May 1994) is a former professional footballer who last played as a goalkeeper for Chelsea of the FA Women's Super League.

== Early life ==
Durack was born in Australia, to an English mother. She was the only girl on her school's team.

== College career ==
In 2013, Durack took up a place at Harvard University to study human development regenerative biology and play for the Harvard Crimson soccer team.

== Club career ==
=== Western Sydney Wanderers ===
Durack played alongside Chloe Logarzo for five years at the North West Sydney Koalas, and played on an Australian under-19 schoolgirl team which toured Britain and Ireland in 2012. In the 2012–13 W-League season, Durack played for expansion team Western Sydney Wanderers. She was back-up goalkeeper to Þóra Björg Helgadóttir.

=== Everton ===
When Durack travelled to England to train with the England women's national under-19 football team in early 2013, the Football Association found her a place at Everton, where she understudied experienced but injury-prone veteran Rachel Brown.

=== Notts County ===
In June 2016 Durack joined Notts County. The Lady Pies were in the market for a goalkeeper after their first choice Carly Telford suffered torn ankle ligaments a few days previously. A month later, she was deemed ineligible due to NCAA rules.

=== Return to Everton ===
After graduating from Harvard Durack re-signed for Everton in July 2017.

=== Chelsea ===
On 8 June 2018, Durack signed for Chelsea. She announced her retirement from professional football in 2019.

== International career ==
Durack attended the New South Wales Institute of Sport and was a member of the Australia women's national under-17 soccer team, before the coach rejected her as not good enough for international level.

Later the English Football Association e-mailed Harvard University asking for details of any players who were eligible for their women's national teams. As Durack's mother was born and raised in Doncaster, her name was put forward and she was invited to try out for the England women's national under-19 football team.

She was named as one of ten "emerging talents" by UEFA after helping England reach the final of the 2013 UEFA Women's Under-19 Championship. At the 2014 Cyprus Cup, England's senior national team coach Mark Sampson gave Durack her first cap in a six-minute substitute appearance in a 3–0 win over Finland.

Later that year she played in all three of England under-20's matches at the 2014 FIFA U-20 Women's World Cup in Canada. In June 2016, Durack played for the England women's national under-23 football team against the United States.

Durack received one cap at senior level for England. She was allotted 185 when the FA announced their legacy numbers scheme to honour the 50th anniversary of England’s inaugural international.

== Retirement and later life ==
Durack retired in September 2019 to work at Goldman Sachs.
