= 2012–13 in Australian soccer =

Soccer in Australia
- Season: 2012–13

Men's soccer
- A-League Premiership: Western Sydney Wanderers
- A-League Championship: Central Coast Mariners
- National Youth League: Melbourne Victory

Women's soccer
- W-League Premiership: Brisbane Roar
- W-League Championship: Sydney FC

The 2012–13 season was the 44th season of national competitive soccer in Australia and 130th overall.

== Domestic leagues ==
=== A-League ===
==== Regular season ====
Pos	Team	Pld	W	D	L	GF	GA	GD	Pts	Qualification
1	Western Sydney Wanderers	27	18	3	6	41	21	+20	57	Qualification for 2014 AFC Champions League group stage and finals series
2	Central Coast Mariners (C)	27	16	6	5	48	22	+26	54	Qualification for 2014 AFC Champions League group stage and finals series
3	Melbourne Victory	27	13	5	9	48	45	+3	44	Qualification for 2014 AFC Champions League qualifying play-off and finals series (Note: Since the winner of 2013 A-League Grand Final (Central Coast Mariners) qualified for the 2014 AFC Champions League group stage, the 3rd placed team qualified for the qualifying play-off of 2014 AFC Champions League.)
4	Adelaide United	27	12	5	10	38	37	+1	41	Qualification for Finals series
5	Brisbane Roar	27	10	5	12	33	29	+4	35	Qualification for Finals series
6	Perth Glory	27	9	5	13	29	31	−2	32	Qualification for Finals series
7	Sydney FC	27	9	5	13	41	51	−10	32	
8	Newcastle Jets	27	8	7	12	30	45	−15	31	
9	Melbourne Heart	27	8	3	16	31	40	−9	27	
10	Wellington Phoenix (Note: Wellington Phoenix cannot qualify for the AFC Champions League as they are not recognised as an AFC club.)	27	7	6	14	31	49	−18	27	

Updated to match(es) played on 30 March 2013. Source: ultimatealeague.com
Rules for classification: 1) points; 2) goal difference; 3) number of goals scored.
(C) Champions

==== Finals ====
Elimination Finals
Adelaide United	1
Brisbane Roar	2
Melbourne Victory (a.e.t.)	2
Perth Glory	1

Semi-finals
Western Sydney Wanderers	2
Brisbane Roar	0
Central Coast Mariners	1
Melbourne Victory	0

Grand Final
Western Sydney Wanderers	0
Central Coast Mariners	2

=== W-League ===
==== Regular season ====
Pos	Team	Pld	W	D	L	GF	GA	GD	Pts	Qualification
1	Brisbane Roar	12	8	2	2	28	15	+13	26	Qualification to Finals series
2	Perth Glory	12	7	3	2	34	20	+14	24	Qualification to Finals series
3	Melbourne Victory	12	7	2	3	26	14	+12	23	Qualification to Finals series
4	Sydney FC (C)	12	6	2	4	30	24	+6	20	Qualification to Finals series
5	Canberra United	12	5	3	4	25	20	+5	18	
6	Western Sydney Wanderers	12	4	1	7	19	23	−4	13	
7	Newcastle Jets	12	1	3	8	15	33	−18	6	
8	Adelaide United	12	2	0	10	12	40	−28	6	

Source: au.soccerway.com
Rules for classification: 1) points; 2) goal difference; 3) number of goals scored.
(C) Champions

==== Finals ====
Semifinals
2	Perth Glory	1 (3)
3	Melbourne Victory (p)	1 (4)
1	Brisbane Roar	2
4	Sydney FC	3

Finals
Melbourne Victory	1
Sydney FC	3

=== National Youth League ===
Pos	Team	Pld	W	D	L	GF	GA	GD	Pts
1	Melbourne Victory Youth (C)	18	12	1	5	57	20	+37	37
2	Central Coast Mariners Academy	18	12	1	5	38	28	+10	37
3	Newcastle Jets Youth	18	10	1	7	54	36	+18	31
4	Brisbane Roar Youth	18	9	3	6	39	34	+5	30
5	Perth Glory Youth	18	8	1	9	45	45	0	25
6	Melbourne Heart Youth	18	8	1	9	32	34	−2	25
7	Western Sydney Wanderers Youth	18	7	4	7	29	41	−12	25
8	Adelaide United Youth	18	6	4	8	35	42	−7	22
9	Sydney FC Youth	18	6	3	9	41	46	−5	21
10	AIS Football Program	18	2	1	15	23	58	−35	7

Source: au.soccerway.com
Rules for classification: 1) points; 2) goal difference; 3) number of goals scored.
(C) Champions

== International club competitions ==
=== AFC Champions League ===
==== Brisbane Roar ====
Brisbane Roar qualified for a playoff spot as winners of the 2012 A-League Grand Final.

13 February 2013 Qualifying play-off	Buriram United (Thailand)	0–0 (a.e.t.) (3–0 p)	(Australia) Brisbane Roar	Buriram, Thailand
18:00 UTC+7		Report		Stadium: New I-Mobile Stadium; Attendance: 14,482; Referee: Kim Dong-Jin (South Korea)
	Penalties
	Osmar (penalty scored); Chappuis (penalty scored); Jirawat (penalty scored)		(penalty missed) Broich; (penalty missed) Berisha; (penalty missed) Meyer

==== Central Coast Mariners ====
Central Coast Mariners entered in the Group stage as 2011–12 A-League Premiers.

27 February 2013 Group stage	Central Coast Mariners (Australia)	0–0	(South Korea) Suwon Samsung Bluewings	Gosford, Australia
19:00 AEST (UTC+11)		Report; Summary		Stadium: Bluetongue Stadium; Attendance: 4,529; Referee: Ali Abdulnabi (Bahrain)

13 March 2013 Group stage	Kashiwa Reysol (Japan)	3–1	(Australia) Central Coast Mariners	Kashiwa, Japan
21:00 AEST (UTC+11)	Leandro Domingues 21', 88'; Kano 67'	Report; Summary	Zwaanswijk 8'	Stadium: Hitachi Kashiwa Soccer Stadium; Attendance: 6,472; Referee: Ali Al-Badwawi (UAE)

3 April 2013 Group stage	Central Coast Mariners (Australia)	2–1	(China) Guizhou Renhe	Gosford, Australia
19:00 AEST (UTC+11)	Bojić 50'; Sainsbury 80'	Report	Ryan 71' (o.g.)	Stadium: Bluetongue Stadium; Referee: Abdullah Balideh (Qatar)

9 April 2013 Group stage	Guizhou Renhe (China)	2–1	(Australia) Central Coast Mariners	Guiyang, China
21:30 AEST (UTC+10)	Muslimović 84'; Qu Bo 86'	Report	Duke 43' (pen.)	Stadium: Guiyang Olympic Sports Center; Referee: Abdulla Hassan Mohamed (United Arab Emirates)

23 April 2013 Group stage	Suwon Samsung Bluewings (South Korea)	0–1	(Australia) Central Coast Mariners	Suwon, South Korea
20:30 AEST (UTC+10)		[ Summary]	McGlinchey 81'	Stadium: Suwon World Cup Stadium; Referee: Marai Al Awaji (Saudi Arabia)

30 April 2013 Group stage	Central Coast Mariners (Australia)	0–3	(Japan) Kashiwa Reysol	Gosford, Australia
20:30 AEST (UTC+10)		Report	Kudo 59'; Cléo 79'; Domingues 85'	Stadium: Bluetongue Stadium; Referee: Valentin Kovalenko (Uzbekistan)

15 May 2013 Round of 16	Central Coast Mariners (Australia)	1–2	(China) Guangzhou Evergrande	Gosford, Australia
19:30 AEST (UTC+10)	Duke 7'	Report	Barrios 28'; Muriqui 76'	Stadium: Bluetongue Stadium; Attendance: 8,953; Referee: Abdul Malik Abdul Bashir (Singapore)

22 May 2013 Round of 16	Guangzhou Evergrande (China)	3–0 (5–1 agg.)	(Australia) Central Coast Mariners	Guangzhou, China
22:00 AEST (UTC+10)	Muriqui 7'; Conca 45+1' (pen.); Gao Lin 68'	Report		Stadium: Tianhe Stadium; Attendance: 39,564; Referee: Abdulrahman Abdou (Qatar)

=== International Women's Club Championship ===
The winners of the 2011–12 season Canberra United participated in the 2012 International Women's Club Championship, known as the Mobcast Cup for sponsorship reasons, the first edition of this tournament hosted by the JFA.

Canberra United finished in fourth place (out of four teams), suffering two losses.

== National teams ==
=== Men's senior ===
==== Friendlies ====
16 August 2012	Scotland	3–1	Australia	Edinburgh, Scotland
03:00 UTC+8	Rhodes 29'; Davidson 63' (o.g.); McCormack 76'	Summary	Bresciano 18'	Stadium: Easter Road; Attendance: 11,110; Referee: Tom Hagen (Norway)

7 September 2012	Lebanon	0–3	Australia	Sidon, Lebanon
01:30 UTC+8		Summary	Cahill 20'; McKay 23'; Thompson 88'	Stadium: Saida Municipal Stadium; Attendance: 7,000; Referee: Konstantinos Nikolaidis (Greece)

14 November 2012	South Korea	1–2	Australia	Hwaseong, South Korea
18:00 UTC+8	Lee Dong-Gook 12'	Summary	Rukavytsya 44'; Cornthwaite 88'	Stadium: Hwaseong Stadium; Referee: Wang Zhe (China)

6 February 2013	Australia	2–3	Romania	Marbella, Spain
07:00 UTC+11	Wilkshire 44' (pen.); Cornthwaite 53'	Summary	Tănase 34'; Torje 79'; Stancu 83'	Stadium: Estadio Municipal de Marbella; Attendance: 1,000; Referee: Carlos Velasco Carballo (Spain)

==== EAFF East Asian Cup ====
3 December 2012 Preliminary round 2	Hong Kong	0–1	Australia	Hong Kong
20:30 UTC+8	Lam Hok Hei (yellow card) 88' (yellow-red card) 90'	Report	Emerton 85'	Stadium: Mong Kok Stadium; Attendance: 4,160; Referee: Jumpei Iida (Japan)

5 December 2012 Preliminary round 2	North Korea	1–1	Australia	Hong Kong
20:30 UTC+8	Yong-Hak 64'	Report	Thompson 4'	Stadium: Hong Kong Stadium; Attendance: 989; Referee: Mongkolchai Pechsri (Thailand)

7 December 2012 Preliminary round 2	Guam	0–9	Australia	Hong Kong
17:50 UTC+8		Report	Mooy 12'; Babalj 20', 56'; Marrone 43'; Thompson 59', 63', 65' (pen.); Milligan 71'; Garcia 83'	Stadium: Hong Kong Stadium; Referee: Wang Zhe (China PR)

9 December 2012 Preliminary round 2	Australia	8–0	Chinese Taipei	Hong Kong
17:00 UTC+8	Garcia 11'; Cornthwaite 17'; Taggart 20', 29'; Behich 34', 57'; Mooy 47'; Yang Chao-hsun 82' (o.g.)	Report		Stadium: Hong Kong Stadium; Referee: Kim Dae-Yong (Korea Republic)

==== World Cup qualifying ====
12 September 2012 Fourth round	Jordan	2–1	Australia	Amman, Jordan
00:00 UTC+8	Abdel-Fattah 50' (pen.); Deeb 73'	Summary	Thompson 85'	Stadium: Amman International Stadium; Referee: Abdullah Balideh (Qatar)

16 October 2012 Fourth round	Iraq	1–2	Australia	Doha, Qatar
22:15 UTC+8	Abdul-Zahra 72'	Summary	Cahill 80'; Thompson 84'	Stadium: Grand Hamad Stadium; Referee: Lee Min-Hu (Korea Republic)

26 March 2013 Fourth round	Australia	2–2	Oman	Sydney, Australia
20:00 UTC+10	Cahill 52'; Holman 85'	Report	Al-Muqbali 7'; Jedinak 49' (o.g.)	Stadium: Stadium Australia; Attendance: 34,603; Referee: Ravshan Irmatov (Uzbekistan)

4 June 2013 Fourth round	Japan	1–1	Australia	Saitama, Japan
20:30 UTC+10	Honda 90+1' (pen.)	Report	Oar 82'	Stadium: Saitama Stadium; Attendance: 62,172; Referee: Nawaf Shukralla (Bahrain)

11 June 2013 Fourth round	Australia	4–0	Jordan	Melbourne, Australia
19:00 UTC+10	Bresciano 15'; Cahill 61'; Kruse 76'; Neill 84'	Report		Stadium: Docklands Stadium; Attendance: 43,785; Referee: Abdul Malik Abdul Bashir (Singapore)

18 June 2013 Fourth round	Australia	1–0	Iraq	Sydney, Australia
22:15 UTC+8	Kennedy 83'	Report		Stadium: Stadium Australia; Attendance: 80,523; Referee: Alireza Faghani (Iran)

=== Men's under-20 ===
==== Friendlies ====
29 August 2012	Hong Kong	0–3	Australia	Hong Kong
		Report	Taggart 40'; Woodcock 47'; Makarounas 84'	Stadium: Mong Kok Stadium; Attendance: 800

11 October 2012	Portugal	2–1	Australia	Lisbon, Portugal
	João Mário 62' (pen.); Aladje 90+2'	Report	Taggart 67'

14 October 2012	Portugal	4–1	Australia	Lisbon, Portugal
	Aladje 9'; Pinto 45'; Ferreira 53' (pen.); Ricardo 78'	Report	Brillante 12'	Stadium: Estádio Nacional

25 May 2013	Netherlands	3–1	Australia	Emmen, Netherlands
	Maher 4'; Wijnaldum 30'; Strootman 45'	Report	Maclaren 90'	Stadium: Univé Stadion

31 May 2013	Germany	2–2	Australia	Paralimni, Cyprus
10:00 (UTC+2)	15'; 110'	Report	Maclaren 35'; Williams 94'	Stadium: Paralimni Stadium

10 June 2013	Australia	5–0	New Zealand	Wollongong, Australia
	Taggart 4', 19', 47'; Maclaren 64'; Edwards 76'	Report		Stadium: Wollongong Showground

16 June 2013	Australia	1–3	Chile	Antalya, Turkey
	Maclaren		Martínez; Lichnovsky; Bravo

==== AFC U-22 Championship qualification ====
5 July 2012	Indonesia	0–1	Australia	Pekanbaru, Indonesia
19:30 (UTC+7)		Summary	Proia 45+2'	Stadium: Riau Main Stadium; Attendance: 40,500; Referee: Tan Hai (China)

7 July 2012	Australia	3–2	Macau	Pekanbaru, Indonesia
16:00 (UTC+7)	Woodcock 2'; O'Dea 7', 13'	Summary	Vinicio 19'; Leong Ka Hang 78'	Stadium: Kaharudin Nasution Stadium; Attendance: 560; Referee: Win Cho (Myanmar)

10 July 2012	Australia	0–0	Singapore	Pekanbaru, Indonesia
16:00 (UTC+7		Summary		Stadium: Kaharudin Nasution Stadium; Attendance: 1,378; Referee: Salah Abbas Al-Abbasi (Bahrain)

12 July 2012	Timor-Leste	0–3	Australia	Pekanbaru, Indonesia
16:00 (UTC+7)		Summary	O'Dea 40'; Barker-Daish 87', 90+2'	Stadium: Riau Main Stadium; Attendance: 2,198; Referee: Yaqoob Abdul Baki (Oman)

15 July 2012	Australia	0–5	Japan	Pekanbaru, Indonesia
16:00 (UTC+7)		Summary	Notsuda 18', 54'; Iwanami 31'; Watari 45+2'; Hirota 77'	Stadium: Kaharudin Nasution Stadium; Attendance: 948; Referee: Ko Hyung-Jin (Korea Republic)

==== AFF U-19 Youth Championship ====
2 September 2012 Group stage	Australia	1–2	Uzbekistan	Hồ Chí Minh City, Vietnam
16:00 (UTC+7)	Antonis 36'	Report	Yusupov 77'; Abdumuminov 90'	Stadium: Thống Nhất Stadium; Referee: Muhammad Taqi Aljaafari Bin Jahari (Singapore)

4 September 2012 Group stage	Vietnam	0–4	Australia	Hồ Chí Minh City, Vietnam
18:30 (UTC+7)		Report	R. Edwards 31'; Barker-Daish 53'; Makarounas 57'; Dao Duy Khanh 84' (o.g.)	Stadium: Thống Nhất Stadium; Referee: Min Hla (Myanmar)

6 September 2012 Group stage	Australia	1–4	Iran	Hồ Chí Minh City, Vietnam
16:00 (UTC+7)	Geria 39'	Report	Jahanbakhsh 51', 63' (pen.); Azmoun 52', 85'	Stadium: Thống Nhất Stadium; Referee: Mohd Amirul Izwan Bin Yaacob (Malaysia)

8 September 2012 Third place play-off	Australia	4–0	Vietnam	Hồ Chí Minh City, Vietnam
16:00 (UTC+7)	Geria 12'; Woodcock 37', 73'; Taggart 66'	Report		Stadium: Thống Nhất Stadium; Referee: Chanketya Thong (Cambodia)

==== AFC U-19 Championship ====
4 November 2012 Group stage	Australia	1–0	Qatar	Fujairah, United Arab Emirates
15:00 (UTC+4)	Gameiro 11'	Report		Stadium: Fujairah Club Stadium; Attendance: 500; Referee: Kim Dong-Jin (Korea Republic)

6 November 2012 Group stage	Syria	1–1	Australia	Fujairah, United Arab Emirates
19:00 (UTC+4)	Maowas 74'	Report	Gameiro 81'	Stadium: Fujairah Club Stadium; Attendance: 1,200; Referee: Ravshan Irmatov (Uzbekistan

8 November 2012 Group stage	Australia	1–1	Saudi Arabia	Ras al-Khaimah, United Arab Emirates
17:00 (UTC+4)	Gameiro 90+1'	Report	Al-Muwallad 57'	Stadium: Emirates Club Stadium; Attendance: 170; Referee: Liu Kwok Man (Hong Kong)

11 November 2012 Quarter-final	Australia	3–0	Jordan	Fujairah, United Arab Emirates
19:00 (UTC+4)	Gameiro 10', 55', 83'	Report		Stadium: Fujairah Club Stadium; Attendance: 2,500; Referee: Alireza Faghani (Iran)

14 November 2012 Semi-final	Iraq	2–0	Australia	Ras al-Khaimah, United Arab Emirates
20:00 (UTC+4)	Abdul-Raheem 60'; Hantoosh 85'	Report		Stadium: Emirates Club Stadium; Attendance: 1,350; Referee: Liu Kwok Man (Hong Kong)

==== FIFA U-20 World Cup ====
22 June 2013	Colombia	1–1	Australia	Trabzon, Turkey
18:00	Córdoba 78'	Report	De Silva 46'	Stadium: Hüseyin Avni Aker Stadium; Attendance: 4,662; Referee: Milorad Mažić (Serbia)

25 June 2013	Australia	1–2	El Salvador	Rize, Turkey
18:00	Brillante 9'	Report	Coca 17'; Peña 40'	Stadium: Yeni Şehir Stadium; Attendance: 13,015; Referee: Stéphane Lannoy (France)

28 June 2013	Australia	1–2	Turkey	Trabzon, Turkey
21:00	Maclaren 52'	Report	Çalhanoğlu 54'; Yokuşlu 87'	Stadium: Hüseyin Avni Aker Stadium; Attendance: 11,286; Referee: Roberto García (Mexico)

=== Men's under-17 ===
==== Friendlies ====
5 August 2012	Saudi Arabia	1–1	Australia	Ta'if, Saudi Arabia
20:00 (UTC+3)	5'	Report	T. Tombides 87'

6 August 2012	Australia	1–2	United Arab Emirates	Ta'if, Saudi Arabia
	Iredale 55' (pen.)	Report	33'; 90+3'

7 August 2012	Australia	2–2 (4–3 p)	China	Ta'if, Saudi Arabia
	Gersbach 90+1'; Kuzmanovski 90+3'	Report	50'
	Penalties
	(penalty scored); Iredale (penalty missed) (penalty scored) (penalty scored); Kuzmanovski (penalty scored)		Penalty missed Penalty scored

==== AFC U-16 Championship ====
22 September 2012 Group stage	Australia	2–0	Thailand	Tehran, Iran
15:00 (UTC+3:30)	T. Tombides 14'; MacDonald 29'	Report		Stadium: Rah Ahan Stadium; Attendance: 183; Referee: Valentin Kovalenko (Uzbekistan)

24 September 2012 Group stage	Oman	1–2	Australia	Tehran, Iran
19:00 (UTC+3:30)	Al-Rushadi 52' (pen.)	Report	MacDonald 16'; Baldacchino 87'	Stadium: Rah Ahan Stadium; Attendance: 100; Referee: Yousef Al-Marzouq (Kuwait)

26 September 2012 Group stage	Australia	0–0 (2–3 p)	Iraq	Tehran, Iran
13:00 (UTC+3.30)		Report		Stadium: Shahid Dastgerdi Stadium; Attendance: 150; Referee: Kim Jong-Hyeok (South Korea)
	Penalties
	Iredale (penalty scored); Baldacchino (penalty missed); Antoiniou (penalty missed); Pudler (penalty missed); Norris (penalty scored)		Abdul-Abbas (penalty scored); Al-Mahdawi (penalty scored); Isam (penalty missed); Ammar (penalty missed); Abdul-Zahra (penalty scored)

30 September 2012 Quarter-final	Iran	5–1	Australia	Tehran, Iran
17:00 (UTC+3.30)	Ezzatollahi 31' (pen.); Chaab 35', 90+3'; Bazaj 61'; Rigi 81'	Report	Antoniou 88'	Stadium: Shahid Dastgerdi Stadium; Attendance: 3,850; Referee: Maasaki Toma (Japan)

=== Women's senior ===
==== Friendlies ====
11 July 2012 Kirin Challenge Cup	Japan	3–0	Australia	Tokyo, Japan
	Miyama 26' (pen.); Ōgimi 45'; Sawa 59'	Report		Stadium: National Stadium; Attendance: 20,000

13 September 2012	Haiti	0–4	Australia	Indianapolis, United States
		Report	Brown 6'; Gill 12'; Simon 15'; Heyman 83'	Stadium: Carroll Stadium; Referee: Michelle Cowman (United States)

16 September 2012	United States	2–1	Australia	Carson, California, United States
	Morgan 55'; Boxx 63' (pen.)	Report	De Vanna 34'	Stadium: Home Depot Center; Attendance: 19,851; Referee: Kari Seitz (United States)

19 September 2012	United States	6–2	Australia	Denver, United States
	Uzunlar 25' (o.g.); Morgan 43', 63'; Wambach 53'; Boxx 69'; Leroux 82'	Report	De Vanna 32'; Walsh 35'	Stadium: Dick's Sporting Goods Park; Attendance: 18,589; Referee: Kristin Schiereck (United States)

13 June 2013	Australia	1–0	New Zealand	Canberra, Australia
	Heyman 41'	Report		Stadium: Australian Institute of Sport; Attendance: 0 Referee: Kate Jacewicz (Australia)

16 June 2013 Centenary Cup	Australia	1–1 (4–2 p)	New Zealand	Canberra, Australia
	Polkinghorne 11'	Report	Gregorius 38'	Stadium: McKellar Park; Attendance: 2,248; Referee: Qin Liang (China)
	Penalties
	Kellond-Knight (penalty scored) van Egmond (penalty scored); Uzunlar (penalty scored); Kerr (penalty scored)		Hearn (penalty missed); Hoyle (penalty missed); Stott (penalty scored); Wilkinson (penalty scored)

29 June 2013	Netherlands	3–1	Australia	Velsen-Zuid, the Netherlands
	Martens 12', 58'; Spitse 83'	Report	Gorry 27'	Stadium: TATA Steel Stadion; Referee: Riem Hussein (Germany)

==== EAFF Women's East Asian Cup ====
20 November 2012 Preliminary round 2	Australia	7–0	Chinese Taipei	Shenzhen, China
17:00 (UTC+8)	Gill 5', 90+3'; De Vanna 22', 51'; Simon 45+1', 83'; Uzunlar 77'	Summary		Stadium: Shenzhen Stadium; Attendance: 523; Referee: Kajiyama Fusako (Japan)

22 November 2012 Preliminary round 2	Australia	4–0	Hong Kong	Shenzhen, China
17:00 (UTC+8)	Butt 33'; Simon 64'; Gill 79'; Catley 90+2'	Summary		Stadium: Shenzhen Stadium; Attendance: 488; Referee: Park Ji-Yeong (South Korea)

24 November 2012 Preliminary round 2	China	2–1	Australia	Shenzhen, China
15:45 (UTC+8)	Wang Li-Si 9'; Zhang Rui 50'	Summary	Gill 12'	Stadium: Shenzhen Stadium; Attendance: 6,333; Referee: Ri Hong-Sil (North Korea)

=== Women's under-20 ===
==== Friendlies ====
13 April 2013	Australia	2–1	South Korea	Canberra, Australia
	Andrews 27'; Yeoman-Dale 49'	Report	Choi Bich-na	Stadium: Australian Institute of Sport

19 April 2013	Australia	0–9	South Korea	Canberra, Australia
		Report	Jang Sel-gi 5', 18', 28', 52'; Lee So-dam 12'; Choe Yu-ri 70', 73'; Mangung Ye-ji 80'; Choi Bich-na 88'	Stadium: Australian Institute of Sport; Attendance: 0

22 April 2013	Australia	2–4	South Korea	Canberra, Australia
	McLaughlin 3'; Amy Harrison 20'	Report	Jang Sel-gi 34', 39'; Kim In-ji 68'; Lee So-dam 73'	Stadium: Australian Institute of Sport

=== Women's under-17 ===
==== Friendlies ====
9 May 2013	South Korea	2–0	Australia	South Korea
	Goal

12 May 2013	South Korea	1–1	Australia	Paju, South Korea
	Kim Sung-mi 7'	Report	MacQueen 54'	Stadium: National Football Training Centre

14 May 2013	South Korea	2–0	Australia	Paju, South Korea
	Goal	Report		Stadium: National Football Training Centre

==== AFC U-16 Women's Championship qualification ====
7 November 2012	Australia	5–1	Thailand	Manila, Philippines
15:00 (UTC+8)	Cantrill 3'; Franco 37'; Gavin 44', 82'; Methawi 65' (o.g.)	Report	Sudarat 19'	Stadium: Rizal Memorial Stadium; Attendance: 300; Referee: Qin Lian (China)

9 November 2012	Myanmar	0–5	Australia	Manila, Philippines
15:00 (UTC+8)		Report	Dalton 35'; Waterhouse 40'; Franco 45', 89'; Kirby 79'	Stadium: Rizal Memorial Stadium; Attendance: 300; Referee: Saltanat Noroozi (Iran)

11 November 2012	Philippines	1–8	Australia	Manila, Philippines
18:00 (UTC+8)	Arthur 24'	Report	Kirby 10'; MacQueen 12'; Waterhouse 20'; Cantrill 26', 63', 73'; Palozzi 33', 84'	Stadium: Rizal Memorial Stadium; Attendance: 500; Referee: Ri Hyang Ok (North Korea)
