= Danielle Johnson =

American soccer player

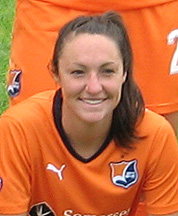

Personal information
- Full name: Danielle Marie Johnson
- Date of birth: November 17, 1987 (age 38)
- Place of birth: Baton Rouge, Louisiana, U.S.
- Height: 5 ft 5 in (1.65 m)
- Position: Defender

College career
Years	Team	Apps	(Gls)
2006–2009	Ole Miss Rebels	81	(11)

Senior career*
Years	Team	Apps	(Gls)
2010–2011	Sky Blue FC	13	(0)
2011–2013	Melbourne Victory	24	(1)
2012	Atlanta Beat	0	(0)
2012	Vancouver Whitecaps FC	14	(0)
- * Club domestic league appearances and goals

Danielle Marie Johnson (born November 17, 1987) is an American soccer defender who played for the Vancouver Whitecaps FC. She had previously played for the Melbourne Victory and the Atlanta Beat. She previously attended the University of Mississippi. In January 2012, Johnson signed with Atlanta Beat. Head coach James Galanis said of Johnson, "She is strong and fearless, and she also has good ball handling skills." After her retirement from competition, Danielle Johnson became assistant women's soccer coach at Dominican University in 2016.
