= Ruth Wallace =

Australian rules football player (born 1993)

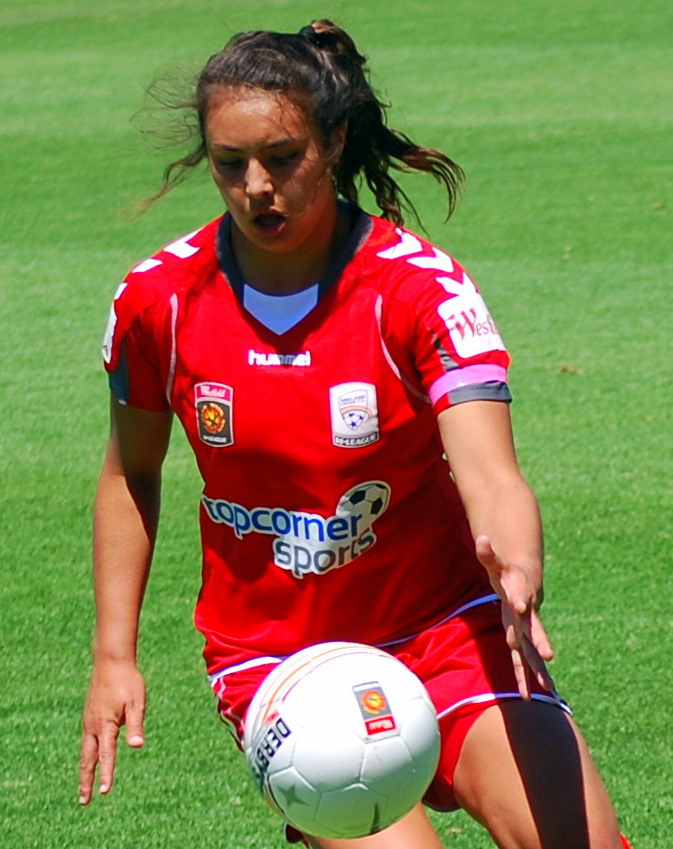
- Wallace playing soccer for Adelaide United in 2010

Personal information
- Full name: Ruth Wallace
- Date of birth: 1 February 1993 (age 33)
- Place of birth: Adelaide, Australia
- Height: 1.65 m (5 ft 5 in)
- Position: Midfielder

Youth career
- Adelaide Olympic women football club

Senior career*
Years	Team	Apps	(Gls)
2008–2013	Adelaide United	3	(1)
- * Club domestic league appearances and goals as of 6 December 2009

Ruth Wallace (born 1 February 1993) is a former Australian rules football player who played for Norwood Football Club in the SANFL Women's League and Adelaide Crows in the AFLW. Wallace decided not to renew her contract for the 2020 AFLW season for personal reasons.

She is also former soccer player who played for Adelaide United in the Australian W-League.

In 2014, Wallace ran the New York Marathon as part of the Indigenous Marathon Project.
