= Holly Patterson =

New Zealand footballer

Personal information
- Full name: Holly Patterson
- Date of birth: 16 April 1994 (age 32)
- Place of birth: Hamilton, New Zealand
- Height: 1.65 m (5 ft 5 in)
- Position: Forward

Youth career
- Three Kings United
- –2012: Claudelands Rovers

College career
Years	Team	Apps	(Gls)
2013–2017	Dartmouth Big Green		

Senior career*
Years	Team	Apps	(Gls)
2012	Adelaide United	8	(0)
2012–2013	Claudelands Rovers		
Total		8	(0)

International career^{‡}
2010	New Zealand U-17	7	(4)
2012	New Zealand U-20	12	(0)
2012	New Zealand	8	(0)
- * Club domestic league appearances and goals ‡ National team caps and goals as of 26 October 2014

Holly Patterson was born in Hamilton, New Zealand on 16 April 1994 and has represented New Zealand in association football at international level. She plays her club football with Claudelands Rovers.

== International career ==
Patterson was a member of the New Zealand U-17 side at the 2010 FIFA U-17 Women's World Cup in Trinidad and Tobago, making two appearances.

She played in all three of New Zealand's games at the 2012 FIFA U-20 Women's World Cup in Japan where they were eliminated at the group stages.

Patterson made her senior début as a substitute in a 1–2 loss to Switzerland on 7 March 2014.
