= Þóra Björg Helgadóttir =

Icelandic footballer (born 1981)

Þóra B. Helgadóttir
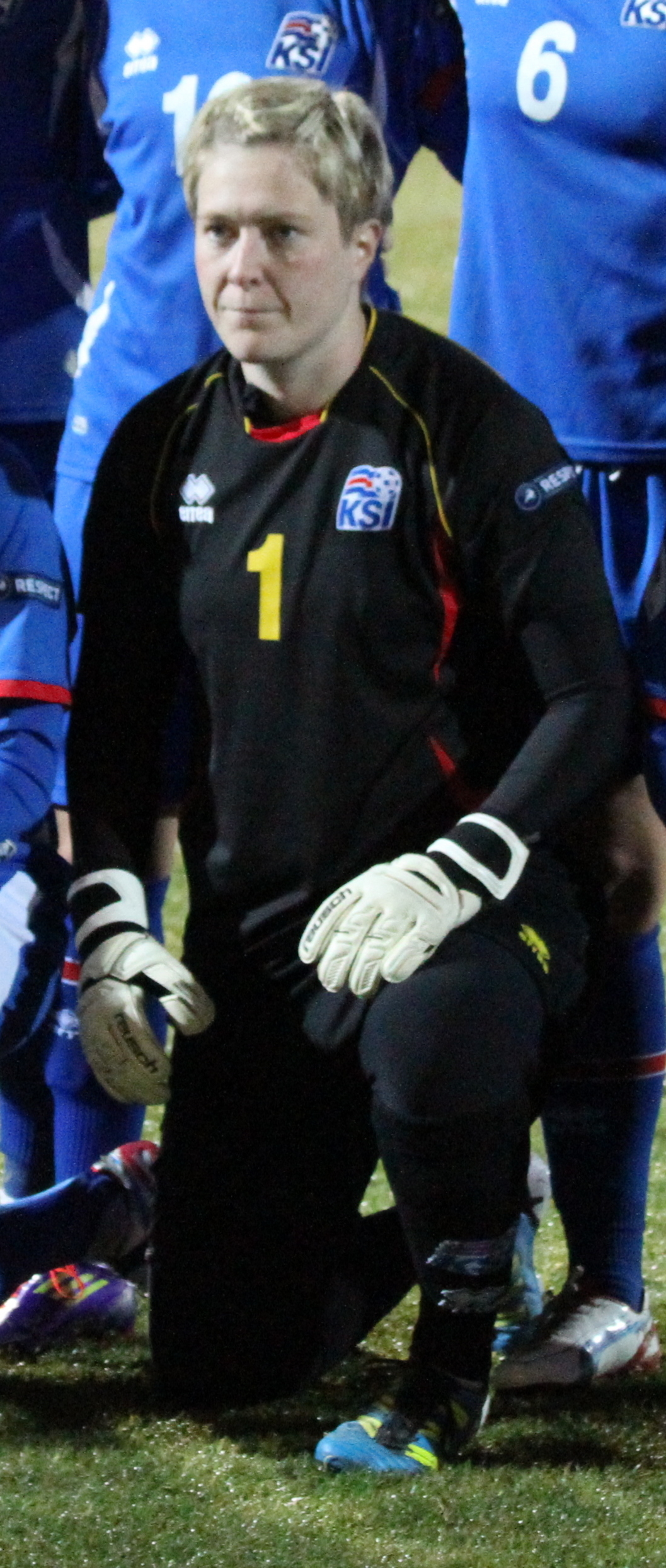
- Before Iceland's Euro 2013 play-off against Ukraine in October 2012

Personal information
- Full name: Þóra Björg Helgadóttir
- Date of birth: 5 May 1981 (age 45)
- Place of birth: Reykjavík, Iceland
- Height: 1.75 m (5 ft 9 in)
- Position: Goalkeeper

College career
Years	Team	Apps	(Gls)
2000–2003	Duke Blue Devils		

Senior career*
Years	Team	Apps	(Gls)
1995–1996	Breiðablik	6	(0)
1997	KR	1	(0)
1997–2001	Breiðablik	54	(0)
2002–2003	KR	20	(1)
2004	Kolbotn	1	(0)
2005–2006	Breiðablik	28	(1)
2007	Oud-Heverlee Leuven	8	(0)
2007–2009	R.S.C. Anderlecht	26	(1)
2007	FC Rosengård	3	(0)
2009	Kolbotn	22	(0)
2010–2013	Malmö	85	(0)
2012–2013	→ Western Sydney; Wanderers (loan)	8	(0)
2014–2015	Fylkir	11	(0)
2016–2017	Stjarnan	0	(0)

International career^{‡}
1995–1998	Iceland U-17	14	(0)
1997–1999	Iceland U-19	3	(0)
1997–2004	Iceland U-21	27	(0)
1998–2014	Iceland	108	(1)
- * Club domestic league appearances and goals as of 08:52, 28 June 2014 (UTC) ‡ National team caps and goals as of 08:52, 28 June 2014 (UTC)

Þóra Björg Helgadóttir (born 5 May 1981), commonly Anglicised as Thora Helgadottir, is an Icelandic former footballer who played as a goalkeeper. Trained at university level in the United States, she formerly played for four seasons with Duke University's women's soccer team. She most recently played for Damallsvenskan club Malmö (FC Rosengård) and had previously represented clubs in Iceland, Belgium, Norway and Australia.

Since making her debut for the Iceland women's national football team in 1998, Þóra has accrued over a century of caps. She was named in Iceland's squad for the 2009 and 2013 editions of the UEFA Women's Championship. Þóra is the younger sister of Ásthildur Helgadóttir, a former captain of the women's national football team.

In May 2014 Þóra announced via Twitter that she was leaving FC Rosengård and returning to Iceland.

== Club career ==
Þóra made her debut in the domestic Úrvalsdeild league as a 14-year-old. Playing with Breiðablik and later with KR, she went on to win eight league titles and six Icelandic Women's Cups.

From 2000 until 2003 Þóra attended Duke University, where she studied mathematics and history, and played varsity soccer.

Þóra had already spent the 2004 season in Norway as Bente Nordby's understudy at Kolbotn, when in January 2007 the opportunity to move to Belgium came up through her career outside football. In August 2007 she left Anderlecht to join sister Ásthildur in Sweden at Malmö, who needed a goalkeeper due to Caroline Jönsson's anterior cruciate ligament injury.

In 2009 Þóra played for Kolbotn and was named Toppserien Player of the Year. She signed a three-year contract with Malmö in November 2009. Malmö secured their first Damallsvenskan championship since 1994 in the 2010 season.

In the 2012–13 winter season, Þóra played on loan for Western Sydney Wanderers in the Australian W-League.

Þóra was named Damallsvenskan goalkeeper of the year in 2012 and 2013 after keeping 14 "clean sheets" as Malmö recaptured the league title from rivals Tyresö FF. She announced that her final game for Malmö, who became FC Rosengård for 2014, would be against Piteå IF on 2 July 2014. She agreed to join Fylkir of the Úrvalsdeild upon her return to Iceland.

Þóra retired after the season with Fylkir in 2015 and is now assistant manager at Fylkir.

She signed for Stjarnan in 2016.

== International career ==
Five days after turning 17, Þóra made her senior international debut for Iceland in a 1–0 friendly defeat to the United States on 10 May 1998.

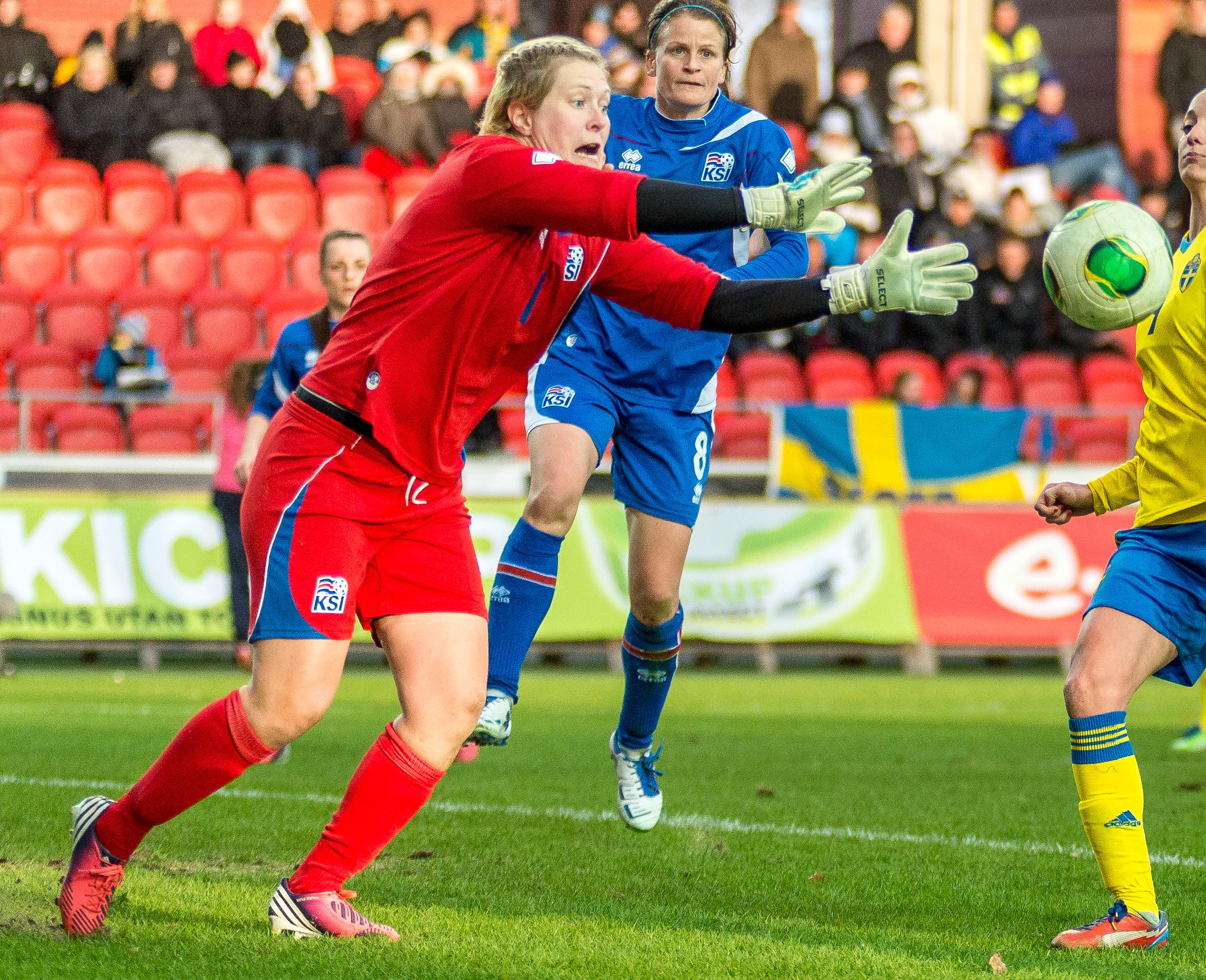
Playing an international friendly against Sweden at Myresjöhus Arena in Växjö, 6 April 2013

At UEFA Women's Euro 2009, Þóra played in two matches as Iceland were eliminated in the first round.

National team coach Siggi Eyjólfsson selected Þóra in the Iceland squad for UEFA Women's Euro 2013, although she was recovering from a hamstring injury. Guðbjörg Gunnarsdóttir took the goalkeeping position at the final tournament, playing in the three group matches and the 4–0 quarter-final defeat to hosts Sweden.

Iceland beat Norway 2–1 at the 2014 Algarve Cup, as Þóra made her 100th national team appearance.

== Personal life ==
Celebrity goldfish Sigurwin, the mascot of the Iceland women's national football team, was released into Þóra's care after UEFA Women's Euro 2013. Sigurwin came to prominence during the tournament when Ludvig Lindström of Global Happiness Organization (GHO) publicly criticised the players for keeping him in a jar and making jokes about flushing him down the toilet.
