= Petra Johansson =

Swedish footballer (born 1988)

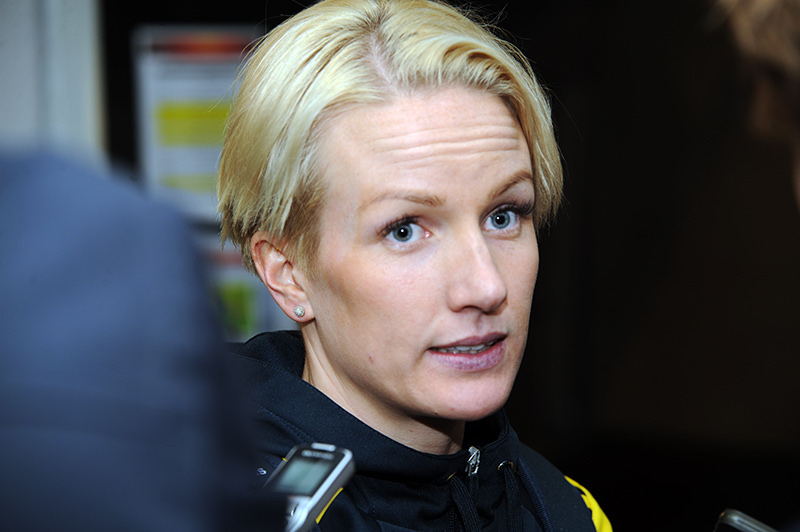

Personal information
- Full name: Anna Petra Sofia Johansson
- Date of birth: 30 September 1988 (age 38)
- Place of birth: Borlänge, Sweden
- Height: 1.65 m (5 ft 5 in)
- Position: Defensive midfielder

Youth career
- Ornäs BK

Senior career*
Years	Team	Apps	(Gls)
2006–2013	Linköping FC	114	(10)
2012–2013	→ Melbourne Victory (loan)	11	(3)
2014	Kvarnsvedens IK	24	(7)
2015	Eskilstuna United	20	(2)
2017–2019	Eskilstuna United	64	(3)
2020–2021	Linköpings FC	21	(0)

International career^{‡}
2009–2015	Sweden	9	(0)
- * Club domestic league appearances and goals as of 15:10, 29 February 2020 (UTC) ‡ National team caps and goals as of 16:05, 30 December 2015 (UTC)

Anna Petra Sofia Johansson (née Larsson; born 30 September 1988) is a Swedish football midfielder. She previously played for Linköping FC and during the 2012–13 winter season she represented Australian W-League team Melbourne Victory.

== Club career ==
In November 2016 Johansson announced that she was returning to Eskilstuna United after a year of football retirement, during which she changed her surname from Larsson and gave birth to daughter Norah.

== International career ==
Johansson made her senior international debut on 19 August 2009, in Sweden's 1–0 friendly defeat by Norway in Enköping. She was named in national coach Thomas Dennerby's squad for UEFA Women's Euro 2009, as cover for Nilla Fischer who was carrying a heel injury.

After a five-year hiatus, Johansson returned to the national team for a 1–0 UEFA Women's Euro 2017 qualifying win over Denmark in October 2015. The following month she made a shock retirement from football aged 27 years to concentrate on her civilian career. The decision disappointed national coach Pia Sundhage, who was planning to select Johansson for the 2016 UEFA Women's Olympic Qualifying Tournament.
