= Vedrana Popović =

Australian football player (born 1992)

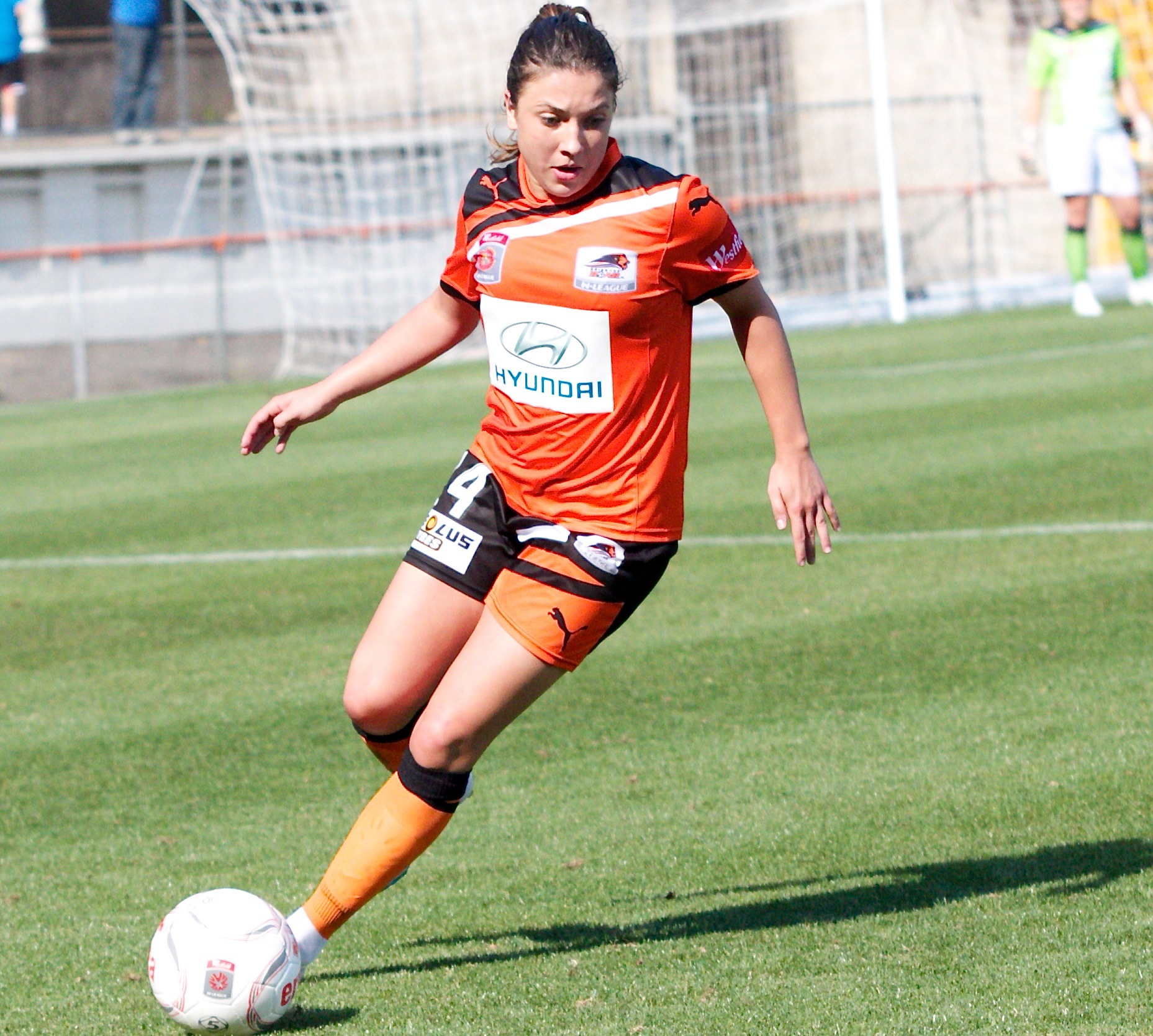
- Popović playing for Brisbane Roar in 2012

Personal information
- Date of birth: 10 January 1992 (age 34)
- Place of birth: Jajce, Bosnia and Herzegovina
- Height: 1.63 m (5 ft 4 in)
- Position: Defender

Youth career
- 2000: Annerley Football Club
- Queensland Academy of Sport

Senior career*
Years	Team	Apps	(Gls)
2008	Queensland Lions Soccer Club		
2008–2009	Queensland Roar	3	(1)
2009–2010	Melbourne Victory	9	(0)
2010–2011	Adelaide United	10	(0)
2011–2015	Brisbane Roar	39	(4)

International career^{‡}
2013–	Australia	1	(0)
- * Club domestic league appearances and goals as of 23 February 2014 ‡ National team caps and goals as of 1 January 2013

Vedrana Popović (Bosnian: [pǒpovit͡ɕ]; born 10 January 1992)) is a former soccer player. Born in Yugoslavia, she played for the Australia national team.

== Playing career ==
Popovic has played for Brisbane Roar, Melbourne Victory and Adelaide United in the Australian W-League.

In 2013, Popovic made her debut for Australia.

== Honours ==
With Brisbane Roar:

- W-League Premiership: 2008–09
- W-League Championship: 2008–09
