= Emma Kete =

New Zealand footballer (born 1987)

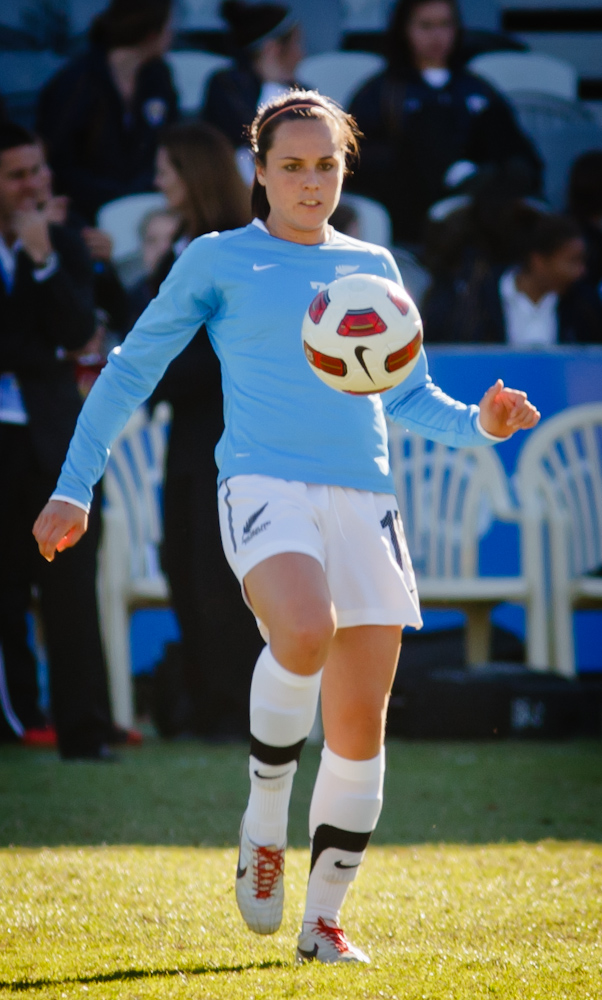
- Kete playing for New Zealand in 2011

Personal information
- Full name: Emma Jillian Kete
- Date of birth: 1 September 1987 (age 39)
- Place of birth: Auckland, New Zealand
- Height: 1.63 m (5 ft 4 in)
- Position: Centre forward

Senior career*
Years	Team	Apps	(Gls)
2008–2009	Three Kings United		
2009	Ottawa Fury Women	6	(1)
2010–2011	Three Kings United		
2011	Lincoln Ladies	1	(0)
2011	PK-35 Vantaa	6	(3)
2011	Perth Glory	4	(2)
2012	Canberra United	3	(0)
2012–2013	Sydney FC	13	(5)
2013	Bad Neuenahr	9	(0)
2013–2014	Sydney FC	13	(4)
2014	Western New York Flash	3	(0)
2014–2015	Manchester City	4	(0)
2015	Fencibles United		
2015–2016	Canberra United	6	(0)

International career^{‡}
- New Zealand U-20
2007–	New Zealand	50	(3)
- * Club domestic league appearances and goals as of 2 May 2019 ‡ National team caps and goals as of 29 April 2019

Emma Jillian Kete (born 1 September 1987) is a New Zealand footballer who most recently played as a centre forward for Canberra United and the New Zealand national team.

== Club career ==
Kete joined Ottawa Fury Women in July 2009, playing alongside fellow Kiwis Amber Hearn, Hayley Moorwood and Ria Percival at the Canadian W-League club.

She signed for Naisten liiga club PK-35 Vantaa in September 2011. With PK-35 she won her first trophy by winning the Finnish Women's Cup.

She then played at Canberra United, and won the W-League with them. After the season she transferred to Sydney FC, who then won the W-League as well.

In 2013, she transferred to German side SC 07 Bad Neuenahr.

In early 2014 she then moved on to her first American team, signing with Western New York Flash. She appeared only in three games. She then moved in July 2014 to join newcomers to the FA Women's Super League in England, Manchester City. She re-joined Canberra United in September 2015.

== International career ==
Kete travelled with the New Zealand U20 national team side to the 2006 Women's U-20 World Cup in Russia, making a late substitute appearance in their opening game against Australia.

Kete made her debut with the senior national team against Australia on 4 February 2007.

She was included in the New Zealand squad for the 2008 Summer Olympics, starting in each of New Zealand's group games against Japan (2–2), Norway (1–0 loss) and USA (4–0 loss).

She was part of New Zealand's squad at the 2015 FIFA Women's World Cup in Canada.

== Personal life ==
Emma was married to England footballer Jodie Taylor.

== Honors ==
PK-35 Vantaa

- Naisten Liiga: 2011
- Naisten Cup: 2011

Canberra United FC

- W-League: 2011–12

Sydney FC

- W-League: 2012–13

Manchester City

- Women's Super League Cup: 2014
