= Sarah McLaughlin =

New Zealand footballer (born 1991)

Personal information
- Full name: Sarah Jane McLaughlin
- Date of birth: 3 June 1991 (age 35)
- Place of birth: New Zealand
- Height: 1.66 m (5 ft 5 1/2 in)
- Position: Striker

Team information
- Current team: Claudelands Rovers

Senior career*
Years	Team	Apps	(Gls)
2007–2012	Claudelands Rovers		
2012–2013	Adelaide United	10	(4)
2013–	Claudelands Rovers		

International career^{‡}
2008	New Zealand U-17		
2008–2010	New Zealand U-20	13	(2)
2009–2011	New Zealand	11	(0)
- * Club domestic league appearances and goals ‡ National team caps and goals as of 22 June 2011

Sarah Jane McLaughlin (born 3 June 1991) is an association football player who plays for Claudelands Rovers. She represented New Zealand at international level.

She was a member of the New Zealand squad in the inaugural FIFA U-17 Women's World Cup, playing all three group games; a 0–1 loss to Canada, a 1–2 loss to Denmark, and a 1–3 win to Colombia.

McLaughlin also represented New Zealand at the 2008 FIFA U-20 Women's World Cup in Chile, again playing all three group games; a 2–3 loss to Nigeria, a 4–3 win over hosts Chile, and scored New Zealand's goal against England before England equalised late in injury time to eliminate New Zealand from the tournament. In 2010, she represented New Zealand at the 2010 FIFA U-20 Women's World Cup, playing in two group games.

McLaughlin made her senior Football Ferns debut as a substitute in a 0–6 loss to China on 10 January 2009.
