= Louise Schillgard =

Swedish footballer (born 1989)

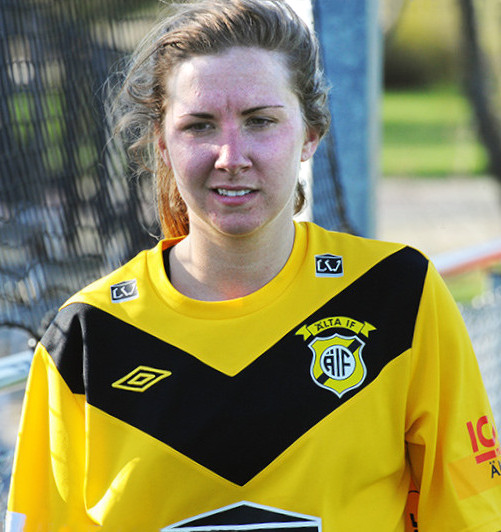

Personal information
- Full name: Louise Anneli Schillgard
- Birth name: Louise Anneli Fors
- Date of birth: 23 October 1989 (age 37)
- Place of birth: Stockholm, Sweden
- Height: 1.71 m (5 ft 7 in)
- Position: Midfielder

Youth career
- 1994–1998: FoC Farsta
- 1998–2004: IF Brommapojkarna

Senior career*
Years	Team	Apps	(Gls)
2004–2007	Hammarby		
2008–2009	AIK	41	(9)
2009–2010	Espanyol	13	(1)
2010–2012	Linköping	50	(10)
2012	Western Sydney Wanderers	9	(5)
2013	Liverpool	14	(9)
2014	→ Älta (loan)	4	(1)
2016	Boston Breakers	18	(1)

International career
2008–2012	Sweden	23	(0)
- * Club domestic league appearances and goals as of 20 November 2016

Louise Anneli Schillgard (née Fors; born 23 October 1989) is a Swedish professional footballer who plays as a midfielder. She last played for Boston Breakers of the American National Women's Soccer League (NWSL) in 2016. She did not play in 2015 but spent part of 2014 with Älta IF of the Elitettan, on loan from Liverpool of the English FA WSL. At club level she also played for Linköping FC in Sweden's Damallsvenskan, Hammarby IF, AIK, Western Sydney Wanderers FC in Australia's W-League, and RCD Espanyol in Spain's Superliga Femenina. Schillgard won 23 caps for the Sweden women's national football team and represented her country at UEFA Women's Euro 2009 in Finland.

== Club career ==
Nicknamed "Lollo", she signed a two-year extension to her Linköpings contract in October 2011.

On 12 December 2012 it was announced that Schillgard had signed a contract with Liverpool. On 29 September 2013, in the end-of-season decider 2–0 win against Bristol, Schillgard scored Liverpool's first goal from the penalty spot and helped Liverpool clinch their first FA WSL title. Schillgard departed Liverpool on loan in January 2014, to play for Älta IF of the Elitettan. The decision was related to the planning of her wedding. She intended to return to the Reds for their UEFA Women's Champions League campaign in 2014–15.

On 30 June 2014, twenty-four-year-old Schillgard announced her sudden retirement from all football. Having played at the top level since the age of 14, she wanted to prioritise her family life, but did not rule out a return to professional soccer in future.

In January 2016 she was tempted out of retirement by her former Liverpool coach Matt Beard, who signed her for his new club, Boston Breakers of the National Women's Soccer League (NWSL).

On 10 November 2016, after one season at Boston Breakers, the club announced Schillgard was not returning for the 2017 season for personal reasons.

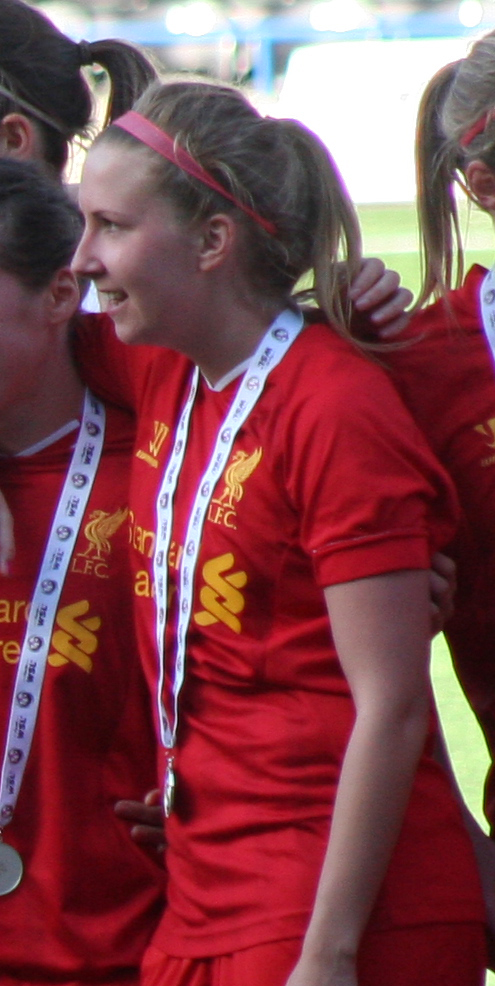
Winning the 2013 FA WSL with Liverpool

== International career ==
Schillgard was a member of the Swedish national team from her debut against Romania in September 2008, and played at the 2009 European Championship. She subsequently took part in the 2011 World Cup qualifying campaign, but was not selected for the final tournament.

She was also overlooked for the 2012 Olympic football tournament in London and UEFA Women's Euro 2013, which Sweden hosted. Disappointed Schillgard suspected that she was excluded on grounds of her character rather than her ability.

== Honours ==
=== Club ===
Liverpool

- FA WSL (1): 2013

== See also ==
- Foreign players in the FA WSL
- List of foreign W-League (Australia) players
- List of foreign NWSL players
- List of Western Sydney Wanderers Women players
