= 2008–09 Canberra United FC (women) season =

Canberra United
2008–09 season
- Chairman: Mel Patzwald
- Head Coach: Robbie Hooker
- Stadium: McKellar Park
- W-League: 3rd
- W-League Finals: Runners-up
- Top goalscorer: Caitlin Munoz (4)
- Highest home attendance: 1,637 vs. Central Coast Mariners (9 November 2008); W-League
- Lowest home attendance: 712 vs. Queensland Roar (27 December 2008); W-League
- Average home league attendance: 1,029
- Biggest win: 3–0 vs. Central Coast Mariners (A) (13 December 2008); W-League
- Biggest defeat: 0–2 vs. Queensland Roar (A) (17 January 2009); W-League Grand Final

The 2008–09 season was Canberra United Football Club's first season, in the newly formed women's league in Australia the W-League. Canberra United finished 3rd in their W-League season, finishing as runners-up in the Grand Final.

== Review ==
The first announcement of the club came in July 2008, coinciding with the establishment of the new W-League. The formation of the new club presented a unique situation in the league, that it was not associated with an established A-League side. In August, Canberra appointed Matildas assistant coach Robbie Hooker as coach for the inaugural season, and ACT Senator Kate Lundy as club chair. United also announced its first key signing in local Canberran and Matildas goalkeeper Lydia Williams. Hooker made a number of key signings in the first registration window, also securing Caitlin Munoz, Amy Chapman, Grace Gill-McGrath, Hayley Crawford, Rhian Davies, Thea Slatyer for the inaugural season. The squad was further expanded in the lead up to the first round, signing on a number of players from the ACT and Southern NSW, and also signing Sasha McDonnell and Kara Mowbray from Queensland. The final squad presented significant strength on paper, boasting eight full internationals and a further four Young Matildas.

United started the season steadily, alternating losses and wins in the opening rounds - including a win over eventual Premiers Queensland Roar. Scoring came with some difficulty for the side, with four goals in their opening first five matches. Influencing this record was an injury to striker Caitlin Munoz in Round 1, keeping her sidelined for a number of weeks. Munoz's return to the side in Round 6 immediately lifted the scoring rate, contributing four goals in the last five rounds. Despite early losses, Canberra were unbeaten in the last seven rounds of the competition, achieving a third placed finish with a record of four wins, four draws and two losses. Canberra's strength throughout the season has been in defence, drawn from a number of experienced players. In front of a dependable Williams in goal, a defensive backline led by Thea Slatyer and captain Ellie Brush frustrated opposition and ensured the second-best defensive record in the competition, bettered only by Premiers Queensland.

United won their away semi-final against Newcastle Jets, and progressed to the inaugural final, where they were defeated by Queensland Roar.

== Players ==
Name and position	No	Joined in	Former team	Birth date	Citizenship
Goalkeepers
Lydia Williams	1	2008	(Australia) ACT Academy of Sport	13 May 1988 (age 37)	(Australia)
Maja Blasch	20	2008	(Australia) Canberra City SC	19 June 1990 (age 35)	(Australia)
Defenders
Ellie Brush (c)	7	2008	(Australia) ACT Academy of Sport	19 August 1988 (age 37)	(Australia)
Rhian Davies	2	2008	(Australia) NSW Institute of Sport	5 January 1981 (age 45)	(Australia)
Grace Gill-McGrath	9	2008	(Australia) ACT Academy of Sport	27 June 1989 (age 36)	(Australia)
Rebecca Kiting	8	2008	(Australia) ACT Academy of Sport	8 May 1991 (age 34)	(Australia)
Thea Slatyer (vc)	13	2008	(Australia) NSW Institute of Sport	2 February 1983 (age 42)	(Australia)
Bronwyn Studman	4	2008	(Australia) ACT Academy of Sport	24 March 1992 (age 33)	(Australia)
Snez Veljanovska	16	2008	(Australia) ACT Academy of Sport	(age 20)	(Australia)
Christine Walters	17	2008	(Australia) ACT Academy of Sport	17 June 1991 (age 34)	(Australia)
Midfielders
Lucy Allan	18	2008	(Australia) ACT Academy of Sport	30 June 1991 (age 34)	(Australia)
Jennifer Bisset	19	2008	(Australia) ACT Academy of Sport	28 January 1992 (age 33)	(Australia)
Cian Maciejewski	11	2008	(Australia) Belwest Foxes	14 June 1987 (age 38)	(Australia)
Kara Mowbray	12	2008	(Australia) Queensland Lions	7 May 1985 (age 40)	(Australia)
Nicole Sykes	15	2008	(Australia) Western NSW Panthers FC	15 December 1991 (age 34)	(Australia)
Forwards
Amy Chapman	3	2008	(Australia) ACT Academy of Sport	2 December 1987 (age 38)	(Australia)
Hayley Crawford	10	2008	(Australia) NSW Institute of Sport	27 March 1984 (age 41)	(Australia)
Sasha McDonnell	5	2008	(Australia) Queensland Lions	12 January 1987 (age 39)	(Australia)
Caitlin Munoz	6	2008	(United States) Pali Blues	4 October 1983 (age 42)	(Australia)
Ashleigh Sykes	14	2008	(Australia) Western NSW Panthers FC	15 December 1991 (age 34)	(Australia)

== Transfers ==
=== Short-term signings ===
Player	Team	Start Date	End Date	Reason
(Australia) Ellie Raymond	ACTAS	29 October 2008	6 November 2008	Cover for Ashleigh Sykes while on international duty
(Australia) Sophie Kochinos	ACTAS	29 October 2008	6 November 2008	Cover for Christine Walters while on international duty
(Australia) Michaela Day	Belwest Foxes	29 October 2008	6 November 2008	Cover for Bronwyn Studman while on international duty

== Competitions ==
=== Overall record ===
Competition	First match	Last match	Starting round	Final position	Record							
Competition	First match	Last match	Starting round	Final position	Pld	W	D	L	GF	GA	GD	Win %
W-League	26 October 2008	27 December 2008	Matchday 1	3rd	10	4	4	2	14	10	+4	40.00
W-League Finals	10 January 2009	17 January 2009	Semi-finals	Grand Final	2	1	0	1	1	2	−1	50.00
Total					12	5	4	3	15	12	+3	41.67

Source: Competitions

=== W-League ===
==== League table ====
Pos	Team	Pld	W	D	L	GF	GA	GD	Pts	Qualification
1	Queensland Roar (C)	10	8	1	1	27	7	+20	25	Qualification to Finals series
2	Newcastle Jets	10	5	2	3	17	12	+5	17	Qualification to Finals series
3	Canberra United	10	4	4	2	14	10	+4	16	Qualification to Finals series
4	Sydney FC	10	4	2	4	15	14	+1	14	Qualification to Finals series
5	Melbourne Victory	10	4	0	6	13	13	0	12	
6	Central Coast Mariners	10	4	0	6	15	20	−5	12	
7	Perth Glory	10	3	2	5	14	24	−10	11	
8	Adelaide United	10	2	1	7	13	28	−15	7	

Rules for classification: 1) points; 2) goal difference; 3) number of goals scored.
(C) Champions

==== Results summary ====
Overall								Home						Away					
Pld	W	D	L	GF	GA	GD	Pts	W	D	L	GF	GA	GD	W	D	L	GF	GA	GD
10	4	4	2	14	10	+4	16	1	3	1	6	6	0	3	1	1	8	4	+4

Source: worldfootball.net

==== Results by round ====
Round	1	2	3	4	5	6	7	8	9	10
Ground	A	A	H	A	H	A	H	A	H	H
Result	L	W	L	W	D	D	D	W	W	D
Position	5	6	6	4	4	5	5	4	3	3
Points	0	3	3	6	7	8	9	12	15	16

Source: worldfootball.net
A = Away; H = Home; W = Win; D = Draw; L = Loss

==== Matches ====
The league fixtures were announced on 1 October 2008.

Win Draw Loss

26 October 2008 1	Newcastle Jets	2–1	Canberra United	Newcastle
13:30 AEDT	Gil 24', 82'	Report	McDonnell 2'	Stadium: Wanderers Oval; Attendance: 1,110; Referee: Jacqui Melksham

1 November 2008 2	Queensland Roar	0–1	Canberra United	Brisbane
15:00 AEST		Report	Mowbray 16'	Stadium: Perry Park; Attendance: 610; Referee: Prue Donohoe

9 November 2008 3	Canberra United	1–2	Central Coast Mariners	Canberra
17:00 AEDT	Brush 51' (pen.)	Report	Simon 46', 73'	Stadium: McKellar Park; Attendance: 1,637; Referee: Jacqui Melksham

15 November 2008 4	Melbourne Victory	0–1	Canberra United	Melbourne
19:00 AEDT		Report	McDonnell 24'	Stadium: Bob Jane Stadium; Attendance: 700~; Referee: Casey Reibelt

22 November 2008 5	Canberra United	0–0	Adelaide United	Canberra
16:00 AEDT		Report		Stadium: McKellar Park; Attendance: 804; Referee: Casey Reibelt

30 November 2008 6	Perth Glory	2–2	Canberra United	Perth
16:00 AWST	D'Ovidio 34'; De Vanna 54'	Report	Munoz 81'; Sykes 89'	Stadium: Members Equity Stadium; Attendance: 479; Referee: Lee Corey

6 December 2008 7	Canberra United	1–1	Sydney FC	Canberra
18:00 AEDT	Munoz 37'	Report	Marsh 43'	Stadium: McKellar Park; Attendance: 840; Referee: Prue Donohoe

13 December 2008 8	Central Coast Mariners	0–3	Canberra United	Sydney
18:00 AEDT		Report	Brush 21'; Crawford 71'; Munoz 78'	Stadium: Parramatta Stadium; Referee: Kirralee Gardener

20 December 2008 9	Canberra United	3–2	Melbourne Victory	Canberra
18:00 AEDT	Brush 35'; Mowbray 83'; Chapman 90+3'	Report	Groenewald 82'; Oostdam 85'	Stadium: McKellar Park; Attendance: 1,152; Referee: Lee Corey

27 December 2008 10	Canberra United	1–1	Queensland Roar	Canberra
18:00 AEDT	Munoz 66'	Report	Popovic 87'	Stadium: McKellar Park; Attendance: 712; Referee: Jacqui Melksham

==== Finals series ====
10 January 2009 Semi-finals	Newcastle Jets	0–1	Canberra United	Newcastle
16:00 AEDT		Report	Mowbray 25'	Stadium: EnergyAustralia Stadium; Attendance: 2,889; Referee: Sara Hodson

17 January 2009 Grand Final	Queensland Roar	2–0	Canberra United	Brisbane
15:00 AEST	Harch 6'; Butt 26'	Report		Stadium: Ballymore Stadium; Attendance: 4,554; Referee: Kate Jacewicz

== Statistics ==
=== Appearances and goals ===
Includes all competitions. Players with no appearances not included in the list.

No.	Pos	Nat	Player	Total		W-League		W-League Finals	
No.	Pos	Nat	Player	Apps	Goals	Apps	Goals	Apps	Goals
1	GK	(Australia) AUS	Lydia Williams	12	0	10	0	2	0
2	DF	(Australia) AUS	Rhian Davies	6	0	4	0	2	0
3	FW	(Australia) AUS	Amy Chapman	12	1	10	1	2	0
4	DF	(Australia) AUS	Bronwyn Studman	7	0	5+1	0	0+1	0
5	FW	(Australia) AUS	Sasha McDonnell	11	2	9	2	2	0
6	FW	(Australia) AUS	Caitlin Munoz	8	3	5+1	3	2	0
7	DF	(Australia) AUS	Ellie Brush	12	3	10	3	2	0
8	DF	(Australia) AUS	Rebecca Kiting	11	0	6+4	0	1	0
9	MF	(Australia) AUS	Grace Gill	9	0	7	0	1+1	0
10	FW	(Australia) AUS	Hayley Crawford	7	1	5	1	2	0
11	MF	(Australia) AUS	Cian Maciejewski	10	0	8	0	1+1	0
12	MF	(Australia) AUS	Kara Mowbray	12	3	8+2	2	2	1
13	DF	(Australia) AUS	Thea Slatyer	11	0	9	0	2	0
14	FW	(Australia) AUS	Ashleigh Sykes	11	2	6+3	2	1+1	0
15	DF	(Australia) AUS	Nicole Begg	7	0	4+2	0	0+1	0
16	DF	(Australia) AUS	Snez Veljanovska	1	0	0+1	0	0	0
17	DF	(Australia) AUS	Christine Walters	6	0	2+4	0	0	0
18	MF	(Australia) AUS	Lucy Allan	4	0	2+2	0	0	0
19	MF	(Australia) AUS	Jennifer Bisset	6	0	6	0	0	0
23	FW	(Australia) AUS	Ellie Raymond	2	0	0+2	0	0	0

- Source: worldfootball.net

=== Disciplinary record ===
Includes all competitions. The list is sorted by squad number when total cards are equal. Players with no cards not included in the list.

No.	Pos	Nat	Player	Total			W-League			W-League Finals		
No.	Pos	Nat	Player	Yellow card	Second yellow card	Red card	Yellow card	Second yellow card	Red card	Yellow card	Second yellow card	Red card
13	DF	(Australia) AUS	Thea Slatyer	1	0	1	1	0	1	0	0	0
11	MF	(Australia) AUS	Cian Maciejewski	5	0	0	5	0	0	0	0	0
5	FW	(Australia) AUS	Sasha McDonnell	2	0	0	2	0	0	0	0	0
12	MF	(Australia) AUS	Kara Mowbray	2	0	0	2	0	0	0	0	0
2	DF	(Australia) AUS	Rhian Davies	1	0	0	1	0	0	0	0	0
3	FW	(Australia) AUS	Amy Chapman	1	0	0	1	0	0	0	0	0
4	DF	(Australia) AUS	Bronwyn Studman	1	0	0	1	0	0	0	0	0
6	FW	(Australia) AUS	Caitlin Munoz	1	0	0	1	0	0	0	0	0
7	DF	(Australia) AUS	Ellie Brush	1	0	0	1	0	0	0	0	0
10	FW	(Australia) AUS	Hayley Crawford	1	0	0	1	0	0	0	0	0
15	DF	(Australia) AUS	Nicole Begg	1	0	0	1	0	0	0	0	0

- Source: worldfootball.net
- (yellow card) = Number of bookings; (second yellow card) = Number of sending offs after a second yellow card; (red card) = Number of sending offs by a direct red card.
