= 2009 Canberra United FC (women) season =

Canberra United
2009 season
- Chairman: Kate Lundy
- Head Coach: Ray Junna
- Stadium: McKellar Park
- W-League: 4th
- W-League Finals: Semi-finals
- Top goalscorer: League: Ellie Brush; Tseng Shu-o (4 each); All: Ellie Brush; Tseng Shu-o (4 each)
- Highest home attendance: 953 vs. Sydney FC (10 October 2009); W-League
- Lowest home attendance: 602 vs. Brisbane Roar (7 November 2009); W-League
- Average home league attendance: 772
- Biggest win: 4–0 vs. Perth Glory (H) (14 November 2009); W-League
- Biggest defeat: 0–3 vs. Brisbane Roar (A) (3 October 2009); W-League; 0–3 vs. Sydney FC (A) (12 December 2009); W-League Finals

The 2009 season was Canberra United Football Club's second season, in the W-League. Canberra United finished 4th in their W-League season, and finished in the semi-finals.

== Players ==
Players confirmed for 2009 season:

Note: Flags indicate national team as defined under FIFA eligibility rules; some limited exceptions apply. Players may hold more than one non-FIFA nationality.

No.	Pos.	Nation	Player
1	GK	AUS	Lydia Williams (co-captain)
2	DF	AUS	Rebecca Kiting
3	DF	AUS	Bronwyn Studman
4	DF	TPE	Lin Chiung-ying
5	MF	AUS	Kahlia Hogg
6	FW	AUS	Ellie Raymond
7	DF	AUS	Ellie Brush (co-captain)
8	MF	AUS	Emily van Egmond
9	DF	AUS	Grace Gill-McGrath
10	FW	TPE	Tseng Shu-o

No.	Pos.	Nation	Player
11	MF	AUS	Cian Maciejewski
12	DF	AUS	Snez Veljanovska
14	FW	AUS	Ashleigh Sykes
15	MF	AUS	Nicole Sykes
16	DF	AUS	Ellyse Perry
17	DF	AUS	Christine Walters
18	MF	AUS	Sally Shipard
19	MF	AUS	Jennifer Bisset
20	GK	AUS	Jocelyn Mara

== Transfers ==
=== Transfers in ===
- Kahlia Hogg (ACTAS)
- Ellie Raymond (ACTAS)
- Emily van Egmond (Newcastle Jets)
- Lin Chiung-ying (National Taiwan College of Physical Education)
- Tseng Shu-o (National Taiwan Normal University)
- Ellyse Perry (Central Coast Mariners)
- Sally Shipard (unattached)
- Jocelyn Mara (Belconnen United FC)

=== Transfers out ===
- Caitlin Munoz – Assistant Coach (non-playing; knee operation)
- Amy Chapman (released / knee operation)
- Kara Mowbray (Melbourne Victory)
- Sasha McDonnell (Brisbane Roar)
- Maja Blasch (released)
- Rhian Davies (released)
- Thea Slatyer (released)
- Lucy Allan (released)
- Hayley Crawford (released)

== Competitions ==
=== Overall record ===
Competition	First match	Last match	Starting round	Final position	Record							
Competition	First match	Last match	Starting round	Final position	Pld	W	D	L	GF	GA	GD	Win %
W-League	3 October 2009	5 December 2009	Matchday 1	4th	10	4	2	4	17	12	+5	40.00
W-League Finals	12 December 2009		Semi-finals	Semi-finals	1	0	0	1	0	3	−3	0.00
Total					11	4	2	5	17	15	+2	36.36

Source: Competitions

=== W-League ===
==== League table ====
Pos	Team	Pld	W	D	L	GF	GA	GD	Pts	Qualification
1	Sydney FC (C)	10	7	2	1	25	10	+15	23	Qualification to Finals series
2	Central Coast Mariners	10	7	1	2	24	7	+17	22	Qualification to Finals series
3	Brisbane Roar	10	6	3	1	24	7	+17	21	Qualification to Finals series
4	Canberra United	10	4	2	4	17	12	+5	14	Qualification to Finals series
5	Melbourne Victory	10	4	2	4	9	10	−1	14	
6	Perth Glory	10	4	1	5	11	22	−11	13	
7	Adelaide United	10	0	3	7	7	31	−24	3	
8	Newcastle Jets	10	0	2	8	7	25	−18	2	

Source: au.soccerway.com
Rules for classification: 1) points; 2) goal difference; 3) number of goals scored.
(C) Champions

==== Results summary ====
Overall								Home						Away					
Pld	W	D	L	GF	GA	GD	Pts	W	D	L	GF	GA	GD	W	D	L	GF	GA	GD
10	4	2	4	17	12	+5	14	3	0	2	11	4	+7	1	2	2	6	8	−2

Source: worldfootball.net

==== Results by round ====
Round	1	2	3	4	5	6	7	8	9	10
Ground	A	H	A	H	A	H	H	A	A	H
Result	L	L	D	W	D	L	W	W	L	W
Position	8	8	7	6	6	6	5	4	5	4
Points	0	0	1	4	4	4	7	10	10	13

Source: worldfootball.net
A = Away; H = Home; W = Win; D = Draw; L = Loss

==== Matches ====
3 October 2009 1	Brisbane Roar	3–0	Canberra United	Brisbane
15:00 AEST	Beutel 32', 68'; Butt 64'	Report		Stadium: Ballymore Stadium; Attendance: 1,174; Referee: Sara Hodson

10 October 2009 2	Canberra United	1–2	Sydney FC	Canberra
17:00 AEDT	Brush 89'	Report	Walsh 19'; Paaske 83'	Stadium: McKellar Park; Attendance: 953; Referee: Peta McCallum

17 October 2009 3	Perth Glory	2–2	Canberra United	Perth
15:00 AWST	McCallum 6'; Tabain 8'	Report	Tseng 61'; Sykes 82'	Stadium: Clipsal Stadium; Referee: Casey Reibelt

24 October 2009 4	Canberra United	2–0	Melbourne Victory	Canberra
17:00 AEDT	Tseng 27', 48'	Report		Stadium: McKellar Park; Attendance: 856; Referee: Sara Hodson

31 October 2009 5	Central Coast Mariners	1–1	Canberra United	Canberra
16:15 AEDT	Brush 3'	Report	Fletcher 20'	Stadium: Canberra Stadium; Referee: Kate Jacewicz

7 November 2009 6	Canberra United	1–2	Brisbane Roar	Canberra
15:00 AEDT	Maciejewski 58'	Report	Burgess 6'; Kellond-Knight 74'	Stadium: McKellar Park; Attendance: 602; Referee: Pru Donohoe

14 November 2009 7	Canberra United	4–0	Perth Glory	Canberra
17:00 AEDT	Sykeds 41'; Brush 52'; Raymond 77'; Gibbons 90+2'	Report		Stadium: McKellar Park; Attendance: 684; Referee: Kirralee Gardener

22 November 2009 8	Newcastle Jets	1–3	Canberra United	Newcastle
14:15 AEDT	Neilson 55' (pen.)	Report	Maciejewski 10'; Tseng 61'; Hogg 80'	Stadium: EnergyAustralia Stadium; Referee: Peta McCallum

28 November 2009 9	Melbourne Victory	1–0	Canberra United	Melbourne
15:00 AEDT	Thorlakson 89'	Report		Stadium: Olympic Park; Referee: Catherine Hofmann

5 December 2009 10	Canberra United	3–0	Adelaide United	Canberra
17:00 AEDT	Brush 45+1'; van Egmond 86'; Perry 90'	Report		Stadium: Deakin Football Stadium; Attendance: 785; Referee: Peta McCallum

==== Finals series ====
12 December 2009 Semi-finals	Sydney FC	3–0	Canberra United	Sydney
15:00 AEDT	Walsh 45'; Khamis 60'; Garriock 84'	Report		Stadium: Shark Park; Attendance: 741; Referee: Casey Reibelt

== Statistics ==
=== Appearances and goals ===
Last updated 10 October 2009

No.	Pos.	Name	W-League		W-League Finals		Total		Discipline	
No.	Pos.	Name	Apps	Goals	Apps	Goals	Apps	Goals	Yellow card	Red card
1	GK	(Australia) Lydia Williams	2	0	0	0	2	0	0	0
2	DF	(Australia) Rebecca Kiting	0	0	0	0	0	0	0	0
3	DF	(Australia) Bronwyn Studman	0	0	0	0	0	0	0	0
4	DF	(Australia) Lin Chiung-ying	2	0	0	0	2	0	1	0
5	MF	(Australia) Kahlia Hogg	2	0	0	0	2	0	0	0
6	FW	(Australia) Ellie Raymond	2	0	0	0	2	0	0	0
7	DF	(Australia) Ellie Brush	2	1	0	0	2	1	0	0
8	MF	(Australia) Emily van Egmond	1	0	0	0	1	0	0	0
9	DF	(Australia) Grace Gill-McGrath	2	0	0	0	2	0	0	0
10	FW	(Australia) Tseng Shu-o	2	0	0	0	2	0	1	0
11	MF	(Australia) Cian Maciejewski	2	0	0	0	2	0	0	0
12	DF	(Australia) Snez Veljanovska	1	0	0	0	1	0	0	0
14	FW	(Australia) Ashleigh Sykes	2	0	0	0	2	0	1	0
15	MF	(Australia) Nicole Sykes	1	0	0	0	1	0	0	0
16	DF	(Australia) Ellyse Perry	2	0	0	0	2	0	0	0
17	DF	(Australia) Christine Walters	0	0	0	0	0	0	0	0
18	MF	(Australia) Sally Shipard	0	0	0	0	0	0	0	0
19	MF	(Australia) Jennifer Bisset	2	0	0	0	2	0	0	0
20	GK	(Australia) Jocelyn Mara	0	0	0	0	0	0	0	0
