= 2009 W-League grand final (January) =

Coordinates: 27°26′31″S 153°1′4″E

2008–09 W-League grand final
- Event: 2008–09 W-League
Queensland Roar	Canberra United
2	0
- Date: 17 January 2009
- Venue: Ballymore Stadium, Brisbane, Queensland, Australia
- Man of the Match: Lana Harch, Queensland Roar
- Referee: Kate Jacewicz
- Attendance: 4,554

The 2008–09 W-League grand final was the grand final of the inaugural season of the W-League, the premier league of football (soccer) in Australia.
Top of the table in the regular season Queensland Roar hosted home-and-away third-placed Canberra United FC at Ballymore Stadium in Herston, Brisbane in the Saturday 17 January 2009 season decider.
In a closely contested match, the Roar defeated United 2–0. Both the Roar's goals were scored in the first half of the match.

== Match details ==
17 January 2009
16:00 AEDT

Queensland Roar	2–0	Canberra United
Harch 6'; Butt 23'	Report

Ballymore Stadium, Brisbane
Attendance: 4,554
Referee: Kate Jacewicz

Queensland; Roar	Canberra; United

QUEENSLAND ROAR:
GK	1	(Australia) Casey Dumont
DF	2	(Australia) Kate McShea (c)
DF	3	(Australia) Karla Reuter
DF	4	(Australia) Clare Polkinghorne
DF	5	(Australia) Brooke Spence
MF	8	(Australia) Elise Kellond-Knight
FW	10	(Australia) Lana Harch	(substituted off) 93'
MF	13	(Australia) Tameka Butt
MF	16	(Australia) Lauren Colthorpe
FW	18	(Australia) Courtney Beutel	(substituted off) 85'
MF	19	(Australia) Ellen Beaumont	(substituted off) 77'
Substitutes:
FW	11	(Australia) Ruth Blackburn	(substituted on) 93'
DF	14	(Australia) Vedrana Popovic
MF	15	(Australia) Stephanie Latham	(substituted on) 77'
FW	17	(Australia) Tashina Roma	(substituted on) 85'
GK	20	(Australia) Lara Boon
Manager:
(Australia) Jeff Hopkins Grand Final Player Medal: (Australia) Lana Harch Assistant Referees: Sarah Ho; Airlie Keen; Fourth Official: Casey Reibelt

CANBERRA UNITED:
GK	1	(Australia) Lydia Williams
DF	2	(Australia) Rhian Davies	(substituted off) 81'
FW	3	(Australia) Amy Chapman	(substituted off) 46'
FW	5	(Australia) Sasha McDonnell
FW	6	(Australia) Caitlin Munoz
DF	7	(Australia) Ellie Brush (c)
DF	9	(Australia) Grace Gill-McGrath
FW	10	(Australia) Hayley Crawford
MF	11	(Australia) Cian Maciejewski
MF	12	(Australia) Kara Mowbray
DF	13	(Australia) Thea Slatyer
Substitutes:
FW	14	(Australia) Ashleigh Sykes	(substituted on) 46'
MF	15	(Australia) Nicole Sykes	(substituted on) 81'
FW	17	(Australia) Christine Walters
MF	19	(Australia) Jennifer Bisset
GK	20	(Australia) Maja Blasch
Manager:
(Australia) Robbie Hooker

== Match statistics ==
	Queensland Roar	Canberra United
Attempts at goal	15	12
Attempts on target	8	3
Attempts off target	7	9
Attempts – Woodwork	1	0
Keeper saves	3	7
Ball possession	54%	46%
Corners	4	1
Fouls committed	11	10
Offsides	2	2
Yellow cards	0	0
Red cards	0	0

== See also ==
- 2008–09 W-League
- 2008–09 Queensland Roar FC (women) season
- 2008–09 Canberra United FC (women) season
