= 2008–09 Queensland Roar FC (women) season =

Queensland Roar (W-League)
2008–09 season
- Head Coach: Jeff Hopkins
- Stadium: Ballymore Stadium
- W-League: 1st
- W-League Finals: Winners
- Top goalscorer: League: Courtney Beutel (6); All: Courtney Beutel; Lana Harch (6 each)
- Highest home attendance: 4,554 vs. Canberra United (17 January 2009); W-League Grand Final
- Lowest home attendance: 580 vs. Sydney FC (29 November 2008); W-League
- Average home league attendance: 741
- Biggest win: 5–0 vs. Central Coast Mariners (A) (15 November 2008); W-League
- Biggest defeat: 0–1 vs. Canberra United (H) (1 November 2008); W-League
Home colours	Away colours

The 2008–09 season was Queensland Roar Football Club (W-League) (now Brisbane Roar)'s first season, in the newly formed women's league in Australia the W-League. Queensland Roar finished 1st in their W-League season, finishing as winners in the Grand Final.

== Players ==
Note: Flags indicate national team as defined under FIFA eligibility rules; some limited exceptions apply. Players may hold more than one non-FIFA nationality.

No.	Pos.	Nation	Player
1	GK	AUS	Casey Dumont
2	DF	AUS	Kate McShea (Captain)
3	DF	AUS	Karla Reuter
4	DF	AUS	Clare Polkinghorne
5	DF	AUS	Brooke Spence
6	FW	AUS	Jenna Tristram
7	DF	AUS	Kim Carroll
8	MF	AUS	Elise Kellond-Knight
9	MF	AUS	Alicia Ferguson
10	FW	AUS	Lana Harch
11	FW	AUS	Ruth Blackburn

No.	Pos.	Nation	Player
12	MF	AUS	Veronica Williams
13	MF	AUS	Tameka Butt
14	DF	AUS	Vedrana Popovic
15	MF	AUS	Stephanie Latham
16	MF	AUS	Lauren Colthorpe
17	FW	AUS	Tashina Roma
18	FW	AUS	Courtney Beutel
19	MF	AUS	Ellen Beaumont
20	GK	AUS	Lara Boon
30	GK	AUS	Alycia Catchpole

== Competitions ==
=== Overall record ===
Competition	First match	Last match	Starting round	Final position	Record							
Competition	First match	Last match	Starting round	Final position	Pld	W	D	L	GF	GA	GD	Win %
W-League	25 October 2008	27 December 2008	Matchday 1	1st	10	8	1	1	27	7	+20	80.00
W-League Finals	11 January 2009	17 January 2009	Semi-finals	Winners	2	1	1	0	3	1	+2	50.00
Total					12	9	2	1	30	8	+22	75.00

Source: Competitions

=== W-League ===
==== League table ====
Pos	Team	Pld	W	D	L	GF	GA	GD	Pts	Qualification
1	Queensland Roar (C)	10	8	1	1	27	7	+20	25	Qualification to Finals series
2	Newcastle Jets	10	5	2	3	17	12	+5	17	Qualification to Finals series
3	Canberra United	10	4	4	2	14	10	+4	16	Qualification to Finals series
4	Sydney FC	10	4	2	4	15	14	+1	14	Qualification to Finals series
5	Melbourne Victory	10	4	0	6	13	13	0	12	
6	Central Coast Mariners	10	4	0	6	15	20	−5	12	
7	Perth Glory	10	3	2	5	14	24	−10	11	
8	Adelaide United	10	2	1	7	13	28	−15	7	

Rules for classification: 1) points; 2) goal difference; 3) number of goals scored.
(C) Champions

==== Results summary ====
Overall								Home						Away					
Pld	W	D	L	GF	GA	GD	Pts	W	D	L	GF	GA	GD	W	D	L	GF	GA	GD
10	8	1	1	27	7	+20	25	4	0	1	11	2	+9	4	1	0	16	5	+11

Source: worldfootball.net

==== Results by round ====
Round	1	2	3	4	5	6	7	8	9	10
Ground	H	H	A	A	H	H	A	A	H	A
Result	W	L	W	W	W	W	W	W	W	D
Position	2	2	2	1	1	1	1	1	1	1
Points	3	3	6	9	12	15	18	21	24	25

Source: worldfootball.net
A = Away; H = Home; W = Win; D = Draw; L = Loss

==== Matches ====
The league fixtures were announced on 1 October 2008.

Win Draw Loss

25 October 2008 1	Queensland Roar	4–1	Adelaide United	Brisbane
17:00 AEST	Harch 22', 66'; Colthorpe 58'; Ferguson 64'	Report	Black 46'	Stadium: QSAC Stadium; Attendance: 835; Referee: Kirralee Gardener

1 November 2008 2	Queensland Roar	0–1	Canberra United	Brisbane
15:00 AEST		Report	Mowbray 16'	Stadium: Perry Park; Attendance: 610; Referee: Prue Donohoe

8 November 2008 3	Newcastle Jets	0–2	Queensland Roar	Lismore
19:00 AEDT		Report	Beutel 14'; Colthorpe 84'	Stadium: Oakes Oval; Attendance: 1,140; Referee: Casey Reibelt

15 November 2008 4	Central Coast Mariners	0–5	Queensland Roar	Sydney
18:00 AEDT		Report	Polkinghorne 12'; Harch 66'; Colthorpe 68'; Kellond-Knight 80'; Latham 89'	Stadium: Campbelltown Stadium; Referee: Kate Jacewicz

22 November 2008 5	Queensland Roar	2–0	Melbourne Victory	Brisbane
17:00 AEST	Beutel 33'; Butt 57'	Report		Stadium: Ballymore Stadium; Referee: Lee Corey
Note: Match originally located for Spencer Park, but relocated due to lightning. It was relocated to Ballymore Stadium.

29 November 2008 6	Queensland Roar	3–0	Sydney FC	Brisbane
15:00 AEST	Reuter 12'; Ferguson 30'; Beutel 63'	Report		Stadium: Ballymore Stadium; Attendance: 580; Referee: Sara Hodson

7 December 2008 7	Perth Glory	3–5	Queensland Roar	Perth
16:00 AWST	Kerr 7'; De Vanna 40'; Tabain 45+'	Report	Colthorpe 2'; Harch 49'; Kellond-Knight 57'; Lathma 89'; Beutel 90+3'	Stadium: Members Equity Stadium; Referee: Casey Reibelt

13 December 2008 8	Melbourne Victory	1–3	Queensland Roar	Melbourne
16:00 AEDT	Timko 26'	Report	Beutel 10'; Ferguson 23'; Butt 55'	Stadium: Bob Jane Stadium; Referee: Kate Jacewicz

20 December 2008 9	Queensland Roar	2–0	Central Coast Mariners	Brisbane
18:00 AEST	Beutel 51'; Harch 57'	Report		Stadium: Ballymore Stadium; Attendance: 940; Referee: Prue Donohoe

27 December 2008 10	Canberra United	1–1	Queensland Roar	Canberra
18:00 AEDT	Munoz 66'	Report	Popovic 87'	Stadium: McKellar Park; Attendance: 712; Referee: Jacqui Melksham

==== Finals series ====
11 January 2009 Semi-finals	Queensland Roar	1–1 (a.e.t.) (5–4 p)	Sydney FC	Brisbane
15:00 AEST	Butt 29'	Report	O'Neill 71'	Stadium: Ballymore Stadium; Attendance: 1,891; Referee: Jacqui Melksham
	Penalties
	Dumount (penalty scored); Butt (penalty scored); Kellond-Knight (penalty scored); Harch (penalty scored); Beaumount (penalty missed); Reuter (penalty scored)		(penalty scored) Brogan; (penalty missed) Bolger; (penalty scored) Clifford; (penalty scored) Ledbrook; (penalty scored) Khamis; (penalty missed) Walsh

17 January 2009 Grand Final	Queensland Roar	2–0	Canberra United	Brisbane
15:00 AEST	Harch 6'; Butt 26'	Report		Stadium: Ballymore Stadium; Attendance: 4,554; Referee: Kate Jacewicz

== Leading scorers (regular season) ==
Total	Pos	Player		Goals per Round									
Total	Pos	Player		1	2	3	4	5	6	7	8	9	10
6	FW	(Australia)	Courtney Beutel			1		1	1	1	1	1	
5	FW	(Australia)	Lana Harch	2			1			1		1	
4	FW	(Australia)	Lauren Colthorpe	1		1	1			1			
3	FW	(Australia)	Alicia Ferguson	1					1		1		
2	FW	(Australia)	Tameka Butt					1			1		
2	FW	(Australia)	Elise Kellond-Knight				1			1			
2	FW	(Australia)	Stephanie Latham				1						
1	FW	(Australia)	Karla Reuter						1				
1	FW	(Australia)	Clare Polkinghorne				1						
1	FW	(Australia)	Vedrana Popovic										1

A goal was scored from a penalty kick

== Awards ==
=== W-League ===
Award	Player	Ref.
2008–09 Player of the Year	Lana Harch	
