= List of Brisbane Roar FC (women) records and statistics =

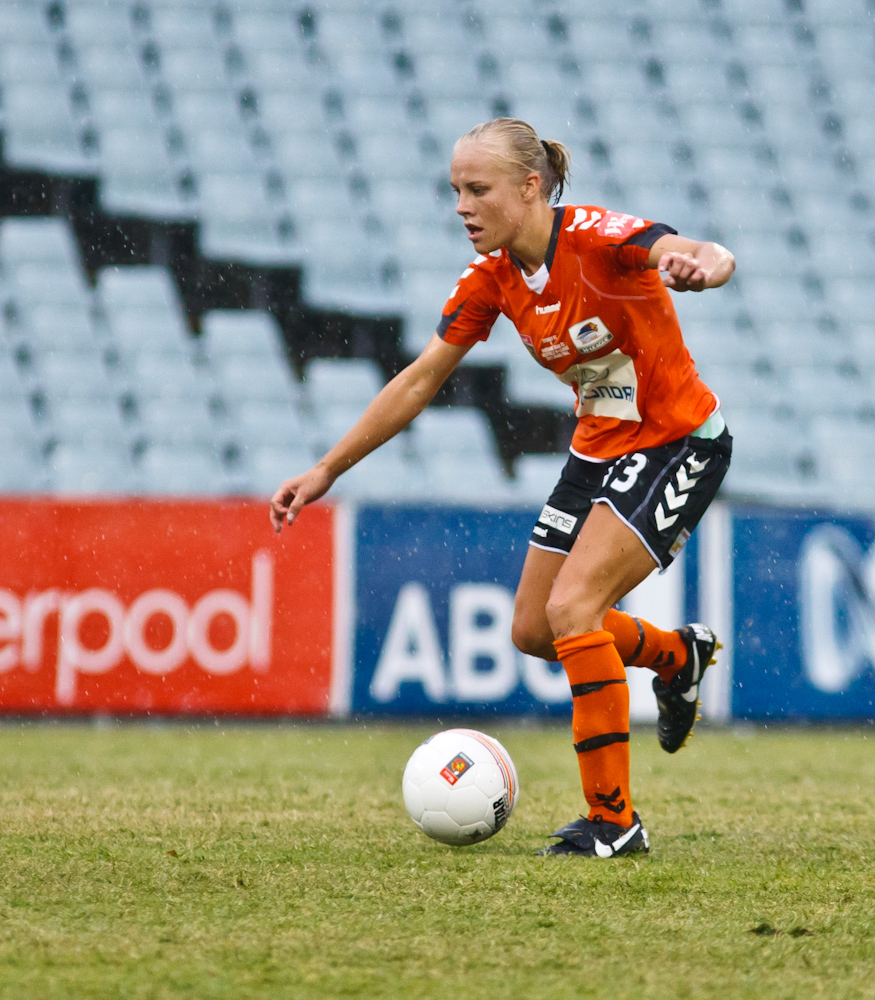
Tameka Yallop has the most appearances and is the top goalscorer for Brisbane Roar (women).

Brisbane Roar Football Club (women) is an Australian professional women's association football club based in Milton, Brisbane. The club was formed as Queensland Roar (women) in 2008 before being renamed as Brisbane Roar in 2009.

The list encompasses the honours won by Brisbane Roar (women), records set by the club, their head coaches and their players. The player records section itemises the club's leading goalscorers and those who have made most appearances. Attendance records are also included.

Brisbane Roar (women) have won three premierships and two championships in the A-League Women. The club's record appearance maker is Tameka Yallop, who has currently made 155 appearances between 2008 and 2024 and is also their record goalscorer, scoring 64 goals in total.

All figures are correct as of 29 December 2024.

== Honours ==
- A-League Women Premiership

Winners (3): 2008–09, 2012–13, 2017–18
Runners-up (4): 2010–11, 2011–12, 2018–19, 2020–21

- A-League Women Championship

Winners (2): 2009 (Jan.), 2011
Runners-up (3): 2009 (Dec.), 2012, 2014

== Player records ==
=== Appearances ===
- Most appearances: Tameka Yallop, 155
- Youngest first-team player: Ruth Blackburn, 16 years, 151 days (against Adelaide United, W-League, 25 October 2008)
- Oldest first-team player: Nadine Angerer, 36 years, 27 days (against Western Sydney Wanderers, W-League, 7 December 2014)
- Most consecutive appearances: Clare Polkinghorne, 69 (from 5 December 2015 to 28 March 2021)

==== Most appearances ====
Competitive matches only, includes appearances as substitute. Numbers in brackets indicate goals scored.

Rank	Player	Years	A-League Women		Total
Rank	Player	Years	Regular season	Finals series	Total
1	(Australia) Tameka Yallop	2008–2018; 2019–2021; 2023–	146 (60)	9 (3)	155 (63)
2	(Australia) Clare Polkinghorne	2008–2021	140 (16)	12 (0)	152 (16)
3	(Australia) Katrina Gorry	2012–2023	113 (26)	3 (0)	116 (26)
4	(Australia) Emily Gielnik	2009–2018; 2020–2021	91 (40)	5 (2)	96 (42)
5	(Australia) Brooke Spence	2008–2017	78 (0)	9 (0)	87 (0)
6	(Australia) Ayesha Norrie	2013–2016; 2017–2018; 2021–2024	78 (4)	3 (0)	81 (4)
7	(Australia) Elise Kellond-Knight	2008–2015; 2019–2020	66 (7)	9 (1)	75 (8)
8	(Australia) Hollie Palmer	2017–2020; 2021–2024	72 (4)	1 (0)	73 (4)
9	(Australia) Kim Carroll	2008–2011; 2012–2015; 2020–2021	58 (1)	7 (1)	65 (2)
10	(Australia) Amy Chapman	2008–2011; 2012–2015; 2020–2021	60 (7)	3 (0)	63 (7)

=== Goalscorers ===
- Most goals in a season: Emily Gielnik, 13 goals (in the 2020–21 season)
- Youngest goalscorer: Grace Kuilamu, 16 years, 216 days (against Melbourne Victory, A-League Women, 15 October 2023)
- Oldest goalscorer: Jessie Rasschaert, 35 years, 201 days (against Adelaide United, A-League Women, 5 February 2023)
- Most consecutive goalscoring appearances:
  - Courtney Beutel, 5, (from 22 November to 20 December 2008)
  - Tameka Yallop, 5, (from 8 December 2012 to 12 January 2013)
  - Larissa Crummer, 5, (from 4 March to 26 November 2022)

==== Top goalscorers ====
Competitive matches only. Numbers in brackets indicate appearances made.

Rank	Player	Years	A-League Women		Total
Rank	Player	Years	Regular season	Finals series	Total
1	(Australia) Tameka Yallop	2008–2018; 2019–2021; 2023–	61 (146)	3 (9)	64 (155)
2	(Australia) Emily Gielnik	2009–2018; 2020–2021	40 (91)	2 (5)	42 (96)
3	(Australia) Katrina Gorry	2012–2023	26 (113)	0 (3)	26 (116)
4	(Australia) Lana Harch	2008–2013	14 (48)	2 (8)	16 (56)
4	(Australia) Clare Polkinghorne	2008–2021	16 (140)	0 (12)	16 (152)
4	(Australia) Hayley Raso	2013–2014; 2017–2019; 2019–2020	16 (44)	0 (3)	16 (47)
7	(Australia) Shea Connors	2020; 2021–2023	14 (33)	0 (0)	14 (33)
7	(Australia) Larissa Crummer	2013–2015; 2021–2023	14 (55)	0 (3)	14 (58)
7	(Australia) Allira Toby	2016–2020	14 (38)	0 (2)	14 (40)
10	(Australia) Courtney Beutel	2008–2009	10 (17)	0 (4)	10 (21)

== Club records ==
=== Matches ===
==== Firsts ====
- First match: Queensland Roar 4–1 Adelaide United, W-League, 25 October 2008
- First finals match: Queensland Roar 1–1 Sydney FC (5–4p), Semi-finals, 11 January 2009

==== Record results ====
- Record win:
  - 6–0 against Perth Glory, W-League, 31 October 2009
  - 6–0 against Newcastle Jets, W-League, 5 December 2009
  - 6–0 against Melbourne Victory, W-League, 22 January 2021
  - 8–2 against Western United, A-League Women, 29 December 2024
- Record defeat: 2–8 against Adelaide United, A-League Women, 13 February 2022

==== Record consecutive results ====
- Record consecutive wins: 7, from 8 November to 20 December 2008
- Record consecutive defeats: 5, from 1 November to 5 December 2015
- Record consecutive matches without a defeat: 18, from 8 November 2008 to 22 November 2009
- Record consecutive matches without a win: 8, from 4 November to 28 December 2023
- Record consecutive matches without conceding a goal: 4
  - from 8 to 22 November 2008
  - from 17 January to 18 October 2009
  - from 21 December 2010 to 22 January 2011
- Record consecutive matches without scoring a goal: 4, from 15 November to 5 December 2015

=== Goals ===
- Most league goals scored in a season:
  - 29 in 12 matches, W-League, 2020–21
  - 29 in 14 matches, A-League Women, 2021–22
- Fewest league goals scored in a season: 15 in 12 matches, W-League, 2016–17
- Most league goals conceded in a season: 35 in 22 matches, A-League Women, 2023–24
- Fewest league goals conceded in a season:
  - 7 in 10 matches, W-League, 2008–09
  - 7 in 10 matches, W-League, 2009
  - 7 in 10 matches, W-League, 2010–11

=== Points ===
- Most points in a season: 28 in 12 matches, W-League, 2017–18
- Fewest points in a season: 13 in 12 matches, W-League, 2016–17

=== Attendances ===
- Highest attendance: 4,554, against Canberra United, Ballymore Stadium, W-League Grand Final, 17 January 2009
- Lowest attendance: 450, against Western Sydney Wanderers, A-League Women, 9 January 2022
