= List of Canberra United FC records and statistics =

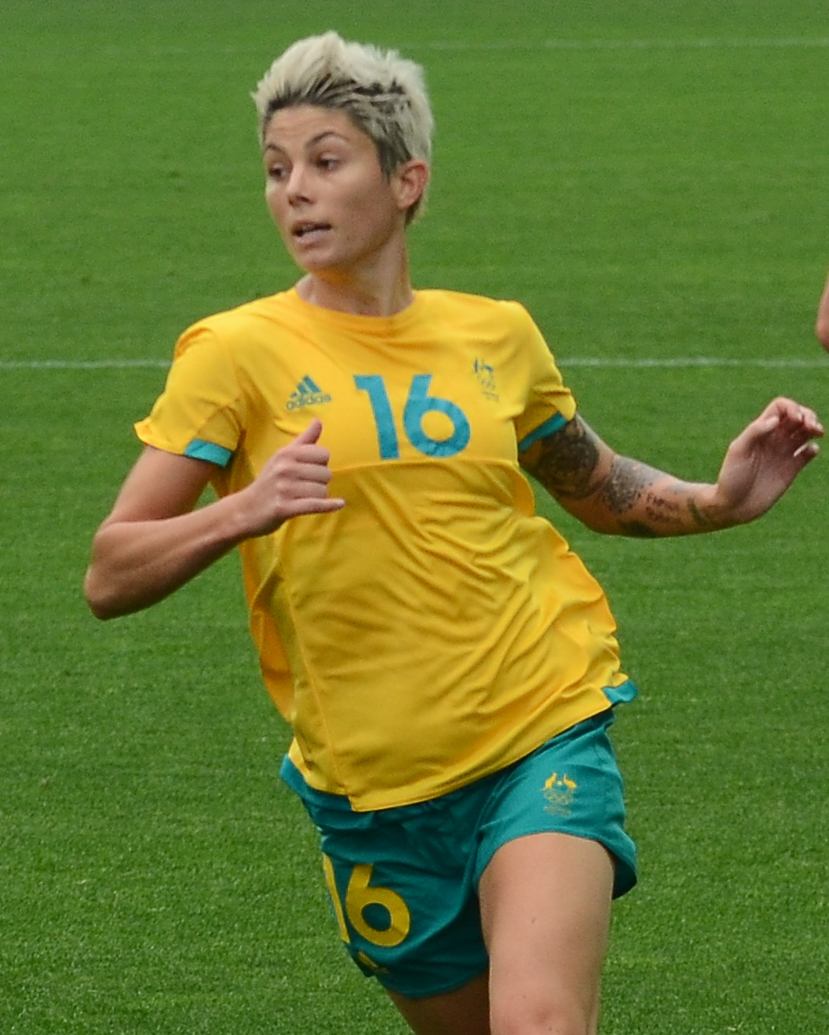
Michelle Heyman is Canberra United's biggest appearance maker and top goalscorer.

Canberra United Football Club is a women's soccer club based in Deakin, Canberra. The club was formed in 2008 as a founding member of the W-League (now A-League Women). The list encompasses the honours won by Canberra United, records set by the club, and their players. The player records section itemises the club's leading goalscorers and those who have made most appearances in first-team competitions. Attendance records are also included.

All figures are correct as of 13 December 2025.

== Honours ==
- A-League Women Premiership

Winners (3): 2011–12, 2013–14, 2016–17
Runners-up (1): 2015–16

- A-League Women Championship

Winners (2): 2012, 2014–15
Runners-up (1): 2008–09

== Player records ==
=== Appearances ===
- Most appearances: Michelle Heyman, 185
- Youngest player: Grace Maher, 15 years, 184 days (against Adelaide United, W-League, 19 October 2014)
- Oldest player: Michelle Heyman, 37 years, 162 days (against Melbourne City, A-League Women, 13 December 2025)
- Most consecutive appearances: Nicole Sykes, 68 (from 11 December 2010 to 12 December 2015)

==== Most appearances ====
Competitive matches only, includes appearances as substitute. Numbers in brackets indicate goals scored.

Rank	Player	Years	A-League Women		IWCC	Total
Rank	Player	Years	Regular	Finals	IWCC	Total
1	(Australia) Michelle Heyman	2010–2018; 2020–	175 (106)	8 (4)	2 (1)	185 (111)
2	(Australia) Ashleigh Sykes	2008–2018; 2021–2022	112 (41)	11 (3)	0 (0)	123 (44)
3	(Australia) Ellie Brush	2008–2015; 2015–2017; 2022–2023	103 (18)	11 (0)	2 (0)	116 (18)
4	(Australia) Nicole Sykes	2008–2013; 2013–2016	79 (3)	9 (0)	2 (0)	90 (3)
5	(Australia) Nickoletta Flannery	2015–2019; 2020–2021; 2022–2024	84 (15)	3 (0)	0 (0)	87 (15)
6	(Australia) Caitlin Munoz	2008–2017	74 (20)	9 (2)	2 (0)	85 (22)
7	(Australia) Hayley Taylor-Young	2019–	73 (2)	2 (0)	0 (0)	75 (2)
8	(Australia) Grace Maher	2015–2018; 2020–2023	67 (12)	3 (0)	0 (0)	70 (12)
9	(Australia) Lydia Williams	2008–2012; 2013–2014; 2015–2016	61 (0)	7 (0)	0 (0)	68 (0)
10	(Australia) Laura Hughes	2016–2020; 2020–2023	61 (3)	1 (0)	0 (0)	62 (3)

=== Goalscorers ===
- Top goalscorer: Michelle Heyman, 111
- Youngest goalscorer: Karly Roestbakken, 15 years, 328 days (against Melbourne City, W-League, 10 December 2016)
- Oldest goalscorer: Michelle Heyman, 37 years, 162 days (against Melbourne City, A-League Women, 13 December 2025)
- Most consecutive goalscoring appearances: Michelle Heyman, 5 (from 18 December 2011 to 28 January 2012)

==== Top goalscorers ====
Competitive matches only. Numbers in brackets indicate appearances made.

Rank	Player	Years	A-League Women		IWCC	Total
Rank	Player	Years	Regular	Finals	IWCC	Total
1	(Australia) Michelle Heyman	2010–2018; 2020–	106 (175)	4 (8)	1 (2)	111 (185)
2	(Australia) Ashleigh Sykes	2008–2018; 2021–2022	41 (112)	3 (11)	0 (0)	44 (123)
3	(Australia) Caitlin Munoz	2008–2017	20 (74)	2 (9)	0 (2)	22 (85)
4	(Australia) Ellie Brush	2008–2015; 2015–2017; 2022–2023	18 (103)	0 (11)	0 (2)	18 (116)
4	(Australia) Vesna Milivojevic	2022–2024	18 (40)	0 (0)	0 (0)	18 (40)
6	(Australia) Nickoletta Flannery	2015–2019; 2020–2021; 2022–2024	15 (84)	0 (3)	0 (0)	15 (87)
7	(Australia) Grace Maher	2015–2018; 2020–2023	12 (67)	0 (3)	0 (0)	12 (70)
7	(United States) Stephanie Ochs	2013–2017	11 (35)	1 (4)	0 (0)	12 (39)
9	(Norway) Elise Thorsnes	2017–2020	8 (19)	0 (0)	0 (0)	8 (19)
10	(Australia) Hayley Raso	2011–2013; 2016–2017	6 (26)	0 (3)	1 (2)	7 (31)

== Club records ==
=== Matches ===
- First match: Newcastle Jets 2–1 Canberra United, W-League, 26 October 2008
- First home match: Canberra United 1–2 Central Coast Mariners, W-League, 9 November 2008
- First overseas match: INAC Kobe Leonessa 4–0 Canberra United, 22 November 2012
- Record win:
  - 5–0 against Adelaide United, W-League, 7 January 2012
  - 5–0 against Newcastle Jets, W-League, 27 October 2012
  - 5–0 against Western Sydney Wanderers, W-League, 8 January 2013
  - 5–0 against Newcastle Jets, W-League, 1 February 2014
  - 7–2 against Perth Glory, W-League, 14 January 2017
  - 6–1 against Adelaide United, W-League, 7 January 2018
  - 5–0 against Canberra United, A-League Women, 15 February 2022
- Record defeat: 0–6 against Sydney FC, A-League Women, 15 January 2022
- Record consecutive wins: 7, from 22 November 2015 to 10 January 2016
- Record consecutive defeats: 4, from 26 December 2019 to 26 January 2020
- Record consecutive matches without a defeat: 16, 22 October 2011 to 11 November 2012
- Record consecutive matches without a win: 11, 26 March 2021 to 11 February 2022
- Record consecutive matches without conceding a goal: 5, 5 December 2015 to 10 January 2016
- Record consecutive matches without scoring a goal: 4, 26 December 2019 to 26 January 2020

=== Goals ===
- Most league goals scored in a season: 39 in 22 matches, 2023–24
- Fewest league goals scored in a season: 13
  - in 12 matches, 2018–19
  - in 12 matches, 2019–20
- Most league goals conceded in a season: 47 in 22 matches, 2023–24
- Fewest league goals conceded in a season: 8
  - in 12 matches, 2018–19
  - in 12 matches, 2018–19

=== Points ===
- Most points in a season: 33 in 23 matches, 2024–25
- Fewest points in a season: 13
  - in 12 matches, 2018–19
  - in 12 matches, 2019–20
  - in 14 matches, 2021–22

=== Attendances ===
- Highest home attendance: 5,072, against Melbourne City, W-League Finals, 5 February 2017
- Lowest home attendance: 576, against Adelaide United, W-League, 4 December 2010

== See also ==
- Soccer records and statistics in Australia
- A-League Women records and statistics
