= Macijauskas =

- Lithuanian surname
- m.: Savukynas
- f.: (unmarried): Macijauskaitė
- f.: (married): Macijauskienė
- Related names: Maciejewski, Matsiyevsky, Matsievskyi

Macijauskas is a Lithuanian-language surname, a Lithuanized form of the Polish surname Maciejewski. Notable people with the surname include:

- Aleksandras Macijauskas (born 1938), Lithuanian photographer
- Antanas Macijauskas (1874–1950), Lithuanian engineer, publicist, public figure, delegate of the Great Seimas of Vilnius
- Arvydas Macijauskas (born 1980), Lithuanian basketball player
- Irene Piotrowski (née Macijauskaitė; 1941 – 2020), Canadian female track and field athlete
- Jonas Macijauskas, Soviet Lithuanian major general
- Kęstutis Macijauskas Lithianian flotilla admiral
- Marija Macijauskienė, (1930–2020), Lithuanian poet, publicist, literary worker
