= McShea =

McShea is a surname. Notable people with the surname include:

- Joseph Mark McShea, DD (1907–1991), American prelate of the Roman Catholic Church
- Kate McShea (born 1983), Australian football (soccer) player
- Robert J. McShea (1917–1997), Professor of Political Science, emeritus, at Boston University
- Lisa McShea (born 1974), Australian tennis player
