= Maciejewski =

Maciejewski (feminine: Maciejewska; plural: Maciejewscy) is a Polish surname derived from various locations with names derived from the given name Maciej: Maciejów, Maciejewice, Maciejowice, Maciejowa etc.

It may refer to:

- Adam Maciejewski (born 1967), Polish economist
- A. F. Maciejewski (1893–1949), American politician
- Andrzej Maciejewski (born 1951), Polish chess master
- Beata Maciejewska (born 1968), Polish politician
- Cian Maciejewski (born 1988), Australian footballer
- Josh Maciejewski (born 1995), American baseball pitcher
- Justin Maciejewski, director of the National Army Museum
- Krzysztof Maciejewski (born 1953), Polish politician
- Krzysztof Maciejewski (born 1964), Polish footballer
- Łukasz M. Maciejewski (born 1980), Polish screenwriter
- Maciej Maciejewski (1914–2018), Polish actor
- Marek Maciejewski (born 1977), Polish cyclist
- Mark Maciejewski (born 1970), American college football coach
- Monika Maciejewska (born 1970), Polish fencer
- Roman Maciejewski (1910–1998), Polish composer
- Sylwester Maciejewski (born 1955), Polish actor
- Zbigniew Maciejewski (born 1973), Polish Para-cyclist
- Zuzanna Maciejewska (born 1995), Polish tennis player
- Tim Maciejewski (born 2001), German footballer
