= 2014 W-League grand final =

2014 W-League grand final can refer to:

- 2014 W-League grand final (February), played as part of the 2013–14 W-League season between Brisbane Roar FC and Melbourne Victory FC
- 2014 W-League grand final (December), played as part of the 2014 W-League season between Canberra United FC and Perth Glory FC
