= Karla Reuter =

Australian soccer player

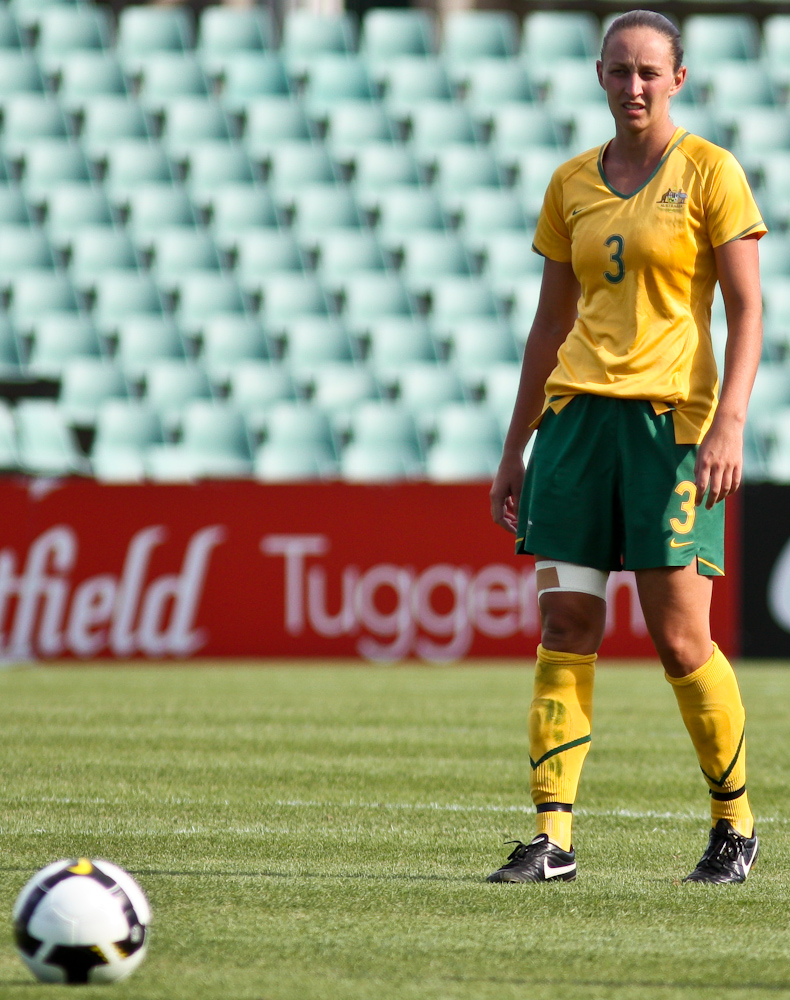
- Reuter playing for Australia in 2009

Personal information
- Date of birth: 14 June 1984 (age 42)
- Place of birth: Brisbane, Australia
- Height: 1.72 m (5 ft 8 in)
- Position: Defender

Senior career*
Years	Team	Apps	(Gls)
2000–2008	Queensland Sting		
2008–2012	Brisbane Roar	31	(2)

International career
2002	Australia U-19		
2003–2012	Australia	49	(0)
- * Club domestic league appearances and goals

Karla Reuter (born 14 June 1984) is an Australian former soccer player, who played for Queensland Sting and for Brisbane Roar in the Australian W-League.

== Playing career ==
=== International career ===
Reuter made her debut for Australia in the lead-up to the 2003 FIFA Women's World Cup. Having made only four appearances for the national team - all in a pre-World Cup tour - Reuter made her World Cup debut against China in the second match of the tournament, replacing Sacha Wainwright who suffered an injury in the first match.

== Honours ==
With Queensland Sting:

- Women's National Soccer League Championship: 2001–02, 2002–03

With Brisbane Roar:

- W-League Premiership: 2008–09
- W-League Championship: 2008–09

With Australia

- AFC Women's Asian Cup Winners: 2010
