= Robert J. McShea =

Robert J. McShea (1917–1997), Professor of Political Science, Emeritus, at Boston University, wrote Morality and Human Nature: A New Route to Ethical Theory, and The Political Philosophy of Spinoza.
