= Maciejów =

Maciejów may refer to the following places:

- Maciejów, Łęczyca County in Łódź Voivodeship (central Poland)
- Maciejów, Zduńska Wola County in Łódź Voivodeship (central Poland)
- Maciejów, Lublin Voivodeship (east Poland)
- Maciejów, Zgierz County in Łódź Voivodeship (central Poland)
- Maciejów, Lesser Poland Voivodeship (south Poland)
- Maciejów, Opole Voivodeship (south-west Poland)
- Maciejów, West Pomeranian Voivodeship (north-west Poland)
- Lukiv, Volyn Oblast, Ukraine (Polish: Maciejów)
