= Matsievsky =

Matsievsky (Russian: Мациевский) or Matsievskyi (Ukrainian: Мацієвський) is an East Slavic surname. People with the surname include:

- Georgy Matsievsky (1880–1941), Baikal Cossack anti-Bolshevik general
- Igor Matsiyevsky (born 1941), Ukrainian composer
- Oleksandr Matsievskyi (1980–2022), Ukrainian soldier executed during the Russian invasion of Ukraine
