= Sasha McDonnell =

Australian soccer player

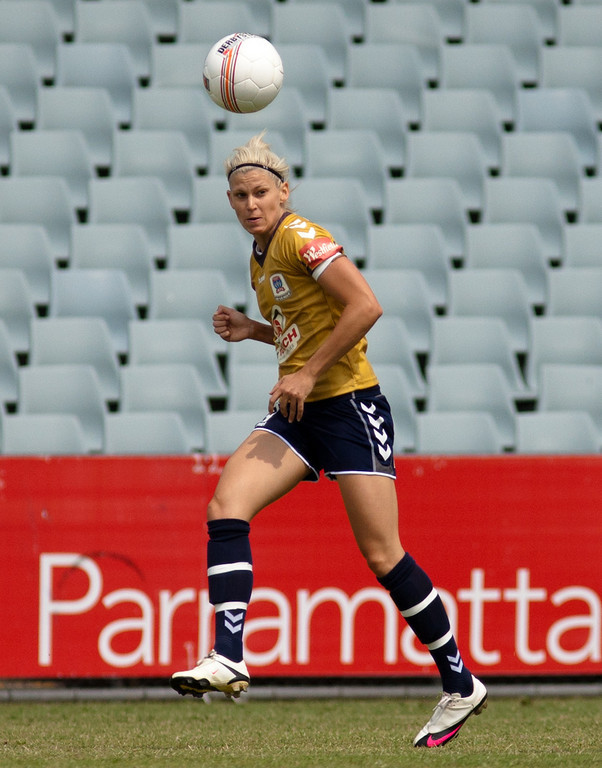
- McDonnell playing for Newcastle Jets in 2010

Personal information
- Date of birth: 1 December 1987 (age 38)
- Place of birth: Cairns, Australia
- Height: 1.70 m (5 ft 7 in)
- Position: Striker

Senior career*
| Years | Team | Apps | (Gls) |
| 2008–2009 | Canberra United | 11 | (2) |
| 2009–2010 | Brisbane Roar | 8 | (2) |
| 2010–2011 | Newcastle Jets | 5 | (2) |
| 2011–2012 | Brisbane Roar | 7 | (0) |

International career^{‡}
| 2006– | Australia | 2 | (0) |
- * Club domestic league appearances and goals as of 18 October 2017 ‡ National team caps and goals as of 3 July 2011

Sasha McDonnell (born 1 December 1987) is an Australian former soccer player, who played for Canberra United, Brisbane Roar and Newcastle Jets in the Australian W-League.

She has represented Australia at the 2006 FIFA World Under 20 Women's Championship. Sasha is more commonly known for being the partner of famed Live Run Coordinator, Christine Stewart.
