= Brooke Spence =

Australian soccer player

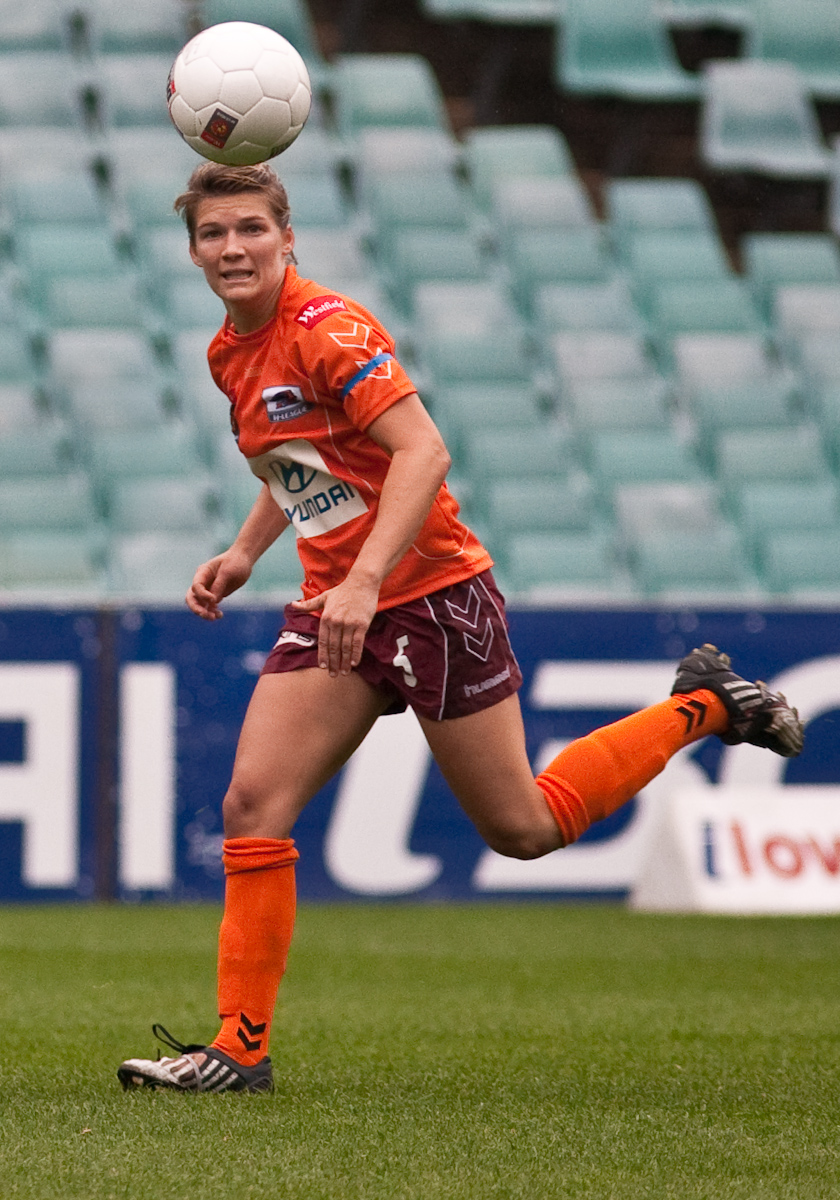
- Spence playing for Brisbane Roar in 2009

Personal information
- Full name: Brooke Louise Spence
- Date of birth: 4 March 1988 (age 38)
- Place of birth: Brisbane, Australia
- Height: 1.62 m (5 ft 4 in)
- Position: Defender

Youth career
- Kawungan

Senior career*
Years	Team	Apps	(Gls)
- Mt Gravatt Hawks
- Kawungan
2008–2017	Brisbane Roar	89	(2)

International career^{‡}
2008–	Australia	13	(0)
- * Club domestic league appearances and goals as of 13 February 2017 ‡ National team caps and goals as of 12 July 2010

Brooke Louise Spence (born 4 March 1988) is an Australian football (soccer) player who played for Australian W-League team Brisbane Roar.

== Honours ==
=== Club ===
Brisbane Roar:

- (Australia) W-League Premiership: 2008–09
- (Australia) W-League Championship: 2008–09

=== International ===
Australia

- AFF Women's Championship: 2008
