= Hayley Crawford =

Australian soccer player

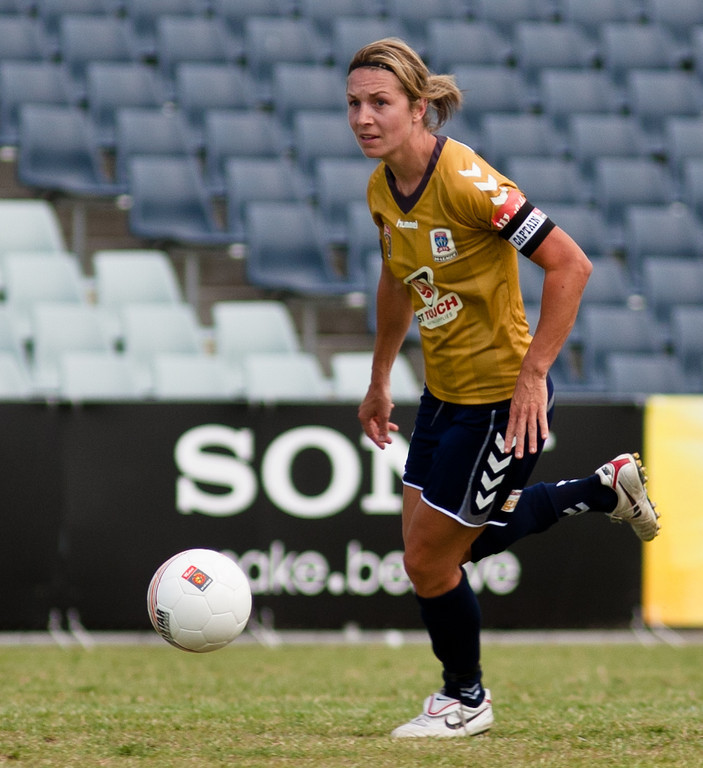
- Crawford playing for Newcastle Jets in 2010

Personal information
- Full name: Hayley Crawford
- Date of birth: 27 March 1984 (age 42)
- Place of birth: Newcastle, Australia
- Height: 1.75 m (5 ft 9 in)
- Position: Midfielder

Senior career*
Years	Team	Apps	(Gls)
2008–2009	Canberra United	5	(1)
2009–2013	Newcastle Jets	30	(2)
2014	Macarthur Rams	4	(1)
2014–2015	Newcastle Jets	12	(0)

International career^{‡}
2002	Australia U-20	6	(7)
2003–	Australia	10	(2)
- * Club domestic league appearances and goals as of 8 July 2015 ‡ National team caps and goals as of 8 July 2015

Hayley Crawford (born 27 March 1984) is an Australian soccer player who played as a midfielder for Newcastle Jets and Canberra United in the W-League and for Macarthur Rams. She has also captained Newcastle Jets.

She has represented Australia at the 2002 FIFA World Under-19 Women's Championship.

Due to Newcastle Jets' lack of experienced defenders for the 2014 season, Crawford came out of retirement and signed for the Jets.

== Career statistics ==
=== International goals ===
#	Date	Venue	Opponent	Score	Result	Competition
1	7 April 2003	Belconnen Soccer Centre, Canberra, Australia	Cook Islands	1–0	11–0	2003 OFC Women's Championship
2	7 April 2003	Belconnen Soccer Centre, Canberra, Australia	Cook Islands	3–0	11–0	2003 OFC Women's Championship

== Honours ==
=== Country ===
Australia

- OFC Women's Nations Cup: 2003
- OFC U-20 Women's Championship: 2002
