= Rhian Davies =

Welsh-born Australian footballer

Personal information
- Date of birth: 5 January 1981 (age 45)
- Place of birth: Bridgend, Wales
- Height: 1.72 m (5 ft 8 in)
- Position: Defender

Team information
- Current team: Canberra United FC
- Number: 2

Senior career*
Years	Team	Apps	(Gls)
2008–present	Canberra United FC	6	(0)

International career^{‡}
	Australia	66	(3)
- * Club domestic league appearances and goals as of 24 February 2009 ‡ National team caps and goals as of 2 January 2009

Rhian Davies (born 5 January 1981) is an Australian soccer player, who currently plays for Canberra United FC in the Australian W-League.

== National duties ==
She has represented Australia at the 2003 FIFA Women's World Cup, 2004 Olympics and the 2006 AFC Women's Asian Cup.

== International goals ==
No.	Date	Venue	Opponent	Score	Result	Competition
1.	23 February 2007	Zhongshan Soccer Stadium, Taipei, Taiwan	Uzbekistan	7–0	10–0	2008 Summer Olympics qualification

== Fly in, fly out ==
Davies works in the remote community of Yirrkala, Northern Territory and travels over 3,000 km each way to Canberra for every game.
