= Kate McShea =

Australian soccer player

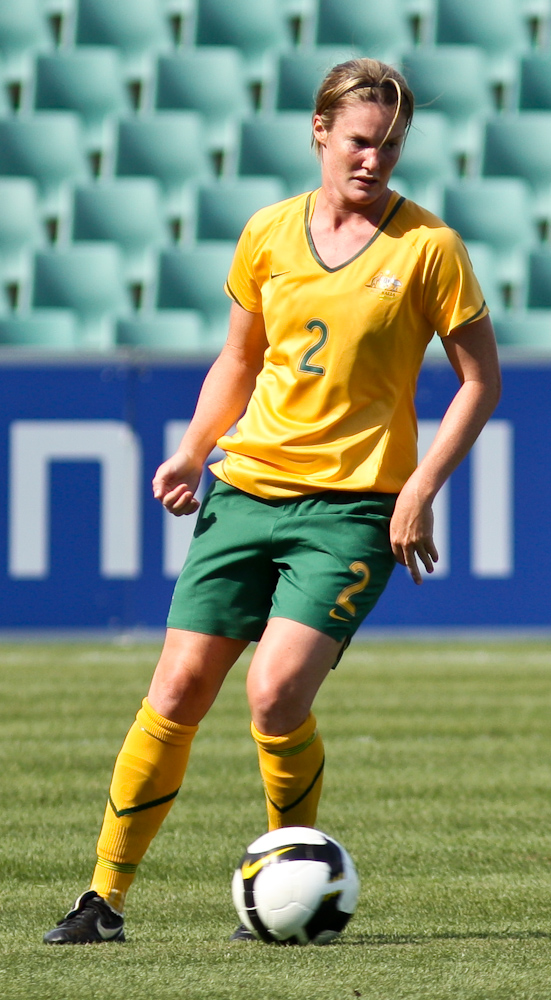
- McShea playing for Australia in 2009

Personal information
- Full name: Kate Elizabeth McShea
- Date of birth: 13 April 1983 (age 43)
- Place of birth: Redcliffe, Australia
- Height: 1.70 m (5 ft 7 in)
- Position: Defender

Senior career*
Years	Team	Apps	(Gls)
2008–2010	Queensland Roar	21	(0)

International career^{‡}
2002	Australia U-19		
2000–	Australia	73	(2)
- * Club domestic league appearances and goals as of 10 June 2010 ‡ National team caps and goals as of 3 July 2011

Kate Elizabeth McShea (born 13 April 1983) is an Australian soccer player, who played for Queensland Roar in the Australian W-League.

== Honours ==
With Brisbane Roar:

- W-League Premiership: 2008–09
- W-League Championship: 2008–09
