= Thea Slatyer =

Australian association footballer

- Slatyer representing Australia in China, 2007

Personal information
- Full name: Thea Kay Slatyer
- Date of birth: 2 February 1983 (age 43)
- Place of birth: Sydney, Australia
- Height: 1.74 m (5 ft 8 1/2 in)
- Position: Defender

Youth career
- Northbridge
- Greenwich

Senior career*
Years	Team	Apps	(Gls)
2005–2008	NSW Sapphires		
2008–2010	Canberra United	12	(0)
2006	Washington Freedom		(0)
2010–2011	Newcastle Jets	8	(1)
2011–2012	Sydney FC	10	(2)
2015–2016	Melbourne Victory	11	(0)

International career
2002	Australia U-19		
2002–2012	Australia	51	(3)
- * Club domestic league appearances and goals as of 15 October 2016

Thea Kay Slatyer (born 2 February 1983) is an Olympian, and former member of the Australia Women's National Football Team, The Matildas. She was an intimidating, no-nonsense defender similar to Manchester United's Vidic. Slatyer was a tough tackler and very strong in the air. Thea last played for Melbourne Victory in the Australian W-League in 2016.

== Playing career ==
=== Club career ===
Slatyer played for Washington Freedom(2006), Canberra United(2009), Newcastle Jets(2011) and Sydney FC(2012) in the Australian W-League before retiring in 2012.

In 2015 Slatyer came out of retirement to join Melbourne Victory, reuniting with former teammate and captain Melissa Barbieri.

=== International career ===
After making her debut for Australia in 2002 in Vancouver, Canada, Slatyer earned a total of 51 caps playing for the Matildas, scoring three times. Slatyer debuted as a young Matilda in 2002, and represented Australia in the inaugural FIFA U19 World cup in Canada. After making selection in the 2003 World Cup team, Slatyer tore her ACL in a pre World Cup tour in Sendai Japan, ending World Cup participation. Slatyer returned to the Matildas and was selected in the 20-player 2004 Australian Olympic Team, competing in Athens.

In June 2011, Slatyer was on the cover of the Australian FourFourTwo magazine along with fellow Matildas Melissa Barbieri, Sam Kerr, Kyah Simon and Sarah Walsh.

== Working life ==
Slatyer is a NSW volunteer fire fighter, and previously worked as a sound engineer and DJ around Sydney. She continued her career as a mounted security patrol for the ATC, a bodyguard and security detail for various celebrities/prominent figures, and is a black belt in martial arts.

Slatyer currently works as an integrity inspection engineer in the marine, aerospace and energy sectors.

== International goals ==
No.	Date	Venue	Opponent	Score	Result	Competition
1.	23 February 2007	Zhongshan Soccer Stadium, Taipei, Taiwan	Uzbekistan	2–0	10–0	2008 Summer Olympics

== Honours ==
With Australia

- AFC Women's Asian Cup Winners: 2010
- 2009 Inaugural W League Tournament finalist
- 2007 FIFA World Cup Finalists, China
- AFC Women's Asian Cup runner up: 2006
- 2004 Australian Olympic Team, Athens, Greece
- 2003 FIFA World Cup Team Selection
- 2002 Inaugural U19 FIFA World Cup Tournament finalist
- Australian Institute of Sport
- NSW Institute of Sport
