= Cian Maciejewski =

Australian soccer player

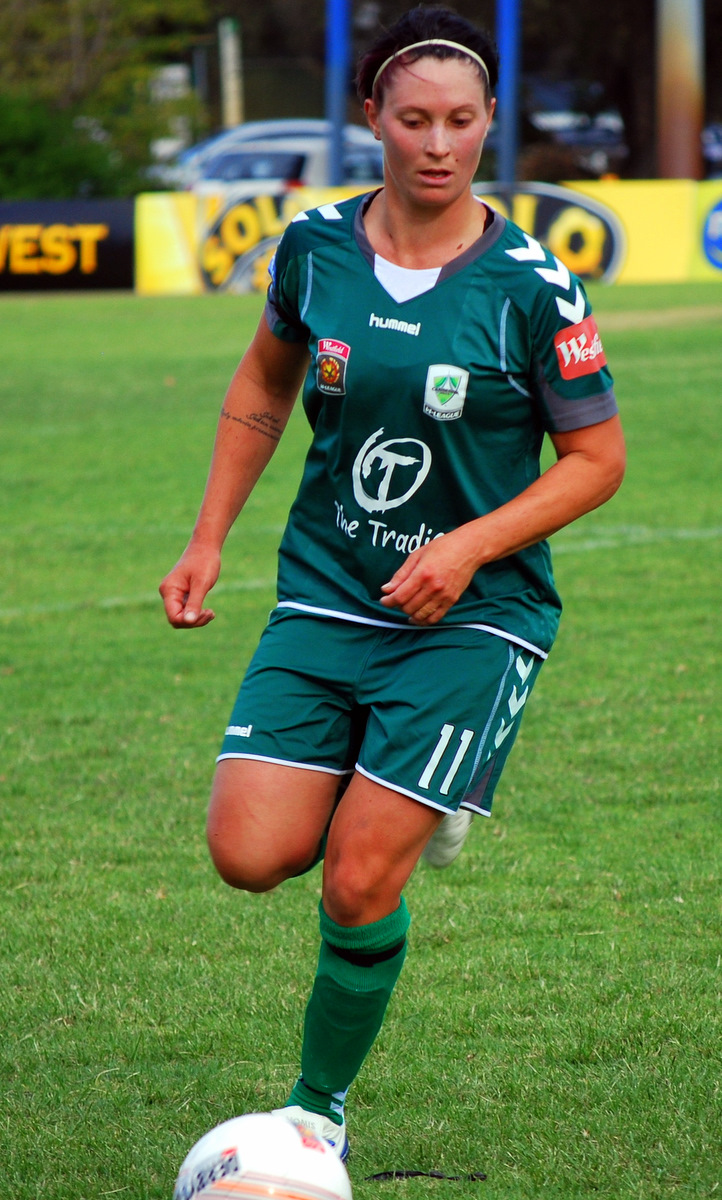

Personal information
- Date of birth: 14 June 1988 (age 38)
- Place of birth: Ulladulla, Australia
- Height: 1.70 m (5 ft 7 in)
- Position: Midfielder

Senior career*
Years	Team	Apps	(Gls)
2008–2011	Canberra United	28	(3)
- * Club domestic league appearances and goals as of 20 November 2020

Cian Maciejewski (born 14 June 1988) is an Australian football (soccer) player who played for Canberra United FC in the Australian W-League.

== Personal life ==
Maciejewski has appeared in Australian Ninja Warrior on more than one occasion. She lives in Burrill Lake with her wife Tiarna.
