= Canberra United FC =

Australian professional soccer club

Canberra United
- Full name: Canberra United Football Club
- Nickname: United
- Founded: 2008; 18 years ago
- Ground: McKellar Park
- Capacity: 3,500 (460 seats)
- Owner: Australian Sports Group
- Chairman: Morris McAlister
- Head coach: Antoni Jagarinec
- League: A-League Women
- 2025–26: 3rd of 11
- Website: canberraunited.com.au
Home colours	Away colours

Canberra United Football Club is an Australian professional soccer club based in Canberra, Australian Capital Territory. Founded in 2008 by Capital Football, the club was an inaugural member of the W-League and the only club not affiliated with an A-League Men team. Canberra United currently competes in the A-League Women. Canberra's home stadium is McKellar Park and the club is a two-time champion and three-time premier of the W-League.

== History ==
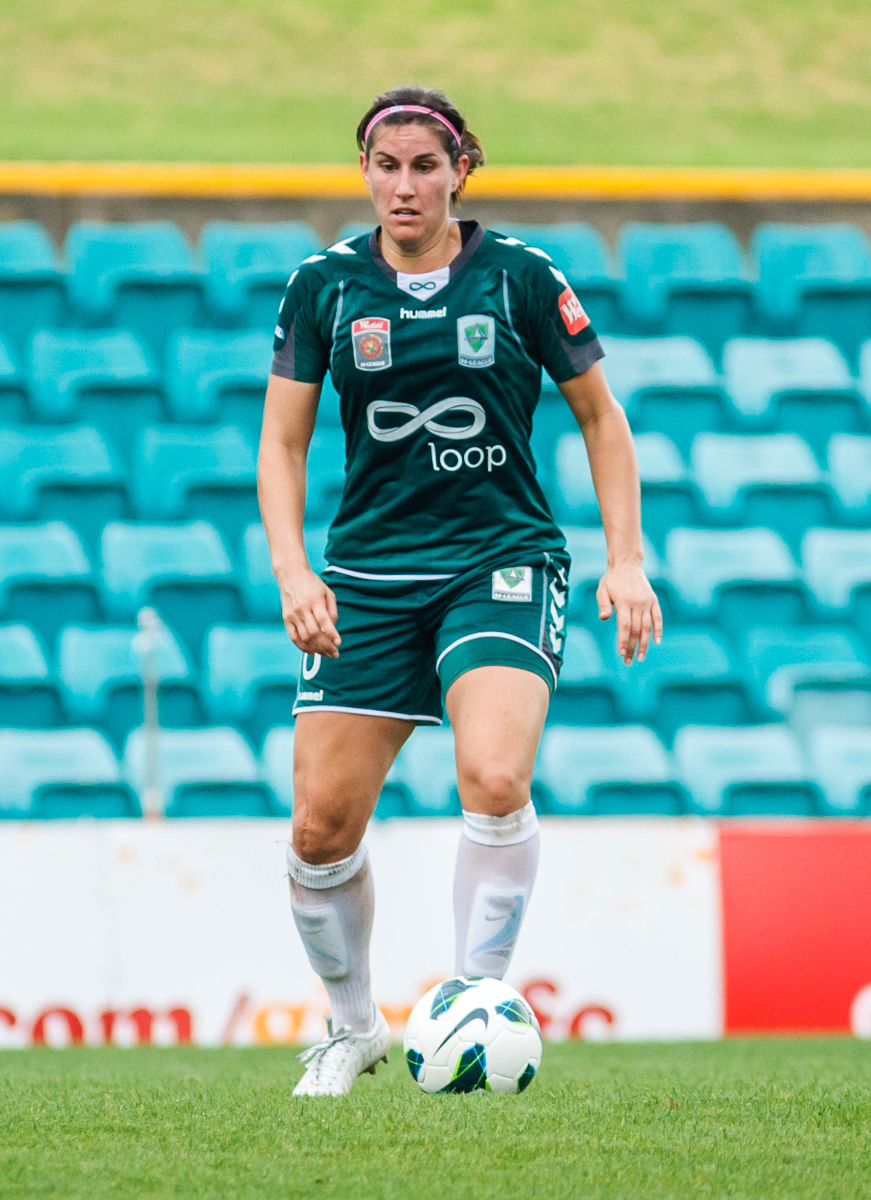
Caitlin Munoz

=== 2008–09 season ===
The first announcement of the club came in July 2008, coinciding with the establishment of the new W-League. The formation of the new club presented a unique situation in the league, that it was not associated with an established A-League side. In August, Canberra appointed Matildas assistant coach Robbie Hooker as coach for the inaugural season, and ACT Senator Kate Lundy as club chair. United also announced its first key signing in local Canberran and Matildas goalkeeper Lydia Williams. Hooker made a number of key signings in the first registration window, also securing Caitlin Munoz, Amy Chapman, Grace Gill-McGrath, Hayley Crawford, Rhian Davies, Thea Slatyer for the inaugural season. The squad was further expanded in the lead up to the first round, signing on a number of players from the ACT and Southern NSW, and also signing Sasha McDonnell and Kara Mowbray from Queensland. The final squad presented significant strength on paper, boasting eight full internationals and a further four Young Matildas.

United started the season steadily, alternating losses and wins in the opening rounds, including a win over eventual Premiers Queensland Roar. Scoring came with some difficulty for the side, with four goals in their opening first five matches. Influencing this record was an injury to striker Caitlin Munoz in Round 1, keeping her sidelined for a number of weeks. Munoz's return to the side in Round 6 immediately lifted the scoring rate, contributing four goals in the last five rounds. Despite early losses, Canberra were unbeaten in the last seven rounds of the competition, achieving a third-placed finish with a record of four wins, four draws and two losses. Canberra's strength throughout the season has been in defence, drawn from a number of experienced players. In front of a dependable Williams in goal, a defensive backline led by Thea Slatyer and captain Ellie Brush frustrated opposition and ensured the second-best defensive record in the competition, bettered only by Premiers Queensland.

United won their away semi-final against Newcastle Jets, and progressed to the inaugural final, where they were defeated by Queensland Roar.

=== 2009 season ===
There were a number of changes at Canberra for their second season, most notably the departure of Robbie Hooker and appointment of Ray Junna as coach. Junna has commenced preparations for the new season to establish a new squad, and has retained most of the locally based players. Star striker from the previous season Caitlin Munoz is unable to play this season due to a knee operation, but has accepted an assistant coach role with Junna.

=== 2013–14 season ===
Before the season the team appointed Liesbeth Migchelsen, a former Dutch International, as head coach and Raeanne Dower as assistant coach.

=== 2014–15 season ===
Canberra United booked their place in the W-league Finals series with the most unlikely of wins over Premiers Perth Glory in the final match of the regular season. United needed at least 1 point to make the finals but faced off against the hardest of opponents in the Glory who had run away with the Premiership title with ten wins from eleven matches heading into the final match at Viking Park, Canberra. Things did not seem like they were going to plan when United went behind in the 53rd minute but they came from behind with goals to Heyman & Sykes clinching third spot in the league and finals football.

Canberra United drew Melbourne Victory for the W-League semi-finals and headed down to Kardinia Park in Geelong to square off for the right to line up in the Final. American import, Chantel Jones, proved to be the influential winner as United progressed to the Grand Final thanks to her glovesmenship in a tightly fought penalty shootout after the match ended nill – nill. Chantel revealed after the match she chose to go left in the Victory's final penalty kick because their previous four penalties also went to the left hand side. This proved a treat as Jones saved the shot before guest signing, Kendall Fletcher, stepped up to slot the final shot into the net and book the girls from the Capital a ticket to the Grand Final.

United came up against familiar foe in the Grand Final as they faced the Premiers Perth Glory for the second time in three matches. the Glory were heavy favourites leading into the match after setting a string of records including most goals scored, most points accumulated, highest winning streak to start the season and getting the privilege to play at home for the final at Perth Oval. But it was United who would cause a boilover in the west to secure their second Championship in the club's history. United opened the scoring with a pulsating strike by Stephanie Ochs but the Glory pulled level through their own long range strike by Shelina Zadorsky. This set the stage for a tense finish to the match and the 2,671 fans were treated to some football drama as just when it looked like the Glory would go on with things and get a second, it was in fact the visitors who snatched a second goal through the ever reliable Ashleigh Sykes. A minute later Perth had won a penalty and up stepped Australia international Kate Gill to take the shot. Chantel Jones stood strong and pulled off a good save to keep United in the lead which was duly doubled a minute later as Sykes grabbed her Grand Final brace and secured the title for Canberra. Canberra did miss a penalty in stoppage time with Mackenzie Arnold saving Grace Gill's shot but it was already all over by that stage.

=== 2015–16 season ===
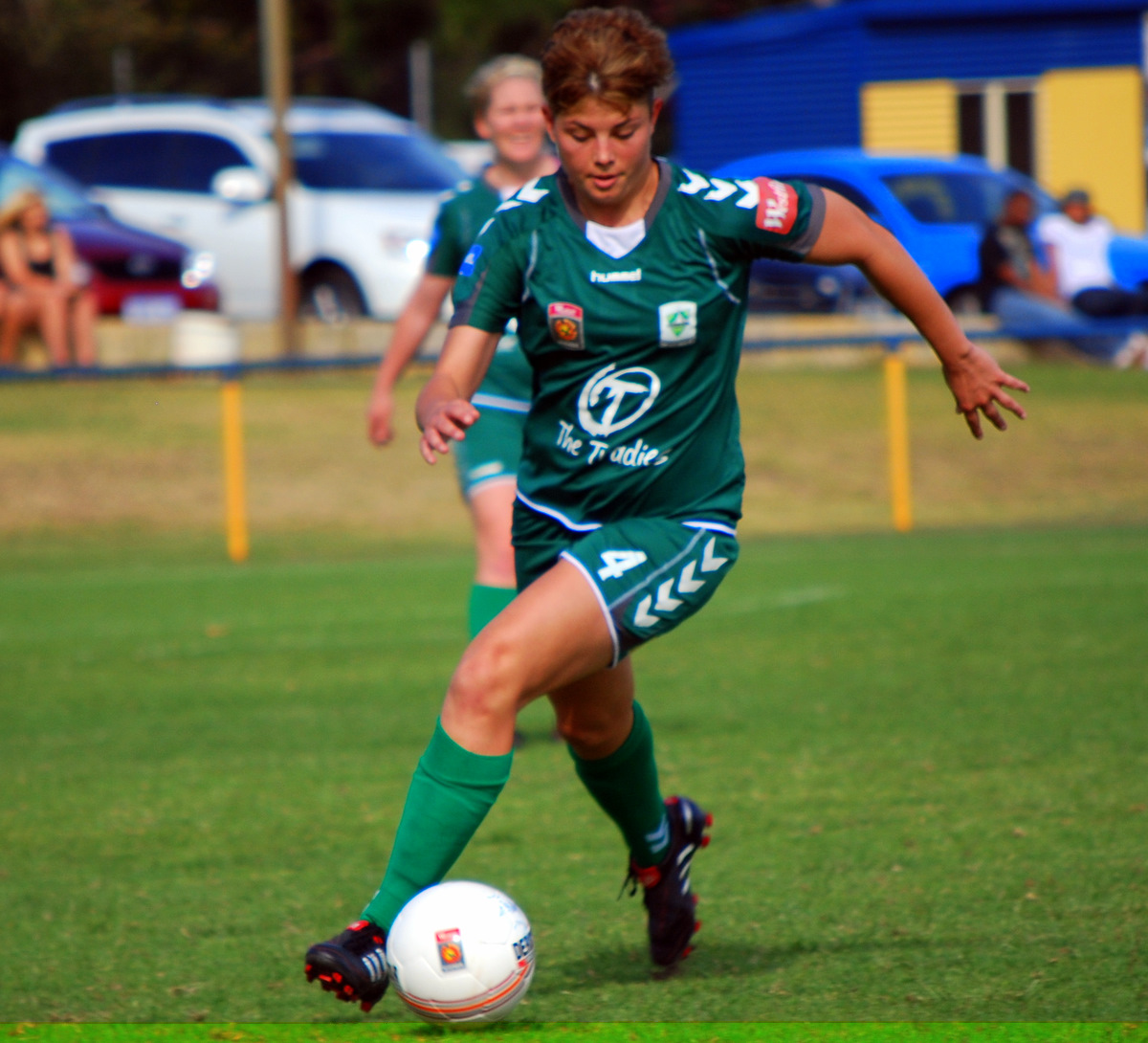
Michelle Heyman

Canberra United have signed five new players for the 2015–16 season, including Mexican international Veronica Perez, New Zealand forward Emma Kete, Emma Checker, Jenna McCormick and rookie Nickoletta Flannery. Veronica Perez is the first Mexican international to play in the W-League. Emma Kete also returned to the club. Canberra United's leading goalscorer of all time, Michelle Heyman also signed on for a 6th successive year with the club.

== Club identity ==
=== Colours and badge ===
The primary club colour of Canberra United is green, chosen principally since it did not clash with the other seven clubs in the inaugural competition. They are the second elite sporting team from the city to wear a green jersey after National Rugby League club, Canberra Raiders. This has led to some cross-promotion between the two 'green machine' teams. The Canberra United badge depicts the flagpole of Parliament House, a symbol of Canberra. The logo was refreshed in 2023 by local Canberra Design agency, Inklab.

=== Stadium ===
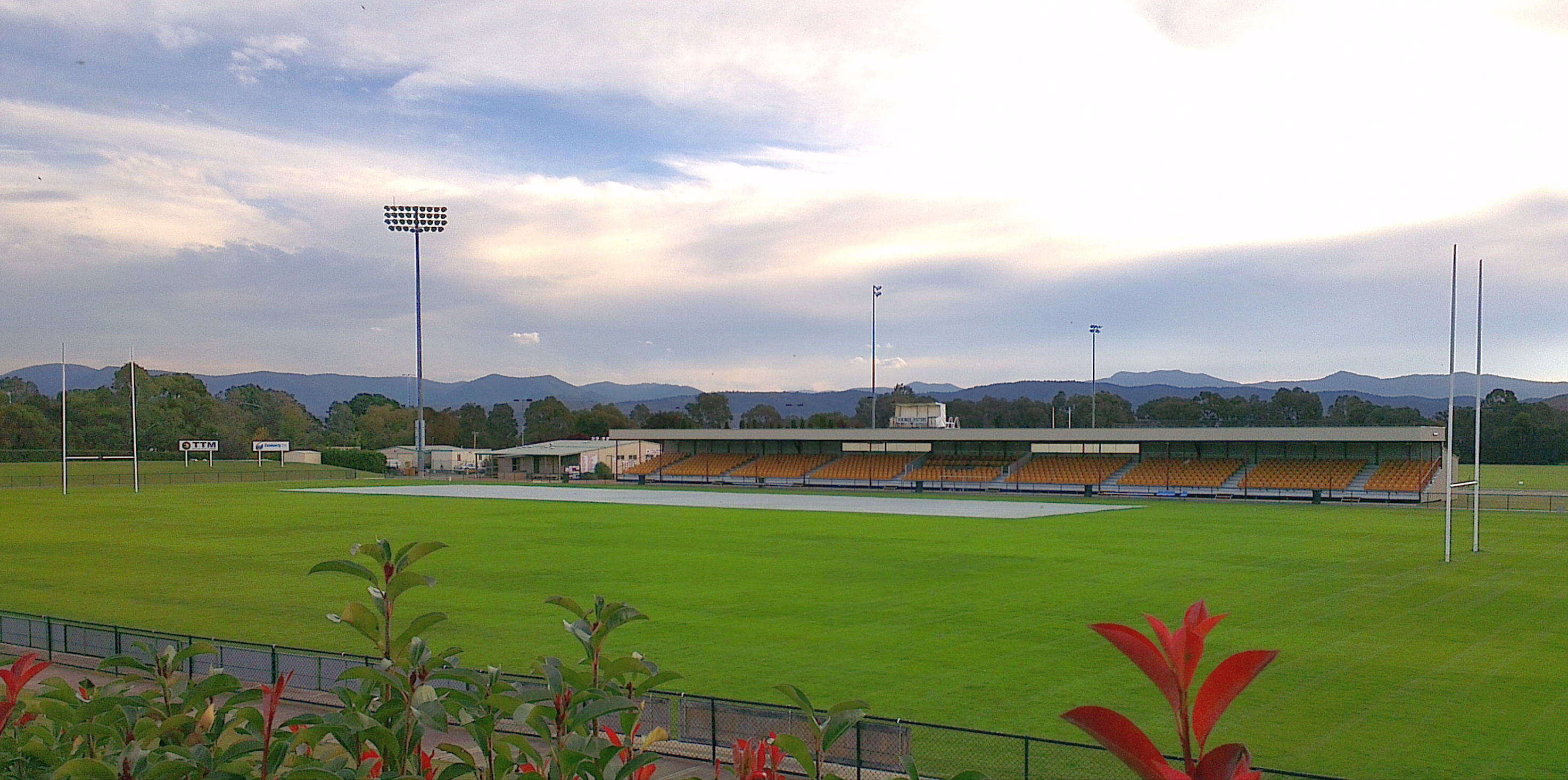
Viking Park, Wanniassa, Tuggeranong

Canberra's current home ground for ALW home matches is McKellar Park, a purpose built football ground within the Belconnen region in Canberra's north-west. In 2020–2021 their home ground was Viking Park, a multi-purpose stadium within the Tuggeranong region in Canberra's south. The stadium has a grand stand and hills surrounding a rectangular playing surface. The capacity for Viking Park is 7,000 with 1,000 seats in the grand stand. United moved into Viking Park at the beginning of the 2020/21 W-League season following the closure of McKellar Park by the owner due to COVID-19. Canberra United's maiden home ground was McKellar Park - the club played at McKellar for seven years with a handful of matches played at alternative grounds including: Deakin Stadium, AIS Enclosed, Viking Park and Canberra Stadium. The FFA partnered United with Central Coast Mariners in 2009 and 2016/17 to feature in 'double-header' W-League and A-League fixtures at Canberra Stadium.

Home stadium history
#	Name	From	To
1	McKellar Park	2013	2020
2	Viking Park	2020	2021
3	McKellar Park	2022	Present

=== Supporters ===
Canberra United had the highest attendance in the W-League in the inaugural season with an average crowd of 1,029. Their first home match attracted a crowd of 1,637 against Central Coast Mariners (9 November 2008).

The largest attendance to watch a Westfield W-League match at McKellar Park was 2,512 for the Grand Final against Brisbane Roar (28 January 2012).

The largest attendance to watch a Westfield W-League match at Canberra Stadium was 2,595 against Melbourne City (12 November 2016).

=== Ownership ===
The club was owned and operated since its inception in 2008 by Capital Football. Ahead of the 2025–26 season, Capital Football announced that it would be the last season running the club, forcing the Australian Professional Leagues (APL) to find new owners in time for the 2026–27 season.

On 17 July 2026, the APL announced that new ownership had been secured, with newly established Australian Sports Group taking over the club. They will also have an option of introducing an A-League Men team for the 2028–29 season.

=== Sponsors ===
Season	Kit manufacturer	Shirt sponsor	Secondary sponsors
2008	Hummel	CFMEU	Capital Tourism ActewAGL
2008–09	Hummel	CFMEU	Capital Tourism ActewAGL
2010	Hummel	The Tradies	Capital Tourism ActewAGL
2011	Hummel	Rock Development Group	Capital Tourism ActewAGL
2015–16	Nike	University of Canberra	CBR (ACT Government)
2016–17	Nike	University of Canberra	CBR (ACT Government)
2017–18	Nike	University of Canberra	CBR (ACT Government)
2018–19	Nike	University of Canberra	CBR (ACT Government)
2019–20	Viva	University of Canberra	CBR (ACT Government)
2020–21	Apelle	Club Lime (Home) University of Canberra (Away)	CBR (ACT Government)
2021–22	ISC Apparel	Club Lime (Home) University of Canberra (Away)	CBR (ACT Government)

== Personnel ==
=== Current squad ===
As of 23 October 2026

Note: Flags indicate national team as defined under FIFA eligibility rules; some limited exceptions apply. Players may hold more than one non-FIFA nationality.

No.	Pos.	Nation	Player
1	GK	AUS	Sally James
2	DF	AUT	Naïla Schoefberger
3	DF	NZL	Elizabeth Anton
4	DF	AUS	Tehya Aspland
5	MF	AUS	Sarah Morgan
6	FW	AUS	Lily McMahon
7	FW	AUS	Sienna Dale
8	DF	AUS	Sasha Grove
10	MF	AUS	Emily Condon
12	FW	AUS	Hayley Taylor-Young
13	FW	AUS	Sofia Christopherson
17	DF	AUS	Zoe Tolland

No.	Pos.	Nation	Player
18	GK	AUS	Coco Majstorovic
20	FW	AUS	Lillian Skelly
22	DF	PHI	Madison Ayson
23	FW	AUS	Michelle Heyman (captain)
24	FW	AUS	Caley Tallon-Henniker
25	MF	AUS	Darcey Malone
26	GK	AUS	Charlotte Hrehoresin
27	GK	AUS	Eliza Evans
32	MF	AUS	Bethany Gordon
33	MF	JPN	Nanako Sasaki
44	FW	NZL	Kelli Brown

=== Club officials ===
Current as of 1 November 2024

Position	Name
Chief Executive Officer	(Australia) Theo Fotopoulos
Head Coach	(Australia) Antoni Jagarinec
Assistant Coach	(Australia) Ahmed Ugool
Goalkeeper Coach	(Australia) Tim Davies
Physiotherapist	(Australia) Sarah Kelly
Team Doctor	(Australia) Dr. Tristyn Lowe
Media Manager	(England) Russ Gibbs

=== Head coaches ===
Current as of 19 April 2025

Canberra United head coaches
#	Head coach	Term		Record					Ref.
#	Head coach	From	To	M	W	D	L	Win %	Ref.
1	(Australia) Robbie Hooker	October 2008	January 2009	12	5	4	3	41.7%	
2	(Australia) Ray Junna	June 2009	February 2011	22	9	4	9	40.9%	
3	(Czech Republic) Jitka Klimková	August 2011	January 2013	23	14	5	4	60.9%	
4	(Netherlands) Liesbeth Migchelsen	August 2013	December 2014	27	17	2	8	63.0%	
5	(Australia) Rae Dower	March 2015	February 2017	26	15	4	7	57.7%	
6	(Australia) Heather Garriock	October 2017	February 2020	36	12	6	18	33.3%	
7	(Australia) Vicki Linton	December 2020	February 2022	13	6	4	3	46.2%	
8	(Australia) Njegosh Popovich	May 2022	May 2024	40	14	11	15	35.0%	
9	(Australia) Antoni Jagarinec	June 2024	present	23	9	6	8	39.1%	

== Honours ==
- A-League Women:
  - (gold) Champions (2): 2011–12, 2014
  - (silver) Runners-up (1): 2008–09
  - (gold) Premiers (3): 2011–12, 2013–14, 2016–17
  - (silver) Runners-up (1): 2015–16

== Records ==
Record	Scoreline	Opposition	Date	References
Biggest win	7–2	Perth Glory	17 January 2017	
Biggest loss	0–6	Sydney FC	15 January 2022	

== Academy and Youth ==
The Canberra United Academy was set up in 2016 to represent the Capital Football High Performance Program, aligned with the FFA national technical strategy, catering for players from the ACT and the surrounding region. Originally the Academy ran programs for both girls and boys from U-10 to first grade. The boys program was met with opposition by the established ACT NPL clubs, who believed the Academy would take their best young players. The Clubs lobbied and threatened to break-away and establish a new league if the Academy was not removed from the first grade Capital Football NPL league. In 2017, after just one season, the boys program was amalgamated with the FFA Centre of Excellence program. Following the 2023 NPL season, the Canberra United Academy transitioned into a Talented Sports Program, meaning the Canberra United Academy Women's NPL team was disbanded.

== Season-by-season results ==
Champions	Runners-up	Third Place

Canberra United Season-by-Season W-League Results
Season	Regular season									Finals							Top scorer		Leadership	
Season	M	W	D	L	GF	GA	GD	PTS	League	M	W	L	GF	GA	GD	Finals	Name	Goals	Captain	Co-Captain
2008–09	10	4	4	2	14	10	+4	16	3rd	2	1	1	1	2	-1	Runner-up	(Australia) Caitlin Munoz	4	(Australia) Ellie Brush	–
2009	10	4	2	4	17	12	+5	14	4th	1	0	1	0	3	-3	Semi-final	(Taiwan) Tseng Shu-o	4	(Australia) Ellie Brush	(Australia) Lydia Williams
2010–11	10	5	2	3	16	9	+7	17	3rd	1	0	1	2	2	+0	Semi-final	(Australia) Michelle Heyman	8	(Australia) Ellie Brush	(Australia) Lydia Williams
2011–12	10	7	3	0	23	9	+14	24	1st	2	2	0	4	2	+2	Champions	(Australia) Michelle Heyman	15	(Australia) Ellie Brush	(Australia) Lydia Williams
2012–13	12	5	3	4	25	20	+5	18	5th	–							(Australia) Caitlin Munoz	4	(Australia) Ellie Brush	(Australia) Lydia Williams
2013–14	12	9	0	3	28	8	+20	27	1st	1	0	1	1	2	-1	Semi-final	(Australia) Michelle Heyman	7	(Australia) Nicole Sykes	–
2014	12	6	2	4	22	18	+4	20	3rd	2	2	0	3	1	+2	Champions	(Australia) Michelle Heyman	6	(Australia) Nicole Sykes	–
2015–16	12	8	2	2	26	8	+18	26	2nd	1	0	1	0	1	-1	Semi-final	(Australia) Ashleigh Sykes	7	(Australia) Nicole Sykes	–
2016–17	12	7	2	3	33	21	+12	23	1st	1	0	1	0	1	-1	Semi-final	(Australia) Ashleigh Sykes	12	(Australia) Ellie Brush	(Australia) Michelle Heyman
2017–18	12	5	1	6	24	27	-3	16	5th	–							(Norway) Elise Thorsnes	6	(Australia) Michelle Heyman	(Australia) Ashleigh Sykes
2018–19	12	3	4	5	13	18	-5	13	8th	–							(South Africa) Rhoda Mulaudzi	4	(Scotland) Rachel Corsie	–
2019–20	12	4	1	7	13	29	-16	13	6th	–							(United States) Simone Charley	5	(Australia) Nikola Orgill	(Australia) Karly Roestbakken
2020–21	12	6	4	2	21	16	+5	22	4th	1	0	1	0	3	-3	Semi-final	(Australia) Michelle Heyman	10	(United States) Kendall Fletcher	–
2021–22	14	2	7	5	24	29	-5	13	7th	–							(Australia) Michelle Heyman	9	(Australia) Michelle Heyman	
2022-23	18	8	5	5	35	30	5	29	5th	–							(Australia) Michelle Heyman	12	(Australia) Michelle Heyman	
2023-24	22	6	6	10	39	47	-8	24	11th	–							(Australia) Michelle Heyman	17	(Australia) Michelle Heyman	

Chart of yearly table positions for Canberra United in A-League Women

== See also ==
- List of top-division football clubs in AFC countries
- Women's soccer in Australia
- A-League Women records and statistics
- Australia women's national soccer team
