= Brisbane Roar FC (women) =

Coordinates: 27°26′31″S 153°1′4″E

Brisbane Roar Women
- Full name: Brisbane Roar Women Football Club
- Founded: 2008; 18 years ago
- Ground: Spencer Park
- Capacity: 5,000
- Chairman: Kaz Patafta
- Manager: Johnathan Clemente
- League: A-League Women
- 2025–26: 4th of 11
- Website: www.brisbaneroar.com.au
Home colours	Away colours

Brisbane Roar Women Football Club, formerly known Queensland Roar Women, is an Australian professional women's soccer club based in Brisbane, Queensland (founded in 2008). The Roar competes in the country's premier women's soccer competition, the A-League Women.

== History ==
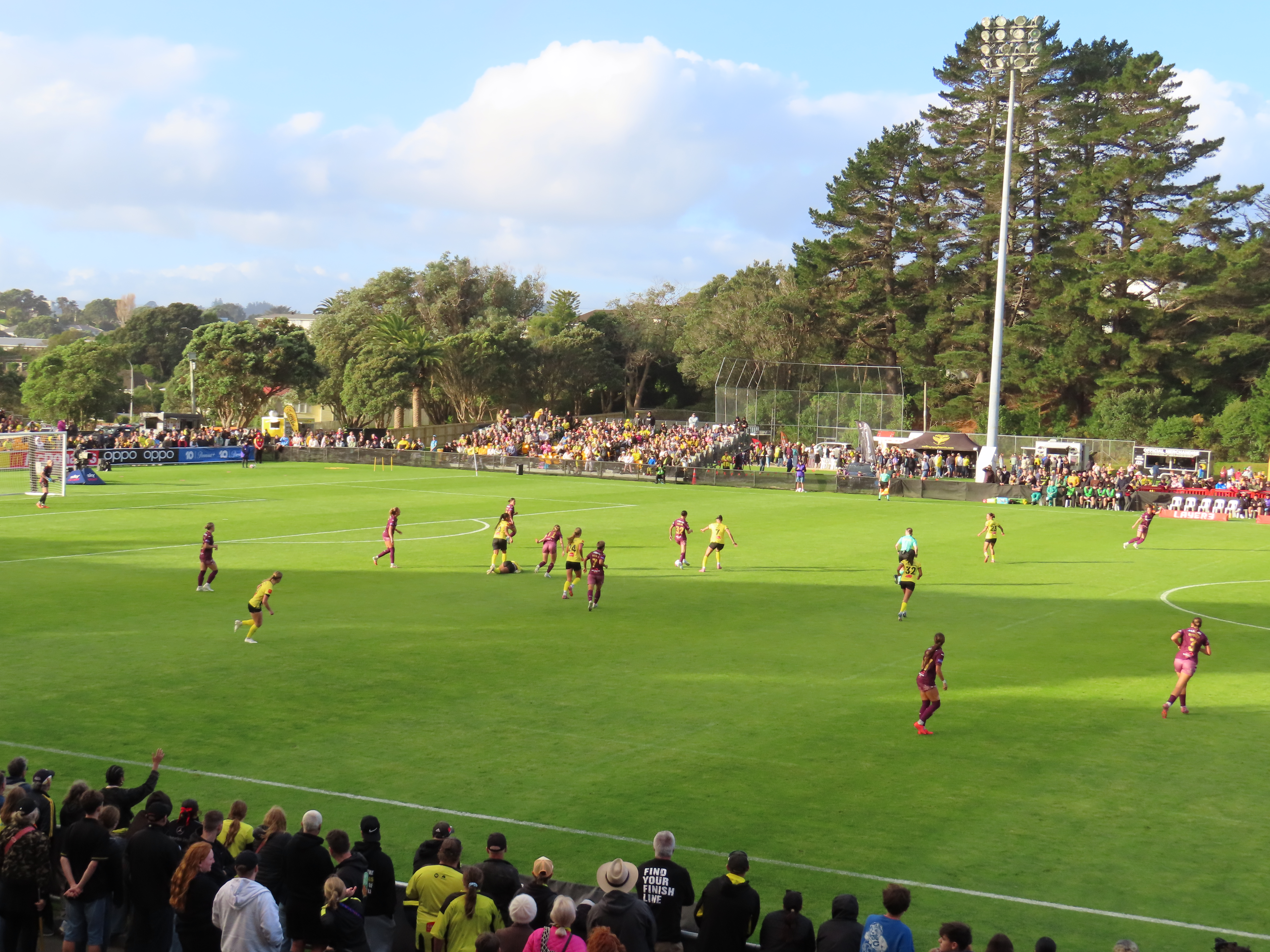
Semifinal match between the Roar and Wellington Phoenix FC during the 2026 A-League Women semifinals.

=== Early years ===
Brisbane Roar (then Queensland Roar) were a founding member of the W-League in 2008. The team was initially coached by Welshman Jeff Hopkins, who had played his football career predominantly in England, as well as representing Wales at the international level. The playing roster featured a mix of youth and veterans, including founding captain and Matildas stalwart, Kate McShea, and up-and-coming goalkeeper Casey Dumont.

== Home ground ==
From 2025–26 season onwards, Brisbane Roar will play at Spencer Park in Newmarket, having previously played at Perry Park. Previous home grounds have included the Queensland Sport and Athletics Centre, Suncorp Stadium, A.J. Kelly Park, Kayo Stadium, Lions Stadium, Stockland Park and Cleveland Showgrounds.

== Players ==
=== First-team squad ===
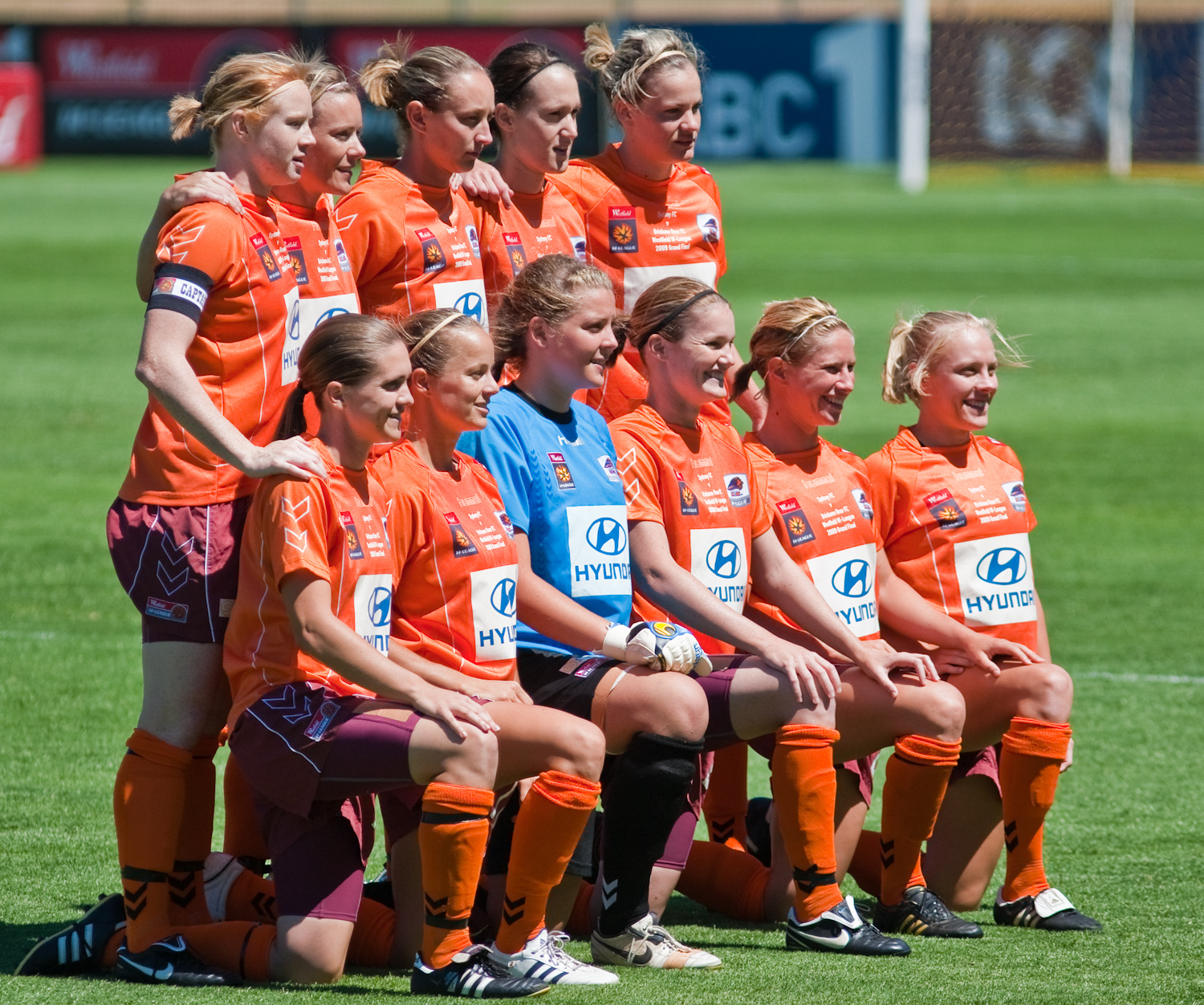
Brisbane Roar Women in 2009

As of 16 September 2026

Note: Flags indicate national team as defined under FIFA eligibility rules; some limited exceptions apply. Players may hold more than one non-FIFA nationality.

No.	Pos.	Nation	Player
1	GK	AUS	Chloe Lincoln
2	DF	AUS	Annabel Martin
3	FW	AUS	Daisy Brown (scholarship)
4	FW	AUS	Kijah Stephenson
5	DF	AUS	Isabel Hodgson
6	DF	AUS	Ruby Cuthbert
7	FW	USA	Murphy Agnew
8	DF	USA	Josie Studer
10	FW	AUS	Grace Kuilamu
11	FW	AUS	Sharn Freier
12	GK	AUS	Tahlia Franco

No.	Pos.	Nation	Player
14	MF	AUS	Zara Kruger
15	DF	PHI	Hali Long
16	FW	USA	Abby Smothers
17	FW	AUS	Maja Markovski
18	DF	AUS	Amali Kinsella (scholarship)
19	MF	AUS	Lily Punch
21	MF	PHI	Katrina Guillou
22	DF	AUS	Natalie Tathem (captain)
23	DF	AUS	Isabela Hoyos (scholarship)
24	MF	AUS	Emily Roach
27	MF	AUS	Rosie Curtis

=== Reserves ===
Brisbane Roar also operates four reserve teams, which is mainly formed from Youth players.

=== Former players ===
For notable current and former players, see Category:Brisbane Roar FC (women) players

=== Retired numbers ===
- 13 – (Australia) Tameka Yallop (forward, 2008–18, 2019–21, 2023–26)

== Coaching history ==
As of 6 August 2026

Position	Name
Head coach	(Australia) Johnathan Clemente

=== Coach history ===
Name	Nationality	From	To
Jeff Hopkins	Wales	1 July 2008	30 June 2012
Belinda Wilson	Australia	6 September 2012	6 September 2016
Melissa Andreatta	Australia	20 September 2016	30 June 2019
Jake Goodship	Australia	1 July 2019	10 July 2021
Garrath McPherson	Australia	17 August 2021	13 November 2023
Alex Smith	United States	14 November 2023	7 July 2026
Johnathan Clemente	Australia	5 August 2026	

== Honours ==
Chart of yearly table positions for Brisbane Roar in A-League Women

- Premiers (3): 2008–09, 2012–13, 2017–18
  - Runners-Up (4): 2010–11, 2011–12, 2018–19, 2020–21
- Champions (2): 2008–09, 2010–11
  - Runners-Up (3): 2009, 2011–12, 2013–14
- Fair Play Award Winners (3): 2008–09, 2013-14, 2020-21

== Records ==
As of 9 May 2026

Biggest Victory:

- 8-2 vs Western United, 29 December 2024
- 6–0 vs Perth Glory, 31 October 2009
- 6–0 vs Newcastle Jets, 5 December 2009
- 6–0 vs Melbourne Victory, 22 January 2021
- 6-1 vs Newcastle Jets, 21 December 2024

Biggest Defeat:

- 8–2 vs Adelaide United, 13 February 2022

Highest Scoring Game:

- 8–2 Loss vs Adelaide United, 13 February 2022
- 8-2 Win vs Western United, 29 December 2024

Longest Undefeated Streak:

- 18 Matches, 25 October 2008 – 22 November 2009

== See also ==
- List of top-division football clubs in AFC countries
- Women's soccer in Australia
- W-League (Australia) all-time records
- Australia women's national soccer team
- A-League Women awards
- Brisbane Roar
