= 2009 Adelaide United FC (women) season =

Adelaide United (W-League)
2009 season
- Chairman: Mel Patzwald
- Head Coach: Michael Barnett
- W-League: 7th
- W-League Finals: DNQ
- Top goalscorer: Racheal Quigley (5)
- Biggest defeat: 0–6 vs. Sydney FC (A) (1 November 2009); W-League; 0–6 vs. Central Coast Mariners (H) (14 November 2009); W-League
Home colours	Away colours

The 2009 season was Adelaide United Football Club (W-League)'s second season, in the W-League. Adelaide United finished 7th in their W-League season.

== Review ==
=== September ===
This season saw drastic squad changes after a disappointing inaugural season, including new signing Christina Papageorgiou taking the captaincy. However, Adelaide still struggled in the league failing to win a single game, and finished seventh ahead of the Newcastle Jets.

=== March ===
Racheal Quigley was named Adelaide United 2009/10 Westfield W-League Most Valuable Player.

== Players ==
Note: Flags indicate national team as defined under FIFA eligibility rules; some limited exceptions apply. Players may hold more than one non-FIFA nationality.

No.	Pos.	Nation	Player
1	GK	AUS	Sian McLaren
2	DF	AUS	Ebony Weidenbach
3	DF	AUS	Renee Harrison
4	DF	AUS	Ruth Blackburn
5	DF	AUS	Ashlee Faul
6	DF	AUS	Thomai Kezios
7	FW	AUS	Racheal Quigley
8	MF	AUS	Ruth Wallace
9	MF	AUS	Angela Fimmano
10	FW	AUS	Marijana Rajcic

No.	Pos.	Nation	Player
11	MF	AUS	Georgia Chapman
12	FW	AUS	Katerina Bexis
13	MF	AUS	Lauren Chilvers
14	FW	AUS	Donna Cockayne
15	MF	AUS	Tenneille Boaler
16	MF	AUS	Christina Papageorgiou (Captain)
17	MF	AUS	Karina Roweth
18	MF	AUS	Rochelle Kuhar
19	DF	AUS	Nenita Burgess
20	GK	AUS	Kristi Harvey

== Transfers ==
In

Name	Position	Moving from
(Australia) Thomai Kezios	Defender	(Australia) Adelaide Olympic
(Australia) Ebony Weidenbach	Defender	(Australia) SASI
(Australia) Ashlee Faul	Defender	(Australia) SASI
(Australia) Ruth Blackburn	Defender	(Australia) Brisbane Roar
(Australia) Ruth Wallace	Midfielder	(Australia) SASI
(Australia) Georgia Chapman	Midfielder	(Australia) Redlands United
(Australia) Tenneille Boaler	Midfielder	(Australia) Redlands United
(Australia) Rochelle Kuhar	Midfielder	(Australia) Metro United
(Australia) Christina Papageorgiou	Midfielder	(Australia) Adelaide City
(Australia) Marijana Rajcic	Striker	(Australia) Fulham United
(Australia) Katerina Bexis	Striker	(Australia) Adelaide Olympic
(Australia) Nenita Burgess	Defender	(Australia) Fulham United

Out

Name	Position	Moving to
(Australia) Emma Wirkus	Goalkeeper	Perth Glory;
(Australia) Dianne Alagich	Defender	–
(Australia) Sarah Amorim	Defender	–
(Australia) Kristyn Swaffer	Defender	–
(Australia) Sharon Black	Midfielder	–
(Australia) Tanya Harrison	Midfielder	–
(Australia) April Mann	Midfielder	–
(Australia) Leah Robinson	Midfielder	–
(Australia) Victoria Balomenos	Striker	–
(Australia) Stephanie Tokich	Striker	–
(Australia) Sandra Scalzi	Striker	–

== Competitions ==
=== Overall record ===
Competition	First match	Last match	Starting round	Final position	Record							
Competition	First match	Last match	Starting round	Final position	Pld	W	D	L	GF	GA	GD	Win %
W-League	25 October 2008	27 December 2008	Matchday 1	8th	10	2	1	7	13	28	−15	20.00
Total					10	2	1	7	13	28	−15	20.00

Source: Competitions

=== W-League ===
==== League table ====
Pos	Team	Pld	W	D	L	GF	GA	GD	Pts	Qualification
1	Sydney FC (C)	10	7	2	1	25	10	+15	23	Qualification to Finals series
2	Central Coast Mariners	10	7	1	2	24	7	+17	22	Qualification to Finals series
3	Brisbane Roar	10	6	3	1	24	7	+17	21	Qualification to Finals series
4	Canberra United	10	4	2	4	17	12	+5	14	Qualification to Finals series
5	Melbourne Victory	10	4	2	4	9	10	−1	14	
6	Perth Glory	10	4	1	5	11	22	−11	13	
7	Adelaide United	10	0	3	7	7	31	−24	3	
8	Newcastle Jets	10	0	2	8	7	25	−18	2	

Source: au.soccerway.com
Rules for classification: 1) points; 2) goal difference; 3) number of goals scored.
(C) Champions

==== Results summary ====
Overall								Home						Away					
Pld	W	D	L	GF	GA	GD	Pts	W	D	L	GF	GA	GD	W	D	L	GF	GA	GD
10	0	3	7	7	31	−24	3	0	1	4	2	15	−13	0	2	3	5	16	−11

Source: worldfootball.net

==== Results by round ====
Round	1	2	3	4	5	6	7	8	9	10
Ground	H	A	H	H	A	A	H	A	H	A
Result	D	L	L	L	L	D	L	D	L	L
Position	4	7	8	7	8	8	8	7	7	7
Points	1	1	1	1	1	2	2	3	3	3

Source: worldfootball.net
A = Away; H = Home; W = Win; D = Draw; L = Loss

==== Matches ====
5 October 2009 1	Adelaide United	0–0	Newcastle Jets	Adelaide
14:45 ACDT		Report		Stadium: Hindmarsh Stadium; Referee: Lee Corey

11 October 2009 2	Central Coast Mariners	2–0	Adelaide United	Gosford
12:15 AEDT	Camilleri 73'; Connor 87'	Report		Stadium: Bluetongue Stadium; Referee: Kate Jacewicz

17 October 2009 3	Adelaide United	0–2	Melbourne Victory	Adelaide
14:30 ACDT		Report	Gorry 29'; Kurulay 81'	Stadium: Hindmarsh Stadium; Referee: Lee Corey

24 October 2009 4	Adelaide United	0–1	Perth Glory	Adelaide
14:30 ACDT		Report	Singer 47'	Stadium: Hindmarsh Stadium; Referee: Jacqui Melksham

1 November 2009 5	Sydney FC	6–0	Adelaide United	Sydney
14:15 AEDT	Clifford 5'; Walsh 22', 29'; Khamis 59'; Carney 73'; Cannulli 83'	Report		Stadium: Sydney Football Stadium; Referee: Kirralee Gardener

7 November 2009 6	Newcastle Jets	3–3	Adelaide United	Newcastle
16:00 AEDT	Smith 19'; Crawford 60'; Cartwright 79'	Report	Boaler 25'; Quigley 45', 57' (pen.)	Stadium: Wanderers Oval; Referee: Kate Jacewicz

14 November 2009 7	Adelaide United	0–6	Central Coast Mariners	Adelaide
14:30 ACDT		Report	Heyman 22', 40', 59'; Connor 45'; Fletcher 51'; Vandenbergh 73'	Stadium: Hindmarsh Stadium; Referee: Lee Corey

22 November 2009 8	Brisbane Roar	2–2	Adelaide United	Brisbane
18:00 AEST	Butt 42'; Kellond-Knight 53'	Report	Quigley 10'; Wallace 20'	Stadium: Ballymore Stadium; Referee: Rebecca Durcau

28 November 2009 9	Adelaide United	2–6	Sydney FC	Adelaide
15:30 ACDT	Quigley 82', 90+2'	Report	Walsh 8'; Garriock 10', 74'; Khamis 26'; Whitfield 90+1'; Simon 90+3'	Stadium: Hindmarsh Stadium; Referee: Lee Corey

5 December 2009 10	Canberra United	3–0	Adelaide United	Canberra
17:00 AEDT	Brush 45+1'; van Egmond 86'; Perry 90'	Report		Stadium: Deakin Football Stadium; Attendance: 785; Referee: Peta McCallum

== Statistics ==
=== Appearances and goals ===
No.	Pos.	Name	W-League		Total		Discipline	
No.	Pos.	Name	Apps	Goals	Apps	Goals	Yellow card	Red card
1	GK	(Australia) Sian McLaren	10	0	10	0	0	0
2	DF	(Australia) Ebony Weidenbach	6	0	6	0	1	0
3	DF	(Australia) Renee Harrison	9	0	9	0	3	0
4	DF	(Australia) Ruth Blackburn	0	0	0	0	0	0
5	DF	(Australia) Ashlee Faul	2	0	2	0	1	0
6	DF	(Australia) Thomai Kezios	5	0	5	0	0	0
7	FW	(Australia) Racheal Quigley	10	5	10	5	0	0
8	MF	(Australia) Ruth Wallace	3	1	3	1	0	0
9	MF	(Australia) Angela Fimmano	8	0	8	0	0	0
10	FW	(Australia) Marijana Rajcic	5	0	5	0	0	0
11	MF	(Australia) Georgia Chapman	10	0	10	0	1	0
12	FW	(Australia) Katerina Bexis	8	0	8	0	0	0
13	MF	(Australia) Lauren Chilvers	7	0	7	0	0	0
14	FW	(Australia) Donna Cockayne	9	0	9	0	3	0
15	MF	(Australia) Tenneille Boaler	10	1	10	1	1	0
16	MF	(Australia) Christina Papageorgiou	8	0	8	0	0	0
17	MF	(Australia) Karina Roweth	8	0	8	0	2	0
18	MF	(Australia) Rochelle Kuhar	9	0	9	0	0	0
19	DF	(Australia) Nenita Burgess	6	0	6	0	0	0
20	GK	(Australia) Kristi Harvey	1	0	1	0	0	0
21	MF	(Australia) Greta French-Kennedy^{1}	1	0	1	0	0	0

^{1}Short-term injury cover
