= List of Adelaide United FC (women) players =

Adelaide United Football Club (women), a women's association football club based in Hindmarsh, Adelaide, was founded in 2008 within the formation of the W-League (now A-League Women). The club's first team has competed in the A-League Women and all players who have played in at least one match are listed below.

Emily Condon holds the record for the greatest number of appearances for Adelaide United (women). Between 2014 and 2024, she has currently played 117 times for the club. The club's goalscoring record is held by Chelsie Dawber, who has currently scored 28 goals.

== Key ==
- The list is ordered first by date of debut, and then if necessary in alphabetical order.
- Appearances as a substitute are included.
- Statistics are correct up to and including the match played on 31 January 2025. Where a player left the club permanently after this date, her statistics are updated to her date of leaving.

Positions key
GK	Goalkeeper
DF	Defender
MF	Midfielder
FW	Forward

Nationality
Unless otherwise noted, the nationality of a player is determined by the country/countries which he has played for, or if said person has not played international football, their country of birth.
Position
Playing positions are listed according to the tactical formations that were employed at the time.
Club career
Club career is defined as the first and last calendar years in which the player appeared for the club in any of the competitions listed below.
Total appearances and Total goals
Total appearances and goals comprise those in the A-League Women regular season and finals series.

== Players ==
Players highlighted in bold are still actively playing at Adelaide United (women).

List of Adelaide United FC (women) players
Player	Nationality	Pos	Club career	Starts	Subs	Total	Goals	Ref.
Player	Nationality	Pos	Club career	Appearances			Goals	Ref.
Dianne Alagich	Australia	DF	2008	10	0	10	0	
Sarah Amorim	Australia	DF	2008	9	0	9	0	
Victoria Balomenos	Australia	FW	2008–2011	16	2	18	3	
Sharon Black	Australia	MF	2008	8	1	9	3	
Lauren Chilvers	England	MF	2008–2009	7	8	15	0	
Angela Fimmano	Australia	MF	2008–2011	10	14	24	0	
Renee Harrison	Australia	DF	2008–2010	17	2	19	0	
Tanya Harrison	Australia	MF	2008	4	5	9	0	
Kristi Harvey	Australia	GK	2008–2013	25	2	27	0	
Sian McLaren	Scotland	GK	2008–2012; 2020–2021	33	1	34	0	
Rachael Quigley	Australia	FW	2008–2014; 2016–2017	52	14	66	18	
Sandra Scalzi	Australia	FW	2008	7	1	8	4	
Kristyn Swaffer	Australia	DF	2008	10	0	10	1	
Stephanie Tokich	Australia	FW	2008; 2013	8	3	11	0	
Donna Cockayne	Australia	MF	2008–2012	31	3	36	1	
April Mann	Australia	MF	2008	7	1	8	0	
Leah Robinson	Canada	MF	2008	5	0	5	0	
Emma Wirkus	Australia	GK	2008	4	0	4	0	
Leanne Slater	Australia	DF	2008; 2011–2012	11	2	13	0	
Katerina Bexis	Australia	FW	2009	4	4	8	0	
Tenneille Boaler	Australia	MF	2009	8	2	10	1	
Georgia Chapman	Australia	MF	2009	10	0	10	0	
Thomai Kezios	Australia	DF	2009	1	5	6	0	
Rochelle Kuhar	Australia	MF	2009	9	0	9	0	
Christina Papagerogiou	Denmark	MF	2009–2011	13	2	15	0	
Marijana Rajcic	Australia	FW	2009–2012; 2012–2013; 2015–2016	20	13	33	3	
Karina Roweth	Australia	MF	2009	9	0	9	0	
Ebony Weidenbach	Australia	DF	2009	6	0	6	0	
Nenita Burgess	United States	DF	2009–2012	7	9	16	0	
Greta French-Kennedy	Australia	MF	2009–2012	0	5	5	0	
Ashlee Faul	Australia	DF	2009	3	0	3	0	
Ruth Wallace	Australia	MF	2009–2013	25	4	29	2	
Ruth Blackburn	Australia	DF	2010–2011	7	1	8	0	
Stacey Day	England	DF	2010–2011	8	2	10	0	
Katrina Gorry	Australia	MF	2010–2011	9	0	9	1	
Ashleigh Gunning	United States	FW	2010–2012	17	1	18	1	
Selin Kuralay	Australia	MF	2010–2011	7	2	9	1	
Loren Mahoney	Australia	DF	2010–2011	6	2	8	0	
Vedrana Popovic	Australia	DF	2010–2011	9	1	10	0	
Georgia Macri	Australia	MF	2010–2013	11	13	24	0	
Katherine Ebbs	Australia	MF	2010–2012	8	3	11	1	
Emma Checker	Australia	DF	2011–2013; 2017–2019	42	0	42	0	
Abby Erceg	New Zealand	DF	2011–2013	22	0	22	0	
Anna Green	New Zealand	DF	2011–2013	10	0	10	0	
Grace Henry	Australia	DF	2011–2012	8	3	11	0	
Vanessa Reed	Australia	FW	2011–2012	0	3	3	0	
Daniela Di Bartolo	Australia	MF	2011–2014	2	8	10	1	
Ebony Philcox	Australia	MF	2011–2012	2	2	4	0	
Laura Johns	Australia	DF	2012–2013; 2017–2021	29	10	39	0	
Ann Mayo	Australia	MF	2012–2013	12	0	12	1	
Sarah McLaughlin	New Zealand	FW	2012–2013	10	0	10	4	
Holly Patterson	New Zealand	FW	2012	8	0	8	0	
Cassandra Tsoumbris	Australia	DF	2012–2013	8	0	8	0	
Jessica Waterhouse	Australia	MF	2012–2014	11	3	14	0	
Alex Natoli	Australia	DF	2012–2013	8	2	10	0	
Lorena Maggio	Australia	MF	2012; 2015–2016	7	9	16	0	
Elise Whorlow	Australia	DF	2012–2013	1	3	4	0	
Jessie Wharepouri	Australia	DF	2012–2014	12	5	17	0	
Jenna McCormick	Australia	DF	2012–2014; 2017–2018; 2022–2023	50	3	53	1	
Kristy Moore	England	FW	2012–2014	27	0	27	8	
Melissa Barbieri	Australia	GK	2013–2014	24	0	24	0	
Jayah Brown	Australia	MF	2013–2014	6	3	9	0	
Bianca Gray	Australia	MF	2013	2	0	2	0	
Alexandra Gummer	Australia	DF	2013–2016	17	1	18	3	
**Isabel Hodgson**	Australia	FW	2013–	78	18	96	7	
Tiarn Powell	Australia	FW	2013–2016	27	7	34	7	
Tegan Riding	Australia	MF	2013–2014	0	5	5	0	
Laura Stockdale	England	MF	2013–2014	10	2	12	0	
Dalia Tais-Borg	Australia	DF	2013–2014	21	2	23	0	
Lisa-Marie Woods	Norway	MF	2013–2014	22	0	22	3	
Monique Iannella	Australia	MF	2013–2014	13	2	15	0	
Snez Veljanovska	Australia	DF	2013–2014	9	0	9	0	
**Emily Condon**	Australia	MF	2014–	84	33	117	21	
Louise Mason	Scotland	FW	2014	3	0	3	0	
Jessica Nagel	Australia	MF	2014	0	3	3	0	
Rachel Alonso	Australia	FW	2014	5	2	7	0	
Georgia Campagnale	Australia	DF	2014–2021	50	22	72	1	
**Dylan Holmes**	Australia	MF	2014–	84	7	91	8	
Katrine Pederson	Denmark	DF	2014	12	0	12	0	
Lauren Steer	Australia	DF	2014–2016	15	3	18	0	
Alex Chidiac	Australia	MF	2014; 2016–2018	10	18	28	4	
Danielle Brogan	Australia	DF	2014	7	0	7	0	
Gabrielle Bentley	Australia	MF	2014–2016	0	3	3	0	
Elysha Magor	Australia	DF	2014	0	1	1	0	
Abigail Dahlkemper	United States	DF	2015–2016	12	0	12	5	
Sarah Killion	United States	MF	2015–2016	12	0	12	1	
Elizabeth Milne	New Zealand	DF	2015–2016	12	0	12	0	
Chantelle Ryder	Australia	FW	2015–2016	8	2	10	0	
Kaitlyn Savage	United States	GK	2015–2016	12	0	12	0	
Rosie Sutton	Australia	FW	2015–2016	12	0	12	5	
Allira Toby	Australia	FW	2015–2016	5	7	12	1	
Grace Abbey	Australia	DF	2015–2018	12	5	17	0	
**Matilda McNamara**	Australia	DF	2015–2022; 2024–	44	2	46	3	
Danielle Colaprico	United States	MF	2016–2018	23	0	23	0	
**Emily Hodgson**	Australia	DF	2016–	99	17	116	2	
Sofia Huerta	United States	MF	2016–2017	12	0	12	8	
Dragana Kljajic	Australia	FW	2016	2	3	5	0	
Ally Ladas	Australia	MF	2016–2017	2	7	9	1	
Sarah Langman	Australia	FW	2016–2018	17	3	20	9	
Mônica	Brazil	FW	2016–2017	9	0	9	1	
Katie Naughton	United States	DF	2016–2018	24	0	24	2	
Stella Rigon	Australia	FW	2016–2017	9	0	9	1	
Isabella Scalzi	Australia	MF	2016–2017	4	3	7	0	
Sarah Willacy	Australia	GK	2016–2020	38	0	38	0	
Kelsey Zafiridis	Australia	FW	2016–2017	0	4	4	0	
Eliza Campbell	Australia	GK	2016–2017	10	0	10	0	
Georgia Iannella	Australia	DF	2016–2018	1	4	5	0	
Lucy Adamopoulos	Australia	DF	2017	0	2	2	0	
Cheyenne Hammond	Australia	DF	2017	0	1	1	0	
**Chelsie Dawber**	Australia	MF	2017–	64	13	77	28	
Makenzy Doniak	United States	FW	2017–2018	12	0	12	7	
Alyssa Mautz	United States	MF	2017–2018	12	0	12	2	
Katelyn Tucker	Australia	MF	2017	0	2	2	0	
Nora Peat	Australia	MF	2017–2018	1	4	5	0	
Amber Brooks	United States	MF	2018–2020	23	0	23	1	
Fanndís Friðriksdóttir	Iceland	FW	2018–2019	8	2	10	2	
Charlotte Grant	Australia	DF	2018–2021	22	12	34	0	
Michelle Heyman	Australia	FW	2018–2019	12	0	12	1	
Gunnhildur Jónsdóttir	Iceland	MF	2018–2019	11	0	11	1	
Veronica Latsko	United States	FW	2018–2019	12	0	12	9	
**Meleri Mullan**	Australia	FW	2018; 2020–2022; 2024–	5	30	35	0	
Lara Kirkby	Australia	MF	2018–2021	0	13	13	0	
Laís Araújo	Brazil	MF	2019–2020	9	2	11	0	
Julia Ashley	United States	DF	2019–2020	8	0	8	0	
Ciara Fowler	Australia	MF	2019–2020	0	8	8	0	
Mary Fowler	Australia	FW	2019–2020	7	1	8	3	
Mallory Weber	United States	FW	2019–2021	21	0	21	0	
Victoria Mansueto	Australia	FW	2020	0	2	2	0	
**Ella Tonkin**	Australia	FW	2020–	44	7	51	1	
María José Rojas	Chile	FW	2020–2021	12	0	12	1	
Fiona Worts	Australia	FW	2020–2023	45	5	50	25	
Maruschka Waldus	Netherlands	DF	2021–2024	48	1	49	3	
**Annalee Grove**	Australia	GK	2021–	53	0	53	0	
Shadeene Evans	Australia	FW	2021–2022	4	3	7	0	
Paige Hayward	Australia	FW	2021–2023	23	3	26	0	
Reona Omiya	Japan	MF	2021–2022	6	9	15	0	
**Nanako Sasaki**	Japan	MF	2021–	51	5	56	4	
Emma Stanbury	Australia	FW	2021–2022	4	8	12	0	
Grace Taranto	Australia	DF	2021–2022	0	2	2	0	
Leia Varley	Australia	FW	2021–2022	0	5	5	0	
Georgia Beaumont	Australia	FW	2021–2022	1	7	8	0	
Natasha Brough	Australia	MF	2021	0	1	1	0	
Emilia Murray	Australia	MF	2021–2023	10	19	29	3	
Kayla Sharples	United States	DF	2022	12	0	12	1	
Miranda Templeman	Australia	GK	2022	0	1	1	0	
MelindaJ Barbieri	Australia	MF	2022–2023	13	5	18	0	
**Katie Bowler**	Australia	MF	2022–	7	24	31	2	
**Meisha Westland**	Australia	DF	2022–	9	9	18	1	
Xiao Yuyi	China	FW	2022–2023	5	4	9	0	
Zoe Tolland	Australia	MF	2022–2023	29	8	37	0	
Sasha Coorey	Australia	MF	2023	0	6	6	0	
Erin Kontoutsikos	Australia	DF	2023	0	1	1	0	
**Chrissy Panagaris**	Australia	FW	2023–	0	18	18	1	
Hannah Blake	New Zealand	FW	2023–2024	19	2	21	3	
Jenna Holtz	United States	DF	2023–2024	7	14	21	0	
Alana Jancevski	Australia	FW	2023–2024	16	5	21	1	
Mariah Lee	United States	FW	2023–2024	12	2	14	2	
**Sarah Morgan**	Australia	FW	2023–	24	9	33	0	
Rosetta Taylor	New Zealand	MF	2023–2024	3	4	7	0	
Annabel Haffenden	Australia	DF	2023	1	3	4	0	
**Claudia Jenkins**	Australia	GK	2023–	18	0	18	0	
**Miley Grigg**	Australia	MF	2023–	0	10	10	0	
**Sian Dewey**	Australia	FW	2024–	11	4	15	0	
Grace Wilson	Australia	GK	2024	0	1	1	0	
**Erin Healy**	United States	FW	2024–	10	2	12	3	
**Tiarna Karambasis**	Australia	MF	2024–	1	10	11	0	
**Lucía León**	Dominican Republic	MF	2024–	14	0	14	1	
**Abby Middleton**	Australia	DF	2024–	0	2	2	0	
**Abby Clarke**	England	FW	2024–	0	2	2	0	
