= W-League transfers for 2010–11 season =

This is a list of Australian soccer transfers for the 2010–11 W-League. Only moves featuring at least one W-League club are listed.

== Transfers ==
All players without a flag are Australian. Clubs without a flag are clubs participating in the W-League. All transfers between W-League clubs include a free transfer period in the off-season since prior to the 2017–18 season, the W-League didn't have multi-year contracts.

=== Pre-season ===
Date	Name	Moving from	Moving to
15 January 2010	(United States) Jillian Loyden	Central Coast Mariners	(United States) Saint Louis Athletica (end of loan)
6 October 2010	(Chinese Taipei) Lin Chiung-ying	Canberra United	Unattached
6 October 2010	Bronwyn Studman	Canberra United	(United States) California Golden Bears
6 October 2010	Rebecca Kiting	Canberra United	(United States) Quinnipiac Bobcats
6 October 2010	Ellie Raymond	Canberra United	Unattached
6 October 2010	Christine Walters	Canberra United	Unattached
6 October 2010	Michelle Heyman	Central Coast Mariners	Canberra United
6 October 2010	Caitlin Cooper	Central Coast Mariners	Canberra United
6 October 2010	Lyndsay Glohe	Central Coast Mariners	Canberra United
6 October 2010	Caitlin Munoz	Unattached	Canberra United
7 October 2010	(United States) Niki Cross	(United States) Gold Pride	Newcastle Jets
14 October 2010	Caitlin Jarvie	Newcastle Jets	Unattached
14 October 2010	Emma Stewart	Newcastle Jets	Unattached
14 October 2010	Pele Ingles	Newcastle Jets	Unattached
14 October 2010	Emma Dewhurst	Newcastle Jets	Unattached
14 October 2010	Thea Slatyer	Canberra United	Newcastle Jets
14 October 2010	Sasha McDonnell	Brisbane Roar	Newcastle Jets
14 October 2010	Kara Mowbray	Melbourne Victory	Newcastle Jets
14 October 2010	(United States) Alli Lipsher	(United States) Boston Breakers	Newcastle Jets
14 October 2010	Melissa Feuerriegel	(United States) SCAD Savannah Bees	Newcastle Jets
14 October 2010	Alexandra Huynh	Unattached	Newcastle Jets
15 October 2010	(England) Stacey Day	Newcastle Jets	Adelaide United
15 October 2010	Loren Mahoney	Newcastle Jets	Adelaide United
15 October 2010	Katrina Gorry	Melbourne Victory	Adelaide United
15 October 2010	Vedrana Popovic	Melbourne Victory	Adelaide United
15 October 2010	Georgia Macri	(Australia) SASI	Adelaide United
18 October 2010	Leah Blayney	(United States) Boston Aztec	Canberra United
22 October 2010	Kate McShea	Brisbane Roar	Retired
22 October 2010	Jenna Tristram	Brisbane Roar	Retired
22 October 2010	Courtney Beutel	Brisbane Roar	Unattached
22 October 2010	Pam Bignold	Brisbane Roar	Unattached
22 October 2010	Stephanie Latham	Brisbane Roar	Unattached
22 October 2010	Leah Curtis	Brisbane Roar	Unattached
22 October 2010	Ellen Beaumont	Brisbane Roar	Unattached
22 October 2010	Laura Alleway	Melbourne Victory	Brisbane Roar
22 October 2010	Kim Carroll	Unattached	Brisbane Roar
22 October 2010	Amy Chapman	Unattached	Brisbane Roar
22 October 2010	Emily Gielnik	Unattached	Brisbane Roar
22 October 2010	Rebekah Stott	(Australia) QAS	Brisbane Roar
22 October 2010	Erika Elze	(Australia) QAS	Brisbane Roar
29 October 2010	Lisa De Vanna	Perth Glory	Unattached
29 October 2010	Emma Wirkus	Perth Glory	Unattached
29 October 2010	Ciara Conway	Perth Glory	Unattached
29 October 2010	Katarina Jukic	Perth Glory	Unattached
29 October 2010	Zoe Palandri	Perth Glory	Unattached
29 October 2010	Elissia Canham	Perth Glory	Unattached
29 October 2010	Ellis Glanfield	Perth Glory	Unattached
29 October 2010	(Denmark) Tine Cederkvist	(Sweden) Malmö	Perth Glory (loan)
29 October 2010	(Sweden) Alexandra Nilsson	(Sweden) Sunnanå	Perth Glory
29 October 2010	Lara Filocamo	(Australia) Northern Redbacks	Perth Glory
29 October 2010	Jaymee Gibbons	Unattached	Perth Glory
29 October 2010	Emily Dunn	(Australia) Northern Redbacks	Perth Glory
29 October 2010	Kathleen Waycott	(Australia) Bunbury Forum Force	Perth Glory
29 October 2010	Stacey Learmont	Unattached	Perth Glory
1 November 2010	Ashley Brown	Unattached	Melbourne Victory
1 November 2010	Brianna Davey	Unattached	Melbourne Victory
1 November 2010	(United States) Kendall Fletcher	(United States) Sky Blue	Melbourne Victory
1 November 2010	Amy Jackson	(United States) FIU Panthers	Melbourne Victory
1 November 2010	Rita Mankowska	(Australia) Heidelberg United	Melbourne Victory
1 November 2010	Ella Mastrantonio	Perth Glory	Melbourne Victory
1 November 2010	Snez Veljanovska	Canberra United	Melbourne Victory
2 November 2010	(United States) Lydia Vandenbergh	Central Coast Mariners	Sydney FC
2 November 2010	Teresa Polias	Central Coast Mariners	Sydney FC
2 November 2010	Renee Rollason	Central Coast Mariners	Sydney FC
2 November 2010	Caitlin Foord	Central Coast Mariners	Sydney FC
2 November 2010	Dimi Poulos	(Spain) Sporting de Huelva	Sydney FC
2 November 2010	Alanna Kennedy	Unattached	Sydney FC
2 November 2010	Erin Herd	Unattached	Sydney FC
4 November 2010	Katherine Ebbs	(Australia) SASI	Adelaide United
4 November 2010	Selin Kuralay	Melbourne Victory	Adelaide United
4 November 2010	(United States) Ashleigh Gunning	(United States) Charlotte Eagles	Adelaide United
4 November 2010	Katerina Bexis	Adelaide United	Unattached
4 November 2010	Tenneille Boaler	Adelaide United	Unattached
4 November 2010	Georgia Chapman	Adelaide United	Unattached
4 November 2010	Lauren Chilvers	Adelaide United	Unattached
4 November 2010	Ashlee Faul	Adelaide United	Unattached
4 November 2010	Greta French-Kennedy	Adelaide United	Unattached
4 November 2010	Thomai Kezios	Adelaide United	Unattached
4 November 2010	Rochelle Kuhar	Adelaide United	Unattached
4 November 2010	Marijana Rajcic	Adelaide United	Unattached
4 November 2010	Karina Roweth	Adelaide United	Unattached

=== Mid-season ===
Date	Name	Moving from	Moving to
20 November 2010	Lisa De Vanna	Unattached	Brisbane Roar
10 December 2010	(England) Jodie Taylor	Unattached	Melbourne Victory
18 December 2010	Monique Kofoed	Melbourne Victory	Perth Glory
22 December 2010	(Trinidad and Tobago) Kennya Cordner	Unattached	Brisbane Roar
19 January 2011	Michelle Grigg	Unattached	Newcastle Jets
28 January 2011	Michelle Grigg	Newcastle Jets	Unattached

== Re-signings ==
Date	Name	Club
6 October 2010	Ellie Brush	Canberra United
6 October 2010	Lydia Williams	Canberra United
6 October 2010	Sally Shipard	Canberra United
6 October 2010	(Chinese Taipei) Tseng Shu-o (Note: Tseng spent the off-season at Colorado Rush.)	Canberra United
6 October 2010	Ellyse Perry	Canberra United
6 October 2010	Emily van Egmond	Canberra United
6 October 2010	Kahlia Hogg	Canberra United
6 October 2010	Cian Maciejewski	Canberra United
6 October 2010	Jocelyn Mara	Canberra United
12 October 2010	Grace Gill	Canberra United
12 October 2010	Jennifer Bisset	Canberra United
12 October 2010	Ashleigh Sykes	Canberra United
12 October 2010	Nicole Sykes	Canberra United
14 October 2010	Amber Neilson	Newcastle Jets
14 October 2010	Hayley Crawford	Newcastle Jets
14 October 2010	Tara Andrews	Newcastle Jets
14 October 2010	Hannah Brewer	Newcastle Jets
14 October 2010	Carlie Ikonomou	Newcastle Jets
14 October 2010	Gema Simon	Newcastle Jets
14 October 2010	Renee Cartwright	Newcastle Jets
14 October 2010	Kate Hensman	Newcastle Jets
14 October 2010	Leia Smith	Newcastle Jets
14 October 2010	Alison Logue	Newcastle Jets
15 October 2010	Christina Papageorgiou	Adelaide United
15 October 2010	Racheal Quigley	Adelaide United
15 October 2010	Sian McLaren	Adelaide United
15 October 2010	Donna Cockayne	Adelaide United
15 October 2010	Victoria Balomenos	Adelaide United
15 October 2010	Ruth Blackburn	Adelaide United
15 October 2010	Kristi Harvey	Adelaide United
15 October 2010	Angela Fimmano	Adelaide United
22 October 2010	Clare Polkinghorne	Brisbane Roar
22 October 2010	Casey Dumont	Brisbane Roar
22 October 2010	Elise Kellond-Knight	Brisbane Roar
22 October 2010	Tameka Butt	Brisbane Roar
22 October 2010	Karla Reuter	Brisbane Roar
22 October 2010	Brooke Spence	Brisbane Roar
22 October 2010	Joanne Burgess	Brisbane Roar
22 October 2010	Alicia Foote	Brisbane Roar
22 October 2010	Lana Harch	Brisbane Roar
22 October 2010	Aivi Luik	Brisbane Roar
22 October 2010	Lauren Colthorpe	Brisbane Roar
29 October 2010	(United States) Alex Singer	Perth Glory
29 October 2010	Sam Kerr	Perth Glory
29 October 2010	Collette McCallum	Perth Glory
29 October 2010	Kate Gill (Note: Gill spent the off-season at Malmö.)	Perth Glory
29 October 2010	Tanya Oxtoby	Perth Glory
29 October 2010	Carys Hawkins	Perth Glory
29 October 2010	Shannon May	Perth Glory
29 October 2010	Elisa D'Ovidio	Perth Glory
29 October 2010	Sadie Lawrence	Perth Glory
29 October 2010	Marianna Tabain	Perth Glory
1 November 2010	Melissa Barbieri	Melbourne Victory
1 November 2010	Enza Barilla	Melbourne Victory
1 November 2010	Louisa Bisby	Melbourne Victory
1 November 2010	Stephanie Catley	Melbourne Victory
1 November 2010	Caitlin Friend	Melbourne Victory
1 November 2010	Ursula Hughson	Melbourne Victory
1 November 2010	(Turkey) Gülcan Koca	Melbourne Victory
1 November 2010	Deanna Niceski	Melbourne Victory
1 November 2010	(New Zealand) Marlies Oostdam	Melbourne Victory
1 November 2010	Maika Ruyter-Hooley	Melbourne Victory
2 November 2010	Heather Garriock (Note: Garriock spent the off-season at Chicago Red Stars.)	Sydney FC
2 November 2010	Kyah Simon	Sydney FC
2 November 2010	Servet Uzunlar (Note: Uzunlar spent the off-season at Fortuna Hjørring.)	Sydney FC
2 November 2010	Leena Khamis	Sydney FC
2 November 2010	Sarah Walsh (Note: Walsh spent the off-season at Boston Breakers.)	Sydney FC
2 November 2010	Danielle Brogan	Sydney FC
2 November 2010	Alesha Clifford	Sydney FC
2 November 2010	Kylie Ledbrook	Sydney FC
2 November 2010	Catherine Cannuli	Sydney FC
2 November 2010	Nicola Bolger	Sydney FC
2 November 2010	Teigen Allen	Sydney FC
2 November 2010	Linda O'Neill	Sydney FC
4 November 2010	Nenita Burgess	Adelaide United
19 November 2010	Nicole Paul	Melbourne Victory
