= 2008–09 Adelaide United FC (women) season =

Adelaide United (W-League)
2008–09 season
- Chairman: Mel Patzwald
- Head Coach: Michael Barnett
- W-League: 8th
- W-League Finals: DNQ
- Top goalscorer: Sandra Scalzi (4)
- Biggest win: 3–2 vs. Newcastle Jets (H) (31 October 2008); W-League; 3–2 vs. Sydney FC (H) (9 November 2008); W-League
- Biggest defeat: 0–6 vs. Central Coast Mariners (H) (6 December 2008); W-League
| Home colours | Away colours |

The 2008–09 season was Adelaide United Football Club (W-League)'s first season, in the newly formed women's league in Australia the W-League. Adelaide United finished 8th in their W-League season.

== Players ==
Note: Flags indicate national team as defined under FIFA eligibility rules; some limited exceptions apply. Players may hold more than one non-FIFA nationality.

| No. | Pos. | Nation | Player |
|---|---|---|---|
| 1 | GK | AUS | Emma Wirkus |
| 2 | DF | AUS | Renee Harrison |
| 3 | DF | AUS | Sarah Amorim |
| 4 | DF | AUS | Dianne Alagich (captain) |
| 5 | MF | AUS | Angela Fimmano |
| 6 | DF | AUS | Kristyn Swaffer |
| 7 | FW | AUS | Racheal Quigley |
| 8 | FW | AUS | Sandra Scalzi |
| 9 | FW | AUS | Stephanie Tokich |
| 10 | FW | AUS | Victoria Balomenos |

| No. | Pos. | Nation | Player |
|---|---|---|---|
| 11 | MF | AUS | Sharon Black |
| 12 | MF | AUS | Tanya Harrison |
| 13 | MF | CAN | Leah Robinson |
| 14 | MF | AUS | Donna Cockayne |
| 15 | MF | AUS | Lauren Chilvers |
| 16 | DF | AUS | Leanne Slater |
| 17 | MF | AUS | April Mann |
| 20 | GK | AUS | Sian Mclaren |
| 30 | GK | AUS | Kristi Harvey |

== Transfers ==
=== Transfers in ===
| No. | Position | Name | From | Type/fee | Date | Ref. |
|---|---|---|---|---|---|---|
| 4 | DF | Dianne Alagich | NSW Sapphires | Free transfer | 10 September 2008 | |
| 10 | FW | Victoria Balomenos | Adelaide Sensation | Free transfer | 10 September 2008 | |
| 1 | GK | (Scotland) Sian McLaren | Free agent | Free transfer | 16 October 2008 | |
| 2 | DF | Renee Harrison | Adelaide Sensation | Free transfer | 16 October 2008 | |
| 3 | DF | Sarah Amorim | Free agent | Free transfer | 16 October 2008 | |
| 5 | MF | Angela Fimmano | Free agent | Free transfer | 16 October 2008 | |
| 6 | DF | Kristyn Swaffer | Adelaide Sensation | Free transfer | 16 October 2008 | |
| 7 | FW | Rachael Quigley | Free agent | Free transfer | 16 October 2008 | |
| 8 | MF | Tanya Harrison | Adelaide Sensation | Free transfer | 16 October 2008 | |
| 9 | FW | Stephanie Tokich | Free agent | Free transfer | 16 October 2008 | |
| 11 | MF | Sharon Black | Adelaide Sensation | Free transfer | 16 October 2008 | |
| 12 | FW | Sandra Scalzi | Free agent | Free transfer | 16 October 2008 | |
| 13 | MF | (Canada) Leah Robinson | Free agent | Free transfer | 16 October 2008 | |
| 14 | MF | Donna Cockayne | Free agent | Free transfer | 16 October 2008 | |
| 15 | MF | (England) Lauren Chilvers | Free agent | Free transfer | 16 October 2008 | |
| 16 | MF | Nenita Burgess | Adelaide Sensation | Free transfer | 16 October 2008 | |
| 20 | GK | Emma Wirkus | Adelaide Sensation | Free transfer | 16 October 2008 | |
| 30 | GK | Kristi Harvey | Free agent | Free transfer | 16 October 2008 | |

== Competitions ==
=== Overall record ===
| Competition | First match | Last match | Starting round | Final position | Record | | | | | | | |
| Competition | First match | Last match | Starting round | Final position | Pld | W | D | L | GF | GA | GD | Win % |
|---|---|---|---|---|---|---|---|---|---|---|---|---|
| W-League | 25 October 2008 | 27 December 2008 | Matchday 1 | 8th | 10 | 2 | 1 | 7 | 13 | 28 | −15 | 20.00 |
| Total | | | | | 10 | 2 | 1 | 7 | 13 | 28 | −15 | 20.00 |

Source: Competitions

=== W-League ===
==== League table ====
| Pos | Team | Pld | W | D | L | GF | GA | GD | Pts | Qualification |
|---|---|---|---|---|---|---|---|---|---|---|
| 1 | Queensland Roar (C) | 10 | 8 | 1 | 1 | 27 | 7 | +20 | 25 | Qualification to Finals series |
| 2 | Newcastle Jets | 10 | 5 | 2 | 3 | 17 | 12 | +5 | 17 | Qualification to Finals series |
| 3 | Canberra United | 10 | 4 | 4 | 2 | 14 | 10 | +4 | 16 | Qualification to Finals series |
| 4 | Sydney FC | 10 | 4 | 2 | 4 | 15 | 14 | +1 | 14 | Qualification to Finals series |
| 5 | Melbourne Victory | 10 | 4 | 0 | 6 | 13 | 13 | 0 | 12 | |
| 6 | Central Coast Mariners | 10 | 4 | 0 | 6 | 15 | 20 | −5 | 12 | |
| 7 | Perth Glory | 10 | 3 | 2 | 5 | 14 | 24 | −10 | 11 | |
| 8 | Adelaide United | 10 | 2 | 1 | 7 | 13 | 28 | −15 | 7 | |

Rules for classification: 1) points; 2) goal difference; 3) number of goals scored.
(C) Champions

==== Results summary ====
| Overall | | | | | | | | Home | | | | | | Away | | | | | |
| Pld | W | D | L | GF | GA | GD | Pts | W | D | L | GF | GA | GD | W | D | L | GF | GA | GD |
|---|---|---|---|---|---|---|---|---|---|---|---|---|---|---|---|---|---|---|---|
| 10 | 2 | 1 | 7 | 13 | 28 | −15 | 7 | 2 | 0 | 3 | 7 | 16 | −9 | 0 | 1 | 4 | 6 | 12 | −6 |

Source: worldfootball.net

==== Results by round ====
| Round | 1 | 2 | 3 | 4 | 5 | 6 | 7 | 8 | 9 | 10 |
|---|---|---|---|---|---|---|---|---|---|---|
| Ground | A | H | H | A | A | H | H | A | H | A |
| Result | L | W | W | L | D | L | L | L | L | L |
| Position | 7 | 7 | 5 | 5 | 5 | 6 | 7 | 8 | 8 | 8 |
| Points | 0 | 3 | 6 | 6 | 7 | 7 | 7 | 7 | 7 | 7 |

Source: worldfootball.net
A = Away; H = Home; W = Win; D = Draw; L = Loss

==== Matches ====
The league fixtures were announced on 1 October 2008.

Win Draw Loss

| 25 October 2008 1 | Queensland Roar | 4–1 | Adelaide United | Brisbane |
| 17:00 AEST | Harch 22', 66'; Colthorpe 58'; Ferguson 64' | Report | Black 46' | Stadium: QSAC Stadium; Attendance: 835; Referee: Kirralee Gardener |

| 31 October 2008 2 | Adelaide United | 3–2 | Newcastle Jets | Adelaide |
| 16:45 ACDT | Scalzi 11', 46', 50' | Report | Day 38'; Salisbury 89' | Stadium: Hindmarsh Stadium; Referee: Sara Hodson |

| 9 November 2008 3 | Adelaide United | 3–2 | Sydney FC | Adelaide |
| 14:30 ACDT | Black 7'; Gilbert 30' (o.g.); Balomenos 48' | Report | Khamis 4'; Ledbrook 69' | Stadium: Hindmarsh Stadium; Attendance: 618; Referee: Kirralee Gardener |

| 15 November 2008 4 | Perth Glory | 3–2 | Adelaide United | Perth |
| 16:00 AWST | McCallum 25'; De Vanna 41'; Alagich 56' (o.g.) | Report | Black 90'; Cockayne 90+3' | Stadium: Members Equity Stadium; Referee: Prue Donohoe |

| 22 November 2008 5 | Canberra United | 0–0 | Adelaide United | Canberra |
| 16:00 AEDT | | Report | | Stadium: McKellar Park; Attendance: 804; Referee: Casey Reibelt |

| 29 November 2008 6 | Adelaide United | 0–3 | Melbourne Victory | Adelaide |
| 14:30 ACDT | | Report | Kuralay 36', 71'; Digiammarco 64' | Stadium: Hindmarsh Stadium; Referee: Prue Donohoe |

| 6 December 2008 7 | Adelaide United | 0–6 | Central Coast Mariners | Adelaide |
| 15:30 ACDT | | Report | Camilleri 35', 58'; Kingsley 50', 60'; Simon 62', 83' | Stadium: Hindmarsh Stadium; Referee: Kate Jacewicz |

| 14 December 2008 8 | Newcastle Jets | 2–1 | Adelaide United | Newcastle |
| 17:00 AEDT | Frostevall 35'; Neilson 81' | Report | Balomenos 19' | Stadium: Wanderers Oval; Referee: Lee Corey |

| 19 December 2008 9 | Adelaide United | 1–3 | Perth Glory | Adelaide |
| 19:30 ACDT | Scalzi 90+' | Report | Tabain 52'; McCallum 71'; D'Ovidio 86' | Stadium: Hindmarsh Stadium; Referee: Kirralee Gardener |

| 27 December 2008 10 | Sydney FC | 3–2 | Adelaide United | Sydney |
| 18:00 AEDT | Khamis 4'; Ledbrook 6'; Burgess 28' | Report | Balomenos 52'; Swaffer 59' | Stadium: Parramatta Stadium; Attendance: 795; Referee: Casey Reibelt |

== Statistics ==
=== Appearances and goals ===
Includes all competitions. Players with no appearances not included in the list.

| No. | Pos | Nat | Player | Total | | W-League | |
| No. | Pos | Nat | Player | Apps | Goals | Apps | Goals |
|---|---|---|---|---|---|---|---|
| 1 | GK | (Australia) AUS | Emma Wirkus | 4 | 0 | 4 | 0 |
| 2 | DF | (Australia) AUS | Renee Harrison | 9 | 0 | 8+1 | 0 |
| 3 | DF | (Australia) AUS | Sarah Amorim | 9 | 0 | 9 | 0 |
| 4 | DF | (Australia) AUS | Dianne Alagich | 10 | 0 | 10 | 0 |
| 5 | MF | (Australia) AUS | Angela Fimmano | 6 | 0 | 2+4 | 0 |
| 6 | DF | (Australia) AUS | Kristyn Swaffer | 10 | 1 | 10 | 1 |
| 7 | FW | (Australia) AUS | Rachael Quigley | 7 | 0 | 3+4 | 0 |
| 8 | FW | (Australia) AUS | Sandra Scalzi | 8 | 4 | 7+1 | 4 |
| 9 | FW | (Australia) AUS | Stephanie Tokich | 10 | 0 | 7+3 | 0 |
| 10 | FW | (Australia) AUS | Victoria Balomenos | 9 | 3 | 9 | 3 |
| 11 | MF | (Australia) AUS | Sharon Black | 9 | 3 | 8+1 | 3 |
| 12 | MF | (Australia) AUS | Tanya Harrison | 9 | 0 | 4+5 | 0 |
| 13 | MF | (Canada) CAN | Leah Robinson | 5 | 0 | 5 | 0 |
| 14 | FW | (Australia) AUS | Donna Cockayne | 8 | 1 | 4+4 | 1 |
| 15 | MF | (Australia) AUS | Lauren Chilvers | 8 | 0 | 4+4 | 0 |
| 16 | DF | (Australia) AUS | Leanne Slater | 3 | 0 | 2+1 | 0 |
| 17 | MF | (Australia) AUS | April Mann | 8 | 0 | 7+1 | 0 |
| 20 | GK | (Australia) AUS | Sian Fryer-McLaren | 5 | 0 | 4+1 | 0 |
| 30 | GK | (Australia) AUS | Kristi Harvey | 2 | 0 | 2 | 0 |
| | MF | (Australia) AUS | Nenita Burgess | 1 | 0 | 1 | 0 |

- Source: worldfootball.net

=== Disciplinary record ===
Includes all competitions. The list is sorted by squad number when total cards are equal. Players with no cards not included in the list.

| No. | Pos | Nat | Player | Total | | | W-League | | |
| No. | Pos | Nat | Player | Yellow card | Second yellow card | Red card | Yellow card | Second yellow card | Red card |
|---|---|---|---|---|---|---|---|---|---|
| 2 | DF | (Australia) AUS | Renee Harrison | 3 | 1 | 0 | 3 | 1 | 0 |
| 10 | FW | (Australia) AUS | Victoria Balomenos | 4 | 0 | 0 | 4 | 0 | 0 |
| 3 | DF | (Australia) AUS | Sarah Amorim | 3 | 0 | 0 | 3 | 0 | 0 |
| 15 | MF | (Australia) AUS | Lauren Chilvers | 2 | 0 | 0 | 2 | 0 | 0 |
| 6 | DF | (Australia) AUS | Kristyn Swaffer | 1 | 0 | 0 | 1 | 0 | 0 |
| 8 | FW | (Australia) AUS | Sandra Scalzi | 1 | 0 | 0 | 1 | 0 | 0 |
| 11 | MF | (Australia) AUS | Sharon Black | 1 | 0 | 0 | 1 | 0 | 0 |
| 12 | MF | (Australia) AUS | Tanya Harrison | 1 | 0 | 0 | 1 | 0 | 0 |
| 13 | MF | (Canada) CAN | Leah Robinson | 1 | 0 | 0 | 1 | 0 | 0 |
| 14 | FW | (Australia) AUS | Donna Cockayne | 1 | 0 | 0 | 1 | 0 | 0 |
| 16 | DF | (Australia) AUS | Leanne Slater | 1 | 0 | 0 | 1 | 0 | 0 |

- Source: worldfootball.net
- (yellow card) = Number of bookings; (second yellow card) = Number of sending offs after a second yellow card; (red card) = Number of sending offs by a direct red card.

== Awards ==
=== W-League ===
| Award | Player | Ref. |
|---|---|---|
| 2008–09 Hat Trick Award | Sandra Scalzi | |
