= List of Adelaide United FC (women) seasons =

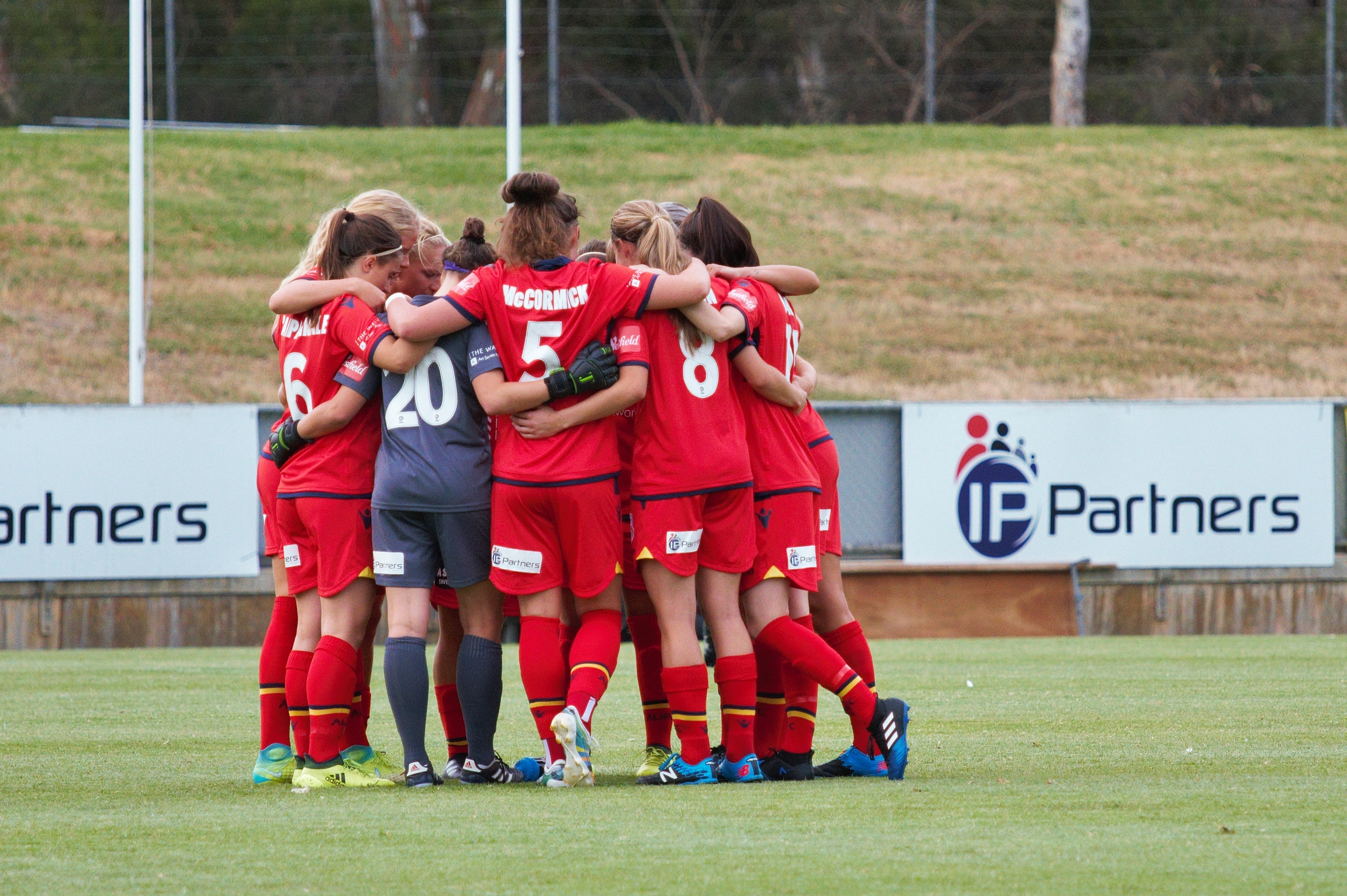
Adelaide United (W-League) players prior to a match against Sydney FC in the 2017–18 season

Adelaide United Football Club (A-League Women), is an Australian professional women's association football club based in Hindmarsh, Adelaide. The club was founded in 2008 within the foundation of the W-League (now A-League Women).

As of the end of the 2022–23 season, the club have spent 15 seasons in the A-League Women, the top division of Australian women's soccer. Their worst league finish to date is 9th in the 2017–18 season; four extra times they have finished a league season at the bottom of the table. The 2021–22 was the first season where Adelaide qualified for the Finals series, finishing in the semi-finals. Fiona Worts holds the record for most competitive goals in a single season for Adelaide United (A-League Women); she scored 13 during the 2021–22 season. The table details the league records, and the top scorers for each season.

== History ==
In the 2008–09 season, the A-League Women was founded with seven other clubs; Adelaide United finished bottom of the table winning only two games, drawing one of 10 matches. Over the next two seasons finishing in the bottom two, they did not win a single match until the 2011–12 season, winning 1–0 against the Perth Glory to end their 34-match winless streak in December 2011. Adelaide United qualified for the Finals series of the A-League Women for the first time in the 2021–22 season, doing so losing the elimination final to Melbourne Victory.

== Key ==
Key to colours and symbols:

1st or W	Winners
2nd or RU	Runners-up
3rd	Third
♦	Top scorer in division

Key to league record:

- Season = The year and article of the season
- Pos = Final position
- Pld = Games played
- W = Games won
- D = Games drawn
- L = Games lost
- GF = Goals scored
- GA = Goals against
- Pts = Points

Key to cup record:

- En-dash (–) = Adelaide United (A-League Women) did not participate
- SF = Semi-finals
- PF = Prelimainry Final
- RU = Runners-up
- W = Winners

== Seasons ==
Results of league and finals competitions by season
Season	Division	P	W	D	L	F	A	Pts	Pos	Finals	Name	Goals
Season	League										Top goalscorer	
2008–09	W-League	10	2	1	7	11	28	7	8th	—	Sandra Scalzi	4
2009	W-League	10	0	3	7	7	31	3	7th	—	Racheal Quigley	5
2010–11	W-League	10	0	0	10	4	36	0	7th	—	4 players	1
2011–12	W-League	10	1	0	9	6	30	3	7th	—	Marijana Rajčić	3
2012–13	W-League	12	2	0	10	12	40	6	8th	—	Sarah McLaughlin; Rachael Quigley	4
2013–14	W-League	12	3	4	5	12	15	13	6th	—	Kristy Moore	3
2014	W-League	12	3	1	8	9	29	10	7th	—	Kristy Moore	3
2015–16	W-League	12	3	4	5	9	12	13	5th	—	Abby Dahlkemper; Rosie Sutton	5
2016–17	W-League	12	3	5	4	31	26	14	6th	—	Adriana Jones	9
2017–18	W-League	12	3	1	8	15	27	10	9th	—	Makenzy Doniak	7
2018–19	W-League	12	5	3	4	17	19	18	6th	—	Veronica Latsko	9
2019–20	W-League	12	2	1	9	12	24	7	8th	—	Mallory Weber	4
2020–21	W-League	12	7	1	4	22	18	22	5th	—	Chelsie Dawber	5
2021–22	A-League Women	14	9	0	5	33	17	27	3rd	SF	Fiona Worts	13
2022–23	A-League Women	18	5	3	10	16	29	18	8th	—	Chelsie Dawber	4
2023–24	A-League Women	22	4	3	15	21	56	15	12th	—	3 players	3
2024–25	A-League Women	23	14	3	6	42	21	45	3rd	SF	Fiona Worts	11
2025–26	A-League Women	20	9	3	8	24	26	30	5th	EF	Erin Healy	4
