= W-League transfers for 2011–12 season =

This is a list of Australian soccer transfers for the 2011–12 W-League. Only moves featuring at least one W-League club are listed.

== Transfers ==
All players without a flag are Australian. Clubs without a flag are clubs participating in the W-League. All transfers between W-League clubs include a free transfer period in the off-season since prior to the 2017–18 season, the W-League didn't have multi-year contracts.

=== Pre-season ===
Date	Name	Moving from	Moving to
30 January 2011	Amber Neilson	Newcastle Jets	Retired
24 February 2011	(United States) Allison Lipsher	Newcastle Jets	(United States) Atlanta Beat
26 February 2011	(United States) Alex Singer	Perth Glory	(Sweden) Dalsjöfors GoIF
15 March 2011	(Denmark) Tine Cederkvist	Perth Glory	(Sweden) Linköpings (Note: Cederkvist returned to her parent club Malmö before being loaned to Linköpings.)
15 April 2011	(Chinese Taipei) Tseng Shu-o	Canberra United	(Canada) Vancouver Whitecaps
23 April 2011	(United States) Lydia Vandenbergh	Sydney FC	(United States) magicJack
27 September 2011	(New Zealand) Abby Erceg	Unattached	Adelaide United
30 September 2011	Lisa De Vanna	Brisbane Roar	Newcastle Jets
September 2011	(New Zealand) Aroon Clansey	(New Zealand) Three Kings United	Canberra United
2 October 2011	Sneź Veljanovska	Melbourne Victory	Canberra United
2 October 2011	Christine Walters	Unattached	Canberra United
2 October 2011	Georgia Yeoman-Dale	Unattached	Canberra United
2 October 2011	Hayley Raso	Unattached	Canberra United
6 October 2011	(Germany) Ariane Hingst	Unattached	Newcastle Jets
7 October 2011	(New Zealand) Anna Green	Unattached	Adelaide United
11 October 2011	(United States) Taryn Hemmings	(United States) Boston Breakers	Canberra United
11 October 2011	Emily van Egmond (Note: van Egmond spent the off-season at Fortuna Hjørring.)	Canberra United	Newcastle Jets
11 October 2011	Nicola Bolger	Sydney FC	Newcastle Jets
11 October 2011	Alanna Kennedy	Sydney FC	Newcastle Jets
11 October 2011	Linda O'Neill	Sydney FC	Newcastle Jets
11 October 2011	(United States) Danielle Johnson	(United States) Sky Blue	Melbourne Victory
11 October 2011	Rebekah Stott	Brisbane Roar	Melbourne Victory
11 October 2011	Katrina Gorry	Adelaide United	Melbourne Victory
11 October 2011	Georgie Koutrouvelis	(Australia) FFV NTC	Melbourne Victory
11 October 2011	Jackie Vogt	(Australia) FFV NTC	Melbourne Victory
11 October 2011	Laura Spiranovic	(Australia) South Melbourne	Melbourne Victory
11 October 2011	Stephanie Tanti	(Australia) Sandringham SC	Melbourne Victory
11 October 2011	Cassandra Dimovski	(Australia) Box Hill United	Melbourne Victory
12 October 2011	Hayley Crawford	Newcastle Jets	Unattached
12 October 2011	Melissa Barbieri	Melbourne Victory	Newcastle Jets
12 October 2011	(England) Stacey Day	Adelaide United	Newcastle Jets
12 October 2011	Monnique Kofoed	Perth Glory	Newcastle Jets
12 October 2011	Rhali Dobson	Unattached	Newcastle Jets
12 October 2011	Cassandra Koppen	Unattached	Newcastle Jets
12 October 2011	Bronte Bates	Unattached	Newcastle Jets
12 October 2011	Gemma Pearce	Unattached	Newcastle Jets
13 October 2011	Kate Gill (Note: Gill spent the off-season at Linköpings.)	Perth Glory	Unattached
13 October 2011	Sam Kerr	Perth Glory	Unattached
13 October 2011	Collette McCallum	Perth Glory	Unattached
13 October 2011	(Sweden) Alexandra Nilsson	Perth Glory	(Sweden) Umeå
13 October 2011	Sarah Carroll	(Australia) FW NTC	Perth Glory
13 October 2011	Shawn Billam	(Australia) FW NTC	Perth Glory
13 October 2011	Mackenzie Arnold	Unattached	Perth Glory
13 October 2011	Erika Elze	Brisbane Roar	Perth Glory
13 October 2011	Ella Mastrantonio	Melbourne Victory	Perth Glory
13 October 2011	(England) Katie Holtham	(England) Doncaster Rovers Belles	Perth Glory (loan)
14 October 2011	Emma Checker	Unattached	Adelaide United
14 October 2011	Grace Henry	Unattached	Adelaide United
14 October 2011	Ebony Philcox	Unattached	Adelaide United
14 October 2011	Daniela Di Bartolo	Unattached	Adelaide United
14 October 2011	Vanessa Reed	Unattached	Adelaide United
14 October 2011	Katherine Ebbs	Unattached	Adelaide United
17 October 2011	Lauren Colthorpe	Brisbane Roar	Unattached
17 October 2011	Catherine Cannuli	Sydney FC	Brisbane Roar
17 October 2011	Ashley Spina	(Australia) QAS	Brisbane Roar
17 October 2011	(Japan) Hoshimi Kishi	Unattached	Brisbane Roar
17 October 2011	Vedrana Popovic	Adelaide United	Brisbane Roar
17 October 2011	Sasha McDonnell	Newcastle Jets	Brisbane Roar
17 October 2011	(United States) Allison Lipsher	(United States) Atlanta Beat	Sydney FC
17 October 2011	(Cameroon) Estelle Johnson	(United States) Philadelphia Independence	Sydney FC
17 October 2011	Thea Slatyer	Newcastle Jets	Sydney FC
17 October 2011	Monique Jackson	(Australia) Macarthur Rams	Sydney FC
17 October 2011	Sham Khamis	(Australia) Macarthur Rams	Sydney FC
17 October 2011	Victoria Balomenos	Adelaide United	Sydney FC
17 October 2011	Rachael Soutar	(Australia) NSWIS	Sydney FC
17 October 2011	Alisha Bass	(Australia) NSWIS	Sydney FC
18 October 2011	Ursula Hughson	Melbourne Victory	Unattached
18 October 2011	Deanna Niceski	Melbourne Victory	Unattached
18 October 2011	(New Zealand) Marlies Oostdam	Melbourne Victory	Unattached
18 October 2011	Nicole Paul	Melbourne Victory	Unattached
18 October 2011	(United States) Megan Rapinoe	Unattached	Sydney FC
15 November 2011	(Norway) Lisa-Marie Woods	(Denmark) Fortuna Hjørring	Perth Glory

=== Mid-season ===
Date	Name	Moving from	Moving to
29 October 2011	(United States) Megan Rapinoe	Sydney FC	Unattached
8 December 2011	(Norway) Lisa-Marie Woods	Perth Glory	Unattached
28 December 2011	Kahlia Hogg	Canberra United	(United States) Florida State Seminoles
5 January 2012 (Note: Player was released to free agency before joining new club)	(New Zealand) Emma Kete	Perth Glory	Canberra United

== Re-signings ==
Date	Name	Club
15 September 2011	Brianna Davey	Melbourne Victory
30 September 2011	Tara Andrews	Newcastle Jets
30 September 2011	Hannah Brewer	Newcastle Jets
2 October 2011	Lydia Williams	Canberra United
2 October 2011	Ellie Brush	Canberra United
2 October 2011	Leah Blayney (Note: Blayney spent the off-season at Boston Breakers.)	Canberra United
2 October 2011	Caitlin Cooper	Canberra United
2 October 2011	Michelle Heyman	Canberra United
2 October 2011	Kahlia Hogg	Canberra United
2 October 2011	Caitlin Munoz	Canberra United
2 October 2011	Ellyse Perry	Canberra United
2 October 2011	Sally Shipard	Canberra United
2 October 2011	Ashleigh Sykes	Canberra United
2 October 2011	Nicole Sykes	Canberra United
2 October 2011	Grace Gill	Canberra United
2 October 2011	Jennifer Bisset	Canberra United
2 October 2011	Sally Rojahn	Canberra United
11 October 2011	(United States) Kendall Fletcher	Melbourne Victory
11 October 2011	(England) Jodie Taylor	Melbourne Victory
11 October 2011	Rita Mankowska	Melbourne Victory
11 October 2011	Ashley Brown	Melbourne Victory
11 October 2011	Maika Ruyter-Hooley	Melbourne Victory
11 October 2011	Stephanie Catley	Melbourne Victory
11 October 2011	Enza Barilla	Melbourne Victory
11 October 2011	Caitlin Friend	Melbourne Victory
11 October 2011	Amy Jackson	Melbourne Victory
11 October 2011	Louisa Bisby	Melbourne Victory
11 October 2011	(Turkey) Gülcan Koca	Melbourne Victory
12 October 2011	Alexandra Huynh	Newcastle Jets
12 October 2011	Gema Simon	Newcastle Jets
12 October 2011	Alison Logue	Newcastle Jets
13 October 2011	Tanya Oxtoby	Perth Glory
13 October 2011	(Wales) Carys Hawkins	Perth Glory
13 October 2011	Shannon May	Perth Glory
13 October 2011	Katarina Jukic	Perth Glory
13 October 2011	Sadie Lawrence	Perth Glory
13 October 2011	Jaymee Gibbons	Perth Glory
13 October 2011	Elisa D'Ovidio	Perth Glory
13 October 2011	Emily Dunn	Perth Glory
13 October 2011	Lara Filocamo	Perth Glory
13 October 2011	Marianna Tabain	Perth Glory
14 October 2011	Ruth Wallace	Adelaide United
14 October 2011	Racheal Quigley	Adelaide United
14 October 2011	Angela Fimmano	Adelaide United
14 October 2011	Donna Cockayne	Adelaide United
14 October 2011	Georgia Macri	Adelaide United
14 October 2011	Nenita Burgess	Adelaide United
14 October 2011	Sian McLaren	Adelaide United
14 October 2011	(United States) Ashleigh Gunning (Note: Gunning spent the off-season at Washington Freedom and Eskilstuna United.)	Adelaide United
14 October 2011	Leanne Slater	Adelaide United
14 October 2011	Marijana Rajcic	Adelaide United
14 October 2011	Greta French-Kennedy	Adelaide United
14 October 2011	Kristi Harvey	Adelaide United
17 October 2011	Clare Polkinghorne	Brisbane Roar
17 October 2011	Casey Dumont	Brisbane Roar
17 October 2011	Kim Carroll (Note: K. Carroll spent the off-season at Fortuna Hjørring.)	Brisbane Roar
17 October 2011	Elise Kellond-Knight (Note: Kellond-Knight spent the off-season at Fortuna Hjørring.)	Brisbane Roar
17 October 2011	Lana Harch	Brisbane Roar
17 October 2011	Tameka Butt	Brisbane Roar
17 October 2011	Emily Gielnik	Brisbane Roar
17 October 2011	Laura Alleway	Brisbane Roar
17 October 2011	Karla Reuter	Brisbane Roar
17 October 2011	Brooke Spence	Brisbane Roar
17 October 2011	Joanne Burgess	Brisbane Roar
17 October 2011	Aivi Luik	Brisbane Roar
17 October 2011	Ellen Beaumont	Brisbane Roar
17 October 2011	Kyah Simon	Sydney FC
17 October 2011	Heather Garriock (Note: Garriock spent the off-season at Malmö.)	Sydney FC
17 October 2011	Caitlin Foord	Sydney FC
17 October 2011	Sarah Walsh	Sydney FC
17 October 2011	Servet Uzunlar	Sydney FC
17 October 2011	Kylie Ledbrook	Sydney FC
17 October 2011	Leena Khamis (Note: L. Khamis spent the off-season at Fortuna Hjørring.)	Sydney FC
17 October 2011	Danielle Brogan	Sydney FC
17 October 2011	Teigen Allen	Sydney FC
17 October 2011	Teresa Polias	Sydney FC
17 October 2011	Renee Rollason	Sydney FC
17 October 2011	Brittany Whitfield	Sydney FC
