= 2010–11 Adelaide United FC (women) season =

Adelaide United (W-League)
2010–11 season
- Chairman: Greg Griffin
- Head Coach: Michael Barnett
- Stadium: Hindmarsh Stadium
- W-League: 8th
- W-League Finals: DNQ
- Top goalscorer: 4 players (1 each)
- Biggest defeat: 1–7 vs. Newcastle Jets (A) (8 January 2011); W-League
Home colours	Away colours

The 2010–11 season was Adelaide United Football Club (W-League)'s third season, in the W-League. Adelaide United finished 8th in their W-League season losing all their matches in what is currently the only Australian national league club season finishing on zero points.

== Technical staff ==
Position	Name
Head coach	(Australia) Michael Barnett
Assistant coach	(Australia) Richie Alagich
Goalkeeper coach	(Australia) Nathan Wildy

== Players ==
=== Squad ===
Note: Flags indicate national team as defined under FIFA eligibility rules; some limited exceptions apply. Players may hold more than one non-FIFA nationality.

No.	Pos.	Nation	Player
1	GK	AUS	Sian McLaren
2	FW	USA	Ashleigh Gunning
4	DF	AUS	Ruth Blackburn
5	DF	AUS	Stacey Day
7	FW	AUS	Racheal Quigley
8	MF	AUS	Katrina Gorry
9	MF	AUS	Ruth Wallace
10	MF	AUS	Victoria Balomenos
11	MF	AUS	Vedrana Popovic

No.	Pos.	Nation	Player
12	FW	AUS	Selin Kuralay
13	DF	AUS	Loren Mahoney
14	FW	AUS	Donna Cockayne
15	MF	AUS	Katherine Ebbs
16	MF	AUS	Christina Papageorgiou (Captain)
17	MF	AUS	Angela Fimmano
18	MF	AUS	Georgia Macri
19	DF	AUS	Nenita Burgess
20	GK	AUS	Kristi Harvey

== Transfers ==
=== Transfers in ===
Name	Position	Moving from
(Australia) Stacey Day	Defender	(Australia) Newcastle Jets
(Australia) Loren Mahoney	Defender	(Australia) Newcastle Jets
(Australia) Victoria Balomenos	Midfielder	
(Australia) Katherine Ebbs	Midfielder	
(Australia) Katrina Gorry	Midfielder	(Australia) Melbourne Victory
(Australia) Selin Kuralay	Midfielder	(United States) Florida State University
(Australia) Georgia Macri	Midfielder	
(United States) Ashleigh Gunning	Striker	
(Australia) Vedrana Popovic	Midfielder	(Australia) Melbourne Victory

=== Transfers out ===
Name	Position	Moving to
(Australia) Ebony Weidenbach	Defender	–
(Australia) Renee Harrison	Defender	–
(Australia) Ashlee Faul	Defender	–
(Australia) Thomai Kezios	Defender	–
(Australia) Georgia Chapman	Midfielder	–
(Australia) Lauren Chilvers	Midfielder	–
(Australia) Tenneille Boaler	Midfielder	–
(Australia) Karina Roweth	Midfielder	–
(Australia) Rochelle Kuhar	Midfielder	–
(Australia) Katerina Bexis	Striker	–
(Australia) Marijana Rajcic	Striker	–

== Competitions ==
=== Overall record ===
Competition	First match	Last match	Starting round	Final position	Record							
Competition	First match	Last match	Starting round	Final position	Pld	W	D	L	GF	GA	GD	Win %
W-League	6 November 2010	29 January 2011	Matchday 1	8th	10	0	0	10	4	36	−32	0.00
Total					10	0	0	10	4	36	−32	0.00

Source: Competitions

=== W-League ===
==== League table ====
Pos	Team	Pld	W	D	L	GF	GA	GD	Pts	Qualification
1	Sydney FC	10	8	0	2	29	9	+20	24	Qualification to Finals series
2	Brisbane Roar (C)	10	6	3	1	17	7	+10	21	Qualification to Finals series
3	Canberra United	10	5	2	3	16	9	+7	17	Qualification to Finals series
4	Melbourne Victory	10	4	3	3	12	11	+1	15	Qualification to Finals series
5	Perth Glory	10	4	1	5	11	15	−4	13	
6	Newcastle Jets	10	3	1	6	13	15	−2	10	
7	Adelaide United	10	0	0	10	4	36	−32	0	

Source: au.soccerway.com
Rules for classification: 1) points; 2) goal difference; 3) number of goals scored.
(C) Champions

==== Results summary ====
Overall								Home						Away					
Pld	W	D	L	GF	GA	GD	Pts	W	D	L	GF	GA	GD	W	D	L	GF	GA	GD
10	0	0	10	4	36	−32	0	0	0	5	2	15	−13	0	0	5	2	21	−19

Source: worldfootball.net

==== Results by round ====
Round	1	2	3	4	5	6	7	8	9	10	11	12
Ground	H	A	A	H	A	H	H	B	A	H	B	A
Result	L	L	L	L	L	L	L	B	L	L	B	L
Position	6	7	7	7	7	7	7	7	7	7	7	7
Points	0	0	0	0	0	0	0	0	0	0	0	0

Source: worldfootball.net
A = Away; H = Home; W = Win; D = Draw; L = Loss

==== Matches ====
The league fixtures were announced on 20 August 2010.

Win Draw Loss

6 November 2010 1	Adelaide United	0–2	Newcastle Jets	Adelaide
14:30 ACDT		Report	McDonnell 83', 88'	Stadium: Hindmarsh Stadium; Referee: Stacey Sasopoulos

13 November 2010 2	Perth Glory	4–0	Adelaide United	Perth
12:00 AWST	Gill 27' (pen.), 32' (pen.); May 36'; Kerr 80'	Report		Stadium: nib Stadium; Referee: Kate Jacewicz

20 November 2010 3	Sydney FC	4–1	Adelaide United	Wollongong
15:00 AEDT	Khamis 10'; Ledbrook 59'; Cannuli 80'; Foord 90+1'	Report	Gunning 41'	Stadium: WIN Stadium; Attendance: 640; Referee: Peta McCallum

26 November 2010 4	Adelaide United	0–4	Melbourne Victory	Adelaide
16:45 ACDT		Report	Fletcher 33'; Friend 47'; Taylor 53', 90+2'	Stadium: Hindmarsh Stadium; Referee: Stacey Sasopolous

4 December 2010 5	Canberra United	4–0	Adelaide United	Canberra
17:00 AEDT	Munoz 6'; Heyman 9', 16'; Brush 21'	Report		Stadium: Deakin Stadium; Attendance: 576; Referee: Kirralee Gardener
Note: Match abandoned after 68 minutes due to torrential rainfalls.

10 December 2010 6	Adelaide United	1–3	Brisbane Roar	Adelaide
16:45 ACDT	Kuralay 28'	Report	Carroll 5'; Kellond-Knight 31'; Colthorpe 38'	Stadium: Hindmarsh Stadium; Referee: Catherine Hoffman

18 December 2010 7	Adelaide United	0–4	Sydney FC	Adelaide
14:30 ACDT		Report	Khamis 16'; Simon 45', 77'; Ledbrook 53'	Stadium: Hindmarsh Stadium; Referee: Jacqui Melksham

8 January 2011 9	Newcastle Jets	7–1	Adelaide United	Newcastle
15:00 AEDT	Feuerriegel 23', 51'; Andrews 46', 52', 57', 85', 90+2'	Report	Quigley 34'	Stadium: Wanderers Oval; Referee: Kirralee Andruschak

15 January 2011 10	Adelaide United	1–2	Perth Glory	Adelaide
14:30 ACDT	Gorry 73'	Report	Kerr 16', 42'	Stadium: Hindmarsh Stadium; Referee: Catherine Hoffman

29 January 2011 12	Melbourne Victory	2–0	Adelaide United	Melbourne
17:00 AEDT	Catley 1'; Friend 85'	Report		Stadium: John Cain Memorial Reserve; Referee: Catherine Hofmann

== Squad statistics ==
Last updated 20 November 2010

No.	Pos.	Name	W-League		Total		Discipline	
No.	Pos.	Name	Apps	Goals	Apps	Goals	Yellow card	Red card
1	GK	(Australia) Sian McLaren	3	0	3	0	1	0
2	FW	(United States) Ashleigh Gunning	3	0	3	0	0	0
4	DF	(Australia) Ruth Blackburn	3	0	3	0	0	0
5	DF	(Australia) Stacey Day	3	0	3	0	0	0
7	FW	(Australia) Racheal Quigley	3	0	3	0	0	0
8	MF	(Australia) Katrina Gorry	3	0	3	0	2	0
9	MF	(Australia) Ruth Wallace	3	0	3	0	0	0
10	MF	(Australia) Victoria Balomenos	3	0	3	0	0	0
11	MF	(Australia) Vedrana Popovic	2	0	1	0	0	0
12	FW	(Australia) Selin Kuralay	2	0	2	0	0	0
13	DF	(Australia) Loren Mahoney	3	0	3	0	0	0
14	FW	(Australia) Donna Cockayne	3	0	3	0	0	0
15	MF	(Australia) Katherine Ebbs	0	0	0	0	0	0
16	MF	(Australia) Christina Papageorgiou	2	0	2	0	0	0
17	MF	(Australia) Angela Fimmano	2	0	2	0	0	0
18	MF	(Australia) Georgia Macri	1	0	1	0	0	0
19	DF	(Australia) Nenita Burgess	1	0	1	0	0	0
20	GK	(Australia) Kristi Harvey	0	0	0	0	0	0
