= List of Adelaide United FC (women) head coaches =

Adelaide United Football Club (women) is an Australian women's association football club based in Hindmarsh, Adelaide formed in 2008 within the foundation of the W-League (now A-League Women). There have been seven head coaches of Adelaide United (women).

This chronological list comprises all those who have held the position of head coach of Adelaide United (women) since their foundation in 2008. Each head coaches's entry includes his dates of tenure and the club's overall competitive record (in terms of matches won, drawn and lost), honours won and significant achievements while under his care.

== Head coaching history ==
Former NSL player Michael Barnett became the first head coach of Adelaide United (women) ahead of their inaugural season, leading the side to a bottom-of-the-table finish in the 2008–09 W-League season and a two further seasons winless, completing his stint with only 2 of 30 matches won; for the current lowest win percentage of any Adelaide United women's head coach. David Edmondson became Adelaide United (women)'s new head coach in August 2011 signing for two seasons from the 2011–12 season In Edmondson's stint, he ended their 34-match winless streak in a 1–0 win over Perth Glory in another bottom-of-the-table finish. Ross Aloisi; former Adelaide United men's player was the next head coach at August 2013 and re-signed for a further season into the 2014 season followed by Jamie Harnwell for the 2015–16 season.

In September 2016, Mark Jones signed as new head coach ahead of the 2016–17 season, but departed two weeks later to join the Newcastle Jets; making Jones' stint the shortest in the team's history of only 15 days and instead Huss Skenderovic was replaced to coach in 2016–17. Ivan Karlović signed as new head coach ahead of the 2017–18 season and lead another bottom-of-the-table finish in his inaugural season. A further three seasons were coached in which none were finished in the Finals series spots. Adrian Stenta was replaced as the new head coach in August 2020, and signed a two-year contract extension in August 2021. In the 2021–22 season, Stenta coached Adelaide United (women) into their first appearance in the A-League Women finals series. Stenta became the team's first full-time head coach in October 2023.

== Head coaches ==
- Head coach dates and nationalities are sourced from worldfootball.net and statistics are sourced from ALeagueStats.com. Win percentage is rounded to two decimal places.
- Only first-team competitive matches are counted. Wins, losses and draws are results at the final whistle; the results of penalty shoot-outs are not counted.
- Statistics are complete up to and including the match played on 31 January 2025.

Key

- M = matches played; W = matches won; D = matches drawn; L = matches lost; GF = Goals for; GA = Goals against; Win % = percentage of total matches won

List of Adelaide United FC (women) head coaches
| Name | Nationality | From | To | M | W | D | L | GF | GA | Win % | Honours | Notes |
|---|---|---|---|---|---|---|---|---|---|---|---|---|
| Michael Barnett | Australia | 1 July 2008 | 30 June 2011 | 30 | 2 | 4 | 24 | 24 | 90 | 6.67 | | |
| David Edmondson | England | 1 September 2011 | 4 February 2013 | 22 | 3 | 0 | 19 | 18 | 70 | 13.64 | | |
| Ross Aloisi | Australia | 22 August 2013 | 30 June 2015 | 24 | 6 | 5 | 13 | 21 | 37 | 25.00 | | |
| Jamie Harnwell | Australia | 1 July 2015 | 30 June 2016 | 13 | 3 | 5 | 5 | 21 | 14 | 23.08 | | |
| Mark Jones | Australia | 7 September 2016 | 22 September 2016 | 0 | 0 | 0 | 0 | 0 | 0 | — | | |
| Huss Skenderovic | Australia | 5 October 2016 | 30 June 2017 | 11 | 3 | 4 | 4 | 28 | 16 | 27.27 | | |
| Ivan Karlović | Australia | 1 July 2017 | 3 August 2020 | 48 | 17 | 6 | 25 | 66 | 80 | 35.42 | | |
| Adrian Stenta | Australia | 4 August 2020 | Present | 69 | 26 | 8 | 35 | 95 | 109 | 37.68 | | |
