= 2011–12 Adelaide United FC (women) season =

Adelaide United (W-League)
2011–12 season
- Chairman: Greg Griffin
- Head Coach: David Edmondson
- Stadium: Hindmarsh Stadium
- W-League: 7th
- W-League Finals: DNQ
- Top goalscorer: Marijana Rajcic (3)
- Biggest win: 1–0 vs. Perth Glory (H) (17 December 2010); W-League
- Biggest defeat: 0–5 vs. Canberra United (A) (7 January 2012); W-League
| Home colours | Away colours |

The 2011–12 season was Adelaide United Football Club (W-League)'s fourth season, in the W-League. Adelaide United finished 7th in their W-League season.

== Technical staff ==
| Position | Name |
|---|---|
| Head coach | (Australia) David Edmondson |
| Assistant coach | (Australia) Richie Alagich |
| Goalkeeper coach | (Australia) Daniel Godley |

== Players ==
=== Squad ===
Note: Flags indicate national team as defined under FIFA eligibility rules; some limited exceptions apply. Players may hold more than one non-FIFA nationality.

| No. | Pos. | Nation | Player |
|---|---|---|---|
| 1 | GK | AUS | Sian McLaren |
| 2 | DF | AUS | Ruth Wallace |
| 3 | DF | NZL | Anna Green |
| 4 | MF | AUS | Daniela Di Bartolo |
| 5 | DF | NZL | Abby Erceg (Captain) |
| 6 | MF | AUS | Ebony Philcox |
| 7 | FW | AUS | Racheal Quigley |
| 8 | MF | AUS | Leanne Slater |
| 9 | FW | AUS | Marijana Rajcic |
| 10 | MF | AUS | Angela Fimmano |

| No. | Pos. | Nation | Player |
|---|---|---|---|
| 11 | FW | USA | Ashleigh Gunning |
| 12 | MF | AUS | Greta French-Kennedy |
| 13 | FW | AUS | Vanessa Reed |
| 14 | FW | AUS | Donna Cockayne |
| 15 | DF | AUS | Emma Checker |
| 16 | DF | AUS | Grace Henry |
| 17 | MF | AUS | Katherine Ebbs |
| 18 | MF | AUS | Georgia Macri |
| 19 | MF | AUS | Nenita Burgess |
| 20 | GK | AUS | Kristi Harvey |

=== Transfers ===
In

| Name | Position | Moving from |
|---|---|---|
| (United States) Ashleigh Gunning | FW | (Sweden) Eskilstuna United |

Out

| Name | Position | Moving to |

== Competitions ==
=== Overall record ===
| Competition | First match | Last match | Starting round | Final position | Record | | | | | | | |
| Competition | First match | Last match | Starting round | Final position | Pld | W | D | L | GF | GA | GD | Win % |
|---|---|---|---|---|---|---|---|---|---|---|---|---|
| W-League | 22 October 2011 | 15 January 2012 | Matchday 1 | 7th | 10 | 1 | 0 | 9 | 6 | 30 | −24 | 10.00 |
| Total | | | | | 10 | 1 | 0 | 9 | 6 | 30 | −24 | 10.00 |

Source: Competitions

=== W-League ===
==== League table ====
| Pos | Team | Pld | W | D | L | GF | GA | GD | Pts | Qualification |
|---|---|---|---|---|---|---|---|---|---|---|
| 1 | Canberra United (C) | 10 | 7 | 3 | 0 | 23 | 9 | +14 | 24 | Qualification to Finals series |
| 2 | Brisbane Roar | 10 | 6 | 3 | 1 | 20 | 11 | +9 | 21 | Qualification to Finals series |
| 3 | Sydney FC | 10 | 5 | 2 | 3 | 26 | 8 | +18 | 17 | Qualification to Finals series |
| 4 | Melbourne Victory | 10 | 5 | 2 | 3 | 21 | 9 | +12 | 17 | Qualification to Finals series |
| 5 | Newcastle Jets | 10 | 4 | 0 | 6 | 18 | 22 | −4 | 12 | |
| 6 | Perth Glory | 10 | 2 | 0 | 8 | 11 | 36 | −25 | 6 | |
| 7 | Adelaide United | 10 | 1 | 0 | 9 | 6 | 30 | −24 | 3 | |

Source: au.soccerway.com
Rules for classification: 1) points; 2) goal difference; 3) number of goals scored.
(C) Champions

==== Results summary ====
| Overall | | | | | | | | Home | | | | | | Away | | | | | |
| Pld | W | D | L | GF | GA | GD | Pts | W | D | L | GF | GA | GD | W | D | L | GF | GA | GD |
|---|---|---|---|---|---|---|---|---|---|---|---|---|---|---|---|---|---|---|---|
| 10 | 1 | 0 | 9 | 6 | 30 | −24 | 3 | 1 | 0 | 4 | 5 | 14 | −9 | 0 | 0 | 5 | 1 | 16 | −15 |

Source: worldfootball.net

==== Results by round ====
| Round | 1 | 2 | 3 | 4 | 5 | 6 | 7 | 8 | 9 | 10 | 11 | 12 |
|---|---|---|---|---|---|---|---|---|---|---|---|---|
| Ground | H | A | A | H | A | H | B | A | H | B | A | H |
| Result | L | L | L | L | L | L | B | L | W | B | L | L |
| Position | 7 | 7 | 7 | 7 | 7 | 7 | 7 | 7 | 6 | 6 | 6 | 7 |
| Points | 0 | 0 | 0 | 0 | 0 | 0 | 0 | 0 | 3 | 3 | 3 | 3 |

Source: worldfootball.net
A = Away; H = Home; W = Win; D = Draw; L = Loss

==== Matches ====
Win Draw Loss

| 22 October 2011 1 | Adelaide United | 1–4 | Canberra United | Adelaide |
| 13:45 ACDT | Quigley 36' | Report | Heyman 2', 82'; Munoz 61', 70' | Stadium: Hindmarsh Stadium; Referee: Stacey Sasopoulos |

| 29 October 2011 2 | Newcastle Jets | 3–0 | Adelaide United | Newcastle |
| 14:00 AEDT | O'Neill 5'; De Vanna 47', 68' | Report | | Stadium: Adamstown Oval; Attendance: 847; Referee: Casey Reibelt |

| 5 November 2011 3 | Perth Glory | 2–1 | Adelaide United | Perth |
| 12:00 AWST | Elze 6'; Jukic 37' | Report | Quigley 2' | Stadium: nib Stadium; Referee: Casey Reibelt |

| 12 November 2011 4 | Adelaide United | 1–2 | Brisbane Roar | Adelaide |
| 16:00 ACDT | Rajcic 76' | Report | Polkinghorne 38'; Spina 63' | Stadium: Burton Park; Referee: Catherine Hoffman |

| 19 November 2011 5 | Melbourne Victory | 4–0 | Adelaide United | Melbourne |
| 17:00 AEDT | Friend 16', 57', 80'; Taylor 23' | Report | | Stadium: Veneto Club; Attendance: 556; Referee: Catherine Hoffman |

| 26 November 2011 6 | Adelaide United | 1–4 | Sydney FC | Adelaide |
| 14:30 ACDT | Rajcic 30' | Report | Garriock 38'; Uzunlar 42'; McLaren 76' (o.g.); Foord 78' | Stadium: Hindmarsh Stadium; Referee: Stacey Sasopolous |

| 10 December 2011 8 | Brisbane Roar | 2–0 | Adelaide United | Sunshine Coast |
| 14:00 AEST | Luik 6'; Gielnik 90' | Report | | Stadium: Sunshine Coast Stadium; Referee: Rebecca Durcau |

| 17 December 2011 9 | Adelaide United | 1–0 | Perth Glory | Adelaide |
| 16:30 ACDT | Ebbs 33' | Report | | Stadium: Burton Park; Referee: Stacey Sasopolous |

| 7 January 2012 11 | Canberra United | 5–0 | Adelaide United | Canberra |
| 15:00 AEDT | Heyman 28', 34'; Hemmings 83', 85'; Sykes 90+2' | Report | | Stadium: McKellar Park; Referee: Rebecca Durcau |

| 15 January 2012 12 | Adelaide United | 1–4 | Melbourne VIctory | Adelaide |
| 15:00 ACDT | Rajcic 21' | Report | Gorry 31'; Brown 36'; Friend 45'; Fletcher 90' | Stadium: Burton Park; Referee: Stacey Sasopolous |

== Statistics ==
| No. | Pos. | Name | W-League | | Total | | Discipline | |
| No. | Pos. | Name | Apps | Goals | Apps | Goals | Yellow card | Red card |
|---|---|---|---|---|---|---|---|---|
| 1 | GK | (Australia) Sian McLaren | 0 | 0 | 0 | 0 | 0 | 0 |
| 2 | DF | (Australia) Ruth Wallace | 2 | 0 | 2 | 0 | 1 | 0 |
| 3 | DF | (New Zealand) Anna Green | 2 | 0 | 2 | 0 | 0 | 0 |
| 4 | MF | (Australia) Daniela Di Bartolo | 0 | 0 | 0 | 0 | 0 | 0 |
| 5 | DF | (New Zealand) Abby Erceg | 2 | 0 | 2 | 0 | 0 | 0 |
| 6 | MF | (Australia) Ebony Philcox | 0 | 0 | 0 | 0 | 0 | 0 |
| 7 | FW | (Australia) Racheal Quigley | 2 | 1 | 2 | 1 | 0 | 0 |
| 8 | MF | (Australia) Leanne Slater | 2 | 0 | 2 | 0 | 0 | 0 |
| 9 | FW | (Australia) Marijana Rajcic | 1 | 0 | 1 | 0 | 0 | 0 |
| 10 | MF | (Australia) Angela Fimmano | 0 | 0 | 0 | 0 | 0 | 0 |
| 11 | FW | (United States) Ashleigh Gunning | 1 | 0 | 1 | 0 | 0 | 0 |
| 12 | MF | (Australia) Greta French-Kennedy | 1 | 0 | 1 | 0 | 0 | 0 |
| 13 | FW | (Australia) Vanessa Reed | 1 | 0 | 1 | 0 | 0 | 0 |
| 14 | FW | (Australia) Donna Cockayne | 2 | 0 | 2 | 0 | 0 | 0 |
| 15 | DF | (Australia) Emma Checker | 1 | 0 | 1 | 0 | 0 | 0 |
| 16 | DF | (Australia) Grace Henry | 1 | 0 | 1 | 0 | 0 | 0 |
| 17 | MF | (Australia) Katherine Ebbs | 2 | 0 | 2 | 0 | 2 | 1 |
| 18 | MF | (Australia) Georgia Macri | 1 | 0 | 1 | 0 | 0 | 0 |
| 19 | MF | (Australia) Nenita Burgess | 1 | 0 | 1 | 0 | 0 | 0 |
| 20 | GK | (Australia) Kristi Harvey | 2 | 0 | 2 | 0 | 0 | 0 |
