= Wirkus =

Wirkus is a surname from Lithuanian meaning "to cry", or from Polish meaning "top". Notable people with the surname include:

- Emma Wirkus (born 1982), Australian soccer player
- Faustin E. Wirkus (1896–1945), American soldier
