= 2008–09 W-League =

Inaugural season of the top women's football (soccer) league in Australia

W-League
- Season: 2008–09
- Dates: 25 October 2008 – 17 January 2009
- Matches: 41
- Goals: 130 (3.17 per match)
- Biggest home win: Queensland Roar 4–1 Adelaide United (25 October 2008); Melbourne Victory 3–0 Perth Glory (8 November 2008); Newcastle Jets 4–1 Perth Glory (23 November 2008); Queensland Roar 3–0 Sydney FC (29 November 2008)
- Biggest away win: Adelaide United 0–6 Central Coast Mariners (6 December 2008)
- Highest scoring: Perth Glory 3–5 Queensland Roar (7 December 2008)

The 2008–09 W-League was the first season of the W-League, the top Australian professional women's soccer league, since its establishment in 2008.

The season was played over 10 rounds, followed by a finals series. Queensland Roar were crowned as Premiers for winning the home-and-away season and also Champions after defeating Canberra United 2–0 in the Grand Final.

== Clubs ==
Eight clubs competed in the league.

Team	Location	Stadium	Capacity
Adelaide United	Adelaide	Hindmarsh Stadium	16,500
Canberra United	Canberra	McKellar Park	3,500
Central Coast Mariners	Gosford	Parramatta Stadium	24,000
Melbourne Victory	Melbourne	Bob Jane Stadium	12,000
Newcastle Jets	Newcastle	Wanderers Oval	1,000
Perth Glory	Perth	Members Equity Stadium	20,500
Queensland Roar	Brisbane	Ballymore Stadium	18,000
Sydney FC	Sydney	Parramatta Stadium	24,000

=== Foreign players ===
Club	Visa 1	Visa 2	Visa 3	Non-Visa foreigner(s)	Former player(s)
Adelaide United	(Canada) Leah Robinson				
Canberra United					
Central Coast Mariners					
Melbourne Victory	(Canada) Brittany Timko	(New Zealand) Marlies Oostdam	(New Zealand) Rebecca Tegg		
Newcastle Jets	(England) Kirstyn Pearce	(New Zealand) Rebecca Smith	(Sweden) Sanna Frostevall	(England) Stacey Day^{B}	
Perth Glory	(England) Katy Coghlan	(Singapore) Lim Shiya		(Wales) Carys Hawkins^{A}	
Queensland Roar					
Sydney FC					

The following do not fill a Visa position:
^{A} Australian citizens who have chosen to represent another national team;
^{B} Those players who were born and started their professional career abroad but have since gained Australian citizenship;
^{G} Guest players;
^{R} Injury replacement players, or national team replacement players;

== Regular season ==
=== League table ===
Pos	Team	Pld	W	D	L	GF	GA	GD	Pts	Qualification
1	Queensland Roar (C)	10	8	1	1	27	7	+20	25	Qualification to Finals series
2	Newcastle Jets	10	5	2	3	17	12	+5	17	Qualification to Finals series
3	Canberra United	10	4	4	2	14	10	+4	16	Qualification to Finals series
4	Sydney FC	10	4	2	4	15	14	+1	14	Qualification to Finals series
5	Melbourne Victory	10	4	0	6	13	13	0	12	
6	Central Coast Mariners	10	4	0	6	15	20	−5	12	
7	Perth Glory	10	3	2	5	14	24	−10	11	
8	Adelaide United	10	2	1	7	13	28	−15	7	

Rules for classification: 1) points; 2) goal difference; 3) number of goals scored.
(C) Champions

=== Results ===
Home \ Away	ADL	CAN	CCM	MVC	NEW	PER	QLD	SYD
Adelaide United	—	—	0–6	0–3	3–2	1–3	—	3–2
Canberra United	0–0	—	1–2	3–2	—	—	1–1	1–1
Central Coast Mariners	—	0–3	—	2–0	2–4	3–1	0–5	—
Melbourne Victory	—	0–1	2–0	—	1–0	3–0	1–3	—
Newcastle Jets	2–1	2–1	—	—	—	4–1	0–2	2–0
Perth Glory	3–2	2–2	—	—	0–0	—	3–5	0–4
Queensland Roar	4–1	0–1	2–0	2–0	—	—	—	3–0
Sydney FC	3–2	—	2–0	2–1	1–1	0–1	—	—

Source: WorldFootball.net
Legend: Blue = home team win; Yellow = draw; Red = away team win.

== Finals series ==
Semi-finals
1	Queensland Roar	1 (5)
4	Sydney FC	1 (4)
2	Newcastle Jets	0
3	Canberra United	1

Grand Final
1	Queensland Roar	2
3	Canberra United	0

=== Semi-finals ===
10 January 2009	Newcastle Jets	0–1	Canberra United	Newcastle
16:00 AEST			Mowbray 25'	Stadium: Wanderers Oval; Attendance: 2,889; Referee: Sara Hodson

11 January 2009	Queensland Roar	1–1 (a.e.t.)	Sydney FC	Brisbane
16:00 AEST	Yallop 29'		O'Neill 71'	Stadium: Ballymore Stadium; Attendance: 1,891; Referee: Jacqui Melksham
	Penalties
	Dumont (penalty scored); Yallop (penalty scored); Kellond-Knight (penalty scored); Harch (penalty scored); Beaumont (penalty missed); Reuter (penalty scored)		Brogan (penalty scored); Bolger (penalty missed); Clifford (penalty scored); Ledbrook (penalty scored); Khamis (penalty scored); Walsh (penalty missed)

=== Grand Final ===
17 January 2009	Queensland Roar	2–0	Canberra United	Brisbane
16:00 AEST	Harch 6'; Yallop 26'			Stadium: Ballymore Stadium; Attendance: 4,553; Referee: Kate Jacewicz

== Leading scorers ==
Total	Player		Club	Goals per Game									
Total	Player		Club	1	2	3	4	5	6	7	8	9	10
7	(Australia)	Leena Khamis	Sydney FC	2	1	1	1	1					1
6	(Australia)	Courtney Beutel	Queensland Roar			1		1	1	1	1	1	
6	(Australia)	Katie Gill	Newcastle Jets	2			1	1				2	
5	(Australia)	Lana Harch	Queensland Roar	2			1			1		1	
5	(Australia)	Kyah Simon	Central Coast Mariners			2			1	2			
4	(Australia)	Lauren Colthorpe	Queensland Roar	1		1	1		1				
4	(Australia)	Caitlin Munoz	Canberra United						1	1	1		1
4	(Australia)	Sandra Scalzi	Adelaide United		3							1	
4	(Australia)	Marianna Tabain	Perth Glory					1		1	1	1	

Goal scored from penalty kick

== Awards ==
The following end of the season awards were announced at the 2008–09 Westfield W-League Awards night that took place on 21 January 2009.

- Player of the Year: Lana Harch, Queensland Roar
- Goalkeeper of the Year: Melissa Barbieri, Melbourne Victory
- Golden Boot: Leena Khamis, Sydney FC – 7 goals
- Goal of the Year: Marianna Tabain, Perth Glory – Round 9, Adelaide United v Perth Glory
- Fair Play Award: Queensland Roar
- Referee of the Year: Jacqui Melksham
- Coach of the Year: Jeff Hopkins, Queensland Roar

== See also ==
- Adelaide United W-League season 2008-09
- Queensland Roar W-League season 2008-09
- Canberra United W-League season 2008-09
- Central Coast Mariners W-League season 2008-09
- Melbourne Victory FC W-League season 2008-09
- Newcastle Jets W-League season 2008-09
- Perth Glory W-League season 2008-09
- Sydney FC W-League season 2008-09
