= Ellen Beaumont =

Australian football player (born 1985)

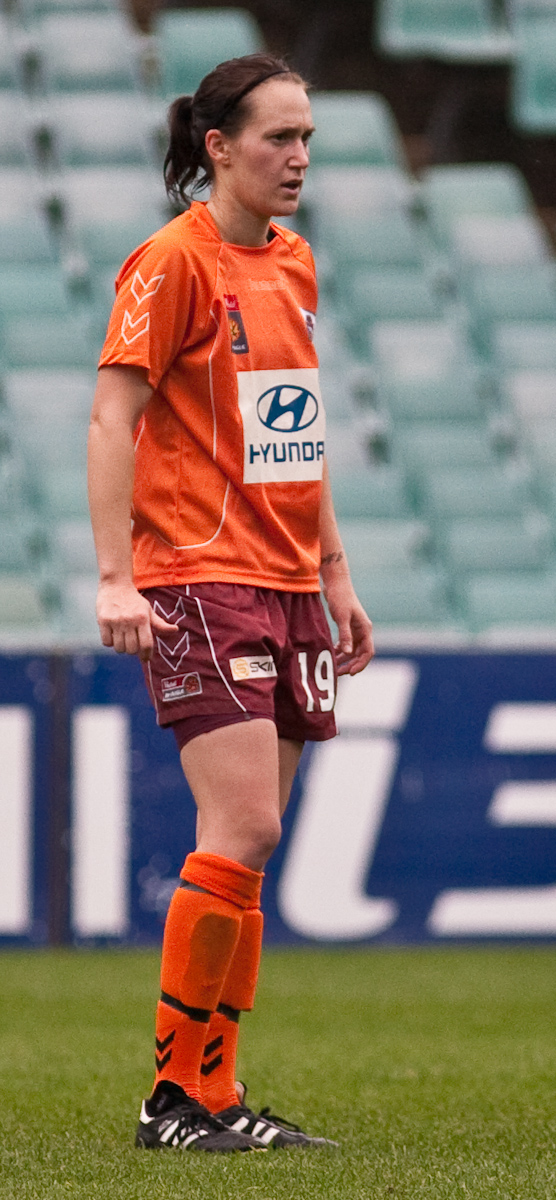
- Beaumont playing for Brisbane Roar in 2009

Personal information
- Full name: Ellen Lee Beaumont
- Date of birth: 14 July 1985 (age 41)
- Place of birth: Brisbane, Australia
- Height: 1.71 m (5 ft 7 1/2 in)
- Position: Midfielder

Youth career
- The Gap
- Westside United
- Grange Thistle

Senior career*
Years	Team	Apps	(Gls)
1998–2001	The Gap		
2002	Newmarket FC		
2002–2008	Queensland Sting		
2008–2012	Brisbane Roar	30	(3)

International career^{‡}
2007–	Australia	3	(0)
- * Club domestic league appearances and goals as of 16 October 2017 ‡ National team caps and goals as of 3 July 2011

Ellen Lee Beaumont (born 14 July 1985) is an Australian association football player who played for Australian W-League team Brisbane Roar.

== Honours ==
With Brisbane Roar:

- W-League Premiership: 2008–09
- W-League Championship: 2008–09
