= Kristyn Swaffer =

Australian soccer player

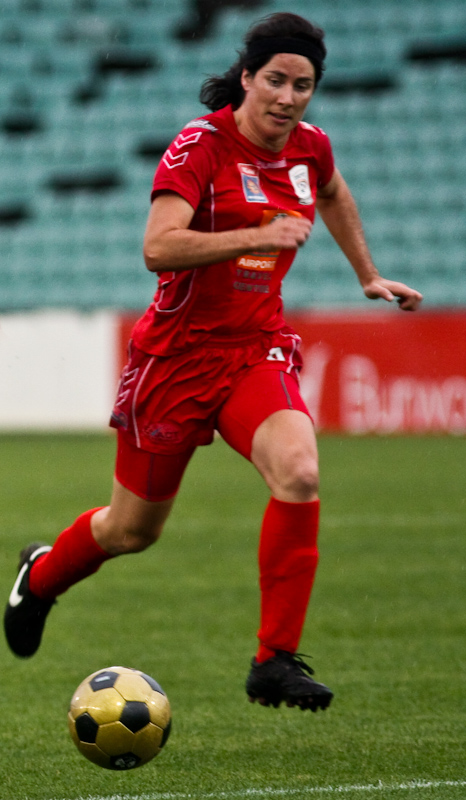
- Swaffer playing for Adelaide United in 2008

Personal information
- Full name: Kristyn Swaffer
- Date of birth: 13 December 1975 (age 50)
- Place of birth: Adelaide, Australia
- Height: 1.76 m (5 ft 9 in)
- Position: Defender

Youth career
- Metrostars

Senior career*
Years	Team	Apps	(Gls)
- Cumberland
- Sturt Marion
2008–2009	Adelaide United	10	(1)

International career^{‡}
1996–2003	Australia	30	(1)
- * Club domestic league appearances and goals as of 24 February 2009 ‡ National team caps and goals as of 3 July 2011

Kristyn Swaffer (born 13 December 1975) is an Australian association footballer who played for Australian W-League team Adelaide United.

Swaffer was part of the Australia squad at the 1999 FIFA Women's World Cup in the United States.
