= Ruth Blackburn =

Australian football player

Personal information
- Full name: Ruth Blackburn
- Date of birth: 27 May 1992 (age 34)
- Place of birth: Brisbane, Australia
- Height: 1.82 m (5 ft 11 1/2 in)
- Position: Defender

Senior career*
Years	Team	Apps	(Gls)
- The Gap
2008–2009	Queensland Roar	7	(0)
2009–2011	Adelaide United	8	(0)
2011–2015	The Gap		
2015–2016	Brisbane Roar	12	(2)
- * Club domestic league appearances and goals as of 21 October 2016

Ruth Blackburn (born 27 May 1992) is an Australian football (soccer) player who last played for Australian W-League team Brisbane Roar.

== Personal life ==
Outside of her sports career, she has worked as a researcher. Her work has included research into the use of medical cannabis for children with epilepsy.

== Honours ==
With Brisbane Roar:

- W-League Premiership: 2008–09
- W-League Championship: 2008–09
