= Leah Robinson (soccer) =

Canadian soccer player (born 1982)

Personal information
- Full name: Leah Robinson
- Date of birth: 29 May 1982 (age 44)
- Place of birth: Lower Sackville, Nova Scotia, Canada
- Position: Midfielder

College career
Years	Team	Apps	(Gls)
2000–2003	VCU Rams		

Senior career*
Years	Team	Apps	(Gls)
2001	Vancouver Breakers		
2002	Memphis Mercury		
2003–2007	Ottawa Fury	65	(24)
2006	Jitex BK		
2008	Jersey Sky Blue	11	(0)
2008–2009	Adelaide United	5	(0)

International career^{‡}
2003	Canada U23	1	(0)
2001–2009	Canada	5	(0)
- * Club domestic league appearances and goals as of April 3, 2009 ‡ National team caps and goals as of June 4, 2013

Leah Robinson (born 29 May 1982) is a Canadian soccer player who last played for Australian W-League team Adelaide United.

== Club career ==
Robinson signed for Jersey Sky Blue of the W-League in 2008.

== International career ==
She has made five appearances for the Canadian national team, appearing in both the 2001 Algarve Cup and the 2003 Pan American Games.
