= Michael Barnett (soccer) =

Australian soccer player and manager

Mike Barnett
Personal information
- Full name: Michael Barnett
- Place of birth: Australia
- Position: Defender

Youth career
- 1982–1983: AIS

Senior career*
Years	Team	Apps	(Gls)
1984	Canberra Arrows		
1985–1987	West Adelaide Hellas		
1988	Adelaide Croatia	21	(1)
1989	West Adelaide	21	(0)
1990–1991	Adelaide Croatia	35	(0)
1992	West Adelaide Hellas		
1993	Adelaide Croatia	14	(0)
1994–1995	Adelaide Raiders	34	(0)
1996	Noarlunga United	18	(0)

Managerial career
- 2003–2009: MetroStars
- 2008–2011: Adelaide United W-League
- 2011–2012: Adelaide Raiders
- * Club domestic league appearances and goals as of 21 March 2012

Michael Barnett is an Australian former soccer player who played as a defender. He last played for Adelaide Raiders.
