= Emma Wirkus =

Australian soccer player

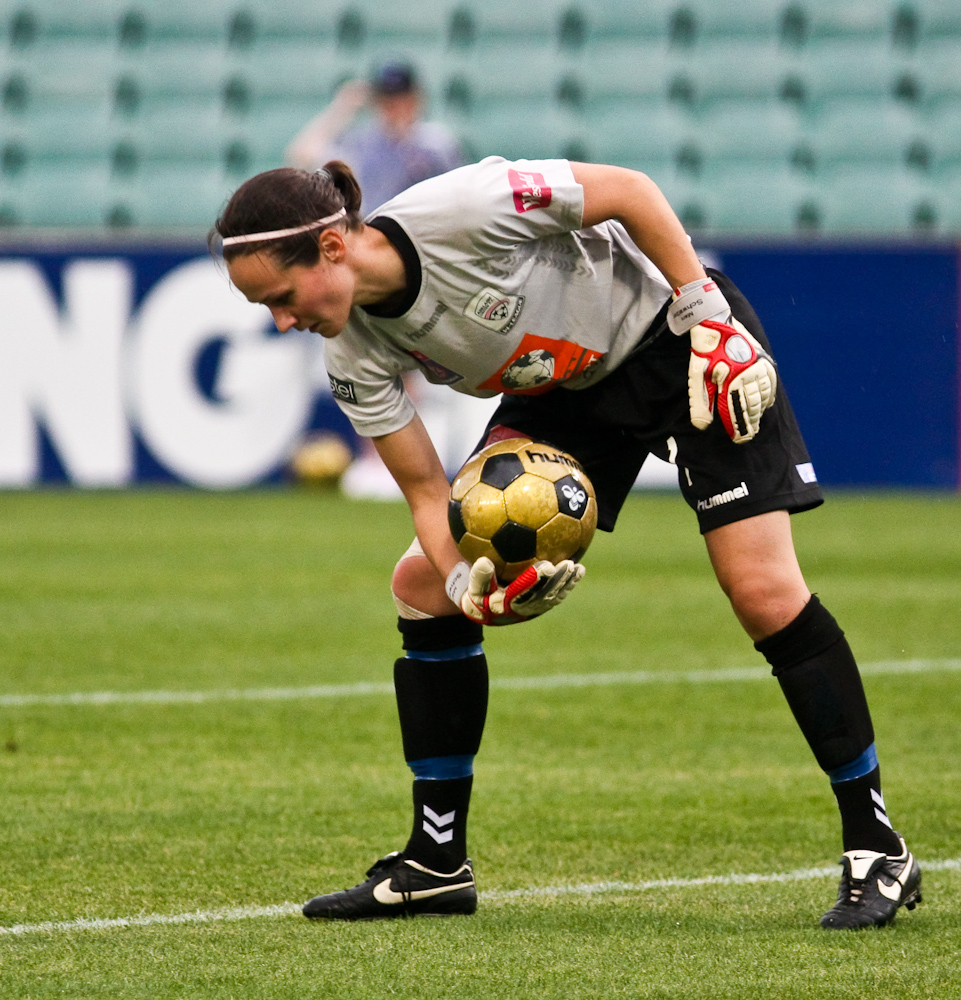

Personal information
- Full name: Emma Wirkus
- Date of birth: 11 January 1982 (age 44)
- Place of birth: Stirling, South Australia, Australia
- Height: 1.71 m (5 ft 7 in)
- Position: Goalkeeper

Senior career*
Years	Team	Apps	(Gls)
- Australian Institute of Sport
1996–2000	South Australian Sports Institute		
2000–2004	Adelaide Sensation	16	(0)
2008–2009	Adelaide United	4	(0)
2009	Perth Glory	10	(0)

International career
2005–2007	Australia	7	(0)
- * Club domestic league appearances and goals

Emma Wirkus (born 11 January 1982) is an Australian former soccer player who played in the Australian Women's National Soccer League for the South Australian Sports Institute and Adelaide Sensation before playing in the W-League for Adelaide United and Perth Glory. She also played for the Australia women's national soccer team.
