= Stacey Day =

English footballer

Personal information
- Full name: Stacey Day
- Date of birth: 29 November 1988 (age 37)
- Place of birth: Harrow, England
- Height: 1.80 m (5 ft 11 in)
- Position: Defender

Youth career
- 2003–2008: Adelaide Sensation

Senior career*
Years	Team	Apps	(Gls)
2008–2010	Newcastle Jets	19	(1)
2010–2011	Adelaide United	10	(0)
2011–2014	Newcastle Jets	32	(0)
- * Club domestic league appearances and goals as of 13 March 2014

Stacey Day is an English association footballer who played for Newcastle Jets and Adelaide United in the Australian W-League.

== Career ==
Day also played with Merewether United in the Northern NSW Women's Premier League in the 2009 season.

Prior to the 2014 W-League, she suffered an anterior cruciate ligament injury which kept her out of football for two and a half years.
