= Sandra Scalzi =

Australian soccer player

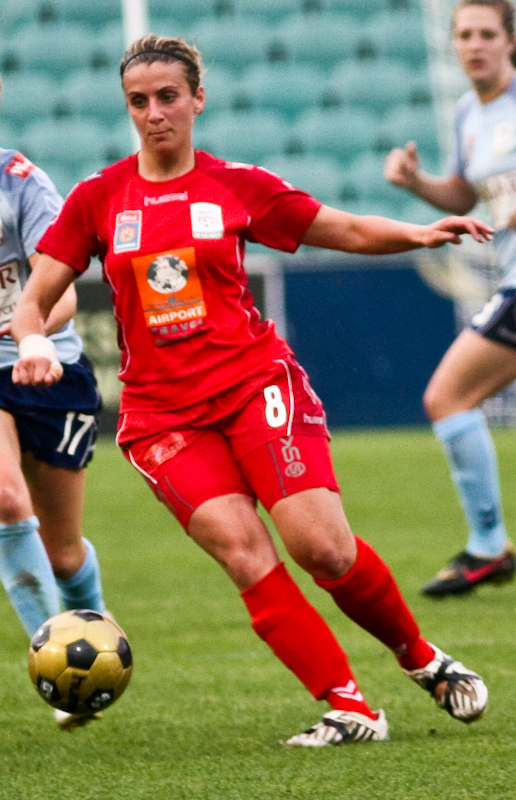
- Scalzi playing for Adelaide United in 2008

Personal information
- Full name: Sandra Scalzi
- Date of birth: 17 March 1986 (age 40)
- Place of birth: Adelaide, Australia
- Height: 1.62 m (5 ft 4 in)
- Position: Striker

Senior career*
Years	Team	Apps	(Gls)
- Adelaide City
2008–2009	Adelaide United	8	(4)
- * Club domestic league appearances and goals as of 23 February 2009

Sandra Scalzi (born 17 March 1986) is an Australian association footballer who played for Australian W-League team Adelaide United. She scored the first hat-trick in the W-league against Newcastle Jets on 31 October 2008. She is related to fellow footballer Isabella Scalzi.
