= Leena Khamis =

Australian soccer player

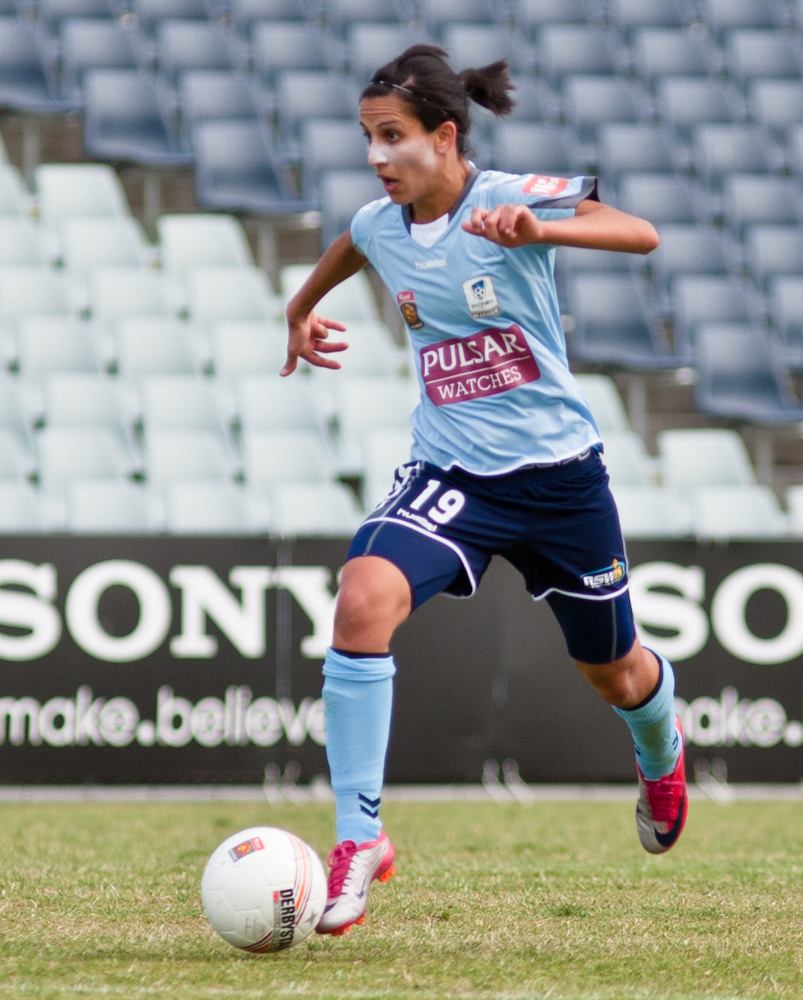
- Khamis with Sydney FC in 2010

Personal information
- Full name: Leena Khamis
- Date of birth: 19 June 1986 (age 40)
- Place of birth: Camden, New South Wales, Australia
- Height: 1.68 m (5 ft 6 in)
- Position: Centre forward

Team information
- Current team: Gladesville Ravens
- Number: 19

Youth career
- NSW Institute of Sport
- Macarthur Rams
- 2003–2004: Northern NSW Pride
- 2004–2008: NSW Sapphires White

Senior career*
Years	Team	Apps	(Gls)
- Macarthur Rams
2008–2011	Sydney FC	35	(23)
2011	Fortuna Hjørring		
2011–2012	Sydney FC	7	(4)
2012	Fortuna Hjørring		
2013–2018	Sydney FC	52	(12)
2018–2019	Western Sydney Wanderers	11	(2)
2019–2020	Canberra United	12	(2)
2020–2021	Western Sydney Wanderers	10	(2)
2022	Perth Glory	5	(1)
2022–2025	Macarthur Rams	43	(19)
2025–2026	Western City Rangers	0	(0)
2026–	Gladesville Ravens	0	(0)

International career^{‡}
2004–2006	Australia U-20	13	(9)
2008–	Australia	25	(5)
- * Club domestic league appearances and goals as of 02:14, 28 June 2024 (UTC) ‡ National team caps and goals as of 18 June 2015

Leena Khamis (Note: Syriac: ܠܝܢܐ ܚܡܝܣ, [ˈliː.nə ˈχa.mis] or [ˈliː.nə ˈħa.mis]; Arabic: لينا خميس, [liː.næ χe.miːs]) (born 19 June 1986) is an Australian soccer player who plays for Gladesville Ravens as a forward.

== Biography ==
Khamis was born in the Sydney suburb of Camden and is of Assyrian heritage. Her family is heavily involved in football, her father played the game before emigrating to Australia from Iraq and two of her sisters are involved at Sydney FC. Her older sister, Linda, is an assistant coach and her younger sister, Sham, is a team-mate.

== Playing career ==
She represented Australia at the 2004 FIFA World Under 19 Women's Championship in Thailand. She finished the inaugural W-League season as top scorer with 7 goals, winning the Golden Boot award.

Khamis made her full international debut for Australia in July 2008 in a match against China in Beijing.

After playing at Sydney FC since their inaugural season, Khamis signed with Western Sydney Wanderers for the 2018–19 season. She was one of several players who made the switch from Sydney FC to rivals Western Sydney during the offseason.

Khamis departed Western Sydney Wanderers ahead of the 2021–22 A-League Women season.

In January 2022, Khamis joined A-League Women club Perth Glory on a short-term injury replacement contract, due to injuries to Cyera Hintzen, Susan Phonsongkham, and Demi Koulizakis.

Khamis has also played for the Gladesville Ravens in the NSW NPL Women's competition.

== Career statistics ==
=== International ===
Scores and results list Australia's goal tally first.

#	Date	Venue	Opponent	Score	Result	Competition
1	12 July 2008	North Sydney Oval, Sydney, Australia	New Zealand	1–0	1–0	Friendly
2	20 February 2010	Bill McKinlay Park, Auckland, New Zealand	New Zealand	3–0	3–0	Friendly
3	19 May 2010	Chengdu Sports Centre, Chengdu, China	Vietnam	1–0	2–0	2010 AFC Women's Asian Cup
4	12 May 2011	Bluetongue Stadium, Gosford, Australia	New Zealand	3–0	3–0	Friendly
5	3 July 2011	Ruhrstadion, Bochum, Germany	Equatorial Guinea	1–0	3–2	2011 FIFA Women's World Cup

== Honours ==
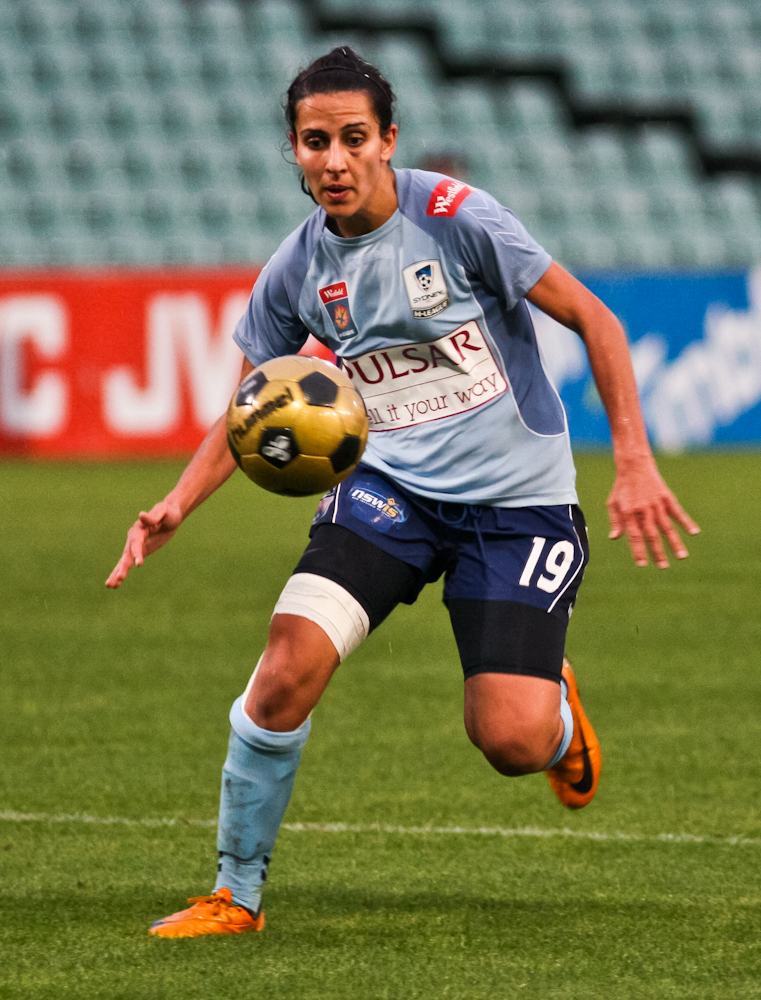
Khamis playing for Sydney FC

=== Club ===
Sydney FC

- W-League Premiership: 2009, 2010–11
- W-League Championship: 2009

=== Country ===
Australia

- AFC Women's Asian Cup: 2010
- AFF Women's Championship: 2008
- OFC U-20 Women's Championship: 2004

=== Individual ===
- W-League Golden Boot: 2008–09
