= Victoria Balomenos =

Australian football player

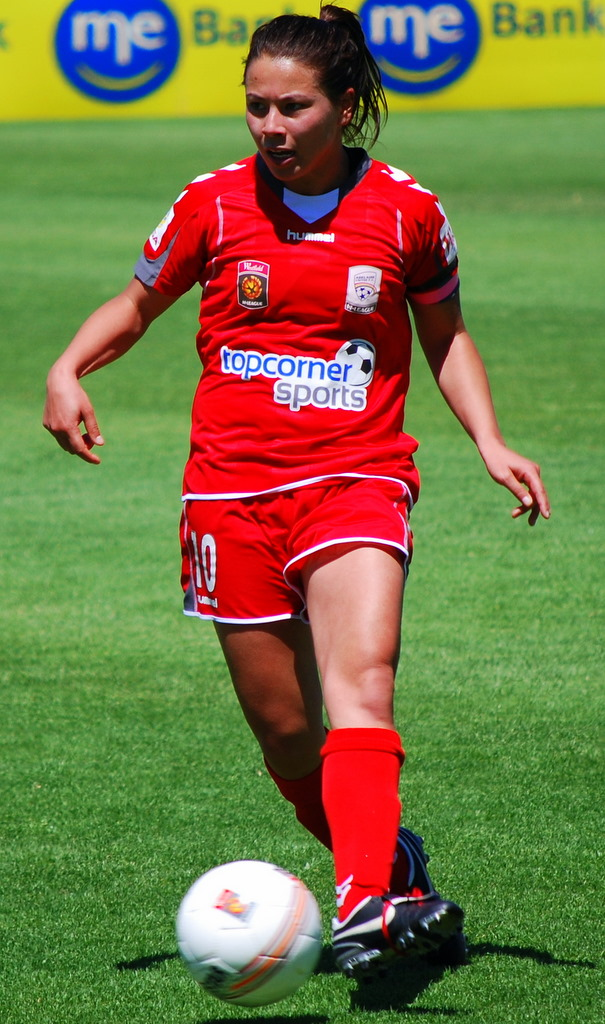
- Balomenos in action for Adelaide United

Personal information
- Full name: Victoria Balomenos
- Date of birth: 14 February 1988 (age 38)
- Place of birth: Ashford, South Australia
- Height: 1.60 m (5 ft 3 in)
- Position: Striker

Youth career
- West Adelaide

Senior career*
Years	Team	Apps	(Gls)
- Adelaide City
2002–2008	Adelaide Sensation		
2008–2009	Adelaide United	9	(3)
2010–2011	Adelaide United	9	(0)
2011–2012	Sydney FC	0	(0)

International career^{‡}
2007–08	Australia	9	(5)
- * Club domestic league appearances and goals as of 2 October 2017 ‡ National team caps and goals as of 3 July 2011

Victoria Balomenos (born 14 February 1988 in Ashford, South Australia) is an Australian soccer player who played for Australian W-League teams Adelaide United and Sydney FC. Balomenos played nine times for the Australia women's national soccer team.

== Club career ==
=== Adelaide United ===
Balomenos sat out the second season of the W-League due to a knee re-construction. She re-signed with Adelaide United the following season, and on 7 November 2010 she returned to W-League football against Newcastle Jets.

== International career ==
Balomenos played nine matches for the Australian national team, the Matildas, in 2007 and 2008.

== Honours ==
=== International ===
Australia

- AFF Women's Championship: 2008

== See also ==
- List of Australia women's international soccer players
