= Angela Fimmano =

Australian football player

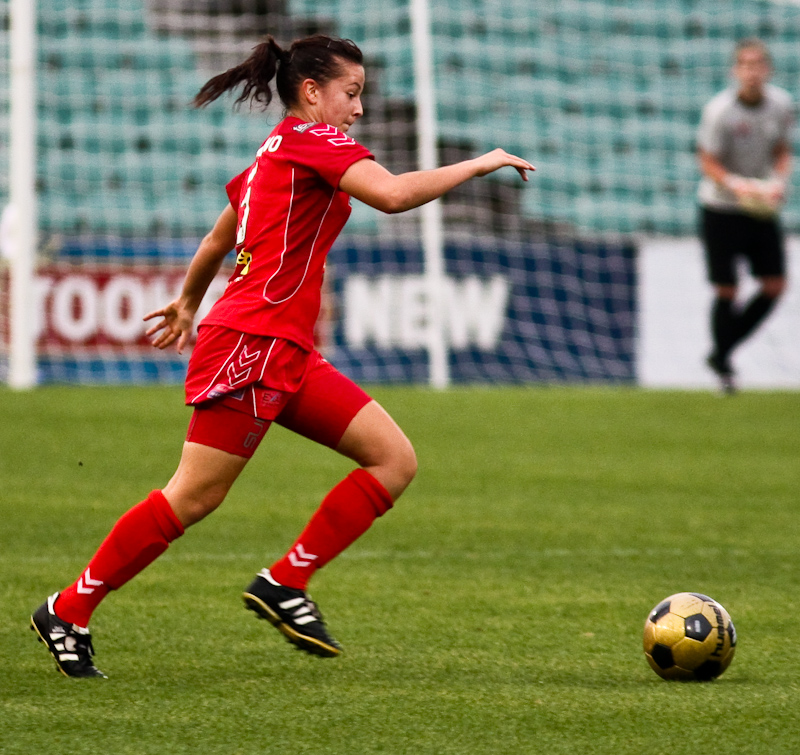
- Fimmano playing for Adelaide United in 2008

Personal information
- Full name: Angela Fimmano
- Date of birth: 22 April 1992 (age 34)
- Place of birth: Adelaide, Australia
- Height: 1.61 m (5 ft 3 in)
- Position: Midfielder

Youth career
- Salisbury Villa
- Metro Stars
- SASI

Senior career*
Years	Team	Apps	(Gls)
2008–2012	Adelaide United	24	(0)
- * Club domestic league appearances and goals as of 3 October 2017

Angela Fimmano (born 22 April 1992) is an Australian soccer player who played for Australian W-League team Adelaide United.

== Personal life ==
She is of Italian descent on her father's side. She was influenced by her brother to take up a career in football and comes from a sporting family; two of her uncles and her grandfather were all footballers themselves. In 2004, Fimmano, and then-future A-League player Terry Antonis, won a Seven Network competition where they travelled to Spain to receive coaching from David Beckham. In 2007, Fimmano received a South Australian Sports Institute (SASI) soccer scholarship. Fimmano was the Adelaide United face of the W-League's "Football with Style" advertising campaign ahead of the 2009 W-League season.
