= Racheal Quigley =

Australian soccer player

Personal information
- Full name: Racheal Nicole Quigley
- Date of birth: 16 January 1991 (age 35)
- Place of birth: Adelaide, South Australia, Australia
- Height: 1.65 m (5 ft 5 in)
- Position: Striker

Team information
- Current team: Stoke City

Senior career*
Years	Team	Apps	(Gls)
- Ingle Farm Junior Soccer Club
- Para Hills Knights
- Fulham United
2008–2013	Adelaide United	47	(11)
2013	Kansas City Shock	10	(4)
2013–2014	Adelaide United	11	(1)
2014–2015	Boroondara Eagles	16	(12)
2014–2015	Melbourne Victory	11	(8)
2015	Bulleen Lions	2	(1)
2015	Melbourne City	1	(0)
2016	Hwacheon KSPO	24	(13)
2016–2017	Adelaide United	8	(5)
2018	Metro United	22	(15)
2020	Salisbury Inter	10	(6)
2022–2024	West Adelaide	19	(29)
2024–2026	Wolverhampton Wanderers	0+	(0+)
2026–	Stoke City	0	(0)
- * Club domestic league appearances and goals as of 14:29, 31 July 2026 (UTC)

Racheal Nicole Quigley (born 16 January 1991) is an Australian soccer player who plays as a forward for National League North Premier Division club Stoke City.

== Club career ==
=== Adelaide United ===
After an impressive second season with Adelaide which saw Quigley score 5 goals in 10 games she was named Adelaide United's 2009–10 W-League Most Valuable Player.

Quigley scored the goal of the year in the 2011–2012 season of the Australian W-League with an over head scissor kick.

=== Kansas City Shock ===
Quigley was an inaugural player for the 2013 season of Kansas City Shock in the WPSL.

=== Boroondara Eagles ===
Quigley joined Boroondara Eagles in the Victorian Women's Premier League for the 2014 winter season alongside teammate Alexandra Gummer. She made her debut in the first round of the season, drawing with Bundoora United 0–0. She scored her debut goal in a 4–2 loss to South Melbourne and a week later scored a hat-trick to give Boroondara Eagles their first win of the season, defeating Ashburton 4–1.

=== Melbourne Victory ===
Quigley joined Melbourne Victory ahead of the 2014 season.

=== Bulleen Lions ===
In March 2015, Quigley joined Bulleen Lions in the Victorian Women's Premier League. They were runners-up in the women's statewide knockout cup, with Quigley scoring in the 5–3 loss to Boroondara Eagles in the final.

=== Melbourne City ===
Quigley made a guest appearance for Melbourne City on 25 October 2015, helping Melbourne City beat Melbourne Victory 2–1 in the Melbourne Derby.

=== Hwacheon KSPO ===
In February 2016, Quigley joined Hwacheon KSPO in the South Korean WK League after an agent saw football footage of her on YouTube. In her debut game she started on the bench and came on in the second half to score the winning goal, giving Hwacheon KSPO a 2–1 victory against Suwon FMC.

=== Return to Adelaide United ===
On 20 September 2016, Quigley confirmed during an interview with The Women's Game that she will be returning to Australia to play for Adelaide United in the 2016–17 season.

=== Wolverhampton Wanderers ===
On 25 September 2024, Quigley joined English FA Women's National League North team Wolverhampton Wanderers.

=== Stoke City ===
On 24 July 2026, Quigley was announced at Stoke City.
