= Marijana Randall =

Australian rules footballer

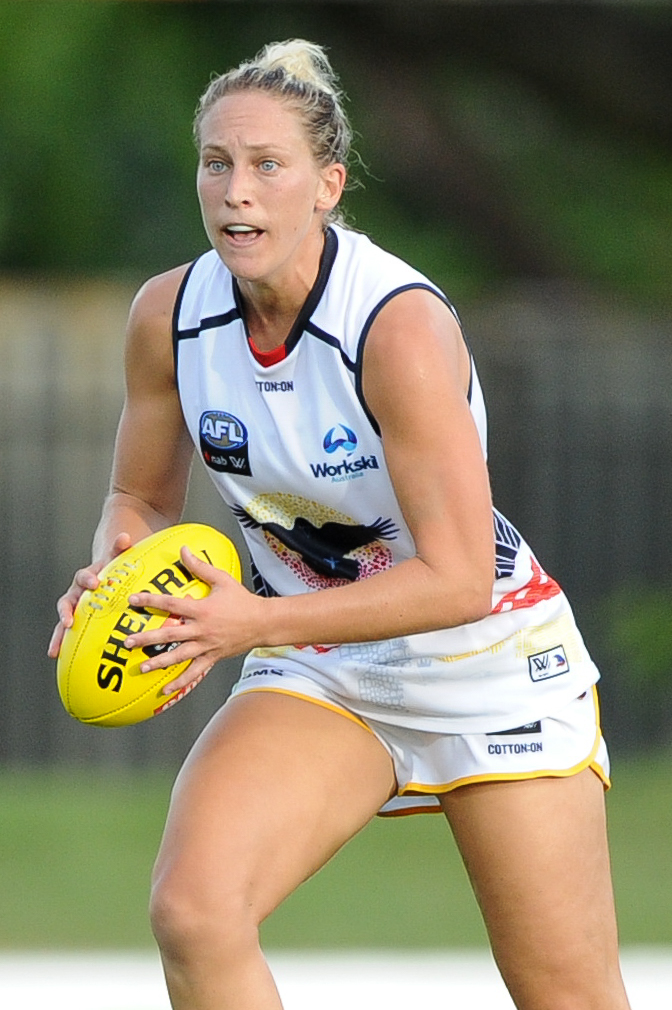
- Randall playing for Adelaide in 2018
- Born: 15 March 1989 (age 37); Adelaide, Australia
- Height: 175 cm (5 ft 9 in)
Australian rules football career
Personal information
- Original team: Norwood Football Club (SANWFL)
- Draft: No. 32, 2017 AFL Women's draft
- Debut: Round 3, 2018, Adelaide vs. Western Bulldogs, at Norwood Oval
- Position: Utility
Playing career^{1}
Years	Club	Games (Goals)
2018–2022 (S7)	Adelaide	50 (2)
- ^{1} Playing statistics correct to the end of 2022 season 7.
Career highlights
- 2× AFL Women's premiership player: 2019, 2022 (S6)
Association football career
- Position: Striker
Senior career*
Years	Team	Apps	(Gls)
- Fulham United
2009–2012	Adelaide United	15	(3)
2012	Gustafs GoIF	19	(6)
2012–2013	Adelaide United	10	(0)
2013–2015	Box Hill United		
2015–2016	Adelaide United	7	(0)
- * Club domestic league appearances and goals as of 13 January 2018

Marijana Randall (née Rajčić, born 15 March 1989) is a retired soccer and Australian rules football player. She played soccer professionally for Adelaide United in the W-League and Australian rules football for Adelaide Football Club in the AFL Women's (AFLW). Randall is currently an assistant coach at the Adelaide Crows.

== Soccer career ==
Prior to taking up Australian rules football, Randall had previously played soccer with Adelaide United in the Australian W-League. Prior to that she had played fully professionally for Gustafs GoIF in the Elitettan for the 2012 season, and played for Box Hill United in the Victorian Women's Premier League when she returned to soccer after knee surgery. She considers captaining Adelaide United in 2015 the best achievement in her soccer career.

== AFL Women's ==
Randall was drafted by Adelaide Football Club with their fourth selection and 32nd overall in the 2017 AFL Women's draft after just one season with Norwood Football Club in the South Australian National Football League's Statewide Super Women's League. She previously took up the sport on the advice of a friend and in doing so followed the example of fellow dual-code players Brianna Davey, Ellie Brush and Jenna McCormick. Randall made her league debut in round 3 of the 2018 season in a seven-point win over the Western Bulldogs at Norwood Oval. In January 2023, Randall announced her retirement.

== Personal life ==
In 2020, Randall competed on The Amazing Race Australia 5 with Chelsea Randall as a "stowaway team". In post-show interviews, the two revealed that they had started dating before filming began. The pair announced their engagement on 5 March 2023 and the birth of their son on 29 October 2023. The couple were married in March 2025, with Marijana changing her family name from Rajčić to Randall.

Randall is of Croatian descent.
