= Donna Cockayne =

Australian football player

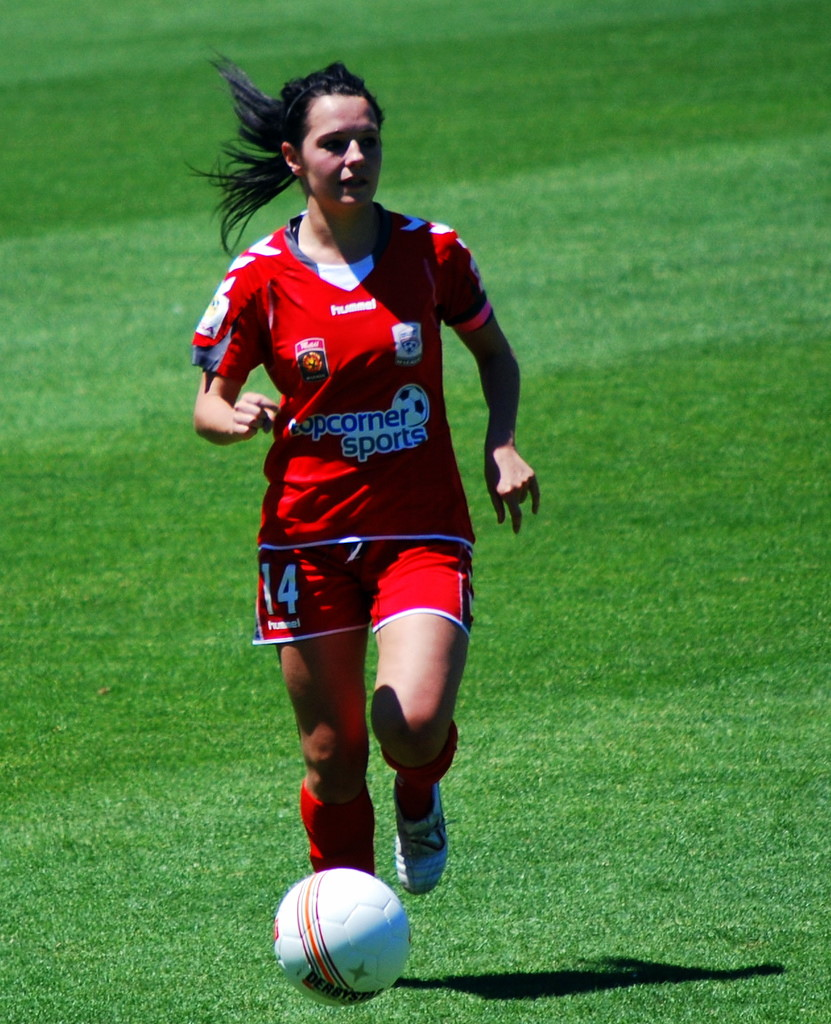

Personal information
- Full name: Donna Cockayne
- Date of birth: 26 March 1989 (age 37)
- Place of birth: Adelaide, Australia
- Height: 1.65 m (5 ft 5 in)
- Position: Midfielder

Senior career*
Years	Team	Apps	(Gls)
2004–	Metro United WFC		
2007–2008	SASI		
2006–2007	Florida Premier (USA)		
2008–2012	Adelaide United	36	(1)
- * Club domestic league appearances and goals as of 2 October 2017

Donna Cockayne (born 26 March 1989) is an Australian football (soccer) player who last played for Australian W-League team Adelaide United. She worked as a nurse alongside her football career.
