= Adelaide United FC (women) =

Australian women's soccer team

Adelaide United Women
- Full name: Adelaide United Football Club
- Nickname: The Reds
- Founded: 2008; 18 years ago
- Ground: Marden Sports Complex, Adelaide
- Capacity: 6,000
- Chairman: Ned Morris
- Head Coach: Theo Tsiounis
- League: A-League Women
- 2025–26: 5th of 11
- Website: http://adelaideunited.com.au/
Home colours	Away colours

Adelaide United Football Club is an Australian women's soccer team based in Adelaide, South Australia. Founded in 2008, it is the affiliated women's team of Adelaide United. The team competes in the country's premier women's soccer competition, the A-League Women.

== History ==
=== Establishment ===
Adelaide United's women's team was formed in 2008 with the inception of the W-League, becoming one of the founding eight teams. The inaugural set up saw North Eastern MetroStars coach Michael Barnett take charge with ex-Adelaide United player Richie Alagich taking up the assistant coach role and Matildas stalwart Dianne Alagich named as captain.

=== 2008–2011 ===
Adelaide's first game was on 25 October 2008 against Queensland Roar at the Queensland Sport and Athletics Centre, which ended in a 4–1 loss with Sharon Black getting the consolation goal. The first win came in Round 2 against the Newcastle Jets at Hindmarsh Stadium, a hard-fought 3–2 win thanks to a hat-trick from Sandra Scalzi. The Reds followed this up with another 3–2 win over Sydney FC before failing to win any of their next seven league games, finishing last in the eight-team competition in their inaugural season.

After a disappointing inaugural season drastic changes were made to the playing staff including the retirement of experienced campaigners Sharon Black and Dianne Alagich to create a youthful team for the 2009 season. Despite the new-look squad, Adelaide continued to struggle in the league, failing to win any of the first 5 games, which included a record-equalling defeat against Sydney FC on 1 November 2009. The first goal of the 2009 season was scored by Tenneille Boaler against Newcastle Jets in the round 6 clash at the Wanderers Oval. The game ended in a 3 – 3 draw, handing Adelaide its second point of the year. Adelaide failed to win a single game in their second season, but thanks to an unlikely 2 – 2 draw with powerhouse team Brisbane Roar, they finished the season in 7th place, their best finish to date. Most Valuable player for 2009 season Racheal Quigley.

The 2010–11 season was even worse for Reds as they lost all ten of their W-League matches. They only scored four goals and finished with a disappointing −32 goal differential; they tied their worst defeat with a −1 loss to Newcastle in round nine. Coach Michael Barnett was let go at the end of the disappointing season, and was replaced by David Edmondson.

Adelaide continued to struggle through most of the 2011–12 season as they opened the campaign with six more losses, scoring four goals during that time while letting twenty-one in. This was better pace than the previous season, though, and the Reds showed significant improvement in on-field play versus 2010–2011, cited as being "unlucky" to not come away with at least a point on multiple occasions. They finally snapped their winless and losing streaks, at 34 and 18 games respectively, with a 1–0 defeat of the Perth Glory in round eight, taking them off the bottom of the table for the first time since November 2009.

Following Adelaide United taking control of the women's team, their first move was signing Mark Jones as the head coach.

=== 2021–2022 ===
Adelaide made the finals for the first time in season 21–22, finishing 3rd with 9 wins and 5 losses from their 14 games. They defeated Brisbane 8–2 in Brisbane in Round 11. Fiona Worts won the Golden Boot with 13 goals and was the only player that year to score two hat-tricks. She also won the Julie Dolan medal for the best player in the league, and Adrian Stenta won the Coach of the Year Award. Unfortunately Adelaide’s first final resulted in a 2–1 defeat to Melbourne Victory.

=== 2024–2025 ===
Adelaide made the finals for the second time and won its first ever finals game in 24–25. It again finished the regular season in 3rd with 14 wins and 3 draws from its 23 games. At Cooper’s stadium in front of 3,143 fans it defeated Western United 1–0, thanks to a goal from Matilda McNamara. In a home and away Semi Final it lost to Melbourne Victory 6–2 on aggregate. Fiona Worts was Adelaide’s top scorer with 11 and 3 players finished inside the League’s top ten scorers. Adrian Stenta won his second Coach of the Year Ward and Claudia Jenkins won the Save of the Year Award.

To celebrate International Women's Day on 8 March 2025, the women's team played on the evening prime time 7:15 p.m. slot for the first time at Hindmarsh Stadium, while the men's team played their match earlier on the same day. This was the highest attended game for the entire A League Wome's season, with 8,852 spectators seeing Adelaide defeat eventual premiers Central Coast 1–0.

== Stadium ==
Adelaide United WFC used to play their home games at Hindmarsh Stadium where they sometimes play a curtain-raiser to A-League games. As of the 2017/18 season, they play their home games at Marden Sports Complex. In the 2016/17 season, Hindmarsh Stadium was questioned about having portable change rooms for the women's team when there is a double header with the A-League side. This resulted in Adelaide WFC having no matches scheduled for Hindmarsh Stadium during the next season.

== Players ==
=== First-team squad ===
As of 22 September 2026

Note: Flags indicate national team as defined under FIFA eligibility rules; some limited exceptions apply. Players may hold more than one non-FIFA nationality.

No.	Pos.	Nation	Player
1	GK	AUS	Ilona Melegh
2	DF	AUS	Emily Hodgson
3	DF	AUS	Claudia Cicco
4	DF	AUS	Holly Murray
5	DF	AUS	India Breier (scholarship)
6	MF	AUS	Melissa Taranto
7	FW	AUS	Emilia Makris
8	MF	AUS	Paige Zois
9	MF	AUS	Kiera Meyers
10	FW	AUS	Chelsie Dawber
11	FW	USA	Tessa Salvestrin

No.	Pos.	Nation	Player
12	FW	AUS	Carina Rossi
14	MF	AUS	Maeve Nicholas (scholarship)
15	MF	AUS	Adriana Taranto (captain)
16	DF	USA	Bella Yakel
18	GK	AUS	Amelie Millar
21	GK	NZL	Claudia Jenkins
23	DF	JAM	Tianna Harris
25	FW	AUS	Lara Gooch
27	MF	AUS	Sian Dewey
99	GK	AUS	Mia Trimboli (youth development)

=== Former players ===
For notable current and former players, see Category:Adelaide United FC (women) players.

== Managers ==
=== Current technical staff ===
Position	Name
Head coach	Theo Tsiounis
Assistant coach	Maruschka Waldus
Assistant coach	Tiarn Powell
Goalkeeper coach	Rian Del Nido

=== Manager history ===
As of 24 January 2021

Name	From	To	Games	Won	Drawn	Lost	Ref.
Michael Barnett	1 July 2008	30 June 2011	30	2	4	24	
(England) David Edmondson	31 August 2011	13 January 2013	22	3	0	19	
Ross Aloisi	22 August 2013	28 July 2015	24	6	5	13	
Jamie Harnwell	30 July 2015	30 June 2016	12	3	4	5	
Mark Jones	7 September 2016	22 September 2016	0	0	0	0	
Hussein Skenderovic	5 October 2016	30 June 2017	12	3	5	4	
Ivan Karlović	1 July 2017	4 August 2020	24	8	4	12	
Adrian Stenta	4 August 2020	30 June 2025	27	16	1	10	
Theo Tsiounis	17 July 2025		0	0	0	0	

== Colours and badge ==
Since its inception Adelaide United has played in a predominantly all-red home kit. For the inaugural season the away kit consisted of a white top and socks and red shorts; during the 2009 season the away kit changed to a black top with red shorts and socks. The badge is heavily based on the Adelaide United men's team, with the logo being encased in a W-League shield; as is the case with every other W-League club.

== Records ==
Chart of yearly table positions for Adelaide United in A-League Women

Season	League/Division	League Position	Play-offs	Top scorers	Head coach
2008–09	W-League	8th of 8	–	Victoria Balomenos, Sandra Scalzi (4)	Michael Barnett
2009	W-League	7th of 8	–	Racheal Quigley (5)	Michael Barnett
2010–11	W-League	7th of 7	–	multiple players scoring 1 goal	Michael Barnett
2011–12	W-League	7th of 7	–	Marijana Rajcic (3)	David Edmondson
2012–13	W-League	8th of 8	–	Racheal Quigley, (New Zealand) Sarah McLaughlin (4)	David Edmondson
2013–14	W-League	6th of 8	–	(England) Kristy Moore (3)	Ross Aloisi
2014	W-League	7th of 8	–	(England) Kristy Moore (3)	Ross Aloisi
2015–16	W-League	5th of 9	–	Rosie Sutton, (United States) Abby Dahlkemper (5)	Jamie Harnwell
2016–17	W-League	6th of 9	–	Adriana Jones (9)	Hussein Skenderovic
2017–18	W-League	9th of 9	–	(United States) Makenzy Doniak (7)	Ivan Karlović
2018–19	W-League	6th of 9	–	(United States) Veronica Latsko (9)	Ivan Karlović
2019–20	W-League	8th of 9	–	(United States) Mallory Weber (4)	Ivan Karlović
2020–21	W-League	5th of 9	–	Chelsie Dawber (5)	Adrian Stenta
2021–22	A-League Women	3rd of 10	SF	(England) Fiona Worts (13)	Adrian Stenta

Last updated 30 April 2024

- Record Victory: 10 – 2 vs Western Sydney Wanderers, 14 January 2017
- Record Defeat: 0 – 8 vs Newcastle Jets, 29 March 2024
- Without Winning: 34 matches, 15 November 2008 – 10 December 2011
- All-time Leading Goal Scorer: Racheal Quigley, 7 goals.
- All-time Leading Appearances: Donna Cockayne, 27 Appearances.

=== League record by opponent ===
Club	Pld	W	D	L	GF	GA	Win %	First	Last	Notes
Club	Total						Win %	First	Last	Notes
Brisbane Roar †	29	8	4	17	42	60	27.59	2008–09	2025–26	(Note: Includes record against Queensland Roar)
Canberra United †	31	8	6	17	41	71	25.81	2008–09	2025–26	
Central Coast Mariners †	9	3	0	6	4	21	33.33	2008–09	2025–26	
Melbourne City †	16	2	5	9	13	29	12.50	2015–16	2025–26	
Melbourne Victory †	33	6	3	24	32	80	18.18	2008–09	2025–26	
Newcastle Jets †	32	11	7	14	48	69	34.38	2008–09	2025–26	
Perth Glory †	31	12	3	16	41	50	38.71	2008–09	2025–26	
Sydney FC †	29	6	2	21	28	72	20.69	2008–09	2025–26	
Wellington Phoenix †	11	6	0	5	15	17	54.55	2021–22	2025–26	
Western Sydney Wanderers †	23	12	5	6	49	35	52.17	2012–13	2025–26	
Western United	6	2	1	3	7	8	33.33	2022–23	2024–25	

- The table includes results of matches played by Adelaide United in the A-League Women. Matches played at a neutral venue during Unite Round are excluded from the home and away records.
- The table includes results from the A-League Women finals series.
- The name used for each opponent is the name they had when Adelaide United most recently played a league match against them. Results against each opponent include results against that club under any former name. For example, results against Brisbane Roar include matches played against Queensland Roar (2008–2009).
- The columns headed "First" and "Last" contain the first and most recent seasons in which Adelaide United played league matches against each opponent.
- Pld = matches played; W = matches won; D = matches drawn; L = matches lost; Win % = percentage of total matches won
- † Clubs with this background and symbol in the "Opponent" column are Adelaide United's divisional rivals in the current season.
- ‡ Clubs with this background and symbol in the "Opponent" column are defunct.

== See also ==
- List of top-division football clubs in AFC countries
- Women's soccer in Australia
- W-League (Australia) all-time records
- Australia women's national soccer team
