= 2009 Sydney FC (women) season =

Sydney FC (W-League)
2009 season
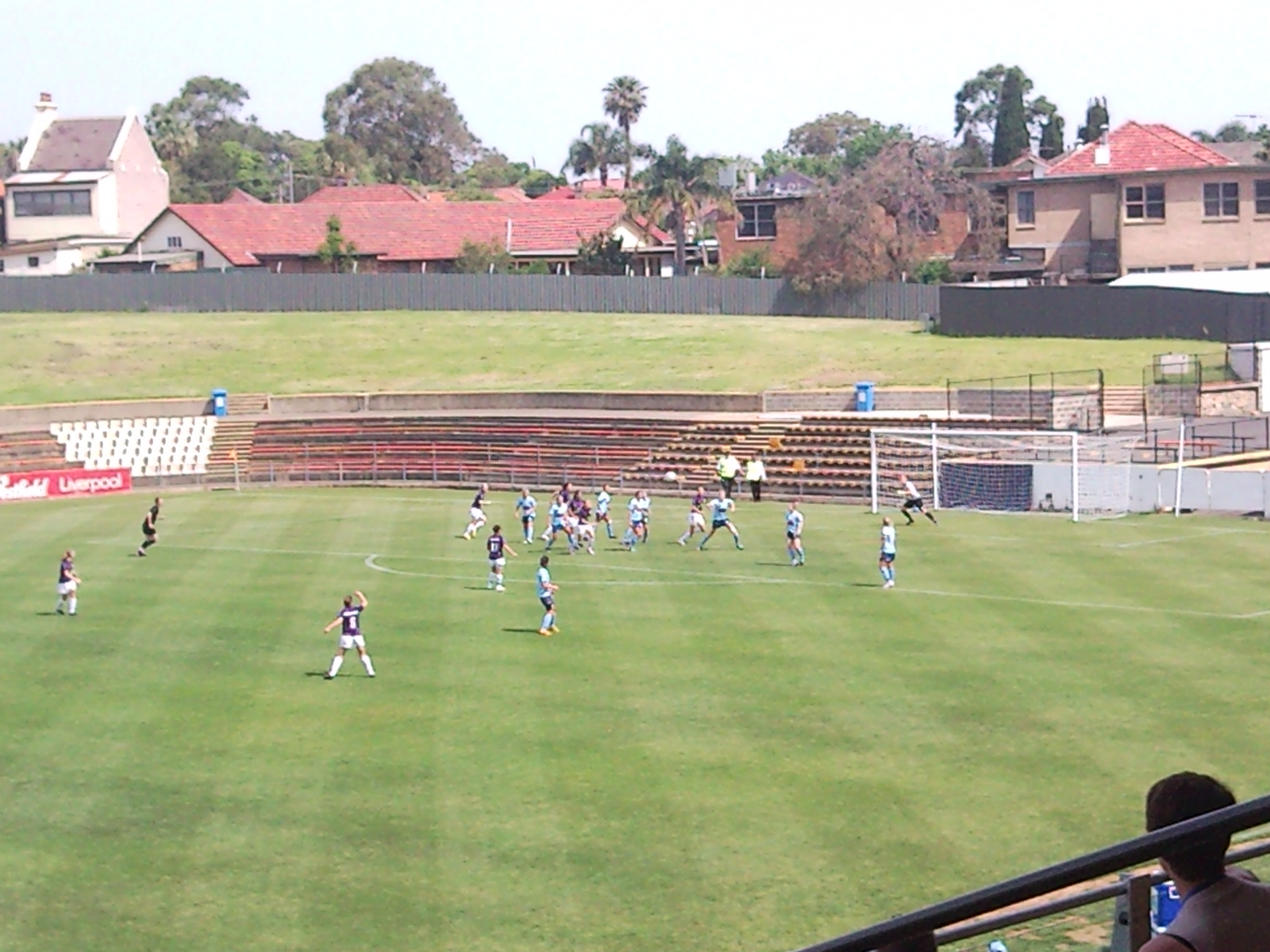
- Sydney FC playing against Perth Glory at Leichhardt Oval.
- Head Coach: Alen Stajcic
- W-League: 1st
- W-League Finals: Winners
- Top goalscorer: League: Leena Khamis (7); All: Leena Khamis; Sarah Walsh (8 each)
- Biggest win: 6–0 vs. Adelaide United (H) (1 November 2009); W-League
- Biggest defeat: 1–3 vs. Central Coast Mariners (H) (5 October 2009); W-League
Home colours	Away colours

The 2009 season was Sydney Football Club (W-League)'s second season, in the W-League. Sydney FC finished 1st in their W-League season, finishing as winners in the Grand Final.

== Players ==
Note: Flags indicate national team as defined under FIFA eligibility rules; some limited exceptions apply. Players may hold more than one non-FIFA nationality.

No.	Pos.	Nation	Player
1	GK	AUS	Nikola Dieter
2	DF	AUS	Teigan Allen
3	DF	AUS	Danielle Brogan
4	DF	AUS	Alesha Clifford
5	DF	AUS	Lisa Gilbert
6	MF	AUS	Servet Uzunlar
7	MF	AUS	Heather Garriock (Captain)
8	MF	DEN	Julie Rydahl
9	FW	AUS	Sarah Walsh
10	MF	AUS	Kylie Ledbrook

No.	Pos.	Nation	Player
11	MF	DEN	Cathrine Paaske
12	FW	AUS	Michelle Carney
13	FW	AUS	Catherine Cannuli
14	MF	AUS	Nicola Bolger
15	FW	AUS	Kyah Simon
16	MF	AUS	Linda O'Neill
17	MF	AUS	Danielle Small
18	MF	AUS	Brittany Whitfield
19	FW	AUS	Leena Khamis
20	GK	AUS	Karla Monforte

== Transfers ==
Player movement retrieved from recent articles.

=== Transfers in ===
- Teigan Allen
- Julie Rydahl (Linköpings FC)
- Cathrine Paaske (Linköpings FC)
- Michelle Carney
- Catherine Cannuli
- Kyah Simon (Central Coast Mariners)
- Brittany Whitfield
- Karla Monforte

=== Transfers out ===
- Jo Burgess (Brisbane Roar)
- Rachel Cooper (Central Coast Mariners)
- Jessica Seaman (Central Coast Mariners)
- Samantha Spackman (Central Coast Mariners)
- Kelly Golebiowski (Central Coast Mariners)
- Michelle Heyman (Central Coast Mariners)
- Carlie Ikonumou (Newcastle Jets)
- Loren Mahoney (Newcastle Jets)
- Maggie Elhusseini
- Jordan Marsh
- Leah Blayney

== Competitions ==
=== Overall record ===
Competition	First match	Last match	Starting round	Final position	Record							
Competition	First match	Last match	Starting round	Final position	Pld	W	D	L	GF	GA	GD	Win %
W-League	5 October 2009	5 December 2009	Matchday 1	1st	10	7	2	1	25	10	+15	70.00
W-League Finals	12 December 2009	19 December 2009	Semi-finals	Winners	2	2	0	0	6	2	+4	100.00
Total					12	9	2	1	31	12	+19	75.00

Source: Competitions

=== W-League ===
==== League table ====
Pos	Team	Pld	W	D	L	GF	GA	GD	Pts	Qualification
1	Sydney FC (C)	10	7	2	1	25	10	+15	23	Qualification to Finals series
2	Central Coast Mariners	10	7	1	2	24	7	+17	22	Qualification to Finals series
3	Brisbane Roar	10	6	3	1	24	7	+17	21	Qualification to Finals series
4	Canberra United	10	4	2	4	17	12	+5	14	Qualification to Finals series
5	Melbourne Victory	10	4	2	4	9	10	−1	14	
6	Perth Glory	10	4	1	5	11	22	−11	13	
7	Adelaide United	10	0	3	7	7	31	−24	3	
8	Newcastle Jets	10	0	2	8	7	25	−18	2	

Source: au.soccerway.com
Rules for classification: 1) points; 2) goal difference; 3) number of goals scored.
(C) Champions

==== Results summary ====
Overall								Home						Away					
Pld	W	D	L	GF	GA	GD	Pts	W	D	L	GF	GA	GD	W	D	L	GF	GA	GD
10	7	2	1	25	10	+15	23	3	1	1	14	6	+8	4	1	0	11	4	+7

Source: worldfootball.net

==== Results by round ====
Round	1	2	3	4	5	6	7	8	9	10
Ground	H	A	A	H	H	A	H	H	A	A
Result	L	W	W	D	W	D	W	W	W	W
Position	6	4	4	3	3	3	3	3	2	1
Points	0	3	6	7	10	11	14	17	20	23

Source: worldfootball.net
A = Away; H = Home; W = Win; D = Draw; L = Loss

==== Matches ====
The league fixtures were announced on 27 July 2009.

Win Draw Loss

5 October 2009 1	Sydney FC	1–3	Central Coast Mariners	Sydney
12:15 AEDT	Walsh 46'	Report	Heyman 12', 63'; Golebiowski 90+1'	Stadium: Sydney Football Stadium; Referee: Peta McCallum

10 October 2009 2	Canberra United	1–2	Sydney FC	Canberra
17:00 AEDT	Brush 89'	Report	Walsh 19'; Paaske 83'	Stadium: McKellar Park; Attendance: 953; Referee: Peta McCallum

17 October 2009 3	Newcastle Jets	0–1	Sydney FC	Newcastle
15:00 AEDT		Report	Khamis 5'	Stadium: EnergyAustralia Stadium; Attendance: 470; Referee: Kirralee Gardener

25 October 2009 4	Sydney FC	1–1	Brisbane Roar	Sydney
14:15 AEDT	Paaske 34'	Report	Simon 46' (o.g.)	Stadium: Sydney Football Stadium; Referee: Rebecca Durcau

1 November 2009 5	Sydney FC	6–0	Adelaide United	Sydney
14:15 AEDT	Clifford 5'; Walsh 22', 29'; Khamis 59'; Carney 73'; Cannulli 83'	Report		Stadium: Sydney Football Stadium; Referee: Kirralee Gardener

7 November 2009 6	Melbourne Victory	1–1	Sydney FC	Shepparton
19:00 AEDT	Sitch 62'	Report	Ruyter-Hooley 90+5'	Stadium: Deakin Reserve; Referee: Catherine Hofmann

14 November 2009 7	Sydney FC	1–0	Newcastle Jets	Sydney
16:00 AEDT	Khamis 24'	Report		Stadium: Seymour Shaw Park; Referee: Peta McCallum

21 November 2009 8	Sydney FC	5–2	Perth Glory	Sydney
15:00 AEDT	Rydahl 12' (pen.); Khamis 14', 20'; Paaske 39'; Walsh 84'	Report	Kerr 7'; De Vanna 63'	Stadium: Leichhardt Oval; Referee: Prue Donohoe

28 November 2009 9	Adelaide United	2–6	Sydney FC	Adelaide
15:30 ACDT	Quigley 82', 90+2'	Report	Walsh 8'; Garriock 10', 74'; Khamis 26'; Whitfield 90+1'; Simon 90+3'	Stadium: Hindmarsh Stadium; Referee: Lee Corey

5 December 2009 10	Central Coast Mariners	0–1	Sydney FC	Gosford
15:00 AEDT		Report	Khamis 35'	Stadium: Bluetongue Stadium; Attendance: 800; Referee: Kate Jacewicz

==== Finals series ====
12 December 2009 Semi-finals	Sydney FC	3–0	Canberra United	Sydney
15:00 AEDT	Walsh 45'; Khamis 60'; Garriock 84'	Report		Stadium: Shark Park; Attendance: 741; Referee: Casey Reibelt

19 December 2009 Grand Final	Sydney FC	3–2	Brisbane Roar	Sydney
15:00 AEDT	O'Neill 66'; Walsh 73'; Rydahl 78'	Report	Harch 15'; Butt 90+3' (pen.)	Stadium: Shark Park; Attendance: 1,439; Referee: Kate Jacewicz

== Squad statistics ==
Last updated 10 October 2009

No.	Pos.	Name	W-League		W-League Finals		Total		Discipline	
No.	Pos.	Name	Apps	Goals	Apps	Goals	Apps	Goals	Yellow card	Red card
1	GK	(Australia) Nikola Dieter	2	0	0	0	2	0	0	0
2	DF	(Australia) Teigan Allen	1	0	0	0	1	0	0	0
3	DF	(Australia) Danielle Brogan	2	0	0	0	2	0	0	0
4	DF	(Australia) Alesha Clifford	1	0	0	0	1	0	0	0
5	DF	(Australia) Lisa Gilbert	2	0	0	0	2	0	0	0
6	MF	(Australia) Servet Uzunlar	2	0	0	0	2	0	0	0
7	MF	(Australia) Heather Garriock	2	0	0	0	2	0	1	0
8	FW	(Denmark) Julie Rydahl	2	0	0	0	2	0	0	0
9	FW	(Australia) Sarah Walsh	2	2	0	0	2	2	0	0
10	MF	(Australia) Kylie Ledbrook	2	0	0	0	2	0	1	0
11	MF	(Denmark) Cathrine Paaske	2	1	0	0	2	1	0	0
12	FW	(Australia) Michelle Carney	1	0	0	0	1	0	0	0
13	FW	(Australia) Catherine Cannuli	2	0	0	0	2	0	0	0
14	MF	(Australia) Nicola Bolger	1	0	0	0	1	0	0	0
15	FW	(Australia) Kyah Simon	2	0	0	0	2	0	0	0
16	MF	(Australia) Linda O'Neill	0	0	0	0	0	0	0	0
17	FW	(Australia) Danielle Small	0	0	0	0	0	0	0	0
18	MF	(Australia) Brittany Whitfield	0	0	0	0	0	0	0	0
19	FW	(Australia) Leena Khamis	2	0	0	0	2	0	0	0
20	GK	(Australia) Karla Monforte	0	0	0	0	0	0	0	0
