= 2011–12 Sydney FC (women) season =

Sydney FC (W-League)
2011–12 season
- Chairman: Paul Ramsay
- Head Coach: Alen Stajcic
- Stadium: Leichhardt Oval
- W-League: 3rd
- W-League Finals: Semi-finals
- Top goalscorer: League: Kylie Ledbrook; Renee Rollason (5 each); All: Renee Rollason (6)
- Biggest win: 11–0 vs. Perth Glory (H) (3 December 2011); W-League
- Biggest defeat: 0–1 vs. Canberra United (H) (5 November 2011); W-League; 1–2 vs. Newcastle Jets (A) (31 December 2011); W-League; 0–1 vs. Brisbane Roar (A) (14 January 2012); W-League
Home colours	Away colours

The 2011–12 season was Sydney Football Club's fourth season, in the W-League. Sydney FC finished 3rd in their W-League season, finishing in the semi-finals.

== Players ==
Note: Flags indicate national team as defined under FIFA eligibility rules; some limited exceptions apply. Players may hold more than one non-FIFA nationality.

No.	Pos.	Nation	Player
1	GK	USA	Alli Lipsher
2	MF	AUS	Teresa Polias
3	DF	AUS	Danielle Brogan
4	MF	AUS	Renee Rollason
5	DF	CMR	Estelle Johnson
6	MF	AUS	Servet Uzunlar
7	MF	AUS	Heather Garriock
8	DF	AUS	Caitlin Foord
9	FW	AUS	Sarah Walsh
10	MF	AUS	Kylie Ledbrook
11	MF	AUS	Victoria Balomenos

No.	Pos.	Nation	Player
12	DF	AUS	Teigen Allen
13	FW	AUS	Brittany Whitfield
14	MF	AUS	Rachael Soutar
15	DF	AUS	Thea Slatyer
16	MF	AUS	Alisha Bass
17	FW	AUS	Kyah Simon
19	FW	AUS	Leena Khamis
20	GK	AUS	Monique Jackson
21	FW	AUS	Chloe Logarzo
30	GK	AUS	Sham Khamis

== Transfers ==
=== Transfers in ===
No.	Position	Name	From	Type/fee	Date	Ref.
1	GK	(United States) Alli Lipsher	(United States) Atlanta Beat	Free transfer	17 October 2011	
5	DF	(Cameroon) Estelle Johnson	(United States) Philadelphia Independence	Free transfer	17 October 2011	
14	MF	Rachael Soutar	(Australia) NSWIS	Free transfer	17 October 2011	
15	DF	Thea Slatyer	Newcastle Jets	Free transfer	17 October 2011	
16	MF	Alisha Bass	(Australia) NSWIS	Free transfer	17 October 2011	
20	GK	Monique Jackson	(Australia) Macarthur Rams	Free transfer	17 October 2011	
11	MF	Victoria Balomenos	Adelaide United	Free transfer	17 October 2011	
18	MF	(United States) Megan Rapinoe	Free agent	Free transfer	18 October 2011	

=== Transfers out ===
No.	Position	Name	To	Type/fee	Date	Ref.
5	DF	Alanna Kennedy	Newcastle Jets	Free transfer	11 October 2011	
14	MF	Nicola Bolger	Newcastle Jets	Free transfer	11 October 2011	
16	MF	Linda O'Neill	Newcastle Jets	Free transfer	11 October 2011	
13	FW	Catherine Cannuli	Brisbane Roar	Free transfer	17 October 2011	
18	MF	(United States) Megan Rapinoe	Free agent	Free transfer	29 October 2011	

== Competitions ==
=== Overall record ===
Competition	First match	Last match	Starting round	Final position	Record							
Competition	First match	Last match	Starting round	Final position	Pld	W	D	L	GF	GA	GD	Win %
W-League	22 October 2011	14 January 2012	Matchday 1	3rd	10	5	2	3	26	8	+18	50.00
W-League Finals	22 January 2012		Semi-finals	Semi-finals	1	0	1	0	1	1	+0	0.00
Total					11	5	3	3	27	9	+18	45.45

Source: Competitions

=== W-League ===
==== League table ====
Pos	Team	Pld	W	D	L	GF	GA	GD	Pts	Qualification
1	Canberra United (C)	10	7	3	0	23	9	+14	24	Qualification to Finals series
2	Brisbane Roar	10	6	3	1	20	11	+9	21	Qualification to Finals series
3	Sydney FC	10	5	2	3	26	8	+18	17	Qualification to Finals series
4	Melbourne Victory	10	5	2	3	21	9	+12	17	Qualification to Finals series
5	Newcastle Jets	10	4	0	6	18	22	−4	12	
6	Perth Glory	10	2	0	8	11	36	−25	6	
7	Adelaide United	10	1	0	9	6	30	−24	3	

Source: au.soccerway.com
Rules for classification: 1) points; 2) goal difference; 3) number of goals scored.
(C) Champions

==== Results summary ====
Overall								Home						Away					
Pld	W	D	L	GF	GA	GD	Pts	W	D	L	GF	GA	GD	W	D	L	GF	GA	GD
10	5	2	3	26	8	+18	17	2	1	2	15	5	+10	3	1	1	11	3	+8

Source: worldfootball.net

==== Results by round ====
Round	1	2	3	4	5	6	7	8	9	10	11	12
Ground	H	H	H	A	B	A	H	A	B	H	A	A
Result	D	W	L	W	B	W	W	D	B	L	W	L
Position	3	2	3	2	3	2	2	2	3	3	3	3
Points	1	4	4	7	7	10	13	14	14	14	17	17

Source: worldfootball.net
A = Away; H = Home; W = Win; D = Draw; L = Loss

==== Matches ====
The league fixtures were announced on 27 September 2011.

Win Draw Loss

22 October 2011 1	Sydney FC	1–1	Brisbane Roar	Sydney
15:00 AEDT	Rollason 26'	Report	Burgess 51'	Stadium: Leichhardt Oval; Referee: Peta McCallum

29 October 2011 2	Sydney FC	2–1	Melbourne Victory	Sydney
15:00 AEDT	Ledbrook 9'; Rapinoe 83'	Report	Taylor 63' (pen.)	Stadium: Leichhardt Oval; Referee: Jacqui Melksham

5 November 2011 3	Sydney FC	0–1	Canberra United	Sydney
15:00 AEDT		Report	Sykes 19'	Stadium: Leichhardt Oval; Referee: Kirralee Andruschak

12 November 2011 4	Newcastle Jets	1–4	Sydney FC	Newcastle
15:00 AEDT	Andrews 86'	Report	Walsh 46'; Slatyer 57'; Foord 64'; Garriock 76'	Stadium: Adamstown Oval; Attendance: 985; Referee: Casey Reibelt

26 November 2011 6	Adelaide United	1–4	Sydney FC	Adelaide
14:30 ACDT	Rajcic 30'	Report	Garriock 38'; Uzunlar 42'; McLaren 76' (o.g.); Foord 78'	Stadium: Hindmarsh Stadium; Referee: Stacey Sasopolous

3 December 2011 7	Sydney FC	11–0	Perth Glory	Sydney
19:00 AEDT	Rollason 24', 42', 50'; Ledbrook 47', 78', 87'; Oxtoby 58' (o.g.); Khamis 59', 60', 75'; Simon 90+3'	Report		Stadium: Leichhardt Oval; Referee: Kirralee Andruschak

10 December 2011 8	Canberra United	0–0	Sydney FC	Canberra
17:00 AEDT		Report		Stadium: Deakin Stadium; Referee: Casey Reibelt

31 December 2011 10	Sydney FC	1–2	Newcastle Jets	Sydney
15:00 AEDT	Rollason 70'	Report	Simon 10'; Bolger 37'	Stadium: Campbelltown Stadium; Referee: Kirralee Andruschak

7 January 2012 11	Perth Glory	0–3	Sydney FC	Perth
16:00 AWST		Report	Oxtoby 6' (o.g.); Simon 22', 45'	Stadium: 6PR Stadium; Referee: David Costello

14 January 2012 12	Brisbane Roar	1–0	Sydney FC	Brisbane
14:00 AEST	Polias 32' (o.g.)	Report		Stadium: Queensland Sport and Athletics Centre; Referee: Kirralee Andruschak

==== Finals series ====
22 January 2012 Semi-finals	Brisbane Roar	1–1 (a.e.t.) (4–3 p)	Sydney FC	Brisbane
14:00 AEST	Gielnik 90+5'	Report	Rollason 18'	Stadium: Queensland Sport and Athletics Centre; Attendance: 1,648; Referee: Casey Reibelt
	Penalties
	Caroll (penalty scored); Butt (penalty scored); Spence (penalty scored); Garcia (penalty missed); Luik (penalty scored)		(penalty scored) Slatyer; (penalty missed) Johnson; (penalty scored) Brogan; (penalty missed) Polias; (penalty scored) Allen

== Statistics ==
=== Appearances and goals ===
Includes all competitions. Players with no appearances not included in the list.

No.	Pos.	Nat.	Name	W-League				Total	
No.	Pos.	Nat.	Name	Regular season		Finals series		Total	
No.	Pos.	Nat.	Name	Apps	Goals	Apps	Goals	Apps	Goals
1	GK	(United States)	Alli Lipsher	9	0	1	0	10	0
2	MF	(Australia)	Teresa Polias	10	0	1	0	11	0
3	DF	(Australia)	Danielle Brogan	9	0	1	0	10	0
4	NF	(Australia)	Renee Rollason	9+1	5	1	1	11	6
5	DF	(Cameroon)	Estelle Johnson	9	0	1	0	10	0
6	MF	(Australia)	Servet Uzunlar	9	1	1	0	10	1
7	MF	(Australia)	Heather Garriock	5+1	2	0	0	6	2
8	DF	(Australia)	Caitlin Friend	4+6	2	0	0	10	2
9	FW	(Australia)	Sarah Walsh	6+3	0	0+1	0	10	0
10	MF	(Australia)	Kylie Ledbrook	10	5	1	0	11	5
12	DF	(Australia)	Teigen Allen	8+2	0	0+1	0	11	0
13	FW	(Australia)	Brittany Whitfield	2+6	0	0+1	0	9	0
14	MF	(Australia)	Rachael Soutar	0+1	0	0	0	1	0
15	DF	(Australia)	Thea Slatyer	8+1	1	1	0	10	1
16	MF	(Australia)	Alisha Bass	0+1	0	0	0	1	0
17	FW	(Australia)	Kyah Simon	3+2	3	1	0	6	3
19	FW	(Australia)	Leena Khamis	6	4	1	0	7	4
20	GK	(Australia)	Monique Jackson	1	0	0	0	1	0
21	FW	(Australia)	Chloe Logarzo	0+2	0	0	0	2	0
Player(s) transferred out but featured this season
18	MF	(United States)	Megan Rapinoe	2	1	0	0	2	1

=== Disciplinary record ===
Includes all competitions. The list is sorted by squad number when total cards are equal. Players with no cards not included in the list.

Rank	No.	Pos.	Nat.	Name	W-League						Total		
Rank	No.	Pos.	Nat.	Name	Regular season			Finals series			Total		
Rank	No.	Pos.	Nat.	Name	Booked	(yellow card) (yellow-red card)	Sent off (straight red)	Booked	(yellow card) (yellow-red card)	Sent off (straight red)	Booked	(yellow card) (yellow-red card)	Sent off (straight red)
1	6	MF	(Australia)	Servet Uzunlar	0	1	0	1	0	0	1	1	0
2	4	MF	(Australia)	Renee Rollason	2	0	0	1	0	0	3	0	0
2	12	DF	(Australia)	Teigen Allen	2	0	0	1	0	0	3	0	0
4	8	DF	(Australia)	Caitlin Foord	2	0	0	0	0	0	2	0	0
4	10	MF	(Australia)	Kylie Ledbrook	2	0	0	0	0	0	2	0	0
6	1	GK	(United States)	Alli Lipsher	1	0	0	0	0	0	1	0	0
6	7	MF	(Australia)	Heather Garriock	1	0	0	0	0	0	1	0	0
6	13	FW	(Australia)	Brittany Whitfield	1	0	0	0	0	0	1	0	0
6	17	FW	(Australia)	Kyah Simon	1	0	0	0	0	0	1	0	0
6	18	MF	(United States)	Megan Rapinoe	1	0	0	0	0	0	1	0	0
6	19	FW	(Australia)	Leena Khamis	1	0	0	0	0	0	1	0	0
Total					14	1	0	3	0	0	17	0	0

=== Clean sheets ===
Includes all competitions. The list is sorted by squad number when total clean sheets are equal. Numbers in parentheses represent games where both goalkeepers participated and both kept a clean sheet; the number in parentheses is awarded to the goalkeeper who was substituted on, whilst a full clean sheet is awarded to the goalkeeper who was on the field at the start of play. Goalkeepers with no clean sheets not included in the list.

Rank	No.	Nat.	Goalkeeper	W-League		Total
Rank	No.	Nat.	Goalkeeper	Regular season	Finals series	Total
1	1	(United States)	Alli Lipsher	3	0	3
