= 2010–11 Sydney FC (women) season =

Sydney FC (W-League)
2010–11 season
- Chairman: Scott Barlow
- Head Coach: Alen Stajcic
- W-League: 1st
- W-League Finals: Runners-up
- Highest home attendance: 1,872 vs. Brisbane Roar (12 February 2011); W-League Grand Final
- Lowest home attendance: 246 vs. Perth Glory (11 December 2010); W-League
- Average home league attendance: 620
- Biggest win: 4–0 vs. Adelaide United (A) (18 December 2010); W-League; 5–1 vs. Perth Glory (A) (9 January 2011); W-League; 5–1 vs. Melbourne Victory (H) (6 February 2011); W-League Finals
- Biggest defeat: 1–2 vs. Newcastle Jets (H) (27 November 2010); W-League; 0–1 vs. Brisbane Roar (H) (1 January 2011); W-League; 1–2 vs. Brisbane Roar (H) (12 February 2011); W-League Grand Final
Home colours	Away colours

The 2010–11 season was Sydney Football Club (W-League)'s third season, in the W-League. Sydney FC finished 1st in their W-League season, finishing as runners-up in the Grand Final.

== Players ==
As of 3 November 2010.

Note: Flags indicate national team as defined under FIFA eligibility rules; some limited exceptions apply. Players may hold more than one non-FIFA nationality.

No.	Pos.	Nation	Player
1	GK	AUS	Dimi Poulos
2	MF	AUS	Teresa Polias
3	DF	AUS	Danielle Brogan
4	DF	AUS	Alesha Clifford
5	DF	AUS	Alanna Kennedy
6	MF	AUS	Servet Uzunlar
7	MF	AUS	Heather Garriock (Captain)
8	MF	AUS	Renee Rollason
9	FW	AUS	Caitlin Foord
10	MF	AUS	Kylie Ledbrook

No.	Pos.	Nation	Player
11	MF	USA	Lydia Vandenbergh
13	FW	AUS	Catherine Cannuli
14	MF	AUS	Nicola Bolger
15	DF	AUS	Teigen Allen
16	MF	AUS	Linda O'Neill
17	FW	AUS	Kyah Simon
18	MF	AUS	Samantha Spackman
19	FW	AUS	Leena Khamis
20	GK	AUS	Erin Herd

== Competitions ==
=== Overall record ===
Competition	First match	Last match	Starting round	Final position	Record							
Competition	First match	Last match	Starting round	Final position	Pld	W	D	L	GF	GA	GD	Win %
W-League	6 November 2010	29 January 2011	Matchday 1	1st	10	8	0	2	29	9	+20	80.00
W-League Finals	6 February 2011	12 February 2011	Semi-finals	Runners-up	2	1	0	1	6	3	+3	50.00
Total					12	9	0	3	35	12	+23	75.00

Source: Competitions

=== W-League ===
==== League table ====
Pos	Team	Pld	W	D	L	GF	GA	GD	Pts	Qualification
1	Sydney FC	10	8	0	2	29	9	+20	24	Qualification to Finals series
2	Brisbane Roar (C)	10	6	3	1	17	7	+10	21	Qualification to Finals series
3	Canberra United	10	5	2	3	16	9	+7	17	Qualification to Finals series
4	Melbourne Victory	10	4	3	3	12	11	+1	15	Qualification to Finals series
5	Perth Glory	10	4	1	5	11	15	−4	13	
6	Newcastle Jets	10	3	1	6	13	15	−2	10	
7	Adelaide United	10	0	0	10	4	36	−32	0	

Source: au.soccerway.com
Rules for classification: 1) points; 2) goal difference; 3) number of goals scored.
(C) Champions

==== Results summary ====
Overall								Home						Away					
Pld	W	D	L	GF	GA	GD	Pts	W	D	L	GF	GA	GD	W	D	L	GF	GA	GD
10	8	0	2	29	9	+20	24	3	0	2	10	4	+6	5	0	0	19	5	+14

Source: worldfootball.net

==== Results by round ====
Round	1	2	3	4	5	6	7	8	9	10	11	12
Ground	A	A	H	H	B	H	A	H	A	B	H	A
Result	W	W	W	L	B	W	W	L	W	B	W	W
Position	2	1	1	1	2	2	2	2	2	2	1	1
Points	3	6	9	9	9	12	15	15	18	18	21	24

Source: worldfootball.net
A = Away; H = Home; W = Win; D = Draw; L = Loss

==== Matches ====
The league fixtures were announced on 20 August 2010.

Win Draw Loss

6 November 2010 1	Brisbane Roar	2–4	Sydney FC	Brisbane
14:00 AEST	Butt 14'; Harch 49'	Report	Garriock 5', 54'; Rollason 33'; Simon 36'	Stadium: Ballymore Stadium; Attendance: 1,093; Referee: Jacqui Melksham

13 November 2010 2	Melbourne Victory	1–4	Sydney FC	Morwell
19:00 AEDT	Taylor 29' (pen.)	Report	Simon 27', 37'; Brogan 88'; Polias 90'	Stadium: Latrobe City Stadium; Referee: Catherine Hofmann

20 November 2010 3	Sydney FC	4–1	Adelaide United	Wollongong
15:00 AEDT	Khamis 10'; Ledbrook 59'; Cannuli 80'; Foord 90+1'	Report	Gunning 41'	Stadium: WIN Stadium; Attendance: 640; Referee: Peta McCallum

27 November 2010 4	Sydney FC	1–2	Newcastle Jets	Sydney
15:00 AEDT	Khamis 31'	Report	Andrews 84', 90'	Stadium: Campbelltown Stadium; Referee: Kiralee Gardiner

11 December 2010 6	Sydney FC	2–0	Perth Glory	Wollongong
15:00 AEDT	Khamis 55'; Simon 71'	Report		Stadium: WIN Stadium; Attendance: 246; Referee: Sachiko Yamagashi

18 December 2010 7	Adelaide United	0–4	Sydney FC	Adelaide
14:30 ACDT		Report	Khamis 16'; Simon 45', 77'; Ledbrook 53'	Stadium: Hindmarsh Stadium; Referee: Jacqui Melksham

1 January 2011 8	Sydney FC	0–1	Brisbane Roar	Sydney
15:00 AEDT		Report	Burgess 49'	Stadium: Campbelltown Stadium; Referee: Kate Jacewicz

9 January 2011 9	Perth Glory	1–5	Sydney FC	Perth
17:00 AWST	McCallum 69'	Report	Khamis 3', 8'; Simon 47', 74', 90+1'	Stadium: 6PR Stadium; Referee: Kate Jacewicz

22 January 2011 11	Sydney FC	3–0	Canberra United	Sydney
17:00 AEDT	Brush 48' (o.g.); Cannuli 76'; Simon 82'	Report		Stadium: Seymour Shaw Park; Attendance: 973; Referee: Kate Jacewicz

29 January 2011 12	Newcastle Jets	1–2	Sydney FC	Newcastle
15:00 AEDT	Crawford 62'	Report	Simon 56'; Uzunlar 72' (pen.)	Stadium: Wanderers Oval; Referee: Peta McCallum

==== Finals series ====
6 February 2011 Semi-finals	Sydney FC	5–1	Melbourne Victory	Sydney
15:00 AEDT	Khamis 26', 75'; Uzunlar 38' (pen.); Simon 74'; Bolger 88'	Report	Catley 30'	Stadium: Campbelltown Stadium; Attendance: 912; Referee: Kirralee Gardiner

12 February 2011 Grand Final	Sydney FC	1–2	Brisbane Roar	Sydney
15:00 AEDT	Ledbrook 35'	Report	Butt 9'; De Vanna 64'	Stadium: Campbelltown Stadium; Attendance: 1,872; Referee: Kate Jacewicz

== Statistics ==
Last updated 10 October 2009

No.	Pos.	Name	W-League		W-League Finals		Total		Discipline	
No.	Pos.	Name	Apps	Goals	Apps	Goals	Apps	Goals	Yellow card	Red card
1	GK	(Australia) Dimi Poulos	0	0	0	0	0	0	0	0
2	DF	(Australia) Teresa Polias	0	0	0	0	0	0	0	0
3	DF	(Australia) Danielle Brogan	0	0	0	0	0	0	0	0
4	DF	(Australia) Alesha Clifford	0	0	0	0	0	0	0	0
5	DF	(Australia) Alanna Kennedy	0	0	0	0	0	0	0	0
6	MF	(Australia) Servet Uzunlar	0	0	0	0	0	0	0	0
7	MF	(Australia) Heather Garriock	0	0	0	0	0	0	0	0
8	FW	(Australia) Renee Rollason	0	0	0	0	0	0	0	0
9	FW	(Australia) Caitlin Foord	0	0	0	0	0	0	0	0
10	MF	(Australia) Kylie Ledbrook	0	0	0	0	0	0	0	0
11	MF	(United States) Lydia Vandenbergh	0	0	0	0	0	0	0	0
13	FW	(Australia) Catherine Cannuli	0	0	0	0	0	0	0	0
14	MF	(Australia) Nicola Bolger	0	0	0	0	0	0	0	0
15	FW	(Australia) Teigen Allen	0	0	0	0	0	0	0	0
16	MF	(Australia) Linda O'Neill	0	0	0	0	0	0	0	0
17	FW	(Australia) Kyah Simon	0	0	0	0	0	0	0	0
18	MF	(Australia) Samantha Spackman	0	0	0	0	0	0	0	0
19	FW	(Australia) Leena Khamis	0	0	0	0	0	0	0	0
20	GK	(Australia) Erin Herd	0	0	0	0	0	0	0	0
