= 2013–14 Sydney FC (women) season =

Sydney WFC
2013–14 season
- Chairman: Scott Barlow
- Manager: Alen Stajcic
- Stadium: Allianz Stadium
- W-League: 2nd
- W-League Finals series: 3rd
- International Women's Club Championship: 3rd
- Top goalscorer: League: Jodie Taylor (10); All: Jodie Taylor (11)
| Home colours | Away colours |

The 2013–14 Sydney FC W-League season was the club's sixth participation in the W-League, since the league's formation in 2008.

== Players ==
=== Squad information ===
Note: Flags indicate national team as defined under FIFA eligibility rules; some limited exceptions apply. Players may hold more than one non-FIFA nationality.

| No. | Pos. | Nation | Player |
|---|---|---|---|
| 1 | GK | AUS | Casey Dumont |
| 2 | MF | AUS | Teresa Polias (Vice-Captain) |
| 3 | DF | AUS | Danielle Brogan (Captain) |
| 4 | DF | AUS | Alesha Clifford |
| 5 | DF | AUS | Elizabeth Ralston |
| 6 | MF | AUS | Natalie Tobin |
| 7 | MF | AUS | Nicola Bolger |
| 8 | DF | AUS | Amy Harrison |
| 9 | DF | AUS | Caitlin Foord (on loan from Sky Blue FC) |
| 10 | DF | AUS | Renee Rollason |

| No. | Pos. | Nation | Player |
|---|---|---|---|
| 11 | DF | NZL | Anna Green |
| 12 | MF | AUS | Chloe Logarzo |
| 13 | MF | AUS | Trudy Camilleri |
| 14 | FW | ENG | Jodie Taylor |
| 15 | MF | AUS | Melissa Caceres |
| 16 | DF | AUS | Ellyse Perry |
| 17 | GK | AUS | Sham Khamis |
| 18 | FW | NZL | Emma Kete |
| 19 | FW | AUS | Leena Khamis |
| 20 | MF | AUS | Samantha Kerr |

=== Transfers in ===
Note: Flags indicate national team as defined under FIFA eligibility rules; some limited exceptions apply. Players may hold more than one non-FIFA nationality.

| No. | Pos. | Nation | Player |
|---|---|---|---|
| 1 | GK | AUS | Casey Dumont (from (Australia) Brisbane Roar) |
| 9 | DF | AUS | Caitlin Foord (on loan from (United States) Sky Blue FC) |
| 4 | DF | AUS | Alesha Clifford (from (Australia) Western Sydney Wanderers) |
| 13 | MF | AUS | Trudy Camilleri (from (Australia) Western Sydney Wanderers) |
| 14 | FW | ENG | Jodie Taylor (from (England) Birmingham City Ladies) |
| 15 | MF | AUS | Melissa Caceres (from (Australia) Marconi Stallions) |
| 11 | DF | NZL | Anna Green (from (Germany) Lokomotive Leipzig) |

=== Transfers out ===
Note: Flags indicate national team as defined under FIFA eligibility rules; some limited exceptions apply. Players may hold more than one non-FIFA nationality.

| No. | Pos. | Nation | Player |
|---|---|---|---|
| 5 | FW | AUS | Meg McLaughlin (to (Australia) Canberra United) |
| 13 | FW | AUS | Larissa Crummer (to (Australia) Brisbane Roar) |
| 14 | MF | AUS | Alanna Kennedy (to (Australia) Western Sydney Wanderers) |
| 18 | MF | AUS | Brittany Whitfield |
| 1 | GK | AUS | Sian McLaren (to (Australia) Sydney University) |
| 11 | MF | NZL | Annalie Longo (to (New Zealand) Mainland Pride) |
| 15 | DF | NZL | Hannah Bromley (to (Australia) Northbridge FC) |

== Technical staff ==
| Position | Name |
|---|---|
| Head coach | (Australia) Alen Stajcic |
| Assistant coach | (Australia) Daniel Barrett |
| Assistant coach | (Australia) Leena Khamis |
| Goalkeeping coach | (Australia) Davide Del Giovine |

== Squad statistics ==
=== Disciplinary record ===
| N | Pos. | Nat. | Name | Yellow card | Second yellow card | Red card | Notes |
|---|---|---|---|---|---|---|---|
| 1 | GK | (Australia) | Casey Dumont | 0 | 0 | 0 | |
| 2 | MF | (Australia) | Teresa Polias | 0 | 0 | 0 | |
| 3 | DF | (Australia) | Danielle Brogan | 0 | 0 | 0 | |
| 4 | DF | (Australia) | Alesha Clifford | 2 | 0 | 0 | |
| 5 | DF | (Australia) | Elizabeth Ralston | 0 | 0 | 0 | |
| 6 | MF | (Australia) | Natalie Tobin | 0 | 0 | 0 | |
| 7 | MF | (Australia) | Nicola Bolger | 0 | 0 | 0 | |
| 8 | DF | (Australia) | Amy Harrison | 2 | 0 | 0 | |
| 9 | DF | (Australia) | Caitlin Foord | 2 | 0 | 0 | |
| 10 | DF | (Australia) | Renee Rollason | 1 | 0 | 0 | |
| 11 | DF | (New Zealand) | Anna Green | 0 | 0 | 0 | |
| 12 | MF | (Australia) | Chloe Logarzo | 0 | 0 | 0 | |
| 13 | MF | (Australia) | Trudy Camilleri | 0 | 0 | 0 | |
| 14 | FW | (England) | Jodie Taylor | 1 | 0 | 0 | |
| 15 | MF | (Australia) | Melissa Caceres | 0 | 0 | 0 | |
| 16 | DF | (Australia) | Ellyse Perry | 0 | 0 | 0 | |
| 17 | GK | (Australia) | Sham Khamis | 0 | 0 | 0 | |
| 18 | FW | (New Zealand) | Emma Kete | 0 | 0 | 0 | |
| 19 | FW | (Australia) | Leena Khamis | 1 | 0 | 0 | |
| 20 | MF | (Australia) | Samantha Kerr | 0 | 1 | 0 | |

Last updated: 10 February 2014
Source: Competitive matches
Only competitive matches
(yellow card) = Number of bookings; (second yellow card) = Number of sending offs after a second yellow card; (red card) = Number of sending offs by a direct red card.

=== Goal scorers ===
| Total | Player | | Goals per round | | | | | | | | | | | |
| Total | Player | | 1 | 2 | 3 | 4 | 5 | 6 | 7 | 8 | 9 | 10 | 11 | 12 |
|---|---|---|---|---|---|---|---|---|---|---|---|---|---|---|
| 10 | (England) | Jodie Taylor | 1 | 2 | | 1 | | | 1 | | 2 | 1 | 2 | |
| 5 | (Australia) | Caitlin Foord | | | | | | | 3 | 2 | | | | |
| 5 | (Australia) | Nicola Bolger | 2 | | | 1 | | | 1 | 1 | | | | |
| 4 | (New Zealand) | Emma Kete | 1 | | | | 1 | | 1 | | 1 | | | |
| 4 | (Australia) | Leena Khamis | 1 | | | | | | 1 | | 1 | | 1 | |
| 3 | (Australia) | Renee Rollason | | 1 | 1 | | | 1 | | | | | | |
| 3 | (Australia) | Samantha Kerr | | 1 | | 1 | | | | | | | | 1 |
| 1 | (Australia) | Chloe Logarzo | | | | | | | 1 | | | | | |
| 1 | (Australia) | Amy Harrison | | | | | | | | | | 1 | | |
| 1 | - | Own goal | | | | 1 | | | | | | | | |
| 37 | Total | | 5 | 4 | 1 | 4 | 1 | 1 | 8 | 3 | 4 | 2 | 3 | 1 |

== Competitions ==
=== Overall ===
| Competition | Started round | Current position / round | Final position / round | First match | Last match |
|---|---|---|---|---|---|
| W-League | — | — | 2nd | 10 November 2013 | 9 February 2014 |
| W-League Finals series | Semi-finals | Semi-finals | 3rd | 16 February 2014 | 16 February 2014 |
| IWCC Cup | Play-off | Third place match | 3rd | 30 November 2013 | 8 December 2013 |

=== W-League ===
==== Pre-season ====
| 28 September 2013 | Macarthur Rams (Australia) | 0 – 3 | (Australia) Sydney FC | Sydney |
| Saturday 14:30 AEST | | FB Status Report | Doe 33', 60'; Rollason 76' | Stadium: Campbelltown Stadium |

| 19 October 2013 | Newcastle Jets | 1 – 3 | Sydney FC | Newcastle |
| Saturday 10:00 AEDT | Dobson 19' | | Khamis 17'; Taylor 33'; Bolger 55' | Stadium: Adamstown Oval |

==== Matches ====
| 10 November 2013 1 | Melbourne Victory | 1 – 5 | Sydney FC | Melbourne |
| 15:00 AEDT | Checker 3' | Report | L. Khamis 18'; Bolger 21', 73'; Taylor 59'; Kete 89' | Stadium: Lakeside Stadium; Referee: Kirralee Andruschak |

| 16 November 2013 2 | Sydney FC | 4 – 0 | Newcastle Jets | Wollongong |
| 15:00 AEDT | Rollason 45'; Kerr 68'; Taylor 80', 89' | Report | | Stadium: WIN Stadium; Referee: Rebecca Durcau |

| 29 January 2014 3 | Canberra United | 2 – 1 | Sydney FC | Canberra |
| 19:00 AEDT | Heyman 9'; Munoz 57' (pen.) | Report | Rollason 35' | Stadium: McKellar Park; Attendance: 865; Referee: Kirralee Andruschak |

| 15 January 2014 4 | Sydney FC | 4 – 3 | Western Sydney Wanderers | Sydney |
| 19:30 AEDT | Kerr 5'; Allen 7' (o.g.); Taylor 47' (pen.); Bolger 58' | Report | Carney 70'; Garriock 78'; Cannuli 81' | Stadium: Jubilee Oval |

| 15 December 2013 5 | Sydney FC | 1 – 1 | Melbourne Victory | Sydney |
| 14:15 AEDT | Kete 33' | Report | Fishlock 81' | Stadium: Allianz Stadium; Attendance: 1,480; Referee: Casey Reibelt |

| 22 December 2013 6 | Brisbane Roar | 1 – 1 | Sydney FC | Brisbane |
| 15:00 AEST | Raso 56' | Report | Rollason 5' | Stadium: Goodwin Park; Referee: Kirralee Andruschak |

| 5 January 2014 7 | Sydney FC | 8 – 2 | Perth Glory | Sydney |
| 15:00 AEDT | Foord 15', 65', 90'; L. Khamis 36'; Taylor 42'; Kete 45'; Bolger 85'; Logarzo 89' | Report | K. Gill 29'; Tabain 48' | Stadium: Jubilee Oval; Referee: Casey Reibelt |

| 11 January 2014 8 | Newcastle Jets | 0 – 3 | Sydney FC | Newcastle |
| 15:00 AEDT | | Report | Bolger 15'; Foord 40', 78' | Stadium: Wanderers Oval; Referee: Rachel Mitchenson |

| 19 January 2014 9 | Sydney FC | 4 – 0 | Brisbane Roar | Sydney |
| 15:00 AEDT | Kete 18'; L. Khamis 20'; Taylor 44', 79' | Report | | Stadium: Sydney United Sports Centre; Referee: Kate Jacewicz |

| 24 January 2014 10 | Adelaide United | 1 – 2 | Sydney FC | Adelaide |
| 20:00 ACDT | Moore 52' | Report | Taylor 24'; Harrison 90+5' | Stadium: The Shores; Attendance: 1,006; Referee: Lara Smith |

| 2 February 2014 11 | Western Sydney Wanderers | 1 – 3 | Sydney FC | Sydney |
| 15:00 AEDT | Cannuli 90+5' (pen.) | Report | L. Khamis 8'; Taylor 37', 57' | Stadium: Campbelltown Stadium; Referee: Kate Jacewicz |

| 9 February 2014 12 | Sydney FC | 1 – 2 | Canberra United | Sydney |
| 17:15 AEDT | Kerr 24' | Report | Munoz 13' (pen.); Ochs 60' | Stadium: Sydney United Sports Centre; Referee: Lara Smith |

==== League table ====
| Pos | Team | Pld | W | D | L | GF | GA | GD | Pts | Qualification |
|---|---|---|---|---|---|---|---|---|---|---|
| 1 | Canberra United | 12 | 9 | 0 | 3 | 28 | 8 | +20 | 27 | Qualification to Finals series |
| 2 | Sydney FC | 12 | 8 | 2 | 2 | 37 | 14 | +23 | 26 | Qualification to Finals series |
| 3 | Melbourne Victory (C) | 12 | 7 | 2 | 3 | 23 | 12 | +11 | 23 | Qualification to Finals series |
| 4 | Brisbane Roar | 12 | 7 | 2 | 3 | 22 | 16 | +6 | 23 | Qualification to Finals series |
| 5 | Perth Glory | 12 | 5 | 0 | 7 | 17 | 31 | −14 | 15 | |
| 6 | Adelaide United | 12 | 3 | 4 | 5 | 12 | 15 | −3 | 13 | |
| 7 | Western Sydney Wanderers | 12 | 2 | 3 | 7 | 17 | 23 | −6 | 9 | |
| 8 | Newcastle Jets | 12 | 0 | 1 | 11 | 10 | 47 | −37 | 1 | |

Source: au.soccerway.com
Rules for classification: 1) points; 2) goal difference; 3) number of goals scored.
(C) Champions

==== Results summary ====
| Overall | | | | | | | | Home | | | | | | Away | | | | | |
| Pld | W | D | L | GF | GA | GD | Pts | W | D | L | GF | GA | GD | W | D | L | GF | GA | GD |
|---|---|---|---|---|---|---|---|---|---|---|---|---|---|---|---|---|---|---|---|
| 12 | 8 | 2 | 2 | 37 | 14 | +23 | 26 | 4 | 1 | 1 | 22 | 8 | +14 | 4 | 1 | 1 | 15 | 6 | +9 |

Last updated: 10 February 2014.
Source: Competitive Matches

==== Results by round ====
| Round | 1 | 2 | 3 | 4 | 5 | 6 | 7 | 8 | 9 | 10 | 11 | 12 |
|---|---|---|---|---|---|---|---|---|---|---|---|---|
| Ground | A | H | A | H | H | A | H | A | H | A | A | H |
| Result | W | W | L | W | D | D | W | W | W | W | W | L |
| Position | 1 | 1 | 1 (Note: Round 3 was postponed (played between rounds 10 and 11) due to clash with the International Women's Club Championship. At the conclusion of both non-postponed matches of round 3 and after the postponed match, Sydney FC were 1st place.) | 3\2 (Note: Round 4 was postponed (played between rounds 8 and 9) due to clash with the International Women's Club Championship. The first position (3) is after the non-postponed matches of round 4. The second position (2) is after the postponed match.) | 4 | 4 | 4 | 3 | 1 | 1 | 1 | 2 |

Updated to match(es) played on 10 February 2014. Source: Competitive Matches
A = Away; H = Home; W = Win; D = Draw; L = Loss

=== W-League Finals series ===
| 16 February 2014 Semi-final | Sydney FC | 2 – 3 | Melbourne Victory | Sydney |
| 15:00 AEDT | Kerr 45+1'; L. Khamis 52' | Report | Fishlock 22'; Humble 36'; Barnes 71' (pen.) | Stadium: Jubilee Oval; Referee: Kate Jacewicz |

=== International Women's Club Championship ===
==== Matches ====
| 30 November 2013 Play-off | Sydney FC (Australia) | 1 – 0 | (Japan) NTV Beleza | Okayama |
| Saturday 12:30 JST | Kete 61' | Report; Summary | | Stadium: Kanko Stadium; Attendance: 1,652; Referee: Jung Ji-Young (South Korea) |

| 4 December 2013 Semi-final | Chelsea (England) | 3 – 2 | (Australia) Sydney FC | Okayama |
| Wednesday 18:30 JST | Coombs 36'; Aluko 52'; Ōgimi 57' | Report; Summary | Rollason 75'; Taylor 81' | Stadium: Kanko Stadium; Attendance: 2,201; Referee: Jung Ji-Young (South Korea) |

| 7 December 2013 Third place match | Colo-Colo (Chile) | 3 – 3 (2 – 4 p) | (Australia) Sydney FC | Kagoshima |
| Saturday 13:10 JST | Ascanio 8'; Lara 86', 88' | Report; Summary | Perry 22'; Camilleri 23'; Rollason 79' | Stadium: Kagoshima Kamoike Stadium; Attendance: 1,289; Referee: Sachiko Yamagishi (Japan) |
| | Penalties |
| | Sáez (penalty missed); Lara (penalty scored); C. Soto (penalty missed); Villamayor (penalty scored) | | (penalty scored) Rollason; (penalty missed) Dumont; (penalty scored) Green; (penalty scored) Bolger; (penalty scored) Kerr |

== Awards ==
- Player of the Week (Round 1) - Nicola Bolger
- Player of the Week (Round 7) - Jodie Taylor
- Player of the Week (Round 9) - Teresa Polias
- Player of the Week (Round 11) - Leena Khamis
