= 2014 Sydney FC (women) season =

Sydney WFC
2014 season
- Chairman: Scott Barlow
- Manager: Alen Stajcic (until 11 October 2014); Daniel Barrett (from 11 October 2014)
- Stadium: Lambert Park / Leichhardt Oval
- W-League: 4th
- W-League Finals series: Semi-finals
- Top goalscorer: Jasmyne Spencer (8)
Home colours	Away colours

The 2014 Sydney FC W-League season was the club's seventh participation in the W-League, since the league's formation in 2008.

== Players ==
=== Squad information ===
Note: Flags indicate national team as defined under FIFA eligibility rules; some limited exceptions apply. Players may hold more than one non-FIFA nationality.

No.	Pos.	Nation	Player
1	GK	AUS	Casey Dumont
2	MF	AUS	Teresa Polias (Captain)
3	DF	AUS	Elizabeth Ralston
4	DF	AUS	Alesha Clifford
5	FW	USA	Jasmyne Spencer (on loan from Western New York Flash)
6	MF	AUS	Servet Uzunlar
7	MF	AUS	Nicola Bolger
8	MF	AUS	Amy Harrison
9	DF	AUS	Ellyse Perry
10	MF	AUS	Renee Rollason
11	DF	AUS	Natalie Tobin

No.	Pos.	Nation	Player
12	FW	AUS	Chloe Logarzo
13	MF	AUS	Trudy Camilleri
14	DF	AUS	Olivia Price
15	DF	AUS	Teigen Allen
16	DF	USA	Samantha Johnson
17	FW	AUS	Kyah Simon
18	FW	AUS	Heidi Makrillos
19	FW	AUS	Leena Khamis
20	GK	AUS	Alyssa Harris
21	GK	AUS	Sian McLaren
23	MF	AUS	Melissa Caceres

=== Transfers in ===
Note: Flags indicate national team as defined under FIFA eligibility rules; some limited exceptions apply. Players may hold more than one non-FIFA nationality.

No.	Pos.	Nation	Player
14	MF	AUS	Olivia Price (re-signed after being used as an injury-replacement)
17	FW	AUS	Kyah Simon (from (Australia) Western Sydney Wanderers)
6	DF	AUS	Servet Uzunlar (from (Australia) Western Sydney Wanderers)
15	DF	AUS	Teigen Allen (from (United States) Western New York Flash)
16	DF	USA	Samantha Johnson (from (United States) Chicago Red Stars)
20	GK	AUS	Alyssa Harris (from (Australia) Manly United)
5	FW	USA	Jasmyne Spencer (on loan from (United States) Western New York Flash)
18	FW	AUS	Heidi Makrillos (from (Australia) North West Sydney Koalas)
21	GK	AUS	Sian McLaren (from (Australia) Sydney Uni SFC)

=== Transfers out ===
Note: Flags indicate national team as defined under FIFA eligibility rules; some limited exceptions apply. Players may hold more than one non-FIFA nationality.

No.	Pos.	Nation	Player
3	DF	AUS	Danielle Brogan (to (England) Notts County)
9	DF	AUS	Caitlin Foord (loan return to (United States) Sky Blue FC)
11	DF	NZL	Anna Green (to (England) Notts County)
14	FW	ENG	Jodie Taylor (to (United States) Washington Spirit)
17	GK	AUS	Sham Khamis (to (Australia) Western Sydney Wanderers)
18	FW	NZL	Emma Kete (to (United States) Western New York Flash)
20	MF	AUS	Sam Kerr (to (Australia) Perth Glory)

== Technical staff ==
Position	Name
Head coach	(Australia) Daniel Barrett
Assistant coach	(Australia) Leena Khamis
Goalkeeping coach	(Australia) Davide Del Giovine

== Competitions ==
=== W-League ===
==== Fixtures ====
14 September 2014 1	Sydney FC	2–0	Adelaide United	Sydney
16:00 AEST	Spencer 39', 70'	Report		Stadium: Lambert Park; Referee: Kiralee Andruschak

21 September 2014 2	Brisbane Roar	1–2	Sydney FC	Brisbane
15:00 AEST	Gielnik 37'	Report	Rollason 17', 76'; Allen (yellow card) ?' (red card) 61'	Stadium: QSAC; Referee: Rebecca Durcau

27 September 2014 3	Western Sydney Wanderers	0–2	Sydney FC	Sydney
15:00 AEST	O'Neill (yellow card) ?' (red card) 80'	Report	Spencer 13'; Harrison 58'	Stadium: Marconi Stadium; Attendance: 3,084; Referee: Kiralee Andruschak

6 October 2014 4	Sydney FC	1–1	Melbourne Victory	Sydney
17:00 AEDT	Spencer 60'	Report	Simon 86'	Stadium: Lambert Park; Attendance: 733; Referee: Kate Jacewicz

11 October 2014 5	Newcastle Jets	0–1	Sydney FC	Newcastle
15:00 AEDT		Report	Spencer 28'	Stadium: Wanderers Oval

18 October 2014 6	Perth Glory	1–0	Sydney FC	Perth
15:00 AWST	Tabain 51'	Report		Stadium: Ashfield Reserve; Referee: Casey Reibelt

26 October 2014 7	Sydney FC	1–2	Western Sydney Wanderers	Sydney
15:00 AEDT	Spencer 55'	Report	Winters 16'; Allen 63' (o.g.)	Stadium: Sydney United Sports Centre; Referee: Rachel Mitchenson

1 November 2014 8	Sydney FC	1–1	Brisbane Roar	Sydney
17:00 AEDT	Spencer 85'	Report	Butt 65'	Stadium: Lambert Park; Referee: Kate Jacewicz

9 November 2014 9	Canberra United	3–0	Sydney FC	Canberra
15:00 AEDT	Rojahn 22'; Heyman 40'; Ochs 76'	Report		Stadium: McKellar Park; Attendance: 864; Referee: Rebecca Durcau

14 November 2014 10	Adelaide United	0–5	Sydney FC	Adelaide
19:30 ACDT		Report	Bolger 22', 53'; Rollason 27'; Price 67'; Spencer 90+3'	Stadium: Adelaide Shores Football Centre; Referee: Casey Reibelt

30 November 2014 11	Sydney FC	0–5	Perth Glory	Sydney
15:00 AEDT		Report	Kerr 7', 56', 73'; K. Gill 25' (pen.); Foord 45+1'	Stadium: Leichhardt Oval; Referee: Kate Jacewicz

6 December 2014 12	Sydney FC	2–2	Newcastle Jets	Sydney
17:00 AEDT	Harrison 22'; Simon 80' (pen.)	Report	Dobson 50'; Andrews 70'	Stadium: Lambert Park

==== League table ====
Pos	Team	Pld	W	D	L	GF	GA	GD	Pts	Qualification
1	Perth Glory	12	10	0	2	39	10	+29	30	Qualification to Finals series
2	Melbourne Victory	12	6	2	4	26	15	+11	20	Qualification to Finals series
3	Canberra United (C)	12	6	2	4	22	18	+4	20	Qualification to Finals series
4	Sydney FC	12	5	3	4	17	16	+1	18	Qualification to Finals series
5	Newcastle Jets	12	5	2	5	25	21	+4	17	
6	Brisbane Roar	12	4	2	6	18	19	−1	14	
7	Adelaide United	12	3	1	8	9	29	−20	10	
8	Western Sydney Wanderers	12	2	2	8	14	42	−28	8	

Source: au.soccerway.com
Rules for classification: 1) points; 2) goal difference; 3) number of goals scored.
(C) Champions

==== Results summary ====
Overall								Home						Away					
Pld	W	D	L	GF	GA	GD	Pts	W	D	L	GF	GA	GD	W	D	L	GF	GA	GD
12	5	3	4	17	16	+1	18	1	3	2	7	11	−4	4	0	2	10	5	+5

Last updated: 6 December 2014.
Source: Competitive Matches

==== Results by round ====
Round	1	2	3	4	5	6	7	8	9	10	11	12
Ground	H	A	A	H	A	A	H	H	A	A	H	H
Result	W	W	W	D	W	L	L	D	L	W	L	D
Position	2	2	1	2	2	2	2	2	4	3	4	4

Updated to match(es) played on 6 December 2014. Source: Competitive Matches
A = Away; H = Home; W = Win; D = Draw; L = Loss

==== Goal scorers ====
Total	Player		Goals per Round											
Total	Player		1	2	3	4	5	6	7	8	9	10	11	12
8	(United States)	Jasmyne Spencer	2		1	1	1		1	1		1		
3	(Australia)	Renee Rollason		2								1		
2	(Australia)	Nicola Bolger										2		
2	(Australia)	Amy Harrison			1									1
1	(Australia)	Olivia Price										1		
1	(Australia)	Kyah Simon												1
17	TOTAL		2	2	2	1	1	0	1	1	0	5	0	2

=== W-League Finals series ===
14 December 2014 Semi-final	Perth Glory	3–0	Sydney FC	Perth
12:00 AWST	D'Ovidio 10'; K. Gill 37'; Marzano 70'	Report		Stadium: nib Stadium; Attendance: 1,389; Referee: Casey Reibelt
