= 2009 W-League grand final (December) =

- Event: 2009 W-League
Sydney FC	Brisbane Roar
3	2
- Date: 19 December 2009
- Venue: Toyota Stadium, Sydney, New South Wales, Australia
- Referee: Kate Jacewicz
- Attendance: 1,439

The 2009 W-League grand final was the grand final of the second season of the Australian W-League football (soccer) competition. It was contested between premiers Sydney FC and third-placed Brisbane Roar at Toyota Stadium in Sydney on Saturday, 19 December 2009. Sydney FC became the second W-League champions after defeating the Brisbane Roar 3–2.

== Match details ==
19 December 2009
16:00 AEDT

Sydney FC	3–2	Brisbane Roar
O'Neill 66'; Walsh 73'; Rydahl 78'	Report; Summary	Harch 15'; Butt 90+3' (pen.)

Toyota Stadium
Attendance: 1,439
Referee: Kate Jacewicz

Sydney	Brisbane

SYDNEY FC:
GK	1	(Australia) Nikola Deiter
DF	2	(Australia) Teigen Allen
MF	6	(Australia) Servet Uzunlar
MF	7	(Australia) Heather Garriock (c)	(yellow card) 49'
MF	8	(Denmark) Julie Rydahl
FW	9	(Australia) Sarah Walsh		(substituted off) 89'
MF	10	(Australia) Kylie Ledbrook
MF	11	(Denmark) Cathrine Paaske	(yellow card) 64'	(substituted off) 91'
FW	15	(Australia) Kyah Simon
MF	16	(Australia) Linda O'Neill
FW	19	(Australia) Leena Khamis		(substituted off) 84'
Substitutes:
FW	12	(Australia) Michelle Carney		(substituted on) 91'
FW	13	(Australia) Catherine Cannuli		(substituted on) 84'
MF	18	(Australia) Brittany Whitfield		(substituted on) 89'
GK	20	(Australia) Carla Monforte
Manager:
(Australia) Alen Stajcic

BRISBANE ROAR:
GK	1	(Australia) Casey Dumont
DF	2	(Australia) Kate McShea
DF	3	(Australia) Karla Reuter
DF	4	(Australia) Clare Polkinghorne (c)
FW	6	(Australia) Joanne Burgess
MF	8	(Australia) Elise Kellond-Knight
FW	10	(Australia) Lana Harch	(substituted off) 72'
MF	11	(Australia) Aivi Luik
MF	13	(Australia) Tameka Butt
MF	16	(Australia) Lauren Colthorpe
MF	19	(Australia) Ellen Beaumont
Substitutes:
	7	(Australia) Pam Bignold
MF	12	(Australia) Stephanie Latham	(substituted on) 83'
??	15	(Australia) Leah Curtis
	18	(Australia) Courtney Beutel	(substituted on) 72' (substituted off) 83'
GK	20	(Australia) Kate Stewart
Manager:
(Australia) Jeff Hopkins

Player of the Match:
Servet Uzunlar (Sydney FC)

Assistant referees:
Sarah Ho
Allyson Flynn
Fourth official:
Kirralee Gardiner

== See also ==
- W-League records and statistics
