= 2008–09 Sydney FC (women) season =

Sydney FC (W-League)
2008–09 season
- Head Coach: Alen Stajcic
- W-League: 4th
- W-League Finals: Semi-finals
- Top goalscorer: Leena Khamis (7)
- Highest home attendance: 795 vs. Adelaide United (27 December 2008); W-League
- Lowest home attendance: 300 vs. Perth Glory (13 December 2008); W-League
- Average home league attendance: 582
- Biggest win: 4–0 vs. Perth Glory (A) (25 October 2008); W-League
- Biggest defeat: 0–3 vs. Queensland Roar (A) (29 November 2008); W-League
Home colours	Away colours

The 2008–09 season was Sydney Football Club (W-League)'s first season, in the newly formed women's league in Australia the W-League. Sydney FC finished 4th in their W-League season, finishing in the semi-finals.

== Players ==
Note: Flags indicate national team as defined under FIFA eligibility rules; some limited exceptions apply. Players may hold more than one non-FIFA nationality.

No.	Pos.	Nation	Player
1	GK	AUS	Rachel Cooper
2	MF	AUS	Samantha Spackman
3	DF	AUS	Danielle Brogan
4	DF	AUS	Alesha Clifford
5	DF	AUS	Lisa Gilbert
6	MF	AUS	Servet Uzunlar
7	MF	AUS	Heather Garriock (Captain)
8	FW	AUS	Joanne Burgess
9	FW	AUS	Sarah Walsh
10	MF	AUS	Kylie Ledbrook
11	FW	AUS	Michelle Heyman
12	MF	AUS	Carlie Ikonumou

No.	Pos.	Nation	Player
13	FW	AUS	Loren Mahoney
14	MF	AUS	Maggie Elhusseini
15	DF	AUS	Jessica Seaman
16	MF	AUS	Linda O'Neill
17	FW	AUS	Danielle Small
18	MF	AUS	Nicola Bolger
19	FW	AUS	Leena Khamis
20	GK	AUS	Nikola Dieter
21	MF	AUS	Jordan Marsh
22	MF	AUS	Kelly Golebiowski
23	MF	AUS	Leah Blayney

== Competitions ==
=== Overall record ===
Competition	First match	Last match	Starting round	Final position	Record							
Competition	First match	Last match	Starting round	Final position	Pld	W	D	L	GF	GA	GD	Win %
W-League	25 October 2008	27 December 2008	Matchday 1	4th	10	4	2	4	15	14	+1	40.00
W-League Finals	11 January 2009		Semi-finals	Semi-finals	1	0	1	0	1	1	+0	0.00
Total					11	4	3	4	16	15	+1	36.36

Source: Competitions

=== W-League ===
==== League table ====
Pos	Team	Pld	W	D	L	GF	GA	GD	Pts	Qualification
1	Queensland Roar (C)	10	8	1	1	27	7	+20	25	Qualification to Finals series
2	Newcastle Jets	10	5	2	3	17	12	+5	17	Qualification to Finals series
3	Canberra United	10	4	4	2	14	10	+4	16	Qualification to Finals series
4	Sydney FC	10	4	2	4	15	14	+1	14	Qualification to Finals series
5	Melbourne Victory	10	4	0	6	13	13	0	12	
6	Central Coast Mariners	10	4	0	6	15	20	−5	12	
7	Perth Glory	10	3	2	5	14	24	−10	11	
8	Adelaide United	10	2	1	7	13	28	−15	7	

Rules for classification: 1) points; 2) goal difference; 3) number of goals scored.
(C) Champions

==== Results summary ====
Overall								Home						Away					
Pld	W	D	L	GF	GA	GD	Pts	W	D	L	GF	GA	GD	W	D	L	GF	GA	GD
10	4	2	4	15	14	+1	14	3	1	1	8	5	+3	1	1	3	7	9	−2

Source: worldfootball.net

==== Results by round ====
Round	1	2	3	4	5	6	7	8	9	10
Ground	A	H	A	H	H	A	A	H	A	H
Result	W	W	L	D	W	L	D	L	L	W
Position	1	1	1	2	2	3	3	5	5	4
Points	3	6	6	7	10	10	11	11	11	14

Source: worldfootball.net
A = Away; H = Home; W = Win; D = Draw; L = Loss

==== Matches ====
The league fixtures were announced on 1 October 2008.

Win Draw Loss

25 October 2008 1	Perth Glory	0–4	Sydney FC	Perth
13:00 AWST		Report	Khamis 6', 8'; Small 39'; Garriock 61'	Stadium: Members Equity Stadium; Referee: Sara Hodson

1 November 2008 2	Sydney FC	2–1	Melbourne Victory	Sydney
16:00 AEDT	Bolger 55'; Khamis 82'	Report	Groenewald 24'	Stadium: Parramatta Stadium; Referee: Jacqui Melksham

9 November 2008 3	Adelaide United	3–2	Sydney FC	Adelaide
14:30 ACDT	Black 7'; Gilbert 30' (o.g.); Balomenos 48'	Report	Khamis 4'; Ledbrook 69'	Stadium: Hindmarsh Stadium; Attendance: 618; Referee: Kirralee Gardener

15 November 2008 4	Sydney FC	1–1	Newcastle Jets	Sydney
16:00 AEDT	Khamis 48'	Report	Gill 68'	Stadium: Campbelltown Stadium; Referee: Lee Corey

22 November 2008 5	Sydney FC	2–0	Central Coast Mariners	Sydney
18:00 AEDT	Khamis 23'; Gilbert 38'	Report		Stadium: Campbelltown Stadium; Attendance: 652; Referee: Prue Donohoe

29 November 2008 6	Queensland Roar	3–0	Sydney FC	Brisbane
15:00 AEST	Reuter 12'; Ferguson 30'; Beutel 63'	Report		Stadium: Ballymore Stadium; Attendance: 580; Referee: Sara Hodson

6 December 2008 7	Canberra United	1–1	Sydney FC	Canberra
18:00 AEDT	Munoz 37'	Report	Marsh 43'	Stadium: McKellar Park; Attendance: 840; Referee: Prue Donohoe

13 December 2008 8	Sydney FC	0–1	Perth Glory	Sydney
16:00 AEDT		Report	Tabain 64'	Stadium: Parramatta Stadium; Attendance: 300; Referee: Sara Hodson

20 December 2008 9	Newcastle Jets	2–0	Sydney FC	Sydney
16:00 AEDT	Gill 21', 28'	Report		Stadium: Campbelltown Stadium; Attendance: 300; Referee: Jacqui Melksham

27 December 2008 10	Sydney FC	3–2	Adelaide United	Sydney
18:00 AEDT	Khamis 4'; Ledbrook 6'; Burgess 28'	Report	Balomenos 52'; Swaffer 59'	Stadium: Parramatta Stadium; Attendance: 795; Referee: Casey Reibelt

==== Finals series ====
11 January 2009 Semi-finals	Queensland Roar	1–1 (a.e.t.) (5–4 p)	Sydney FC	Brisbane
15:00 AEST	Butt 29'	Report	O'Neill 71'	Stadium: Ballymore Stadium; Attendance: 1,891; Referee: Jacqui Melksham
	Penalties
	Dumount (penalty scored); Butt (penalty scored); Kellond-Knight (penalty scored); Harch (penalty scored); Beaumount (penalty missed); Reuter (penalty scored)		(penalty scored) Brogan; (penalty missed) Bolger; (penalty scored) Clifford; (penalty scored) Ledbrook; (penalty scored) Khamis; (penalty missed) Walsh

== Leading scorers ==
The leading goal scores from the regular season.

Total	Pos	Player		Goals per Round									
Total	Pos	Player		1	2	3	4	5	6	7	8	9	10
7	FW	(Australia)	Leena Khamis	2	1	1	1	1					1
2	MF	(Australia)	Kylie Ledbrook			1							1
1	FW	(Australia)	Jo Burgess										1
1	FW	(Australia)	Danielle Small	1									
1	MF	(Australia)	Nicola Bolger		1								
1	MF	(Australia)	Heather Garriock	1									
1	MF	(Australia)	Jordan Marsh							1			
1	DF	(Australia)	Lisa Gilbert					1					

A goal was scored from a penalty kick

== Awards ==
=== W-League ===
Award	Player	Ref.
2008–09 Golden Boot	Leena Khamis	
