= 2010–11 W-League =

Third season of the top women's football (soccer) league in Australia

- League: W-League
- Sport: Women's association football
- Duration: 2010–2011
- Teams: 7
- TV partner: ABC1

W-League season
- Champions: Brisbane Roar
- Premiers: Sydney FC
- Top scorer: Kyah Simon (12)

W-League seasons
- ← 2009 2011–12 →

The 2010–11 W-League season was the third season of the W-League, the Australian national women's football (soccer) competition. The season consisted of twelve rounds, with each team playing a total of ten games, followed by a finals series.

Sydney FC were crowned premiers after winning the regular season, but lost the Grand Final to season runners-up Brisbane Roar.

== Clubs ==
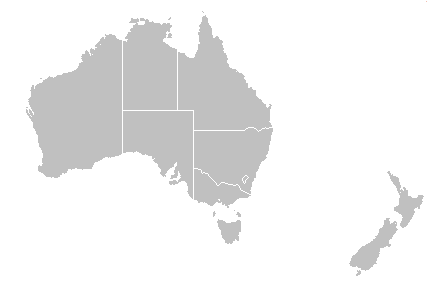

=== Personnel and kits ===
The Central Coast Mariners withdrew from the 2010–11 season prior to the season commencing. W-League teams for the 2010–11 season:

Team	City	Years in competition
Adelaide United	(South Australia) Adelaide, SA	2008–09 — present
Brisbane Roar	(Queensland) Brisbane, Qld	2008–09 — present
Canberra United	(Australian Capital Territory) Canberra, ACT	2008–09 — present
Melbourne Victory	(Victoria (state)) Melbourne, Vic	2008–09 — present
Newcastle Jets	(New South Wales) Newcastle, NSW	2008–09 — present
Perth Glory	(Western Australia) Perth, WA	2008–09 — present
Sydney FC	(New South Wales) Sydney, NSW	2008–09 — present

=== Foreign players ===
Club	Visa 1	Visa 2	Visa 3	Non-Visa foreigner(s)	Former player(s)
Adelaide United	(United States) Ashleigh Gunning			(England) Stacey Day^{B}	
Brisbane Roar	(Trinidad and Tobago) Kennya Cordner				
Canberra United	(Chinese Taipei) Tseng Shu-o				
Melbourne Victory	(England) Jodie Taylor	(New Zealand) Marlies Oostdam	(United States) Kendall Fletcher	(Turkey) Gülcan Koca^{A}	
Newcastle Jets	(United States) Niki Cross	(United States) Alli Lipsher			
Perth Glory	(Denmark) Tine Cederkvist	(Sweden) Alexandra Nilsson	(United States) Alex Singer	(Wales) Carys Hawkins^{A}	
Sydney FC	(United States) Lydia Vandenbergh				

The following do not fill a Visa position:
^{A} Australian citizens who have chosen to represent another national team;
^{B} Those players who were born and started their professional career abroad but have since gained Australian citizenship;
^{G} Guest players;
^{R} Injury replacement players, or national team replacement players;

== Regular season ==
=== League table ===
Pos	Team	Pld	W	D	L	GF	GA	GD	Pts	Qualification
1	Sydney FC	10	8	0	2	29	9	+20	24	Qualification to Finals series
2	Brisbane Roar (C)	10	6	3	1	17	7	+10	21	Qualification to Finals series
3	Canberra United	10	5	2	3	16	9	+7	17	Qualification to Finals series
4	Melbourne Victory	10	4	3	3	12	11	+1	15	Qualification to Finals series
5	Perth Glory	10	4	1	5	11	15	−4	13	
6	Newcastle Jets	10	3	1	6	13	15	−2	10	
7	Adelaide United	10	0	0	10	4	36	−32	0	

Source: au.soccerway.com
Rules for classification: 1) points; 2) goal difference; 3) number of goals scored.
(C) Champions

=== Round 1 ===
6 November 2010	Brisbane Roar	2–4	Sydney FC	Ballymore Stadium, Brisbane
	Butt 14'; Harch 49'	Report	Garriock 6', 54'; Rollason 33'; Simon 36'	Attendance: 1,093; Referee: Jacqui Melksham

6 November 2010	Adelaide United	0–2	Newcastle Jets	Hindmarsh Stadium, Adelaide
		Report	McDonnell 83', 88'	Referee: Stacey Sasopolous

7 November 2010	Perth Glory	1–4	Canberra United	6PR Stadium, Perth
	Gill 41'	Report	Heyman 34', 70', 87'; Maciejewski 57'	Attendance: 423; Referee: Catherine Hoffman

=== Round 2 ===
13 November 2010	Perth Glory	4–0	Adelaide United	nib Stadium, Perth
	Gill 27' (pen.), 32' (pen.); May 36'; Kerr 80'	Report		Referee: Kate Jacewicz

13 November 2010	Canberra United	1–1	Brisbane Roar	McKellar Park, Canberra
	Perry 82'	Report	Butt 45'	Attendance: 794; Referee: Peta McCallum

13 November 2010	Melbourne Victory	1–4	Sydney FC	Latrobe City Stadium, Morwell
	Taylor 29' (pen.)	Report	Simon 30', 37'; Ledbrook 84'; Cannuli 90+'	Referee: Catherine Hoffman

=== Round 3 ===
20 November 2010	Canberra United	1–1	Melbourne Victory	McKellar Park, Canberra
	Cooper 6'	Report	Ruyter-Hooley 94'	Attendance: 836; Referee: Kate Jacewicz

20 November 2010	Newcastle Jets	0–4	Brisbane Roar	Wanderers Oval, Newcastle
		Report	Harch 2', 60'; Butt 25'; De Vanna 72' (pen.)	Referee: Kirralee Gardiner

20 November 2010	Sydney FC	4–1	Adelaide United	WIN Stadium, Wollongong
	Khamis 10'; Ledbrook 59'; Cannuli 80'; Foord 91'	Report	Gunning 41' (pen.)	Attendance: 640; Referee: Peta McCallum

=== Round 4 ===
26 November 2010	Adelaide United	0–4	Melbourne Victory	Hindmarsh Stadium, Adelaide
		Report	Fletcher 32'; Friend 47'; Taylor 52', 91'	Referee: Stacey Sasopolous

27 November 2010	Sydney FC	1–2	Newcastle Jets	Campbelltown Stadium, Campbelltown
	Khamis 31'	Report	Andrews 84', 90'	Referee: Kiralee Gardiner

27 November 2010	Brisbane Roar	1–0	Perth Glory	Perry Park, Brisbane
	De Vanna 90+3'	Report		Referee: Jacqui Melksham

=== Round 5 ===
4 December 2010	Melbourne Victory	1–4	Brisbane Roar	AAMI Park, Melbourne
	Friend 65'	Report	Butt 23', 25'; De Vanna 71'; Gielnik 81'	Referee: Peta McCallum

4 December 2010	Canberra United	4–0	Adelaide United	Deakin Stadium, Canberra
	Munoz 6'; Heyman 9', 16'; Brush 21'	Report		Attendance: 576; Referee: Kirralee Gardener

5 December 2010	Perth Glory	1–0	Newcastle Jets	6PR Stadium, Perth
	Gibbons 4'	Report		Referee: Stacey Sasopolous

=== Round 6 ===
10 December 2010	Adelaide United	1–3	Brisbane Roar	Hindmarsh Stadium, Adelaide
	Kuralay 28'	Report	Carroll 71'; Kellond-Knight 32'; Colthorpe 38'	Referee: Catherine Hoffman

11 December 2010	Newcastle Jets	0–1	Canberra United	Energy Australia Stadium, Newcastle
		Report	Heyman 36'	Attendance: 349; Referee: Peta McCallum

11 December 2010	Sydney FC	2–0	Perth Glory	WIN Stadium, Wollongong
	Khamis 55'; Simon 71'	Report		Attendance: 246; Referee: Sachiko Yamagashi

=== Round 7 ===
18 December 2010	Adelaide United	0–4	Sydney FC	Hindmarsh Stadium, Adelaide
		Report	Khamis 16'; Simon 45', 77'; Ledbrook 53'	Referee: Fusako Kajiyama

18 December 2010	Melbourne Victory	0–1	Perth Glory	AAMI Park, Melbourne
		Report	Kofoed 83'	Referee: Catherine Hofmann

21 December 2010	Brisbane Roar	1–0	Canberra United	Perry Park, Brisbane
	Harch 60'	Report		Referee: Kate Jacewicz

=== Round 8 ===
1 January 2011	Sydney FC	0–1	Brisbane Roar	Campbelltown Stadium, Campbelltown
		Report	Burgess 48'	Referee: Kate Jacewicz

2 January 2011	Newcastle Jets	0–1	Melbourne Victory	Wanderers Oval, Newcastle
		Report	Jackson 47'	Referee: Kirralee Gardiner

=== Round 9 ===
8 January 2011	Melbourne Victory	1–0	Canberra United	Skilled Stadium, Geelong
	Taylor 20'	Report		Attendance: 500; Referee: Stacey Sasopolous

8 January 2011	Newcastle Jets	7–1	Adelaide United	Wanderers Oval, Newcastle
	Feuerriegel 23', 50'; Gunning 46' (o.g.); Andrews 52', 57', 85', 92'	Report	Quigley 34'	Referee: Kirralee Gardiner

9 January 2011	Perth Glory	1–5	Sydney FC	6PR Stadium, Perth
	McCallum 69'	Report	Khamis 3', 8'; Simon 47', 74', 89'	Referee: Kate Jacewicz

=== Round 10 ===
15 January 2011	Adelaide United	1–2	Perth Glory	Hindmarsh Stadium, Adelaide
	Gorry 73'	Report	Kerr 16', 41'	Referee: Catherine Hofmann

15 January 2011	Canberra United	4–1	Newcastle Jets	Deakin Stadium, Canberra
	Munoz 3', 78'; Heyman 19' van Egmond 88'	Summary	Andrews 44'	Referee: Peta McCallum

16 January 2011	Brisbane Roar	0–0	Melbourne Victory	Epping Stadium, Melbourne
		Report		Referee: Kate Jacewicz

=== Round 11 ===
22 January 2011	Brisbane Roar	0–0	Newcastle Jets	Ballymore Stadium, Brisbane
		Report		Referee: Catherine Hofmann

22 January 2011	Sydney FC	3–0	Canberra United	Seymour Shaw Park, Miranda
	Brush 49' (o.g.); Field 76' (o.g.); Simon 82'	Report		Attendance: 973; Referee: Kate Jacewicz

23 January 2011	Perth Glory	1–1	Melbourne Victory	6PR Stadium, Perth
	D'Ovidio 39'	Report	Catley 47'	Referee: Kirralee Gardener

=== Round 12 ===
29 January 2011	Canberra United	1–0	Perth Glory	McKellar Park, Canberra
	A. Sykes 88'	Report		Referee: Kirralee Gardiner

29 January 2011	Newcastle Jets	1–2	Sydney FC	Wanderers Oval, Newcastle
	Crawford 62'	Report	Simon 55'; Uzunlar 73' (pen.)	Referee: Peta McCallum

29 January 2011	Melbourne Victory	2–0	Adelaide United	John Cain Memorial Park, Thornbury
	Catley 1'; Friend 86'	Report		Referee: Catherine Hofmann

== Finals series ==
=== Bracket ===
Semi-finals
1	Sydney FC	5
4	Melbourne Victory	1
2	Brisbane Roar	2 (4)
3	Canberra United	2 (2)

Grand final
1	Sydney FC	1
2	Brisbane Roar	2

=== Semi-finals ===
5 February 2011	Brisbane Roar	2 – 2 (a.e.t.) (4–2 p)	Canberra United	Ballymore Stadium, Brisbane
	Butt 23'; Cordner 96'	Report	Munoz 57'; Heyman 97'	Referee: Jacqui Melksham
	Penalties
	Colthorpe (penalty missed); Carroll (penalty scored); Butt (penalty scored); Kellond-Knight (penalty scored); Dumont (penalty scored)		(penalty scored) Shipard; (penalty missed) Brush; (penalty scored) Cooper; (penalty missed) Perry

6 February 2011	Sydney FC	5–1	Melbourne Victory	Campbelltown Stadium, Campbelltown
	Khamis 26', 75'; Uzunlar 38' (pen.); Simon 74'; Bolger 88'	Report	Catley 30'	Attendance: 912; Referee: Kirralee Gardiner

=== Final ===
12 February 2011	Sydney FC	1–2	Brisbane Roar	Campbelltown Stadium
	Ledbrook 35'	Report	Butt 9'; De Vanna 64'	Attendance: 1,872; Referee: Kate Jacewicz

== Season Statistics ==
=== Leading scorers ===
Total	Player		Team	Goals per Round													
Total	Player		Team	1	2	3	4	5	6	7	8	9	10	11	12	SF	F
12	(Australia)	Kyah Simon	Sydney FC	1	2				1	2		3		1	1	1	
8	(Australia)	Michelle Heyman	Canberra United	3				2	1				1			1	
8	(Australia)	Leena Khamis	Sydney FC			1	1		1	1		2				2	
7	(Australia)	Tara Andrews	Newcastle Jets				2					4	1				
7	(Australia)	Tameka Butt	Brisbane Roar	1	1	1		2								1	1
4	(Australia)	Lisa De Vanna	Brisbane Roar			1	1	1									1
4	(Australia)	Lana Harch	Brisbane Roar	1		2				1							
4	(Australia)	Kylie Ledbrook	Sydney FC		1	1				1							1
4	(Australia)	Caitlin Munoz	Canberra United					1					2			1	
4	(England)	Jodie Taylor	Melbourne Victory		1		2					1					

Goal scored from penalty kick

== Awards ==
- Player of the Year: Kyah Simon, Sydney FC
- Young Player of the Year: Kyah Simon, Sydney FC
- Goalkeeper of the Year: Lydia Williams, Canberra United
- Golden Boot: Kyah Simon, Sydney FC – 12 goals
- Goal of the Year: Heather Garriock, Sydney FC – Round 1, Brisbane Roar v Sydney FC
- Fair Play Award: Melbourne Victory
- Referee of the Year: Kate Jacewicz
- Coach of the Year: Alen Stajcic, Sydney FC

== See also ==
- 2010–11 Adelaide United W-League season
- 2010–11 Sydney FC W-League season
