= Julie Rydahl Bukh =

Danish footballer (born 1982)

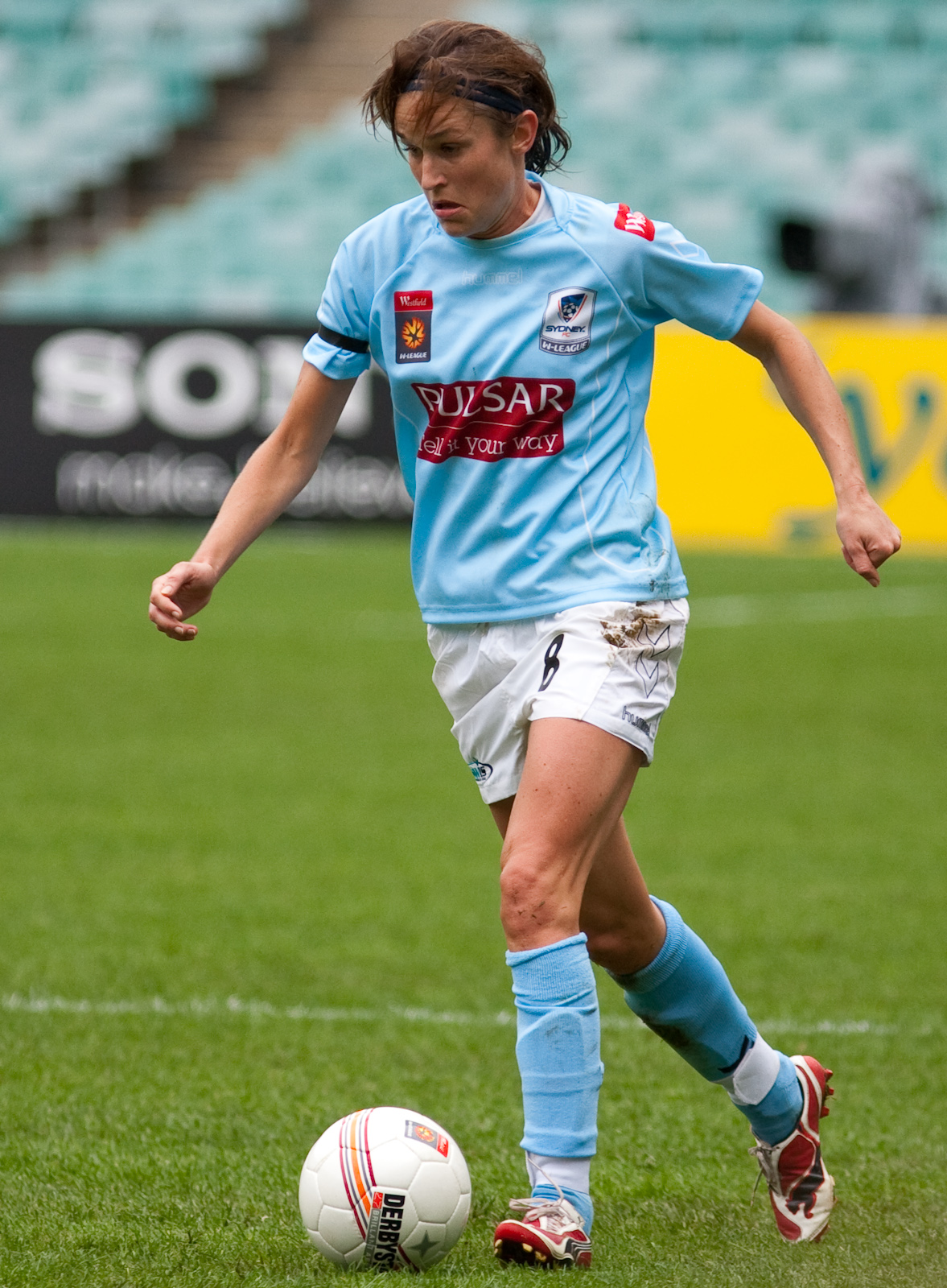

Personal information
- Date of birth: 9 January 1982 (age 44)
- Height: 1.73 m (5 ft 8 in)
- Positions: Winger; attacking midfielder

Youth career
- 1989–1994: Ravnsbjerg IF
- 1995–1996: B67 Viborg

Senior career*
Years	Team	Apps	(Gls)
1997–1999	Viborg FF		
2000–2001	Vejle B		
2001–2008	Brøndby IF		
2009	Linköping	11	(1)
2009	Sydney FC	11	(2)
2010	Fortuna Hjørring		
2010	Pali Blues	3	(2)
2011–2013	Brøndby IF		

International career^{‡}
1998–1999	Denmark U-17	11	(1)
1999–2001	Denmark U-19	11	(2)
2001–2013	Denmark	91	(10)
- * Club domestic league appearances and goals as of 10 June 2010 ‡ National team caps and goals as of 20 April 2017

Julie Rydahl Bukh (born 9 January 1982) is a Danish former football midfielder who most recently played for Brøndby IF and the Denmark national team. As well as teams in her native Denmark, Rydahl Bukh played for clubs in Sweden, Australia, and the United States. She was described by UEFA as a technically gifted and creative left-sided attacking midfielder.

== Club career ==
Rydahl won six successive league championships with Brøndby IF, before moving to Swedish club Linköpings FC alongside her girlfriend Cathrine Paaske in November 2008. She was recovering from a serious knee injury and did not play until March 2009. Rydahl and Paaske left three games before the end of Linköpings' championship-winning season for contracts with Sydney FC in the Australian W-League. Rydahl struck the winning goal in Sydney's 3–2 Grand Final win over Brisbane Roar.

After leaving Sydney FC, Rydahl and Paaske had expected to join the American Women's Professional Soccer (WPS) league, having signed contracts with Los Angeles Sol. When the Sol went into liquidation Rydahl returned to Denmark and joined Brøndby's sworn rivals Fortuna Hjørring instead. In January 2011, she rejoined Brøndby, after a short interlude with Pali Blues.

== International career ==
In March 2001 Rydahl Bukh made her senior international debut against Finland. She scored her first goal in her second appearance, the Danes' 2–1 defeat to Italy in their opening group game at UEFA European Championship 2001.

Injury kept Rydahl Bukh out of UEFA European Championship 2005, but she returned to the team for the 2007 FIFA World Cup and the UEFA European Championship 2009.

She was named in national coach Kenneth Heiner-Møller's Denmark squad for UEFA European Championship 2013. In November 2013 Rydahl Bukh announced that she had retired from football.

== Honours ==
Brøndby IF:

- A-Liga: 2003, 2004, 2005, 2006, 2007, 2008, 2011, 2012, 2013
- Danish Women's Cup: 2004, 2005, 2007, 2011, 2012, 2013

Linköpings FC:

- Damallsvenskan: 2009
- Svenska Cupen: 2009

Sydney FC:

- W-League Premiership: 2009
- W-League Championship: 2009

Fortuna Hjørring:

- A-Liga: 2010
