= 2013 International Women's Club Championship =

2013 mobcast cup International Women's Club Championship
mobcast cup 国際女子サッカークラブ選手権2013

Tournament details
- Host country: Japan
- Dates: 30 November–8 December
- Teams: 5 (from 3 confederations)
- Venues: 3 (in 3 host cities)

Final positions
- Champions: INAC Kobe Leonessa (1st title)
- Runners-up: Chelsea
- Third place: Sydney FC
- Fourth place: Colo Colo

Tournament statistics
- Matches played: 5
- Goals scored: 21 (4.2 per match)
- Attendance: 11,555 (2,311 per match)
- Top scorer(s): Francisca Lara; Beverly Goebel-Yanez; Emi Nakajima; Renee Rollason (2 goals)

The 2013 International Women's Club Championship was the second worldwide international women's football club tournament, and was held in Japan from 30 November–8 December 2013. Five teams, comprising representatives from Europe, Australia, South America, and Asia took part in the competition.

== Participating teams ==
The invited teams were the champions of Europe, Australia, South America, Japan, and the Nadeshiko League Cup. As INAC Kobe Leonessa won both the Japanese Cup and league, the runner-up of the league was also invited. An unidentified team from the United States was also invited but ultimately declined. Wolfsburg, the champions of Europe, also apparently declined, and they were replaced by Chelsea.

Team	Tournament won	Confederation or FA
(England) Chelsea	invitee	UEFA
(Australia) Sydney FC	2012–13 W-League	Football Federation Australia
(Chile) Colo Colo	2012 Copa Libertadores Femenina	CONMEBOL
(Japan) INAC Kobe Leonessa	2013 Nadeshiko League (winner) and 2013 Nadeshiko League Cup	Japan Football Association
(Japan) NTV Beleza	2013 Nadeshiko League (runners-up)	Japan Football Association

== Results ==
Play-off
(Australia) Sydney FC	1
(Japan) NTV Beleza	0

Semi-finals
(England) Chelsea	3
(Australia) Sydney FC	2
(Chile) Colo Colo	0
(Japan) Kobe Leonessa	3

Final
(England) Chelsea	2
(Japan) Kobe Leonessa	4
Third place
(Australia) Sydney FC (p)	3 (4)
(Chile) Colo Colo	3 (2)

=== Play-off ===
30 November 2013
12:30

Sydney FC (Australia)	1–0	(Japan) NTV Beleza
Kete 61'	Report; Summary

Kanko Stadium, Okayama
Attendance: 1,652
Referee: Jung Ji-Young (South Korea)

=== Semifinals ===
4 December 2013
18:00

Colo Colo (Chile)	0–3	(Japan) INAC Kobe Leonessa
	Report (Spanish); Summary	Goebel-Yanez 15'; Kawasumi 39'; Nakajima 61'

Kagoshima Kamoike Stadium, Kagoshima
Attendance: 2,892
Referee: Qin Liang (China)

4 December 2013
18:30

Chelsea (England)	3–2	(Australia) Sydney FC
Coombs 36'; Aluko 52'; Ōgimi 57'	Report; Summary	Rollason 75'; Taylor 81'

Kanko Stadium, Okayama
Attendance: 2,201
Referee: Jung Ji-Young (South Korea)

=== Third place match ===
7 December 2013
13:10

Colo Colo (Chile)	3–3	(Australia) Sydney FC
Ascanio 8'; Lara 86', 88'	Report; Summary	Perry 22'; Camilleri 23'; Rollason 79'
Penalties
Sáez (penalty missed); Lara (penalty scored); C. Soto (penalty missed); Villamayor (penalty scored)	2–4	(penalty scored) Rollason; (penalty missed) Dumont; (penalty scored) Green; (penalty scored) Bolger; (penalty scored) Kerr

Kagoshima Kamoike Stadium, Kagoshima
Attendance: 1,289
Referee: Sachiko Yamagishi (Japan)

=== Final ===
8 December 2013
13:10

INAC Kobe Leonessa (Japan)	4–2	(England) Chelsea
Takase 10'; Goebel-Yanez 28'; Ji So-yun 74'; Nakajima 90'	Report; Summary	Williams 80'; Blundell 83'

Ajinomoto Field Nishigaoka, Tokyo
Attendance: 3,521
Referee: Qin Liang (China)

INAC Kobe Leonessa	Chelsea

GK	1	(Japan) Ayumi Kaihori
DF	2	(Japan) Yukari Kinga
DF	5	(Japan) Junko Kai
DF	25	(Japan) Shiori Miyake
DF	21	(Japan) Ayaka Watanabe
MF	10	(South Korea) Ji So-yun
MF	6	(Japan) Chiaki Minamiyama	(substituted off) 71'
MF	7	(Japan) Emi Nakajima
FW	9	(Japan) Nahomi Kawasumi (c)
FW	17	(United States) Beverly Goebel-Yanez	(substituted off) 76'
FW	11	(Japan) Megumi Takase
Substitutes:
GK	18	(Japan) Rei Takenaka
DF	3	(United States) Rebecca Moros
DF	15	(Japan) Midori Isokane
DF	16	(Japan) Akane Shimizu
DF	22	(Japan) Maho Yamada
MF	8	(Japan) Homare Sawa	(substituted on) 71'
MF	20	(Japan) Yōko Tanaka	(substituted on) 76'
FW	13	(Japan) Ayu Nakada
FW	14	(Japan) Mai Kyōkawa
FW	19	(Japan) Ayaka Michigami
Manager:
(Japan) Takayoshi Ishihara

GK	13	(England) Marie Hourihan
DF	2	(England) Danielle Buet		(substituted off) 88'
DF	6	(England) Laura Bassett
DF	18	(Sweden) Emma Wilhelmsson	(yellow card) 28'
DF	21	(England) Hannah Blundell
MF	12	(United States) Allie Long		(substituted off) 69'
MF	19	(England) Laura Coombs		(substituted off) 82'
MF	8	(England) Rachel Williams
FW	22	(England) Rosella Ayane		(substituted off) 45'
FW	7	(Japan) Yūki Ōgimi (c)
FW	9	(England) Eniola Aluko
Substitutes:
GK	1	(Japan) Mai Konno
DF	15	(England) Meaghan Sargeant		(substituted on) 69'
DF	26	(Northern Ireland) Laura Rafferty		(substituted on) 88'
MF	4	(England) Drew Spence
MF	11	(Japan) Aya Noguchi		(substituted on) 82'
MF	20	(England) Jodie Brett		(substituted on) 45'
Manager:
(England) Emma Hayes

Assistant referees:
Naomi Teshirogi (Japan)
Chie Ohata (Japan)
Fourth official:
Nami Sato (Japan)

== Goalscorers ==
Rank	Scorer	Club	Goals
1	(Chile) Francisca Lara	(Chile) Colo Colo	2
1	(United States) Beverly Goebel-Yanez	(Japan) INAC Kobe Leonessa	2
1	(Japan) Emi Nakajima	(Japan) INAC Kobe Leonessa	2
1	(Australia) Renee Rollason	(Australia) Sydney FC	2
5	(Venezuela) Yusmery Ascanio	(Chile) Colo Colo	1
5	(England) Eniola Aluko	(England) Chelsea	1
5	(England) Hannah Blundell	(England) Chelsea	1
5	(England) Laura Coombs	(England) Chelsea	1
5	(England) Rachel Williams	(England) Chelsea	1
5	(Japan) Yūki Ōgimi	(England) Chelsea	1
5	(South Korea) Ji So-Yun	(Japan) INAC Kobe Leonessa	1
5	(Japan) Nahomi Kawasumi	(Japan) INAC Kobe Leonessa	1
5	(Japan) Megumi Takase	(Japan) INAC Kobe Leonessa	1
5	(Australia) Trudy Camilleri	(Australia) Sydney FC	1
5	(New Zealand) Emma Kete	(Australia) Sydney FC	1
5	(Australia) Ellyse Perry	(Australia) Sydney FC	1
5	(England) Jodie Taylor	(Australia) Sydney FC	1

== Prize-pool ==
The total prize-pool was $100,000:

- 1st $60,000
- 2nd $30,000
- 3rd $10,000
