= Alli Lipsher =

American soccer player

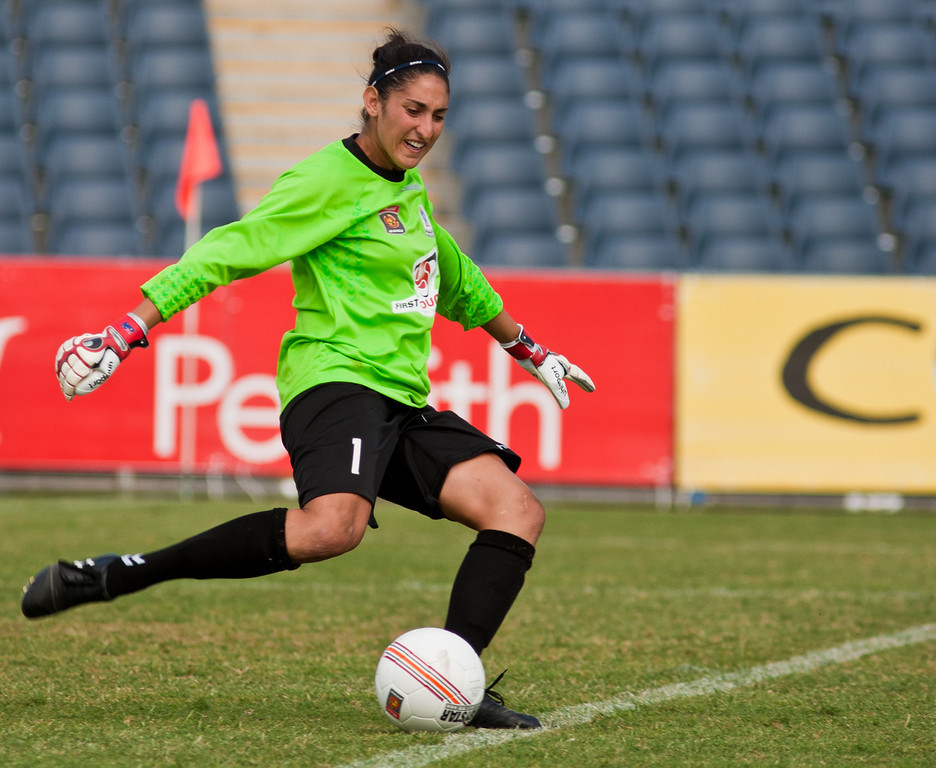
- Lipsher playing for the Newcastle Jets in 2010

Personal information
- Full name: Allison Shelby Lipsher
- Date of birth: January 24, 1986 (age 40)
- Place of birth: Honolulu, Hawaii, U.S.
- Height: 5 ft 9 in (1.75 m)
- Position: Goalkeeper

Team information
- Current team: Kansas City (goalkeeper coach)

Youth career
- 1998–2004: Honolulu Bulls

College career
| Years | Team | Apps | (Gls) |
| 2004–2007 | Duke Blue Devils | | |

Senior career*
| Years | Team | Apps | (Gls) |
| 2007 | Cocoa Expos | 2 | (0) |
| 2008 | Ajax America | | |
| 2009–2010 | Boston Breakers | 11 | (0) |
| 2010–2011 | → Newcastle Jets (loan) | 9 | (0) |
| 2011 | Atlanta Beat | 7 | (0) |
| 2011–2012 | Sydney FC | 10 | (0) |
- * Club domestic league appearances and goals as of October 8, 2015

Allison Shelby Lipsher (born January 24, 1986) is an American soccer coach and former player who played as a goalkeeper. Lipsher is currently the goalkeeper coach of Kansas City in the National Women's Soccer League (NWSL).
