= Cathrine Paaske =

Danish footballer (born 1978)

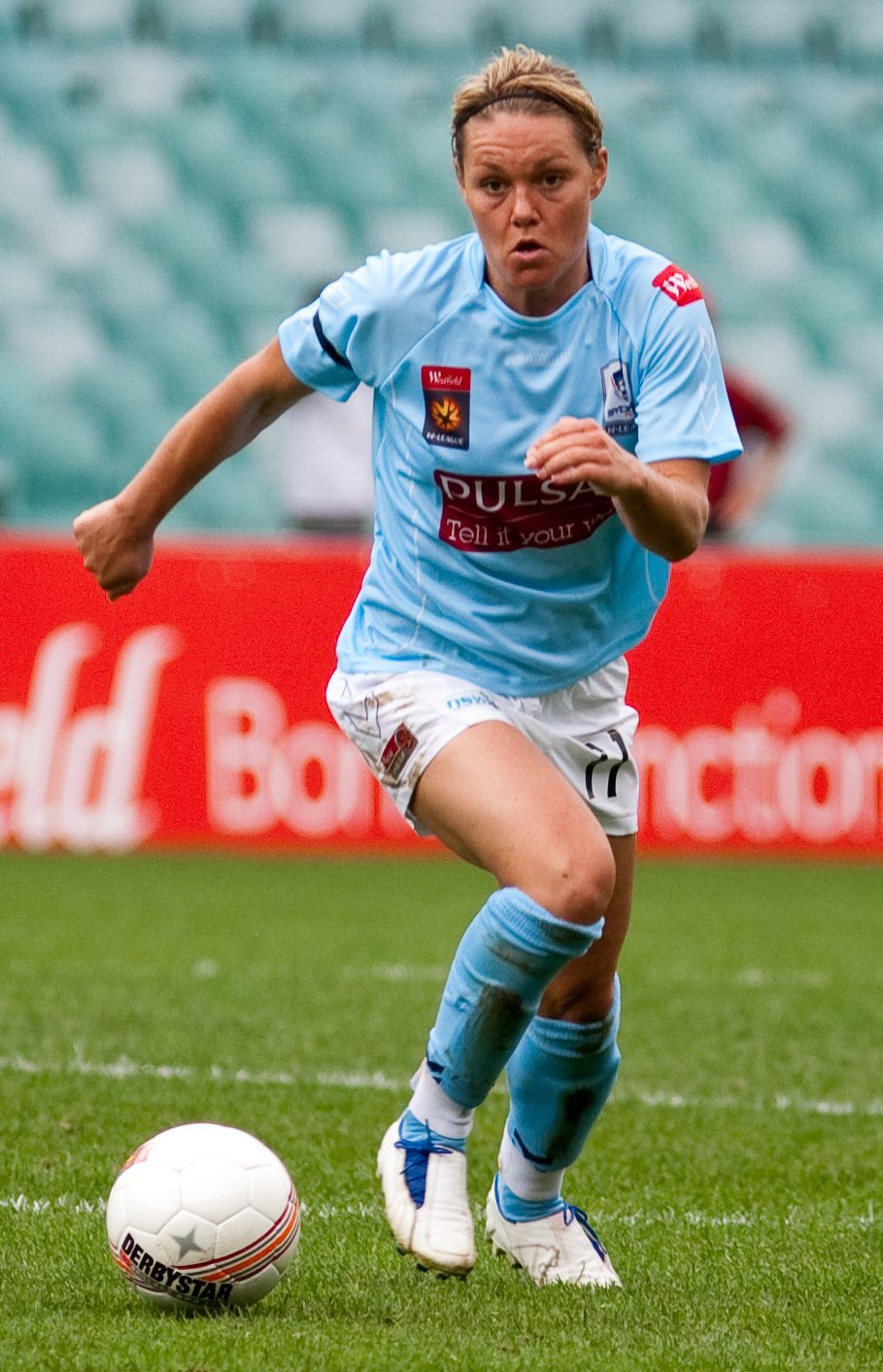
- Cathrine Paaske Sørensen in 2009

Personal information
- Full name: Cathrine Paaske Sørensen
- Date of birth: 14 June 1978 (age 48)
- Position: Midfielder

Senior career*
Years	Team	Apps	(Gls)
–1996	B1921		
1997	Rødovre BK		
1998–2001	Hillerød G&IF		
2001–2008	Brøndby IF		
2009	Linköpings FC		
2009–2010	Sydney FC	12	(2)
2010	Pali Blues	5	(2)
2010	Fortuna Hjørring		

International career^{‡}
2000–2010	Denmark	121	(36)
- * Club domestic league appearances and goals as of 10 June 2010 ‡ National team caps and goals as of 5 October 2012

Cathrine Paaske Sørensen (born 14 June 1978) is a Danish former football midfielder who played for the Denmark women's national football team. She was signed to play for the Los Angeles Sol of the American Women's Professional Soccer league, but the team folded in February 2010. She then joined the two-time W-League champion Pali Blues, based in Los Angeles, for the 2010 season.

A two time Danish Player of the Year, Paaske Sørensen retired from football in 2010 to become a nurse.

== Honours ==
With Sydney FC:

- W-League Premiership: 2009
- W-League Championship: 2009
