= Brittany Whitfield =

Australian soccer player

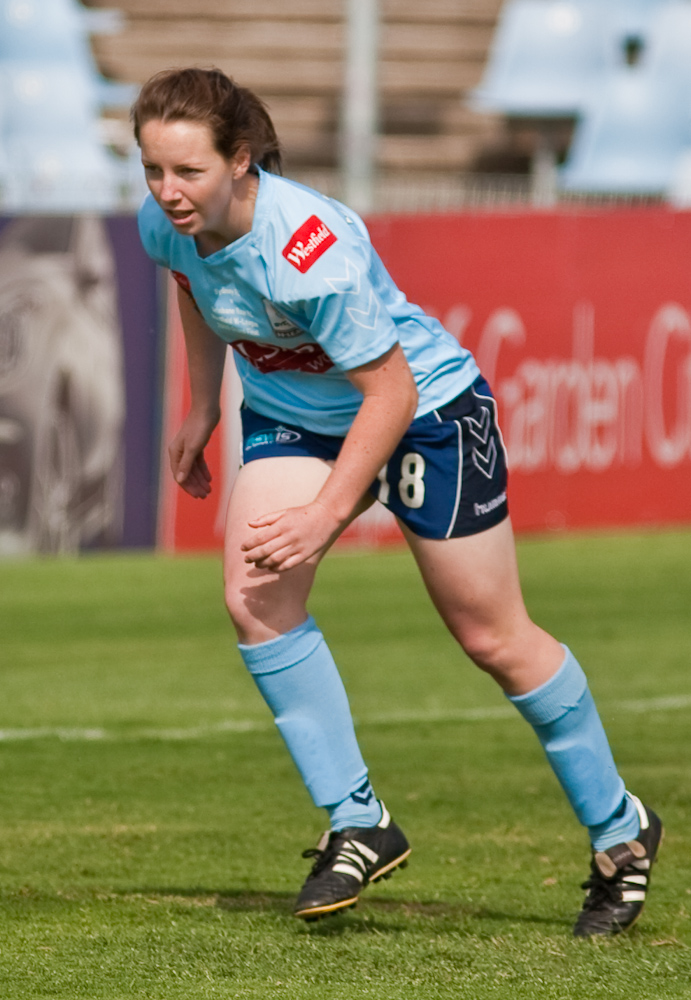
- Whitfield playing for Sydney FC in 2009

Personal information
- Date of birth: 17 February 1994 (age 32)
- Place of birth: Brisbane, Australia
- Position: Midfielder

Team information
- Current team: Peninsula Power

Senior career*
Years	Team	Apps	(Gls)
2009–2013	Sydney FC	15	(1)
2013-	Peninsula Power FC	13	(21)
- * Club domestic league appearances and goals as of 6 December 2020

Brittany Whitfield (born 17 February 1994) is an Australian football (soccer) player, who played for Sydney FC in the Australian W-League.

== Honours ==
With Sydney FC:

- (Australia) W-League Premiership: 2009
- (Australia) W-League Championship: 2009

== Peninsula Power FC Women ==
In 2013 Whitfield scored 6 goals in 4 matches in the SEQ diamond league and in 2020 was the golden boot winner with 15 goals in the Brisbane Women's Premier League.

== Personal life ==
Until the age of nine, Whitfield played softball primarily. A friend's football team was short of a player and she was asked to deputise, after which she switched focus to football. She had a scholarship at the Queensland Academy of Sport.
