= Renee Rollason =

Australian soccer player

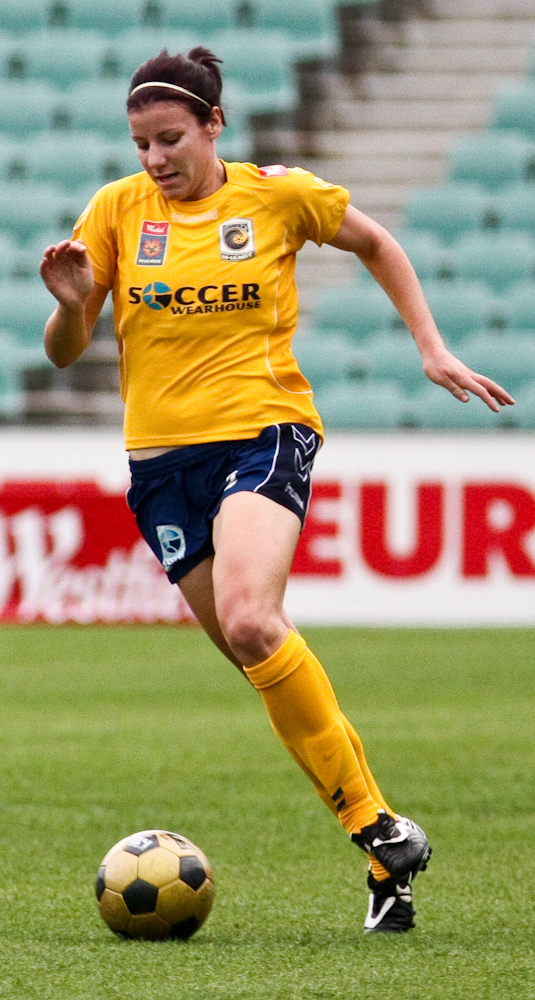
- Rollason playing for Central Coast Mariners in 2008

Personal information
- Full name: Renee Rollason
- Date of birth: 22 September 1989 (age 37)
- Place of birth: Bega, Australia
- Height: 1.74 m (5 ft 9 in)
- Position: Midfielder

Youth career
- 2004–2008: NSW Sapphires

Senior career*
Years	Team	Apps	(Gls)
2008–2010	Central Coast Mariners	21	(3)
2010–2016	Sydney FC	68	(14)

International career^{‡}
2007	Australia U-20	4	(0)
2007–	Australia	8	(4)
- * Club domestic league appearances and goals as of 13 September 2016 ‡ National team caps and goals as of 12 July 2010

Renee Rollason (born 22 September 1989) is an Australian footballer who last played for Sydney FC in the Australian W-League.

Rollason made her W-League debut playing for the Central Coast Mariners against Melbourne Victory on Saturday, 25 October 2008. Rollason then made her scoring debut in Round 2 against Perth Glory, scoring a double to assist the Mariners to a 3–1 win at home.

In 2013, Rollason was part of Sydney FC's squad for the International Women's Club Championship. She scored two goals, thus becoming joint-top scorer for the tournament. She also converted a penalty in the successful penalty shoot-out in the 3rd place match.

== Career statistics ==
=== International goals ===
Scores and results list Australia's goal tally first.

#	Date	Venue	Opponent	Score	Result	Competition
1	4 August 2007	Mong Kok Stadium, Kowloon, Hong Kong	Hong Kong	2–0	8–1	2008 Olympics qualifying
2	4 August 2007	Mong Kok Stadium, Kowloon, Hong Kong	Hong Kong	6–1	8–1	2008 Olympics qualifying
3	11 October 2008	Thanh Long Sports Centre, Ho Chi Minh City, Vietnam	Philippines	1–0	7–0	2008 AFF Women's Championship
4	11 October 2008	Thanh Long Sports Centre, Ho Chi Minh City, Vietnam	Philippines	3–0	7–0	2008 AFF Women's Championship

== Honours ==
=== Club ===
Sydney FC

- W-League Championship: 2012–13
- W-League Premiership: 2010–11

=== Country ===
Australia

- AFF Women's Championship: 2008
