= Danielle Brogan =

Australian soccer player

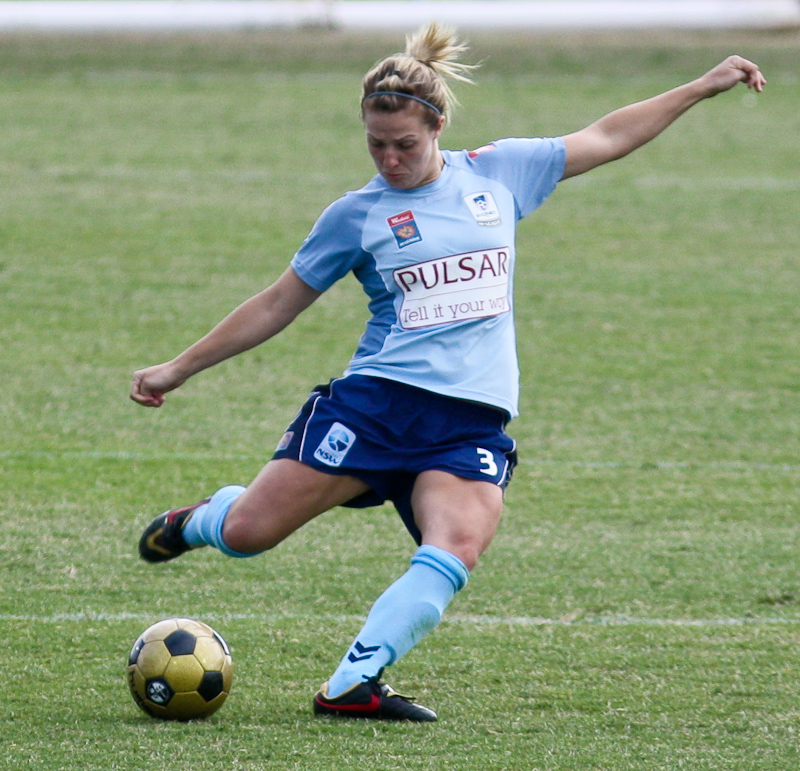
- Brogan playing for Sydney FC in 2008

Personal information
- Full name: Danielle Jade Brogan
- Date of birth: 28 June 1988 (age 38)
- Place of birth: Sydney, Australia
- Height: 1.68 m (5 ft 6 in)
- Position: Defender

Senior career*
Years	Team	Apps	(Gls)
2003–2004	NSW Sapphires	13	(0)
2008–2014	Sydney FC	42	(0)
2014	Notts County	9	(0)
2014–2015	Adelaide United	7	(0)
2015–2016	Perth Glory	8	(0)
2017–2018	Perth Glory	6	(0)

International career^{‡}
2004–2006	Australia U-20	10	(1)
2009–2015	Australia	7	(0)
- * Club domestic league appearances and goals as of 20 February 2018 ‡ National team caps and goals as of 3 October 2016

Danielle Jade Brogan (born 28 June 1988) is an Australian former soccer player who played in Australia and England. She played in Australia for Sydney FC, Adelaide United FC and Perth Glory in the Australian W-League. In England, Brogan played nine times for Notts County. At international level she represented Australia at both under-age and full international level. Brogan played seven times for Australia between 2009 and 2015.

== Playing career ==
=== Club career ===
==== NSW Sapphires ====
Brogan played 12 times for the New South Wales Sapphires in the Women's National Soccer League.

==== Notts County ====
Brogan signed for Notts County in the Women's Super League early in the 2014 season.

==== Perth Glory ====
In 2015, Brogan signed for Perth Glory.

After 18 months not playing, Brogan returned to soccer, signing again with Perth Glory.

=== International career ===
Brogan represented Australia at the 2004 FIFA World Under 19 Women's Championship in Thailand and at the 2006 edition in Russia.

Brogan played her first match for Australia in 2009, in a match against Italy in Sydney. Overall, she played seven times for Australia, with her last match being in 2015.

== Honours ==
=== Club ===
NSW Sapphires:

- Women's National Soccer League Championship: 2003

Sydney FC:

- W-League Premiership: 2009, 2010–11
- W-League Championship: 2009
