= Teigen Allen =

Australian soccer player (born 1994)

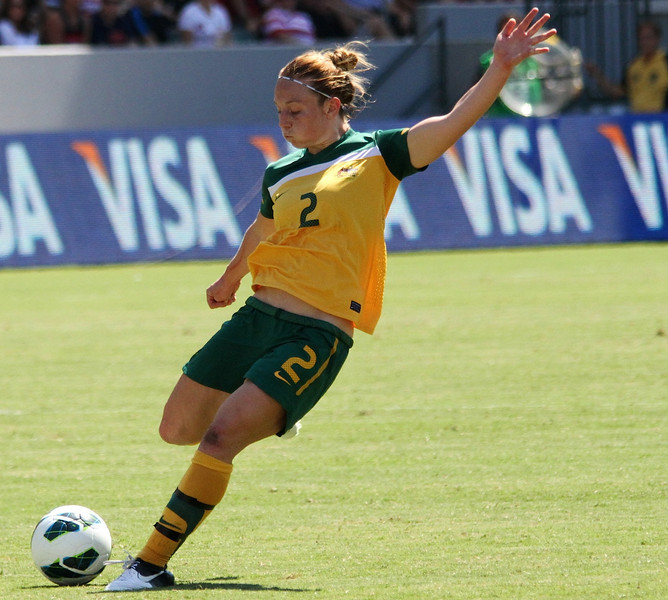
- Allen playing against the United States in September 2012

Personal information
- Full name: Teigen Jacqueline Allen
- Date of birth: 12 February 1994 (age 32)
- Place of birth: Sydney, Australia
- Height: 1.68 m (5 ft 6 in)
- Position: Defender

Senior career*
Years	Team	Apps	(Gls)
2009–2012	Sydney FC	28	(0)
2012–2014	Western Sydney Wanderers	21	(1)
2014	Western New York Flash	4	(0)
2014–2016	Sydney FC	25	(0)
2016–2017	Melbourne City	13	(0)
2017	Vålerenga	4	(0)
2017–2018	Sydney FC	4	(0)
2018–2020	Melbourne Victory	21	(0)
2020–2021	Melbourne City	6	(0)
2021–2022	Western Sydney Wanderers	10	(0)
2022–2023	Newcastle Jets	15	(0)

International career^{‡}
2008–2010	Australia U17	32	
2009–2013	Australia U20	25	
2010–2023	Australia	40	(0)
- * Club domestic league appearances and goals as of 29 November 2020 ‡ National team caps and goals as of 6 March 2019

Teigen Jacqueline Allen (born 12 February 1994) is a retired Australian soccer player who played for Sydney FC, Western Sydney Wanderers, Melbourne City, Melbourne Victory, and Newcastle Jets in the Australian A-League Women, for the Western New York Flash in the American National Women's Soccer League, for Vålerenga in the Norwegian Toppserien, and for the Australia women's national soccer team.

== Early career ==
Allen began her football at the early age of 3 at a local club Lakemba lions and Emu Plains until she took the next step in her career playing for Nepean which later became Penrith Nepean United in Western Sydney. After five years with the club her defensive talent was scouted by Alan Stajic where she earned a Scholarship with NSWIS and signed her first professional contract at Sydney FC.

=== NSWIS and AIS ===
In 2008, Allen earned a scholarship with New South Wales Institute of Sport. She earned her scholarship with the Australian Institute of Sport in 2009 and she still holds it currently.

== Club career ==
=== Sydney FC, 2009–2012 ===
Allen was 15 years of age when she started playing for the professional Australian W league Sydney Fc

=== Western Sydney Wanderers, 2013–2014 ===
Allen was one of three players along with Catherine Cannuli and Servet Uzunlar, to become the first women to ever sign multi-year contracts in the W-League.

=== Western New York Flash, 2014 ===
On 9 June 2014, Allen was acquired by the WNY Flash of the Women's National Soccer League in the United States. WNY Flash defender Australian International Teigen Allen subbed in, marking her debut in the WNY Flash vs Seattle Reign on 22 June at Sahlen's Stadium. She was waived by the Western New York Flash in September 2014.

=== Return to Sydney FC, 2014–2016 ===
On 29 August 2014, Allen signed with Sydney FC returning to her original home club, with two others Kyah Simon, Servet Uzunlar where all three will once again line up for the two time premiers after departing the Western Sydney Wanderers.

=== Melbourne City, 2016–2017 ===
In September 2016, Allen joined Melbourne City. Melbourne City FC have become the first W-League Champions to go back-to-back after defeating Perth Glory 2–0 in the 2017 W-League Grand Final:

=== Vålerenga, 2017 ===
On 31 December 2016, Vålerenga signed Allen from Melbourne City. The sports director Egil Ødegaard said she will affect the Norwegian top-flight in 2017.

=== Second return to Sydney FC, 2017–2018. ===
Allen joined Sydney FC once again ahead of the 2017–18 season.

=== Melbourne Victory, 2018–2020 ===
Teigen Allen signed with Melbourne Victory for the 2018–19 W-League season. Melbourne Victory coach Jeff Hopkins praised Allen's work ethic and experience beyond expected for her age in announcing Allen's hiring.

=== Return to Melbourne City, 2020–2021 ===
In November 2020, Allen returned to Melbourne City.

=== Return to Western Sydney Wanderers, 2021–2022 ===
In August 2021, Allen returned to Western Sydney Wanderers for the 2021–22 W-League season.

=== Newcastle Jets, 2022–2023 ===
In September 2022, Allen joined Newcastle Jets for the 2022–23 A-League Women season.

In March 2023, Allen announced her retirement.

== International career ==
On 29 January 2008, at 13 years old, Allen played her first international with the Australian under 17's against USA at North Harbour Stadium, Auckland, New Zealand In 2009, at only 14 years of age, Allen was selected to compete at the AFC Under-19 Women's Championship. The Australians were knocked out after the group stages; however an impressive performance from Allen saw her become one of the key figures in the Australian under-16 team that won the AFC Under-16 Women's Championship later that year The Australians were knocked out after the group stages; however an impressive performance from Allen saw her become one of the key figures in the Australian under 16's

Allen competed in the 2009 AFC Women's Championship with the Young Matildas. for the 2009 AFF U16 Women's Championship in Myanmar.

In 2010, Allen was named in the Matildas team to play in the 2010 AFC Women's Asian Cup, which the squad went on to win. Allen made her international Senior debut as a 15-year-old in the opening game again Vietnam

At the 2011 FIFA Women's World Cup in Germany, Allen was one of the youngest players in the squad. 2012 saw Allen continue cementing her place in the Matildas squad in their attempt to qualify for the 2012 London Olympics. The Australians finished third in the qualification tournament in Jinan, China, coming from behind to defeat South Korea

In May 2014, Allen competed at the AFC Women's Asian Cup and helped Australia to finish second, thereby qualifying for the 2015 FIFA Women's World Cup. She was reported as "almost unstoppable so far and virtually flawless every minute she plays."

== Honours ==
Melbourne Victory

- W League Premiership 2018–19

Melbourne City FC

- W-League Championship:

Sydney FC

- W-League Premiership: 2009
- W-League Championship: 2009

Australia U16

- AFF U-16 Women's Championship: 2009

Australia

- AFC Women's Asian Cup Winners: 2010
- 2019 Cup of Nations

Individual

- 2009: Teigen Allen (Soccer) – Sydney Combined Press Sports person of the Year

== See also ==
- Women's association football in Australia
