= 2009 W-League (Australia) =

Second season of the top women's football (soccer) league in Australia

W-League 2009
- League: W-League
- Sport: Women's association football
- Duration: 3 October – 19 December 2009
- Teams: 8
- TV partner: ABC1

W-League season
- Champions: Sydney FC
- Premiers: Sydney FC
- Top scorer: Michelle Heyman (11)

W-League seasons
- ← 2008–09 2010–11 →

The 2009 W-League season was the second season of the W-League, the Australian national women's football (soccer) competition. The season was played over 10 rounds followed by a finals series. Sydney FC were both the champions and premiers after finishing the regular season at the top of the table and defeating Brisbane Roar 3–2 in the grand final.

== Clubs ==
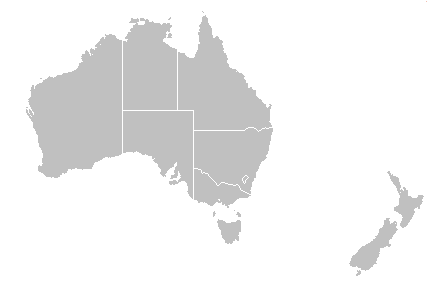

W-League teams for the 2009 season:

Team	City	Years in competition
Adelaide United	(South Australia) Adelaide, SA	2008–09 – present
Brisbane Roar	(Queensland) Brisbane, Qld	2008–09 – present
Canberra United	(Australian Capital Territory) Canberra, ACT	2008–09 – present
Central Coast Mariners	(New South Wales) Gosford, NSW	2008–09 – 2009
Melbourne Victory	(Victoria (state)) Melbourne, Vic	2008–09 – present
Newcastle Jets	(New South Wales) Newcastle, NSW	2008–09 – present
Perth Glory	(Western Australia) Perth, WA	2008–09 – present
Sydney FC	(New South Wales) Sydney, NSW	2008–09 – present

=== Foreign players ===
Club	Visa 1	Visa 2	Visa 3	Non-Visa foreigner(s)	Former player(s)
Adelaide United					
Brisbane Roar					
Canberra United	(Chinese Taipei) Lin Chiung-ying	(Chinese Taipei) Tseng Shu-o			
Central Coast Mariners	(United States) Kendall Fletcher	(United States) Jillian Loyden	(United States) Lydia Vandenbergh		
Melbourne Victory	(Canada) Katie Thorlakson	(New Zealand) Marlies Oostdam	(United States) Julianne Sitch	(Turkey) Gülcan Koca^{A}	
Newcastle Jets	(England) Kirstyn Pearce			(England) Stacey Day^{B}	
Perth Glory	(United States) Alex Singer			(Wales) Carys Hawkins^{A}	
Sydney FC	(Denmark) Cathrine Paaske Sørensen	(Denmark) Julie Rydahl Bukh			

The following do not fill a Visa position:
^{A} Australian citizens who have chosen to represent another national team;
^{B} Those players who were born and started their professional career abroad but have since gained Australian citizenship;
^{G} Guest players;
^{R} Injury replacement players, or national team replacement players;

== Regular season ==
The 2009 W-League season was played over 10 rounds, followed by a finals series involving the four highest placed teams, starting in October and completing in December 2009.

=== League table ===
Pos	Team	Pld	W	D	L	GF	GA	GD	Pts	Qualification
1	Sydney FC (C)	10	7	2	1	25	10	+15	23	Qualification to Finals series
2	Central Coast Mariners	10	7	1	2	24	7	+17	22	Qualification to Finals series
3	Brisbane Roar	10	6	3	1	24	7	+17	21	Qualification to Finals series
4	Canberra United	10	4	2	4	17	12	+5	14	Qualification to Finals series
5	Melbourne Victory	10	4	2	4	9	10	−1	14	
6	Perth Glory	10	4	1	5	11	22	−11	13	
7	Adelaide United	10	0	3	7	7	31	−24	3	
8	Newcastle Jets	10	0	2	8	7	25	−18	2	

Source: au.soccerway.com
Rules for classification: 1) points; 2) goal difference; 3) number of goals scored.
(C) Champions

=== Fixtures ===
Individual matches are collated at each club's season article.

== Finals series ==
=== Bracket ===
Semi-finals
1	Sydney FC	3
4	Canberra United	0
2	Central Coast Mariners	0
3	Brisbane Roar	1

Grand Final
1	Sydney FC	3
3	Brisbane Roar	2

=== Semi-finals ===
12 December 2009	Sydney FC	3–0	Canberra United	Toyota Stadium
	Walsh 45'; Khamis 61'; Garriock 84'	Report; Summary		Referee: Casey Reibelt

13 December 2009	Central Coast Mariners	0–1	Brisbane Roar	Bluetongue Stadium
		Report; Summary	Reuter 61'	Referee: Kirralee Gardener

=== Final ===
19 December 2009	Sydney FC	3–2	Brisbane Roar	Toyota Stadium
	O'Neill 66'; Walsh 73'; Rydahl 78'	Summary	Harch 15'; Butt 90+3' (pen.)	Attendance: 1,439; Referee: Kate Jacewicz

== Season statistics ==
=== Leading scorers ===
Total	Player		Team	Goals per Round									
Total	Player		Team	1	2	3	4	5	6	7	8	9	10
11	(Australia)	Michelle Heyman	Central Coast Mariners	2			2		1	3	2	1	
7	(Australia)	Leena Khamis	Sydney FC			1		1		1	2	1	1
6	(Australia)	Sarah Walsh	Sydney FC	1	1			2			1	1	
5	(Australia)	Racheal Quigley	Adelaide United						2		1	2	
5	(Australia)	Tameka Butt	Brisbane Roar	1							1		3
4	(United States)	Lydia Vandenbergh	Central Coast Mariners				1		1	1		1	
4	(United States)	Kendall Fletcher	Central Coast Mariners				1	1		1		1	
4	(Australia)	Courtney Beutel	Brisbane Roar	2				1				1	
4	(Chinese Taipei)	Tseng Shu-o	Canberra United			1	2				1		
4	(Australia)	Ellie Brush	Canberra United		1			1		1			1

Goal scored from penalty kick

== Awards ==
- Player of the Year: Michelle Heyman, Central Coast Mariners
- Young Player of the Year: Elise Kellond-Knight, Brisbane Roar and Ellyse Perry, Canberra United
- Player's Player of the Year: Samantha Kerr, Perth Glory
- Goalkeeper of the Year: Jillian Loyden, Central Coast Mariners
- Golden Boot: Michelle Heyman, Central Coast Mariners – 11 goals
- Goal of the Year: Samantha Kerr, Perth Glory – Round 8 (Perth Glory v Sydney FC)
- Fair Play Award: Sydney FC and Canberra United
- Referee of the Year: Kate Jacewicz
- Coach of the Year: Ray Junna, Canberra United and Stephen Roche, Central Coast Mariners

== See also ==
- Adelaide United W-League season 2009
- Brisbane Roar W-League season 2009
- Canberra United W-League season 2009
- Central Coast Mariners W-League season 2009
- Melbourne Victory W-League season 2009
- Newcastle Jets W-League season 2009
- Perth Glory W-League season 2009
- Sydney FC W-League season 2009
