= Kylie Ledbrook =

Australian soccer player

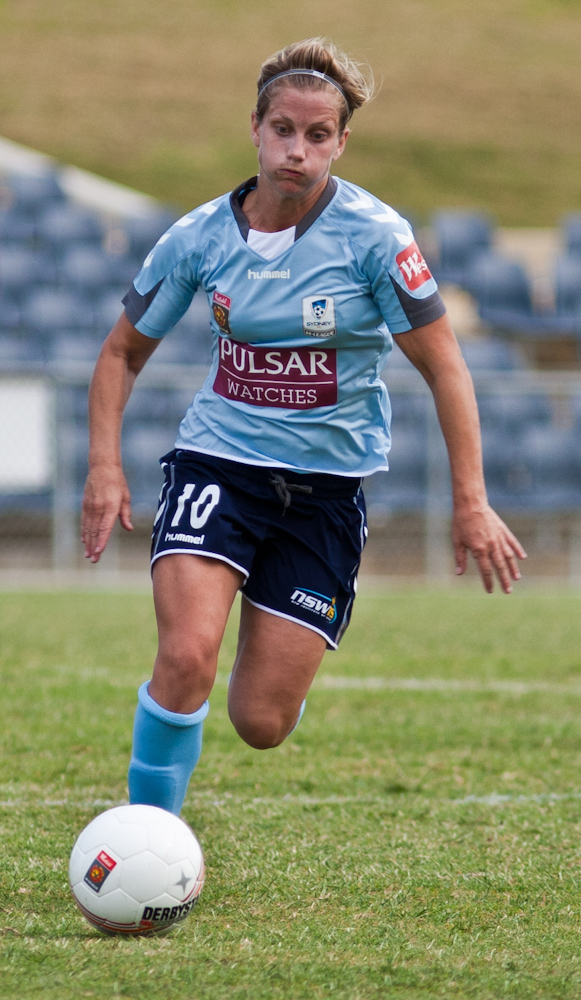
- Ledbrook playing for Sydney FC in 2010

Personal information
- Full name: Kylie Ledbrook
- Date of birth: 20 March 1986 (age 40)
- Place of birth: Sydney, Australia
- Height: 1.59 m (5 ft 3 in)
- Position: Midfielder

Team information
- Current team: Western Sydney Wanderers
- Number: 10

Senior career*
| Years | Team | Apps | (Gls) |
| 2008–2013 | Sydney FC | 47 | (11) |
| 2017–2018 | Sydney FC | 13 | (6) |
| 2018– | Western Sydney Wanderers | 10 | (3) |

International career^{‡}
| 2004–2006 | Australia U-20 | 16 | (13) |
| 2004–2011 | Australia | 19 | (1) |
- * Club domestic league appearances and goals as of 21 February 2018 ‡ National team caps and goals as of 3 July 2011

Kylie Ledbrook (born 20 March 1986) is an Australian soccer player, who plays for Western Sydney Wanderers in the Australian W-League.

== Club career ==
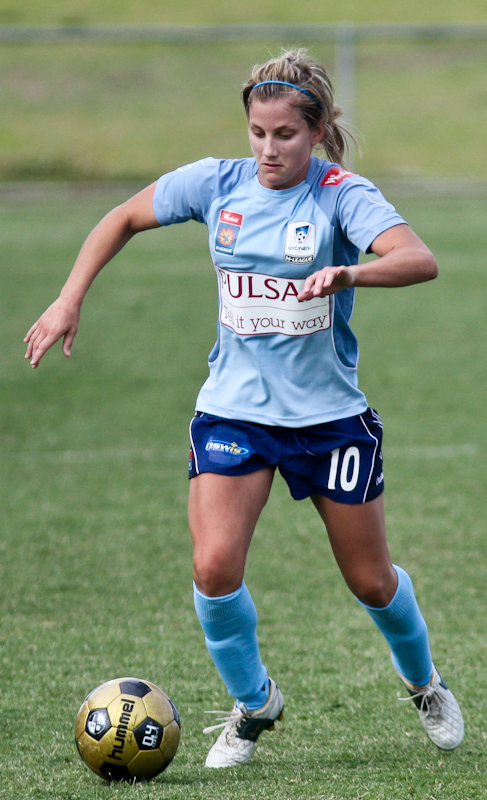
Ledbrook playing for Sydney FC

In 2013 Ledbrook retired from professional football to start a family and set up her career off the field. After playing with the Macarthur Rams in the NSW NPLW she decided to return to the W-League.

=== Sydney FC, 2017-2018 ===
On 15 October 2017, Ledbrook returned to Sydney FC after being absent from the W-League since 2013. She appeared in 13 matches for Sydney and scored 6 goals. Sydney made it all the way to the 2018 W-League Grand Final where they lost 2–0 to Melbourne City.

=== Western Sydney Wanderers, 2018-present ===
On 23 August 2018 Ledbrook signed with the Western Sydney Wanderers for the 2018–19 W-League Season. She was one of several players who made the move from Sydney FC to the rival club Western Sydney Wanderers.

== International career ==
She has represented Australia at the 2004 FIFA World Under 19 Women's Championship, 2004 Olympics, 2006 and 2010 AFC Women's Asian Cup and the 2006 FIFA World Under 20 Women's Championship.

== Career statistics ==
=== International goals ===
| # | Date | Venue | Opponent | Score | Result | Competition |
|---|---|---|---|---|---|---|
| 1 | 19 May 2010 | Chengdu Sports Centre, Chengdu, China | Vietnam | 2–0 | 2–0 | 2010 AFC Women's Asian Cup |

== Honours ==
=== Club ===
Sydney FC:

- W-League Premiership: 2009, 2011–12
- W-League Championship: 2009

=== Country ===
Australia

- AFC Women's Asian Cup: 2010
- OFC U-20 Women's Championship: 2004
