= Servet Uzunlar =

Australian footballer (born 1989)

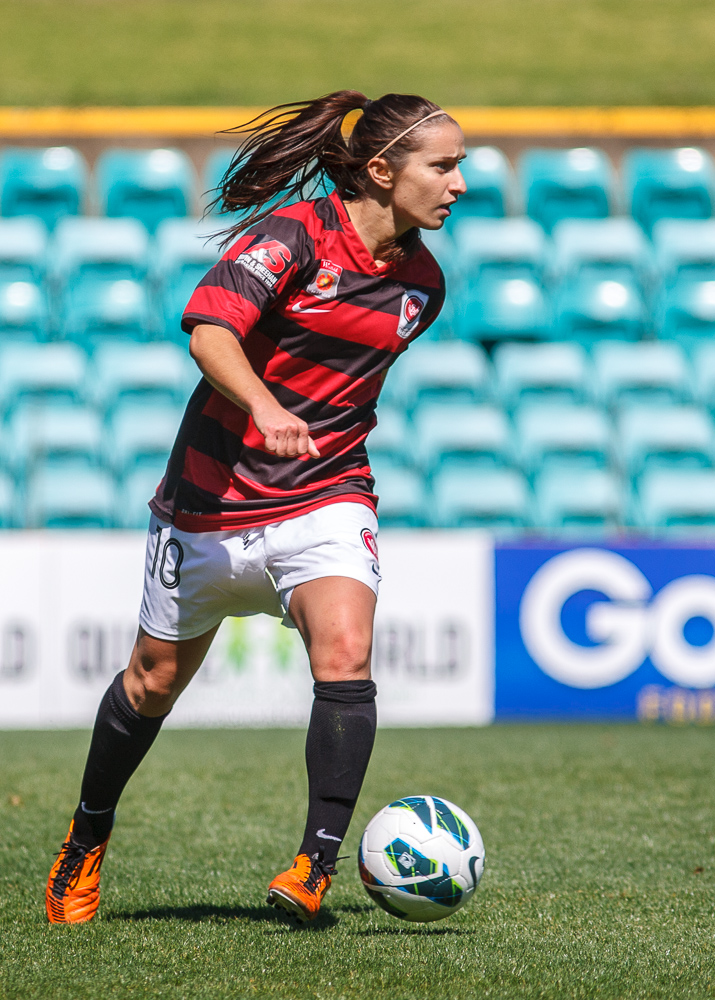
- Uzunlar playing for the Western Sydney Wanderers

Personal information
- Full name: Yesim Servet Uzunlar
- Date of birth: 8 March 1989 (age 37)
- Place of birth: Sydney, Australia
- Height: 1.61 m (5 ft 3 in)
- Positions: Centre-back; defensive midfielder

Youth career
- 2004–2008: NSW Sapphires

Senior career*
Years	Team	Apps	(Gls)
2008–2012	Sydney FC	42	(3)
2010	Ottawa Fury		
2012–2014	Western Sydney Wanderers	15	(3)
2013	Chungbuk Sportstoto		
2014–2015	Sydney FC	13	(0)
2016–2017	Sydney FC	9	(0)
2018–2019	Western Sydney Wanderers	9	(0)

International career^{‡}
2006–2007	Australia U-20	13	(4)
2008–	Australia	48	(2)
- * Club domestic league appearances and goals as of 27 October 2017 ‡ National team caps and goals as of 30 June 2015

Yesim Servet Uzunlar, known as Servet Uzunlar, (born 8 March 1989) is an Australian soccer player who most recently played for the Western Sydney Wanderers in the Australian W-League competition in the 2018–19 season, and with the Northern Tigers in the National Premier Leagues NSW Women's competition.

== Background ==
She was born in 1989 in Sydney to Turkish Australians Nilgün and Bulant Uzunlar.

== Club career ==
Uzunlar played junior football for North Sutherland Rockets. The club now presents an annual award in her name to junior girls players who have improved their game over the year.

Uzunlar played for NSW Sapphires in the Women's National Soccer League (WNSL) in 2004.

Ahead of the 2008–09 W-League season, Uzunlar joined Sydney FC.

In 2010, she played with the Ottawa Fury.

Uzunlar signed for Californian team Pali Blues for the 2012 USL W-League season.

In October 2012, Uzunlar moved to Western Sydney Wanderers.

She scored the first goal in Western Sydney Wanderers history. In fact she scored the first two.

On 20 October 2012 against Adelaide United, the Wanderers played their maiden W-League game, with Uzunlar scoring in the sixth and 21st minutes.

Mark Bridge scored the Wanderer’s A-League team’s first goal a week later, meaning Uzunlar’s first goal was the club’s first ever goal.

After an ill-fated spell in Korea with Chungbuk Sportstoto, Uzunlar retired from football in 2013 at the age of 25. After a year out of the sport, she rejoined Sydney FC with the aim of playing in the 2015 FIFA Women's World Cup.

In October 2017, it was confirmed that Sydney FC had not re-signed Uzunlar for the 2017–18 W-League season, and after a year off she signed with the Western Sydney Wanderers for the 2018–19 W-League season, returning to the club that she played for from 2012 to 2014.

She won the Wanderers Medal as the team’s Best & Fairest winner, adding to her 2012/13 award.

She played 24 games overall for the Red & Black.

=== International career ===
Uzunlar was a member of the Australian squads that played at the 2006 FIFA U-20 Women's World Championship and the 2008 FIFA U-20 Women's World Cup. She made her senior debut for Australia in 2008, in a 5–0 loss to China.

At the 2011 FIFA Women's World Cup, she played every minute of Australia's four games.

She was named to Australia's 23-player squad for the 2015 Women's World Cup, she appeared in one game as Australia was eliminated in the quarter-finals.

== International goals ==
Scores and results list Australia's goal tally first.

#	Date	Venue	Opponent	Score	Result	Competition
1	18 October 2008	Thanh Long Sports Centre, Ho Chi Minh City, Vietnam	Myanmar	2–0	5–1	2008 AFF Women's Championship
2	20 November 2012	Bao'an Stadium, Shenzhen, China	Chinese Taipei	5–0	7–0	2013 EAFF Women's East Asian Cup preliminary round 2

== Honours ==
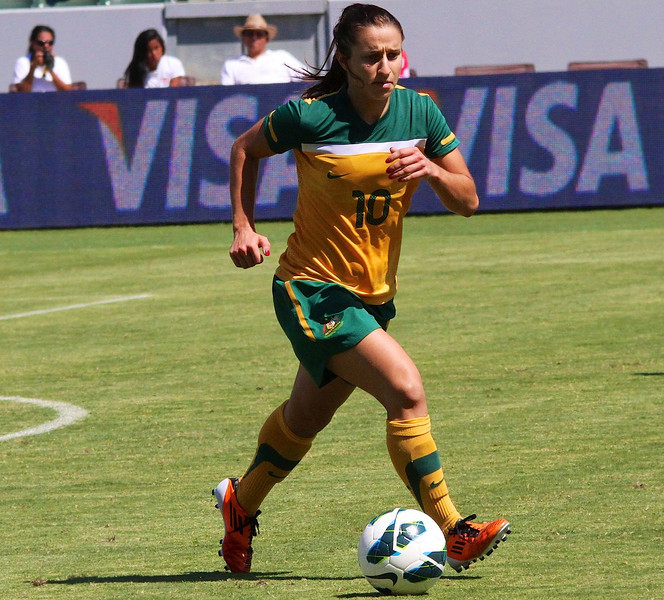
Uzunlar playing for Australia

=== Club ===
Sydney FC

- W-League Premiership: 2009, 2010–11
- W-League Championship: 2009

=== Country ===
Australia

- AFC Women's Asian Cup: 2010
- AFF Women's Championship: 2008

=== Individual ===
- Sydney FC W-League Player of the Year: 2009
- Western Sydney Wanderers FC W-League Player of the Year: 2012–13
