= Linda O'Neill =

Australian soccer player

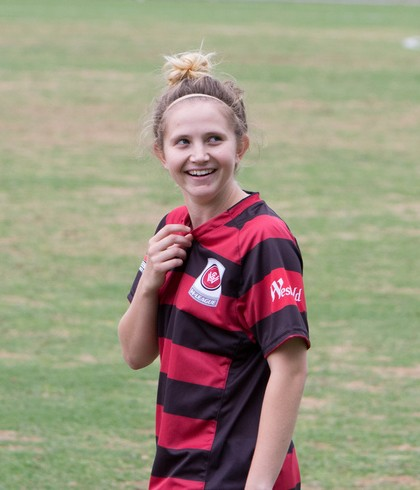
- O'Neill playing for Western Sydney Wanderers in 2012

Personal information
- Full name: Linda Jane O'Neill
- Date of birth: 25 May 1992 (age 34)
- Place of birth: Katoomba, Australia
- Height: 1.59 m (5 ft 3 in)
- Position: Midfielder

Youth career
- Nepean
- Marconi

Senior career*
Years	Team	Apps	(Gls)
2008–2011	Sydney FC	24	(2)
2011–2012	Newcastle Jets	10	(2)
2012–2016	Western Sydney Wanderers	40	(2)

International career
2008	Australia U17	3	(0)
2008–2011	Australia U20		
- * Club domestic league appearances and goals

Linda Jane O'Neill (born 25 May 1992) is a retired Australian association football player, who last played for Western Sydney Wanderers in the Australian W-League.

== Personal life ==
Her profession outside of football is a registered nurse, a role that she has been training for alongside her football career since the age of 16. Since retiring from football at the age of 24, she has been a frontline nurse at Milton Ulladulla Hospital.

== Honours ==
=== Club ===
Sydney FC:

- W-League Premiership: 2009
- W-League Championship: 2009
