= Kate Jacewicz =

Australian soccer referee (born 1985)

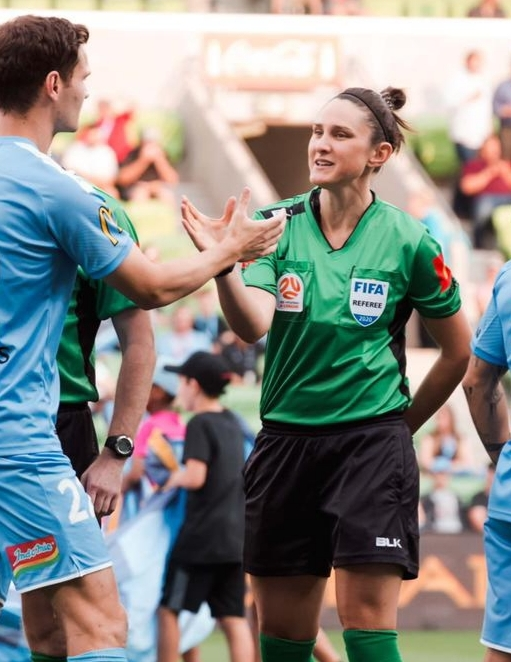
- Full name: Katherine Margaret Jacewicz
- Born: 6 April 1985 (age 41); Manly, New South Wales, Australia
- Other occupation: PRO Referee Coach

Domestic
Years	League	Role
2008–2023	W-League/A-League Women	Referee
2020–2023	A-League	Referee

International
Years	League	Role
2011–2023	FIFA listed	Referee
2023-	FIFA listed	VAR

Katherine Margaret Jacewicz (born 6 April 1985) is an Australian soccer referee. She was first FIFA listed in 2011.

== Refereeing career ==
Jacewicz began refereeing at the age of 13 when her brother's team needed a referee.

After being appointed to referee the 2019 W-League Grand Final, this was her ninth final out of the first eleven seasons of the W-League, which was rebranded in 2021 as A-League Women.

She became a FIFA referee in 2011, and was in charge of the Final of the 2016 FIFA U-17 Women's World Cup in Jordan.

Jacewicz was selected as one of the 27 referees for the 2019 FIFA Women's World Cup. She refereed two matches, including the round of 16 clash between Sweden and Canada.

In the 2019–20 A-League season, Jacewicz became the first woman to referee a match in the A-League when she took charge of the Melbourne City match against Newcastle Jets.

On 9 January 2023, FIFA appointed her to the officiating pool for the 2023 FIFA Women's World Cup in Australia. She refereed two matches, including the round of 16 clash between Colombia and Jamaica.

Jacewicz retired from the field in 2023, but remained a video match official. She became a referee coach for the Professional Referee Organization in 2026.
