= Nicola Bolger =

Australian football player

Personal information
- Full name: Nicola Marie Bolger
- Date of birth: 3 March 1993 (age 33)
- Place of birth: Westmead, Australia
- Height: 1.60 m (5 ft 3 in)
- Position: Midfielder

Senior career*
Years	Team	Apps	(Gls)
2008–2011	Sydney FC	16	(2)
2011–2012	Newcastle Jets	10	(3)
2012–2017	Sydney FC	64	(12)
2017–2018	Perth Glory	10	(1)

International career^{‡}
2014–2017	Australia	6	(0)
- * Club domestic league appearances and goals as of 21 February 2018 ‡ National team caps and goals as of 18 June 2015

Nicola Marie Bolger (born 3 March 1993) is an Australian football player who plays as a midfielder. She previously played for Newcastle Jets from 2011 to 2012.

== Club career ==
=== Perth Glory ===
In August 2017, Bolger joined Perth Glory.

== Honours ==
Sydney FC

- W-League Premiership: 2009
- W-League Championship: 2009
