= FIFA Fan Festival =

Fan conventions

Logo of FIFA Fan Festival

The FIFA Fan Festivals are public viewing events organized by FIFA and the host cities during the FIFA World Cup. FIFA Fan Festivals (initially named FIFA Fan Fests) followed the success of public viewing at the 2002 FIFA World Cup in South Korea and became an essential part of the tournament since the 2006 FIFA World Cup in Germany. Fan Festivals take place in iconic locations of the host cities and feature broadcasts of football matches on giant screens, live concerts, parties, food, beverages, and other activities and entertainment. In 2022, FIFA reintroduced Fan Festivals under the new name for the 2022 FIFA World Cup held in Qatar.

== History ==
=== Background ===
Public screenings of sports and particularly football tournaments were already common by the beginning of the 21st century. The first 1930 FIFA World Cup in Uruguay was broadcast on radio and fans gathered around receiving stations. FIFA pioneered TV broadcasts of football tournaments during the 1954 World Cup in Switzerland, and people in many countries carried TVs on the streets and watched them collectively with their neighbors. The 1998 FIFA World Cup in France was the first one to be broadcast on giant screens in city centers, but at that time the invention of massive public viewing was an anticipated effect of ticket shortage caused by a variety of factors.

=== 2002, South Korea/Japan ===
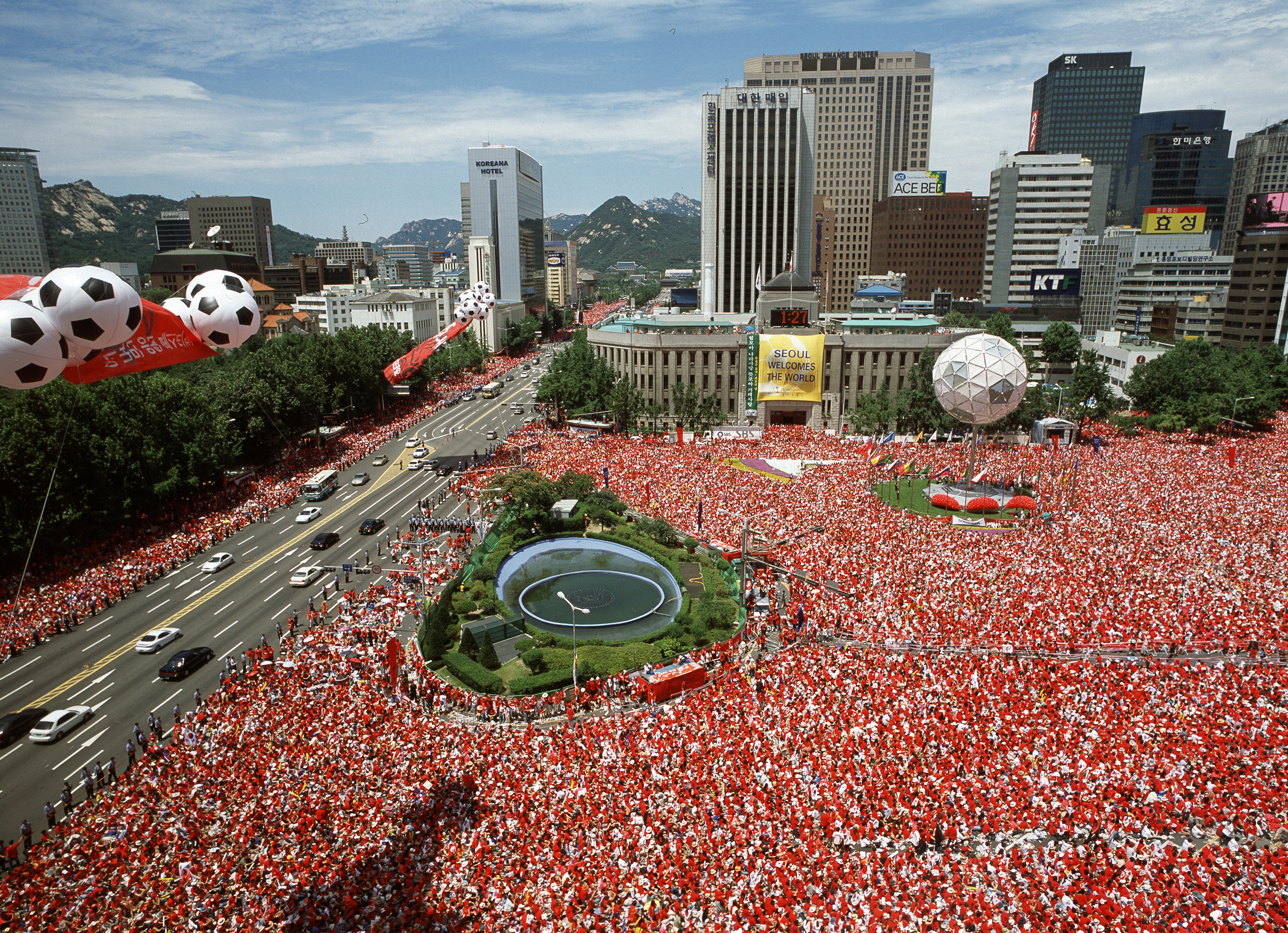
Seoul Plaza during the 2002 World Cup

The 2002 FIFA World Cup co-hosted by South Korea and Japan, the first World Cup to be held in Asia, surprised the world with Korea's unique culture of public viewing and street cheering. Japanese authorities considered enthusiastic fan behavior deviant, acted restrictive on the matter of public viewing and limited it to specific sites, i.e. the National Stadium in Tokyo where nearly 45 thousand people gathered to watch broadcasts of games taking place at Osaka and Sendai. Korean public administration, on the contrary, tolerated public demonstration of fan excitement and supported the creation of public viewing areas (PVAs) in an urban environment where people could watch the games on so-called "big screens". In addition to PVAs set up by local authorities and electric bulletin boards on the buildings many local companies arranged mobile screens on trucks.

The South Korea national football team showed remarkable performance throughout the tournament, and its supporters swarmed the streets and squares to watch broadcasts on the screens and celebrate collectively. The police tolerated extreme demonstrations of fan excitement, and Korean media portrayed street supporters in a positive light. Korean-style street cheering organized by the national team's supporting group Red Devils became a worldwide impression as nearly 7 million Koreans (1 in 7 of the population) gathered at PVAs during the semi-final game between South Korea and Germany. Public broadcasts and street cheering provided World Cup with a different "culture of viewing" that combined experience of high-quality TV broadcast and out-of-home reception at the stadium where companionship intensified the entertainment and enhanced the feelings.

=== 2006, Germany ===
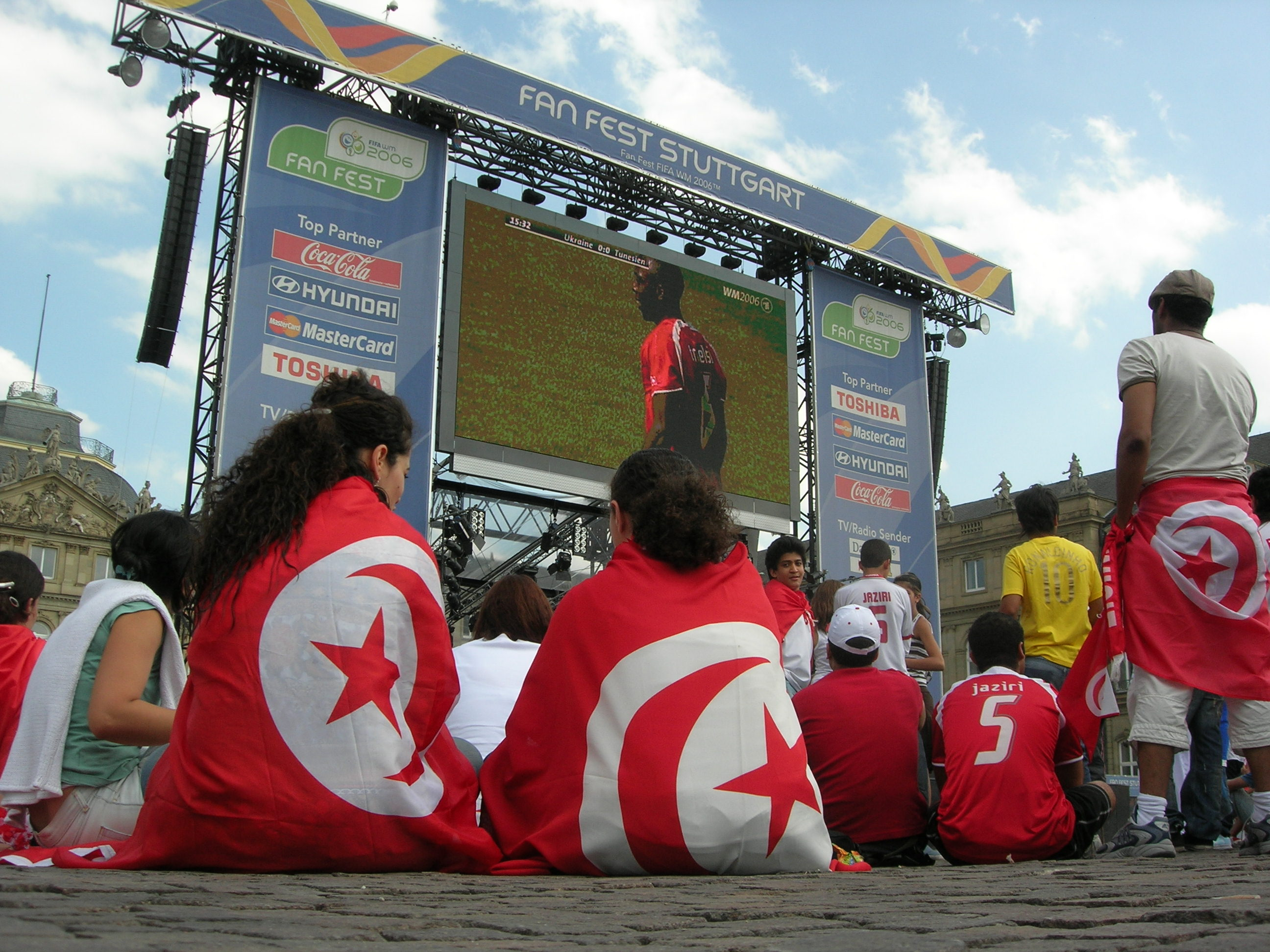
Tunisian supporters watching their match against Ukraine at the Fan Fest in Stuttgart, Germany

In preparation for the 2006 FIFA World Cup, FIFA and the Organizing Committee sought a way to accommodate people planning to visit the World Cup. The experience of past World Cups and public viewing was conceptualized in 4-weeks long events for football supporters to meet, board, interact, partake in cultural activities, and watch all 64 games on giant video walls. Since 2004 the details on costs, logistics, safety issues, marketing, and broadcast rights were jointly hammered out by FIFA and the Host Cities Those public viewing events that became known under the name of Fan Fests served as an idea to provide football supporters without tickets a legitimate opportunity to partake in the World Cup. Unlike the past tournaments where ticketless fans were treated as security risks, the World Cup in Germany welcomed all football supporters thus generating a positive atmosphere even before the tournament began. Even though security planners and media were skeptical and cautious on the matter of public viewing, the skepticism was cast aside with the beginning of the World Cup.

Fan Fests for the 2006 FIFA World Cup were set up in 12 Host Cities and attracted 21 million visitors throughout the tournament according to German National Tourist Board (FIFA claimed there were over 18 million visitors). Berlin "Fanmeile" located at pedestrianized Straße des 17. Juni between Brandenburg Gate and Victory Column with 14 consecutive video walls attracted 9 million fans over the duration of the World Cup with nearly 1 million supporters for each German football team game. For the first time in German history, an event scored more visitors than Oktoberfest. Cologne Fan Fest scored 3 million visitors followed by 1.9 million in Frankfurt, 1.5 million in Stuttgart, 1.46 million in Hamburg, 1 million per Dortmund and Munich, 500 thousand per Nuremberg and Hannover, 471 thousand in Leipzig, 350 thousand in Gelsenkirchen and 205 thousand in Kaiserslautern. Those numbers exceeded all expectations, and some of the Host Cities had to expand the Fan Fest areas in the middle of the World Cup. The most popular Fan Fests were located in the inner city areas, and the approach to keep the city center generally "fan-free" applied by the authorities of Nuremberg proved ineffective as many football supporters preferred to stay in the picturesque city center. According to surveys conducted during the 2006 FIFA World Cup at the Fan Fests in Berlin, Frankfurt, and Munich 28% of visitors traveled over 100 kilometers to attend the event, and up to 84% came there together with friends. Around 21% of foreigners interviewed at Fan Fests visited Germany to see the World Cup without tickets to any game. Media coverage of events had an additional positive effect as pictures of fans celebrating in front of giant screens attracted even more visitors from neighboring European countries that spontaneously decided to take part in celebrations at Fan Fests.

Despite minor inconsistencies in planning and execution, the Fan Fest concept was so successful, that numerous people later claimed personal responsibility for the invention. The visitors' expectations regarding Fan Fests were fulfilled. Throughout the World Cup Fan Fests served as modern market squares where communication and interaction strengthen the feeling of community. Out-of-home media reception made the emotional aspect of escape from everyday life more intense for participants. Pictures of football supporters celebrating in front of video walls became a typical illustration of the atmosphere in the country, while "Fanmeile" was later picked up as German Word of the Year. In 2007 FIFA and 12 Host Cities received the German Marketing Prize for Sports for the innovative nature and marketing concept of Fan Fests during the 2006 World Cup Finals. FIFA and the Host Cities succeeded in creating and comfortable environment for foreign fans as 95% of them surveyed at Fan Fests agreed that it was an unequivocal declaration of the international nature of the World Cup, and was not a mere event for Germans. A thought-out implementation of public viewing at such a large-scale football event as the 2006 World Cup set a precedent. Immediately after the 2006 World Cup, FIFA announced that it registered the trademark for Fan Fests, took over the organization and marketing, and will make Fan Fests an integral part of future FIFA World Cups.

==== Locations ====
Germany

- Berlin — Straße des 17. Juni (between Brandenburg Gate and Victory Column)
- Cologne — Heumarkt, Roncalliplatz, Rheinauhafen and Deutzer shipyard
- Frankfurt — MainArena (at banks of Main river)
- Stuttgart — Schlossplatz
- Hamburg — Heiligengeistfeld
- Dortmund — Friedensplatz
- Munich — Olympiapark
- Nuremberg — Volksfestplatz
- Hannover — Waterlooplatz
- Leipzig — Augustusplatz
- Gelsenkirchen — Glückauf-Kampfbahn
- Kaiserslautern — Stiftsplatz, Barbarossastrasse

=== 2010, South Africa ===
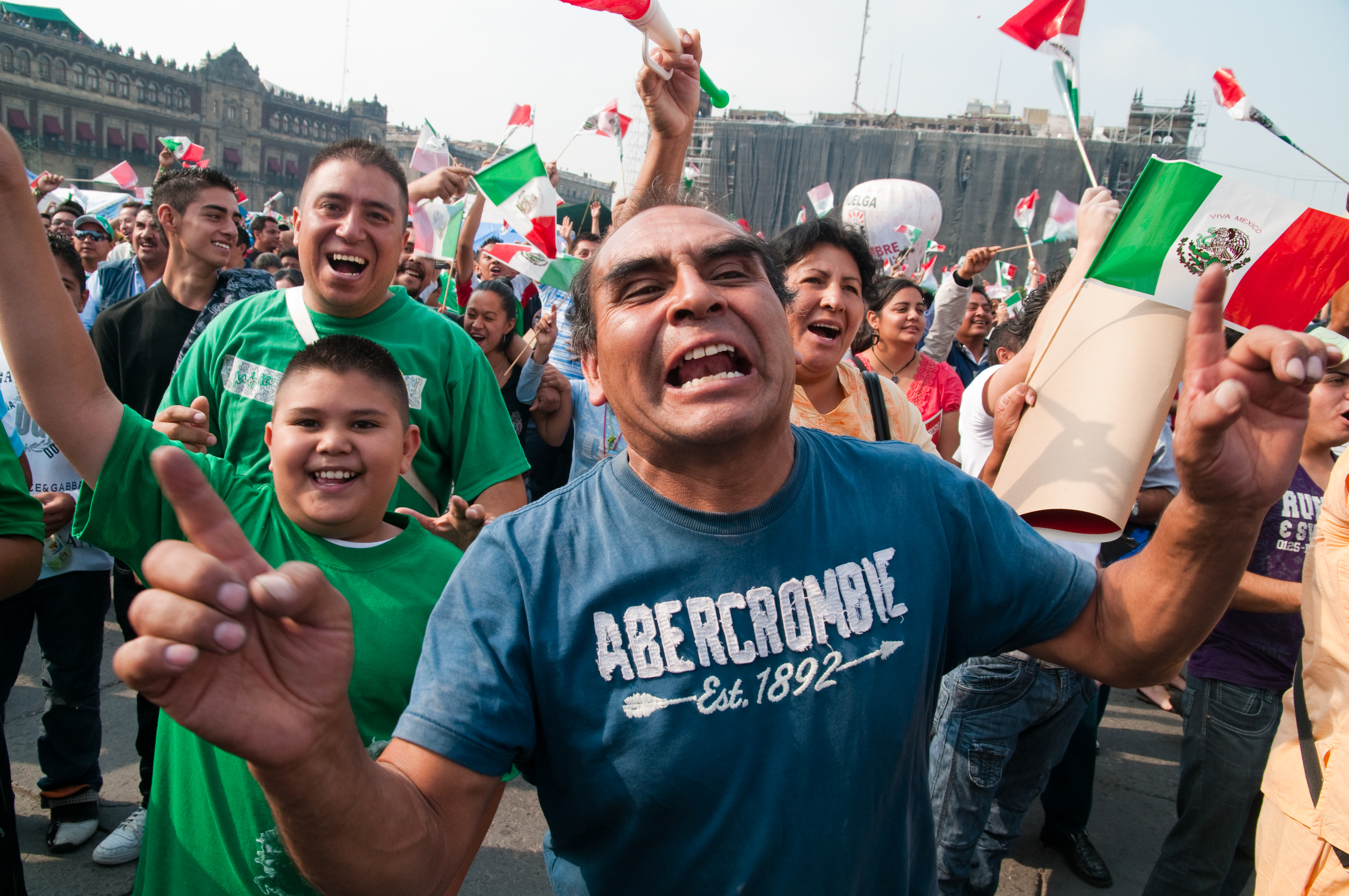
A Mexico national football team supporter reacts emotionally to a disallowed goal in a Mexico v. South Africa game, 2010

FIFA had further developed the Fan Fest concept for 2010 FIFA World Cup in South Africa. That time FIFA went global with 6 international Fan Fests in Berlin, Mexico City, Paris, Rio de Janeiro, Rome, and Sydney in addition to 10 national Fan Fests in Cape Town, Durban, Sandton, Soweto, Port Elizabeth, Bloemfontein, Nelspruit, Polokwane, Rustenburg, and Pretoria. According to FIFA, the Fan Fests in Host Cities attracted over 2.6 million fans with Durban, Cape Town, and Port Elizabeth being the most popular location with 741 thousand, 557 thousand, and 276 thousand visitors respectively. International Fan Fest totaled 3.5 million fans with 350 thousand fans in Berlin at Germany v. Spain semi-final followed by 93.5 thousand spectators in Mexico City for the Argentina v. Mexico match and 83.7 thousand people in Rio de Janeiro for the Brazil v. Côte d'Ivoire game. Australian fans ignored the time zone difference to attend the Fan Fest to watch Australia v. Germany game in the middle of the night.

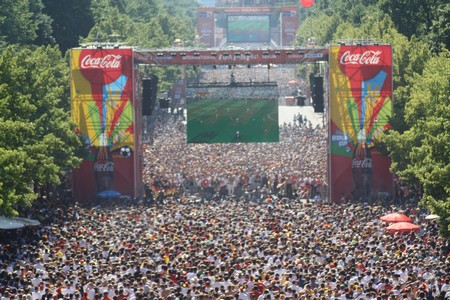
The Berlin Fan Mile (Fanmeile) on the 17th June Street, View from the Press Tower, 2010

South African government considered the 2010 World Cup a huge success for the national economy. Hosting an international tournament helped the Host Cities to attract investments in sports venues, telecommunications, and transport infrastructure, boosted tourism, and promoted national identity (that was especially important for the country that was under apartheid for 46 years). 2010 World Cup's legacy included development projects that benefited local communities and were directly related to FIFA Fan Fests. Mangaung Outdoor Sports Centre in Bloemfontein meant to become a Fan Fest location underwent repairs and upgrades that remained after the tournament was over. Cape Town authorities provided NGOs working on environment protection and sustainability initiatives a notable presence at World Cup's main Fan Fest at Grand Parade. Development projects in the City of Tshwane ranged from the extension of CCTV to providing additional security for fans to support informal traders, vendors, and artists. Local catering vendors were certified and allowed to operate at Fan Fests and other venues; traders were provided an opportunity to sell local goods to visitors and artists participated in Fan Fest activities. All of them were added to the government database to be considered for future cooperation with the City of Tshwane authorities. In 2012 FIFA launched the 2010 FIFA World Cup Legacy Trust to support a wide range of development projects in sports, education, health, and humanitarian activities in South Africa.

==== Locations ====
South Africa

- Cape Town — Grand Parade
- Durban — New Beach
- Johannesburg / Sandton — Innesfree Park
- Johannesburg / Soweto — Elkah Stadium
- Bloemfontein — Mangaung Outdoor Sports Centre,
- Port Elizabeth — St George's Park
- Nelspruit — Bergvlam High School
- Polokwane — Polokwane Cricket Club
- Rustenburg — Fields College School
- Pretoria — Centurion Cricket Ground

International

- (Germany) Berlin — Olympischer Platz (in front of Olympiastadion) and Strasse des 17. Juni (Victory Column)
- Mexico City — Zócalo (Plaza de la Constitución)
- (France) Paris — Jardins du Trocadéro
- (Brazil) Rio de Janeiro — Copacabana
- (Italy) Rome — Piazza di Siena (Villa Borghese gardens)
- (Australia) Sydney — Darling Harbour

=== 2014, Brazil ===
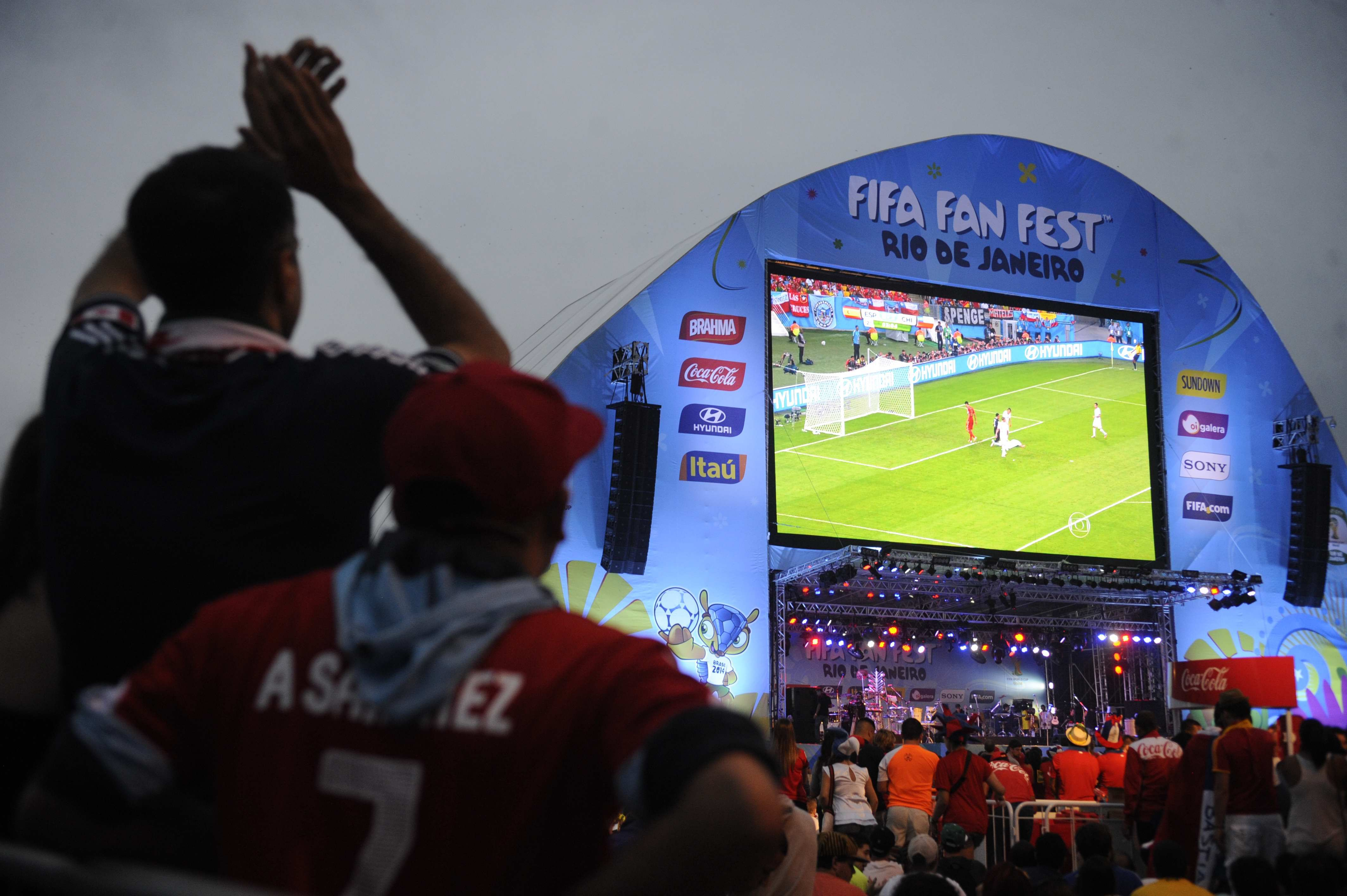
Broadcast on the big screen at Rio de Janeiro Fan Fest, 2014

2014 FIFA World Cup Fan Fests took place in 12 Host Cities: Rio de Janeiro, São Paulo, Brasília, Belo Horizonte, Cuiabá, Curitiba, Fortaleza, Manaus, Natal, Porto Alegre, Salvador, and Recife. Fan Fest was set up in iconic locations, common places for public celebrations. Brazilian football star Ronaldo became the Fan Fest ambassador for the 2014 World Cup in addition to his role as a member of the Organizing Committee. Due to the high cost of the World Cup infrastructure, the Host Cities wanted to attract private investors to co-finance Fan Fests for football supporters. I. e., the Municipality of Recife squandered public funds on the construction of Itaipava Arena Pernambuco (14th most expensive stadium in the world by that time with a total cost of 274 million) and claimed itself unable to fund the original Fan Fest project. In March 2014, Recife authorities declared they would wait for external financing for Fan Fest. The deadlock was resolved one month before the World Cup in May when FIFA and its Brazilian partner stepped in to organize Fan Fest in Recife on their own.

2014 World Cup Fan Fests attracted over 5.1 million fans, including nearly 1 million tourists from 202 countries. The Fan Fest at Copacabana Beach in Rio de Janeiro was the most popular, with 937 thousand attendees throughout the World Cup, followed by São Paulo with 806 thousand visitors, Fortaleza with 781 thousand, and Manaus with 504 thousand guests. The Argentina v. Germany game was the most popular, with 265 thousand fans on Fan Fests in all 12 Host Cities.

==== Locations ====
Brazil
- Rio de Janeiro – Praia de Copacabana (Copacabana Beach)
- São Paulo – Vale do Anhangabaú (Anhangabaú Valley)
- Brasília – Taguaparque (Taguatinga)
- Belo Horizonte – Expominas (Expominas Expositions Centre)
- Cuiabá – Parque de Exposições (Expositions Park)
- Curitiba – Pedreira Paulo Leminski (Paulo Leminski Quarry)
- Fortaleza – Praia de Iracema (Iracema Beach)
- Manaus – Praia Ponta Negra (Black Beach)
- Natal – Praia do Forte (Fort Beach)
- Porto Alegre – Anfiteatro Pôr do Sol (Sunset Amphitheatre)
- Recife – Cais da Alfândega (Customhouse Wharf).
- Salvador – Farol da Barra (Barra Lighthouse)

=== 2018, Russia ===
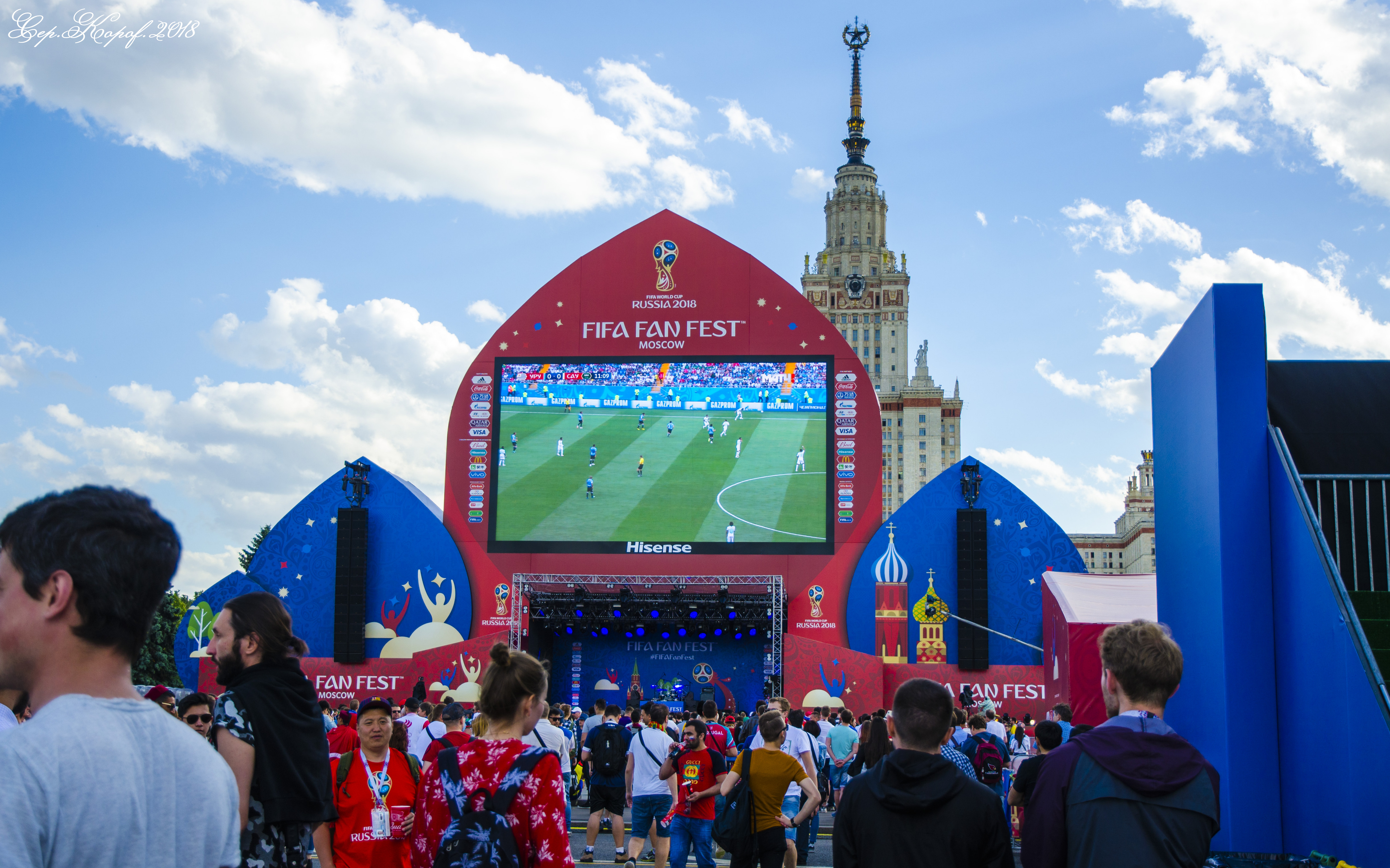
Moscow Fan Fest, Sparrow Hills. 20 June 2018

For the 2018 FIFA World Cup in Russia, Fan Fests took place in Moscow, Saint Petersburg, Kazan, Sochi, Volgograd, Nizhny Novgorod, Rostov-on-Don, Kaliningrad, Yekaterinburg, Samara, and Saransk. In November 2017, FIFA unveiled Russia national football team's record goalscorer Aleksandr Kerzhakov and French 1998 World Cup and Euro 2000 winner Marcel Desailly as ambassadors for Fan Fests of the 2018 Cup.

According to FIFA, the Fan Fests attracted 7.7 million people, exceeding the numbers of the 2014 World Cup in Brazil by a quarter. The festivals at Sparrow Hills in Moscow and Konyushennaya Square in Saint Petersburg exceeded 1 million participants each with 1.87 and 1.303 million fans, respectively. 738 thousand people participated in Fan Fest in Kazan. Nizhny Novgorod, Samara, and Volgograd totaled 600 thousand each; followed by 500 thousand per Sochi and Rostov-on-Don, 400 thousand in Saransk, 385 thousand in Kaliningrad, and 310 thousand in Ekaterinburg. The Russia — Uruguay match alone attracted nearly half a million fans to Fan Festivals all over the country. The broadcast time for all the games totaled 917 hours and the event schedule for Fan Fests reached 323 hours.

==== Locations ====
Russia
- Moscow — Sparrow Hills (in front of Moscow State University)
- Saint Petersburg — Konyushennaya Square
- Kazan — Kazan Family Center (on the bank of Kazanka River)
- Sochi — Sochi Seaport Area (square of South Mall of the Seaport)
- Volgograd — 62 Armii Embankment
- Nizhny Novgorod — Minina i Pozharskogo Square
- Rostov-on-Don — Teatralnaya Square
- Kaliningrad — Central Square (near the House of Soviets)
- Yekaterinburg — Mayakovsky Central Park of Entertainment and Culture
- Samara — Kuybyshev Square
- Saransk — Sovetskaya Square

=== 2022, Qatar ===
For the 2022 World Cup in Qatar, which became the first sports mega-event to be hosted in the Middle East, FIFA reimagined and reintroduced Fan Fest as a more diverse and inclusive Fan Festival. The new vision combined public viewing on a giant screen with a wider variety of cultural activities, art, music, and gastronomy. Fan Festivals introduced numerous digital and physical football-related activities, such as exclusive football games with the participation of FIFA Legends. FIFA+ digital platform became an essential part of the Fan Festivals to provide fans access to every important moment of the World Cup.

The main Fan Festival took place at Al Bidda Park along the scenic Doha Corniche (bayside promenade) on 20 November — 18 December 2022. The 146,000 m^{2} site accommodated up to 40,000 guests at a time. In 2022, FIFA also introduced a new licensing model, which allowed its partners to launch local Fan Festivals in major cities outside the host countries to make the tournament experience more accessible to the global fan community. This approach was meant to answer the challenges of running FIFA mega-events in smaller countries like Qatar. In partnership with Coca-Cola, FIFA launched Fan Festival in Riyadh. It also partnered with AB InBev brands to run BudX Fan Festivals in London, Seoul, and Dubai, Corona Fan Festival in Mexico, and Brahma Fan Festivals in São Paulo and Rio de Janeiro. These international events welcomed a combined total of 460,000 visitors.

To respect the Muslim traditions that prohibit alcohol consumption, which is considered an essential dionysian festive social ritual of the fan culture, FIFA decided to place some restrictions. Alcohol beverages were only served at the Fan Festival site between 6:30 PM and 1 AM, Within the context of the 2022 World Cup, this approach seamlessly complemented the new vision of Fan Festivals as it provided families with kids an alcohol-free zone for most of the day.

FIFA Fan Festival at Al Bidda Park attracted around 70,000 daily visitors, and a total of 1.8 fans attended the festival site over during the World Cup. For the first time in Fan Festivals history, the 2022 edition got its official anthem by Myriam Fares, Nicki Minaj, and Maluma. 146 music artists performed at the main Fan Festival venue, including Nora Fatehi, Gims, Calvin Harris, Patoranking, Kizz Daniel, Diplo, Trinidad Cardona, Stonebwoy, Sean Paul, and Michael Jackson impersonator Rodrigo Teaser.

==== Locations ====
Qatar

- Doha — Al Bidda Park

International

- (United Arab Emirates) Dubai — Dubai Harbour
- (England) London — Outernet
- Mexico City — Plaza de la República
- (Brazil) Rio de Janeiro — Copacabana
- (Brazil) São Paulo — Vale do Anhangabaú
- (South Korea) Seoul — S Factory

=== 2023, Australia/New Zealand ===
From 20 July to 20 August 2023, Fan Festivals were rolled out for the first time for the Women's World Cup in Australia and New Zealand—the biggest women's sporting event worldwide. Nine venues were launched in the host cities of Adelaide, Brisbane, Melbourne, Perth, Sydney, Auckland, Dunedin, Hamilton, and Wellington. The Fan Festival in Auckland was closed for the first day on 20 July to pay respect to shooting victims in downtown Auckland that day.

Following the Fan Festival concept introduced at the 2022 FIFA World Cup in Qatar, the venues in Australia and New Zealand provided public viewing of games, various sports and cultural activities, street entertainers, gastronomy by award-winning chefs, and local street food, lectures, discussions, and art performances.

The music line-ups presented performers working in different genres, from pop to folk, including Kimbra, San Cisco, Montaigne (in Adelaide), Running Touch, Kita Alexander, FELIVAND, Sahara Beck, Eliza & The Delusionals (in Brisbane), Sycco, Samantha Jade (in Melbourne), Katy Steele, Crucial Rockers, Joan & The Giants, Abbe May (in Perth), Jessica Mauboy, Steph Strings, Jacoténe, Jack River, Mia Wray, Tia Gostelow, Mikayla Pasterfield, Little Green (in Sydney), JessB, Ladi6, Troy Kingi, Tuawahine, Hollie Smith, Kaylee Bell (in Auckland), Bic Runga, Topp Twins, Ladyhawke (in Dunedin), AACACIA, Robinson, Ella Monnery, Lou'ana (in Hamilton), Rubi Du, Maisey Rika, Che Fu (in Wellington).

The Fan Festivals in the playground area featured a variety of interactive football skill games, including hungerball, bubble football, football golf, football snooker, football darts, reaction station, penalty practice shoot-out, and shooting speedometer. Attendees also could have participated in VR experiences, silent disco, glitter make-up sessions hosted by local drag queens, and cultural activities such as Poi workshops and tā moko lessons in New Zealand.

Fan Festivals introduced an intense program of lectures and panel discussions on the history and future of women in sports, culture, business, and society; on inclusion, sustainability, and gender equality in sports; and on empowering LGBTQ+ community through football. The guests included renowned members of the Australia women's national soccer team (the Matildas): Jill Latimer, Emma Wirkus, Tracey Jenkins, Sharon Black, Victoria Balomenos, Kristyn Swaffer, and FIFA Legends.

The first cultural events within the Fan Festival sites started in March 2023 with the outdoor exhibitions of the 2023 Women's World Cup official poster and host cities posters in Adelaide and Wellington. In all host cities, FIFA opened FIFA Museums with exhibitions dedicated to the history of the World Cup and past world champions. Additionally, the FIFA Museum in Sydney also presented a "Calling the Shots: Faces of Women's Football" exhibition, which attracted over 50 thousand visitors, and the FIFA Museum in Auckland launched its own pop-up exhibition space, "The Rainbow of Shirts."

A total of 777 thousand people attended Fan Festivals in 9 host cities at the 2023 FIFA Women's World Cup. The venue in Tumbalong Park, Darling Harbour, Sydney, was the largest, with 250 thousand visitors over 31 days of the tournament. The attendance peaked on 12 August 2023, for Australia's quarter-final win over France, with 68 thousand people across all venues.

==== Locations ====
Australia

- Adelaide — Festival Plaza
- Brisbane — South Bank Parklands
- Melbourne — Federation Square
- Perth — Forrest Place
- Sydney — Tumbalong Park

New Zealand

- Auckland — The Cloud
- Dunedin — Dunedin Town Hall
- Hamilton — Globox Arena
- Wellington — Shed 6

=== 2026, United States/Canada/Mexico ===
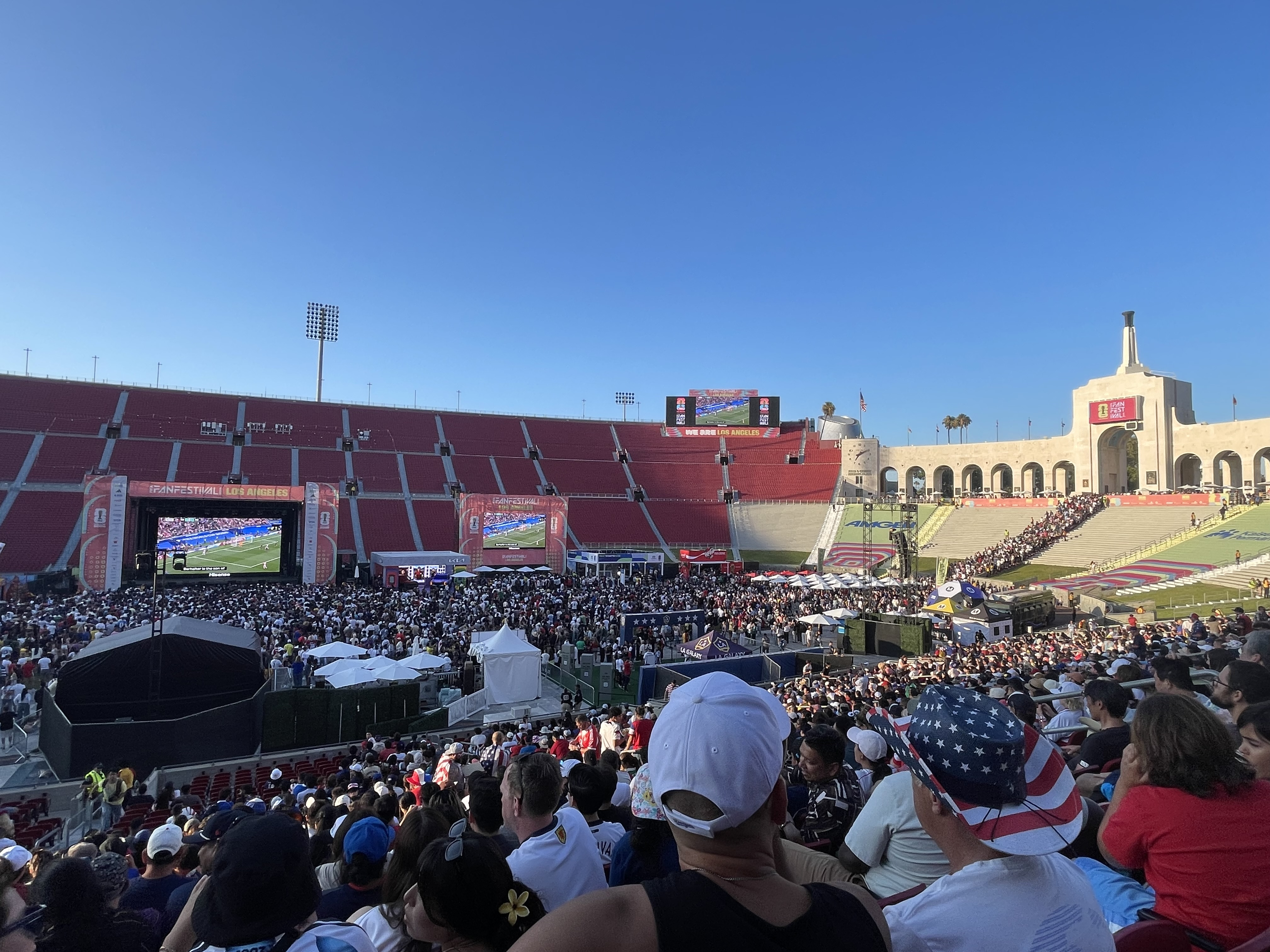
A FIFA Fan Festival being held at the Los Angeles Memorial Coliseum in Los Angeles.

In June 2022, FIFA announced the list of host cities and stadiums for the 2026 FIFA World Cup, which was collectively hosted by the United States, Canada, and Mexico. The list included Toronto and Vancouver in Canada; Guadalajara, Mexico City, and Monterrey in Mexico; Atlanta, Boston, Dallas, Houston, Kansas City, Los Angeles, Miami, New York / New Jersey, Philadelphia, San Francisco, and Seattle in the United States. Proposed Fan Festival spaces included locations such as Liberty State Park (Jersey City, New Jersey), Central Park (New York), and the National Mall (Washington, D.C.).

==== Locations ====
Canada

- Toronto — Fort York and The Bentway
- Vancouver — Hastings Park

Mexico

- Guadalajara — Plaza de la Liberación
- Mexico City — Zócalo
- Monterrey — Fundidora Park

United States

- Atlanta — Centennial Olympic Park
- Boston — Boston City Hall
- Dallas — Fair Park
- Houston — East Downtown Houston
- Kansas City — National World War I Museum and Memorial
- Los Angeles — Los Angeles Memorial Coliseum
- Miami — Bayfront Park
- Philadelphia — Fairmount Park

Fan zones in New York/New Jersey included Sports Illustrated Stadium, USTA Billie Jean King National Tennis Center, Rockefeller Center, SIUH Community Park, Bronx Terminal Market, Brooklyn Bridge Park, and Central Park instead of the large fan festival planned for Liberty State Park.

The San Francisco Bay Area hosted fan zones in San Francisco, Oakland, Pleasanton, Walnut Creek, Richmond, San Jose, Milpitas, Sunnyvale, Morgan Hill, Sausalito, Napa, Redwood City, San Mateo, San Carlos, Half Moon Bay, Mountain View, and Santa Cruz instead of the planned central large fan festival.

In addition to the Seattle fan zone at Pacific Place, the state of Washington had additional fan zones in Bellingham, Bremerton, Everett, Olympia, Spokane, Tacoma, Tri-Cities, Vancouver, and Yakima instead of the planned fan festival at Seattle Center.

The Atlanta suburb of Decatur hosted a fan festival.

Fan zones in Los Angeles also included Original Farmers Market, Downey, Los Angeles Union Station, Hansen Dam, Magic Johnson Park, Whittier Narrows, Venice Beach, Fairplex, West Harbor, and Burbank.

The state of Pennsylvania also hosted fan festivals in Pittsburgh, Reading, and Scranton.

In January 2026, FIFA announced "Canada Celebrates", a series of events in over 40 communities throughout the tournament that featured live viewings of the matches.

== Organization ==
=== Sponsorship ===
FIFA offers its affiliates various sponsorship and partnership opportunities that provide recognition across FIFA Fan Fests in Host Cities. 2010 World Cup Fan Fests introduced The Coca-Cola Company as Presenting sponsor, MTN Group and Neo Africa as sponsors, and South African Broadcasting Corporation as the Official broadcaster. FIFA Fan Fests at the 2014 World Cup were sponsored by AmBev, The Coca-Cola Company, Hyundai Kia, Banco Itaú, Johnson & Johnson, Oi, and Sony. 2018 FIFA Fan Fest in Russia introduced Adidas, The Coca-Cola Company, Wanda, Gazprom, Hyundai Group, Qatar Airways, and Visa as FIFA Partners, and Budweiser, Hisense, McDonald's, Mengniu, and Vivo as World Cup sponsors. 2022 FIFA Fan Festivals in Qatar introduced Adidas, The Coca-Cola Company, Wanda, QatarEnergy, Hyundai Group, Qatar Airways, and Visa as FIFA Partners, and Budweiser, Hisense, McDonald's, Mengniu, and Vivo as World Cup sponsors.

=== Regulations ===
FIFA requires the host countries to apply specific by-laws and regulations for the duration of the World Cups. Those measures are meant to provide FIFA, its sponsors, and partners exclusive rights within and around sports venues and Fan Festivals. Such regulations are included in World Cup-specific laws such as Special Measures Act in South Africa, General World Cup Law in Brazil, and The Federal Law on Carrying out the FIFA World Cup in 2018 and FIFA Confederation Cup in 2017 in Russia. Regarding FIFA Fan Festivals those legislations regulate advertising, signage, street trading and vending, beautification, and decorum. According to those laws, FIFA, its sponsors, partners, and authorized third parties get exclusive rights to advertise and sell goods, food, and beverage within and around Fan Festivals. Nonetheless, softened those restrictions every World Cup. In 2006 it happened due to protests from Organising Committee pressured by German companies. In 2010, local informal business was integrated into World Cup events through development projects promoting local culture. In 2014, local businesses, NGOs, community organizations, and local authorities achieved that through negotiations.

=== Experience ===
The entrance-free FIFA Fan Festivals provide visitors with an inclusive, special, and highly emotional way to watch World Cup games. That way Fan Festivals attract people who would otherwise never go to a sports venue. I.e. according to monitoring and surveys during the 2006 FIFA World Cup in Germany, the share of female supporters at Fan Fests reached 44% thereby notably exceeding the share of women at stadiums. FIFA doesn't prohibit alcohol consumption at Fan Festivals as monitoring through the 2006 World Cup in Germany, 2010 World Cup in South Africa and 2014 World Cup in Brazil proved the sale of alcohol cause no public disturbance or violence while the absence of alcohol at Fan Festivals may discourage fans from visiting PVAs and guide them towards peripheral bars and areas where they may be targeted by hooligans. Due to FIFA's policy, Brazil even had to temporarily lift its ban on alcohol sales at football matches enforced in 2003 in a bid to curb fan violence.

In addition to live broadcasts, FIFA Fan Festivals offer food and beverages, merchandise, and various entertainment events by local and international artists. The start of the 2006 World Cup was celebrated by a concert at Fan Fest in Berlin, kicked off by Scottish rock band Simple Minds and followed by Canadian pop singer Nelly Furtado, English band Right Said Fred and Italian singers Gianna Nannini and Andrea Bocelli. Live concerts and shows followed on other World Cup days when there were no games scheduled. In South Africa, Ziggy Marley performed at Fan Fest in Johannesburg while Port Elizabeth Fan Fest presented a concert by Fatboy Slim, Locnville, and Just Jinjer. International Fan Fests' line-ups included Velile, K'naan, Uwu Lena, and Eisblume in Berlin, La Sonora Dinamita in Mexico, and Stan Walker and Cassie Davis in Sydney. In 2010 the event schedule for Fan Fests totaled 2600 hours in Host Cities and 1600 hours at International Fan Fests. In Brazil FIFA's broadcasting partner, TV Globo, organized 754 live music performances at Fan Fests in Host Cities through 25 days of the World Cup. Cristiano Araújo, Claudia Leitte, Jota Quest, Skank, Luan Santana, and Gusttavo Lima performed for Brazilian and foreign fans at 10 fan zones. Fan Fest organizers also aimed to promote local culture via various entertaining activities and provide a family-friendly environment where children could follow the parents or play in secured child-friendly areas. 2018 FIFA Fan Fests in Russia introduced Zemfira, Bravo, Kasta, Vadim Samoilov from Agatha Christie, Billy's Band, Chaif, Diskoteka Avariya IOWA, Benny Benassi, Paul Oakenfold, Pendulum, and Kadebostany.

=== FIFA-licensed festivals and public viewing ===
FIFA sets up official Fan Festivals and owns the trademark. It also licenses other formats of fan events and public viewing. Under the new International FIFA Fan Fest licensing model, introduced in 2022, FIFA partners can launch local Fan Festivals in strict accordance with FIFA guidelines. FIFA also allows organizing non-official commercial and non-commercial public viewing areas (PVAs). Those private public PVAs should not use any FIFA branding or suggest any official link with the FIFA World Cup trademark, though the World Cup theme is allowed.

The funds raised through licensing commercial public viewing areas are allocated to various social development programs via FIFA-affiliated bodies. In 2006, the funds were donated to SOS Children's Villages and the official 2006 World Cup charity campaign "Six villages for 2006", the profits of the 2010 World Cup were used to rebuild 20 football centers in South Africa as a part of FIFA's "20 Centres for 2010" campaign. In 2014, the licensing fees went to community organizations that use football as a catalyst for social development a part of FIFA Football for Hope social development program.

== Gallery ==
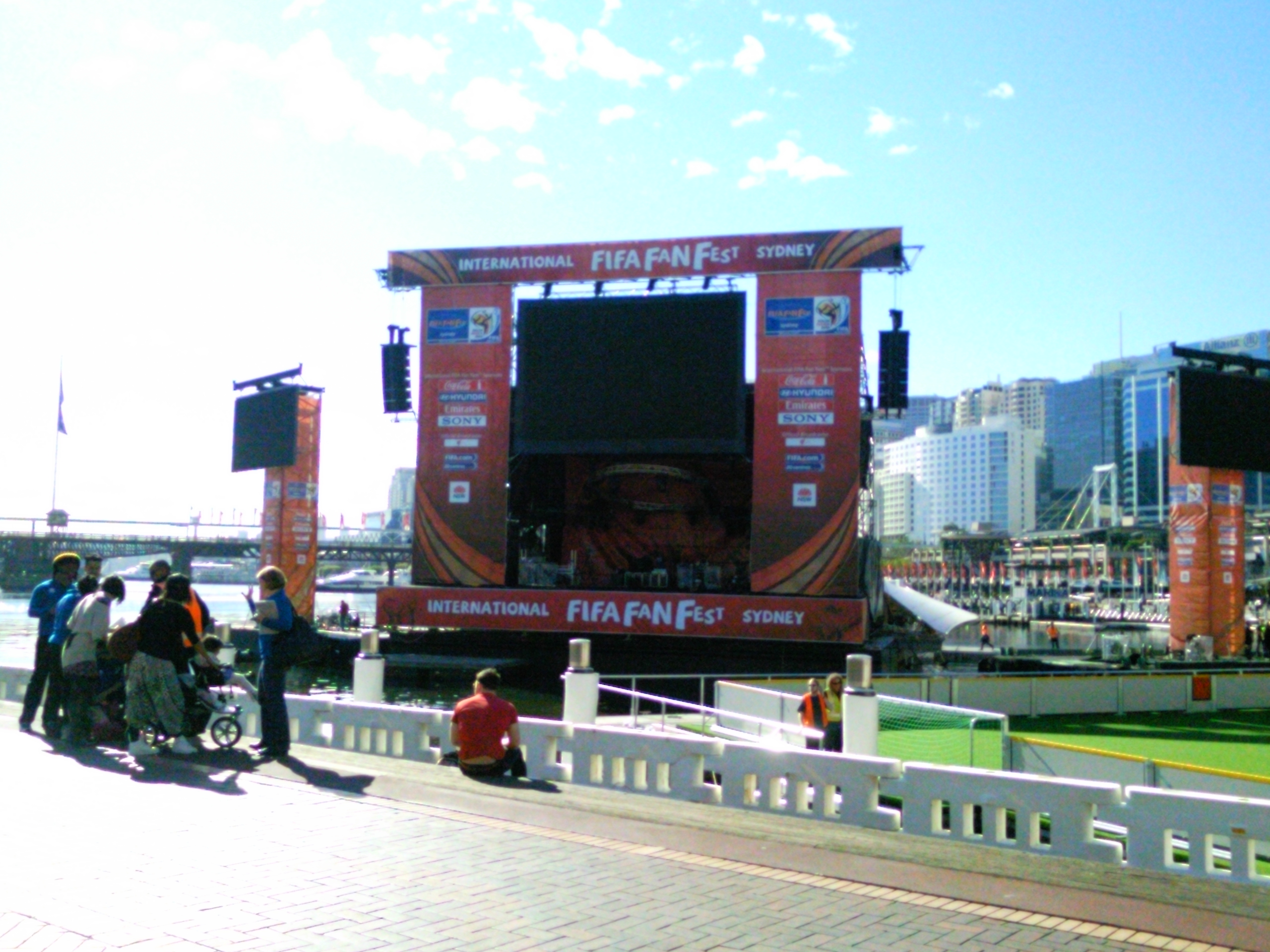
The giant screen being set up at Darling Harbour, 2010.

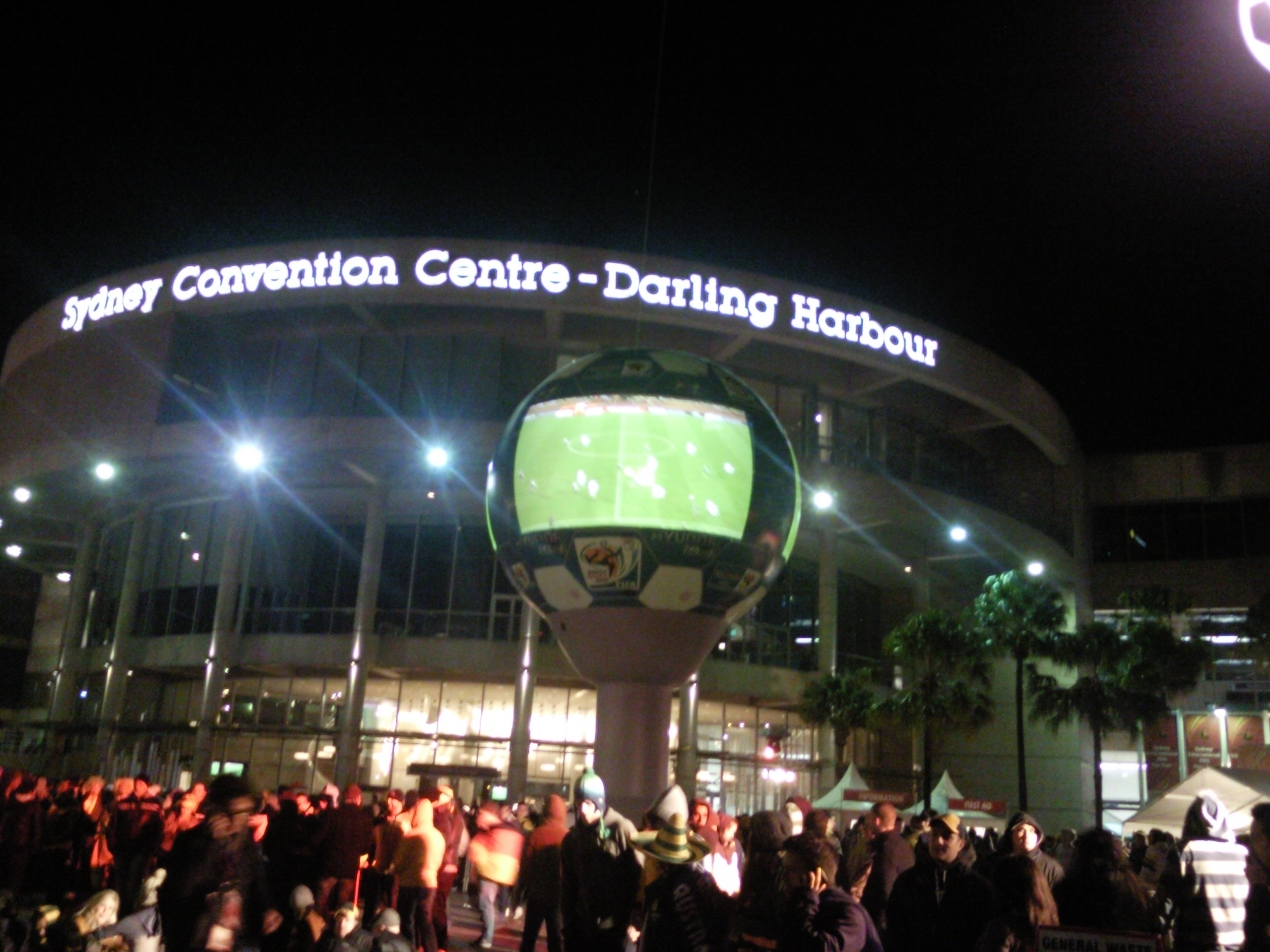
One of the screens set up at Darling Harbour during the Germany V Australia game, located in front of the Sydney Convention and Exhibition Centre, 2010.

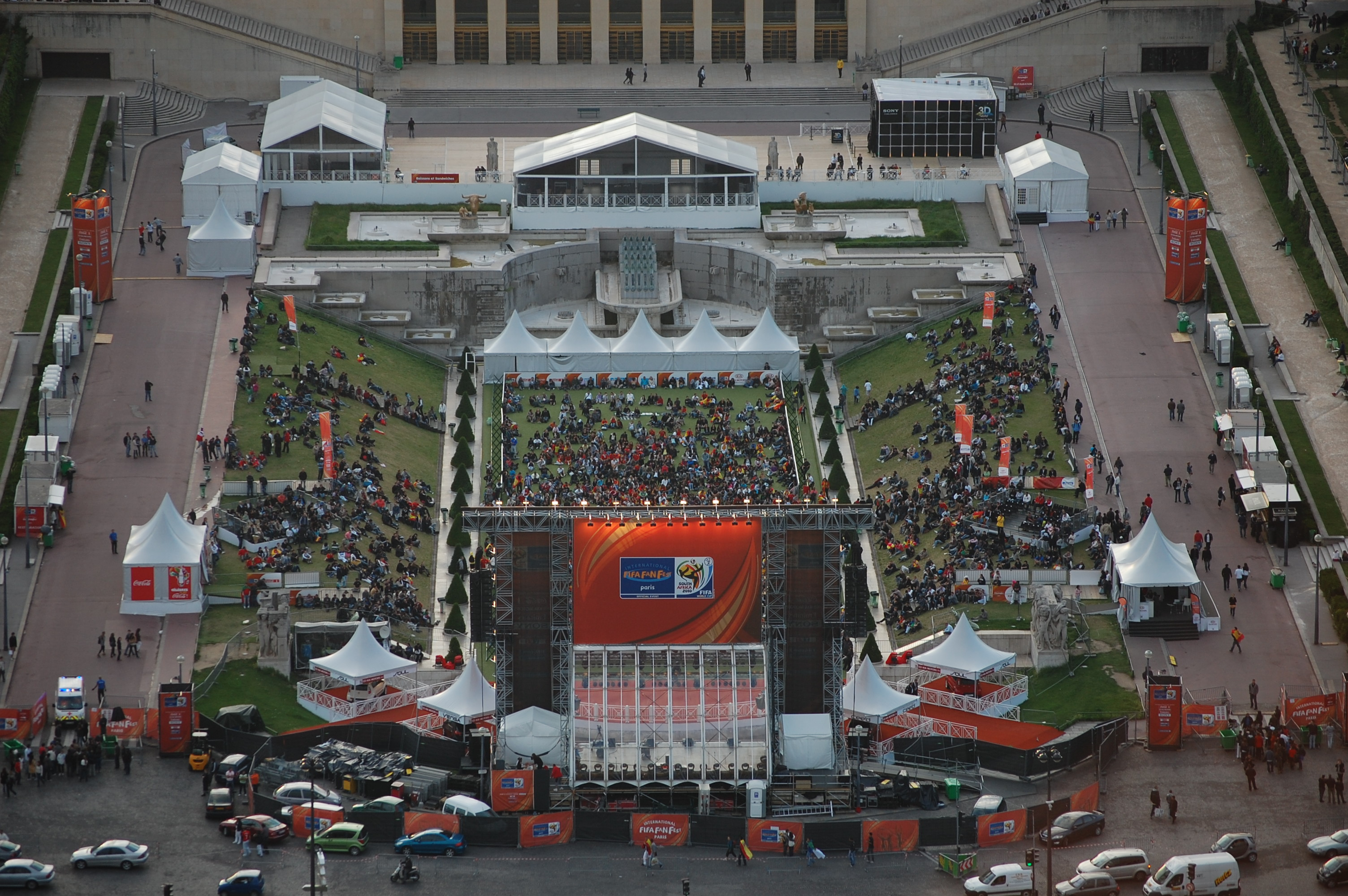
The Fan Fest in Trocadéro, Paris, 2010.

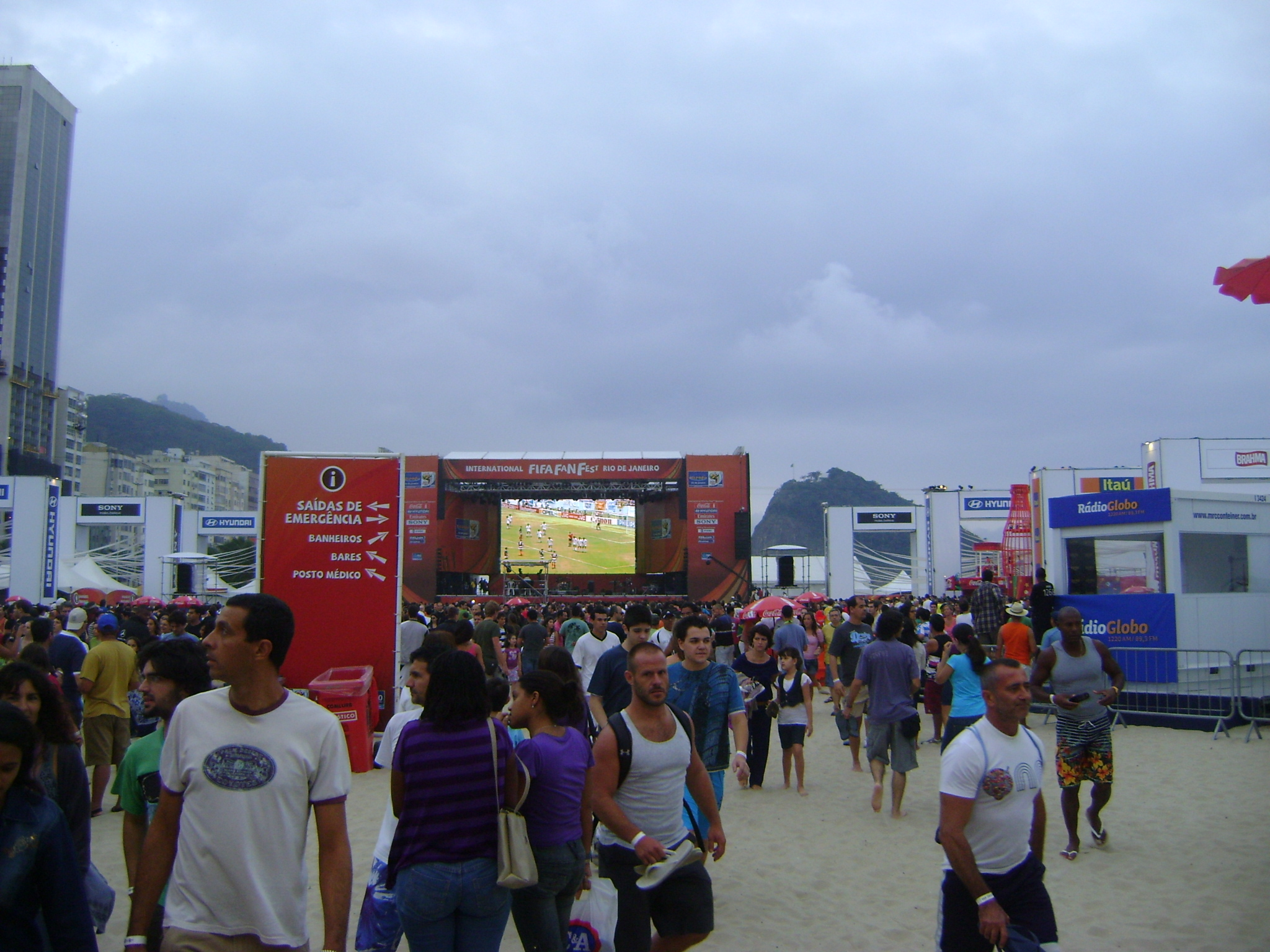
Fans during the 2010 FIFA World Cup match for third place between Germany and Uruguay at the FIFA Fan Fest Arena in Copacabana Beach, Rio de Janeiro.

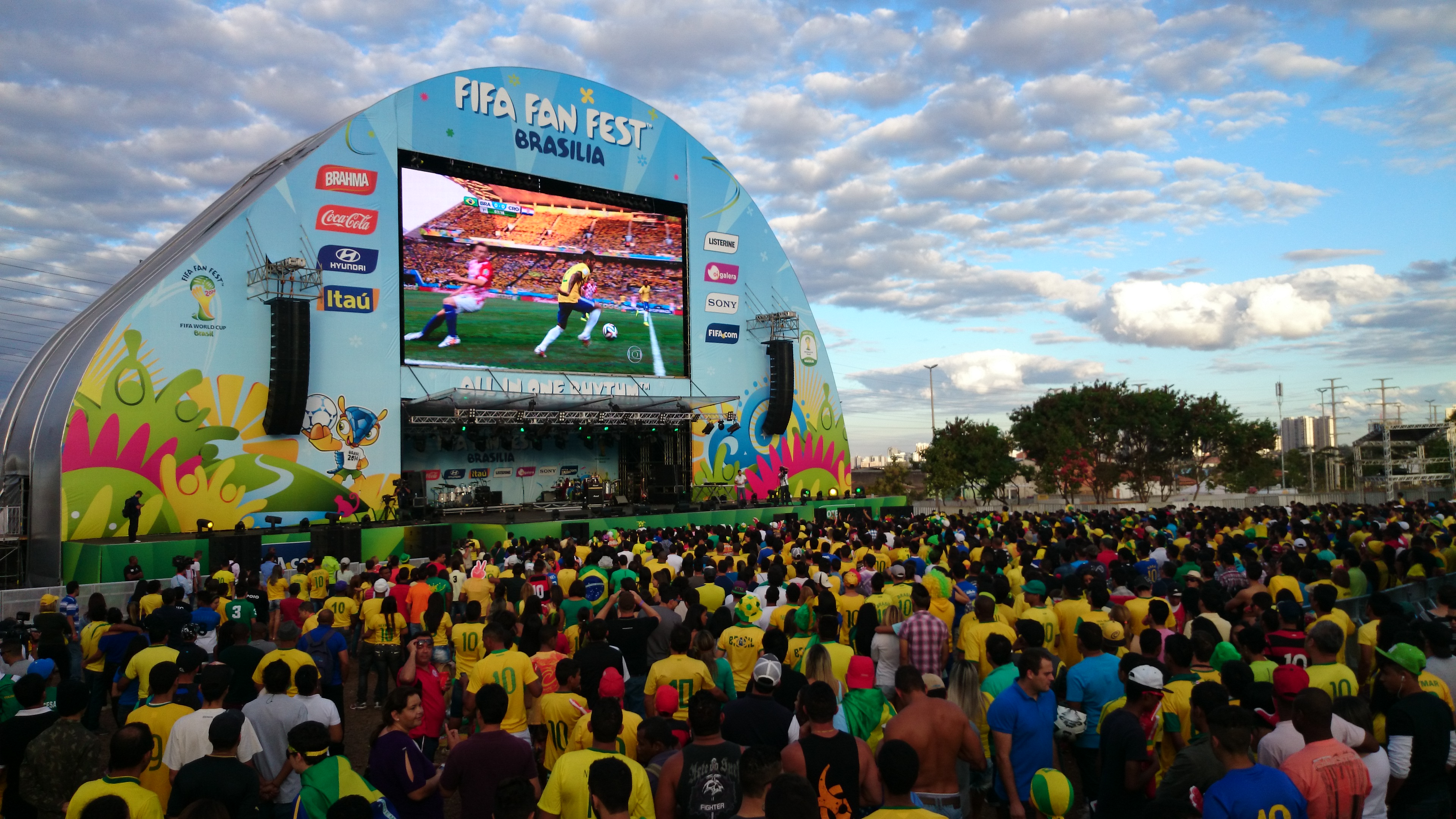
2014 Fan Fest in Brasília, during the opening match Brazil V Croatia.

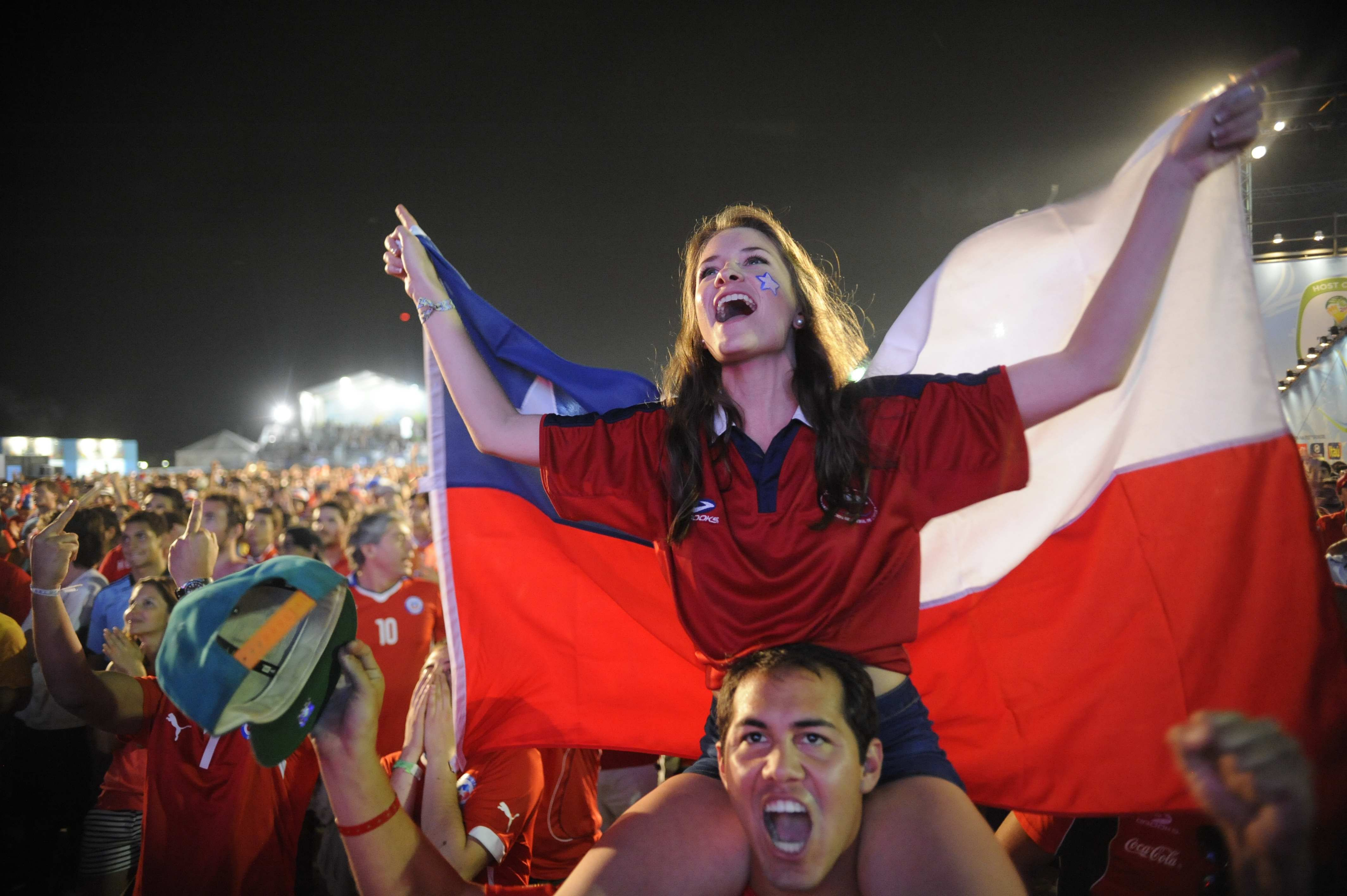
Chile national football team supporters at Rio de Janeiro Fan Fest, 2014.

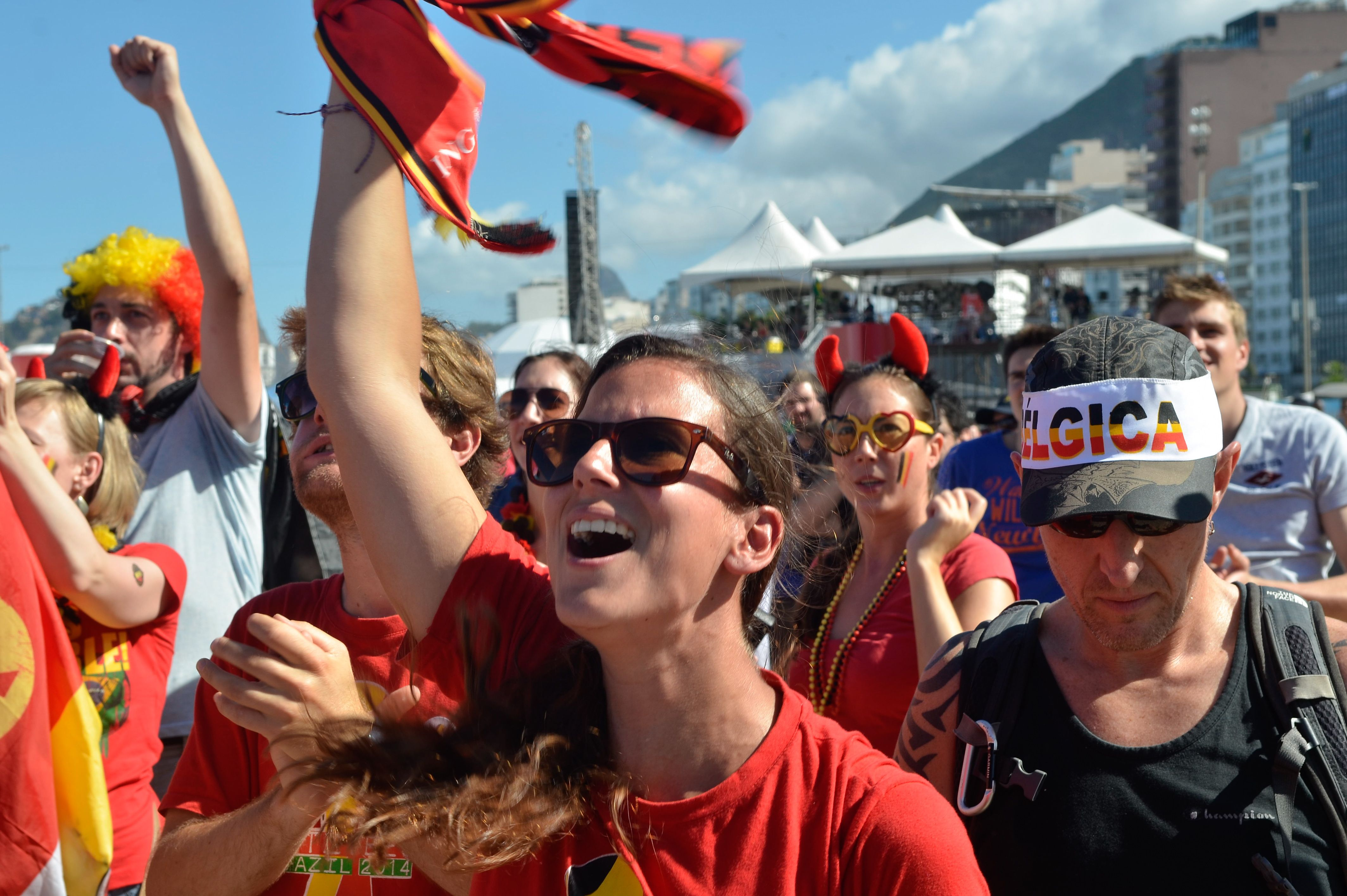
Belgian fans cheering at Rio de Janeiro Fan Fest, 2014.

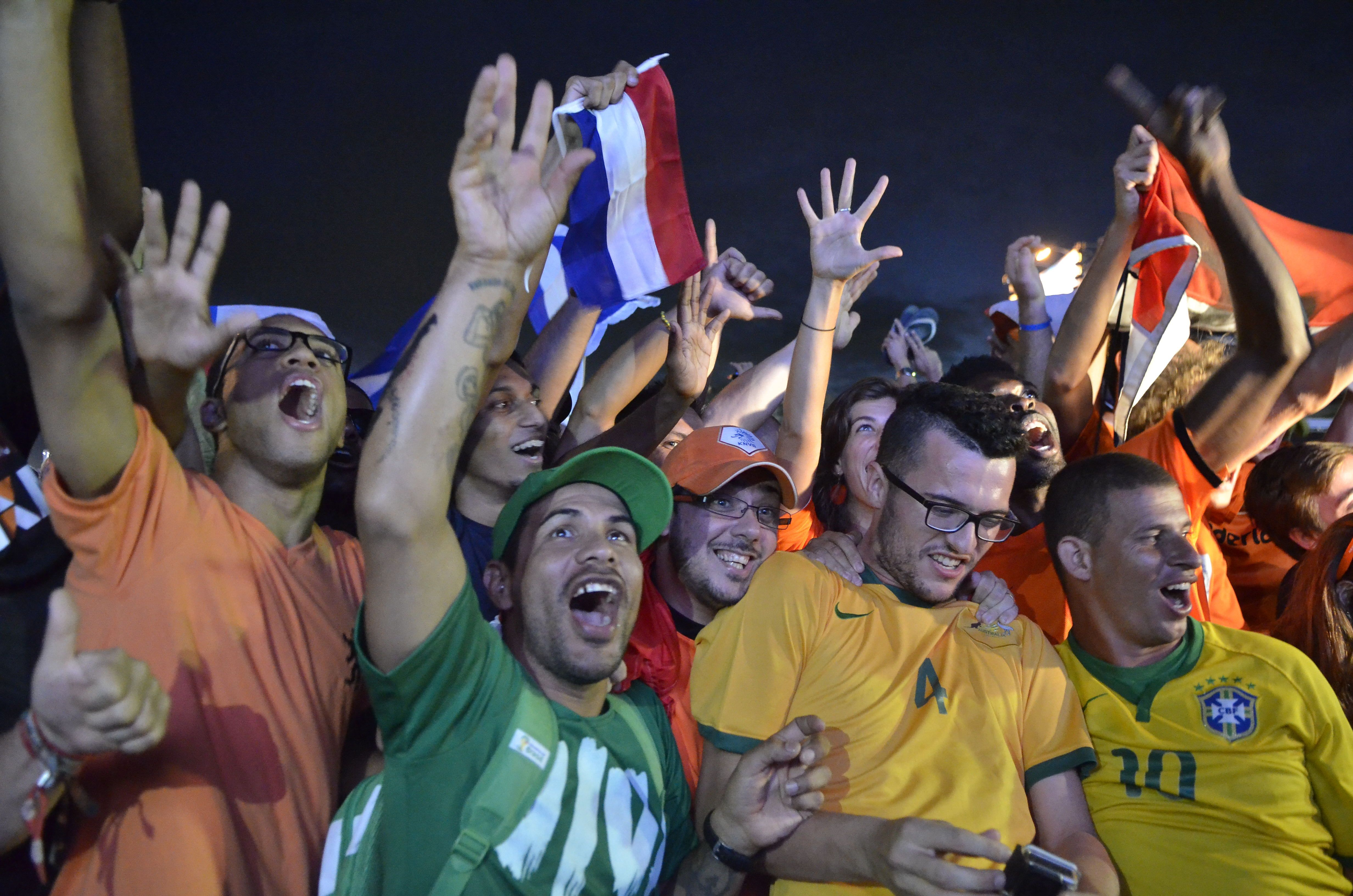
Fans of different origins celebrate at Rio de Janeiro Fan Fest, 2014.
