= Public viewing =

Public viewing may refer to

- Public screening, the showing of moving pictures to an audience in a public place
- Public viewing area, a space set aside for members of the public to safely view sites of interest
