= PWK =

PWK may refer to:

- Chicago Executive Airport (IATA and FAA LID: PWK), a public airport in Wheeling, Illinois, United States
- Purwakarta railway station (Station code: PWK), a class I railway station in Nagritengah, Purwakarta, West Java, Indonesia
