= Hungerball =

Football-based hybrid sport

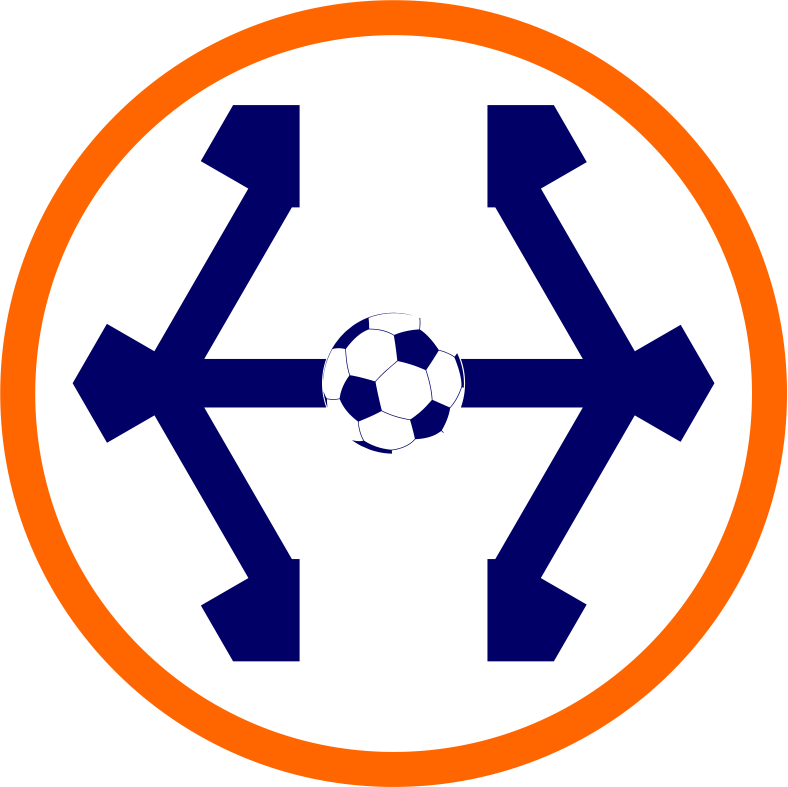
HUNGERBALL logo

Hungerball is a proprietary football-based hybrid sport played in New Zealand, Australia, the United States, Canada and England. Hungerball is played in the exclusive inflatable Hungerball arena.

Hungerball is governed by Sport 2.0 Trust, operating as Hungerball Sport 2.0 Association, and is registered with the WIPO and is trademarked in countries across the world.

== Elements ==
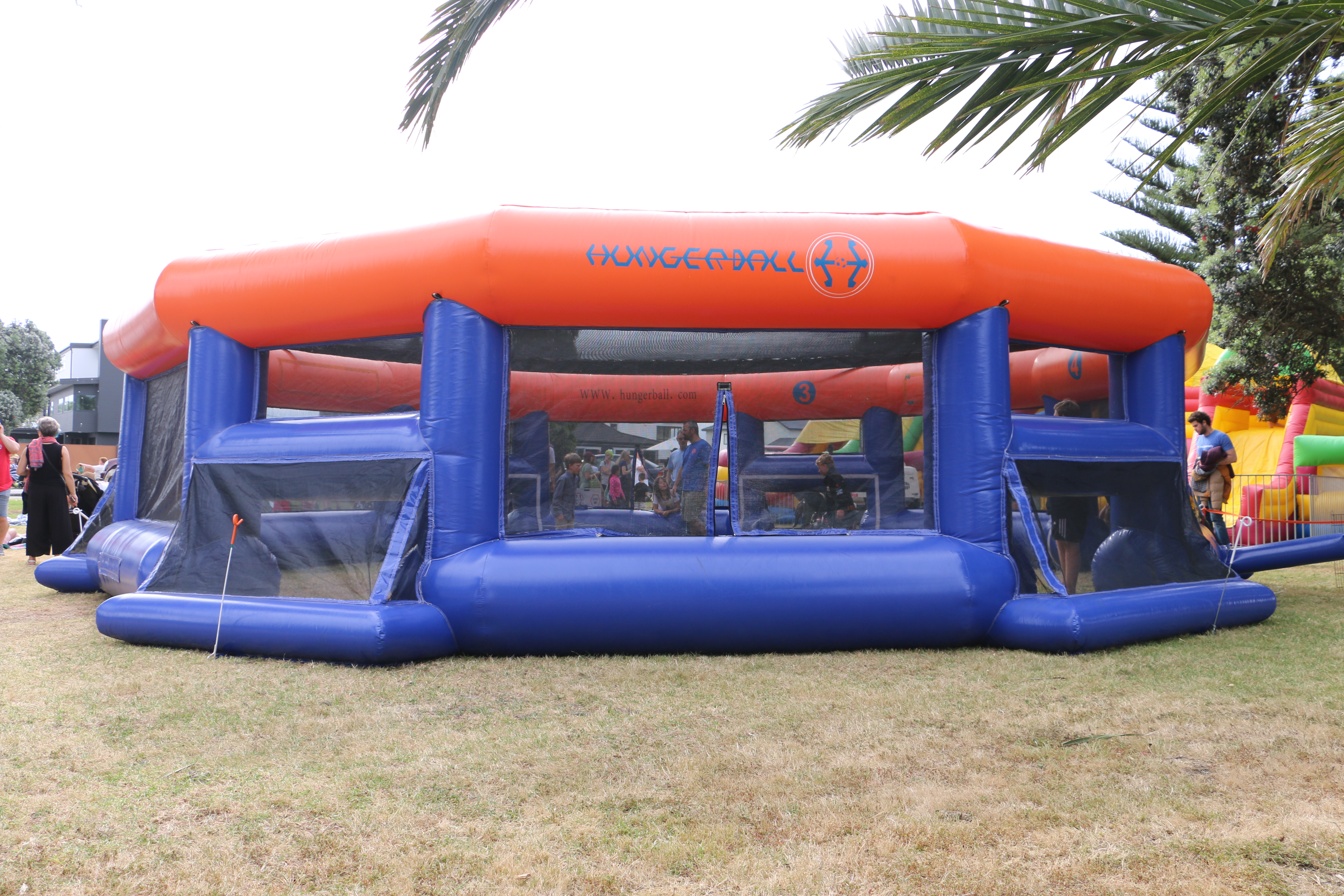
Hungerball is played in an inflatable arena with six goals. Surf Sounds November, 2017

Hungerball is played inside an inflatable, fully enclosed arena, with six small goals.

The game consists of six players, all defending one goal each. In the basic original Hungerball game, one ball is used and players cannot use their hands. In other adaptations, two or more balls may be used and players may be allowed to use their hands. Soft light soft balls are used to make sure sure players of all ages and abilities feel safe given the close range shots.

== Origin ==
Hungerball was created in Auckland, New Zealand. It is based on a game the co-founder and psychologist, Andu Iordache played as a child in Romania, all-in-all, where children played a football game on the street until there was only one person left.

The name Hungerball was created by Andu's son and Hungerball's co-founder Toma Iordache. It comes from the game's aim of improving participants' hunger for possession of the ball.

Hungerball is called Hia Pōro in te reo Māori.

== Early adoption ==
In 2015, Hungerball launched in New Zealand.

Hungerball launched in Brisbane, Australia in 2016 and in Muskoka Woods, Canada in 2018.

In 2017, it was first played by Mangere Refugee Resettlement Centre, church youth groups and tertiary students at AUT.

Refugees as Survivors New Zealand uses Hungerball to provide people from refugee backgrounds with access to quality, culturally-sensitive mental health services to assist with positive resettlement in Aotearoa.

In January 2018, New Zealand national football league team Team Wellington adopted Hungerball as a children's holiday soccer programme.

The game is played at schools in its native country, New Zealand in Auckland, Wellington, Dunedin and Canterbury.

In 2018, Hungerball toured in England and Whitby High School hosted a tournament in September 2018.

The first Hungerball operator in the United States started up in 2023, playing Hungerball in Denver, Colorado. In 2026, Hungerball launched in Canada and in the Northwest region of the United Kingdom.

== Recognition ==
In 2017 Hungerball featured on New Zealand children's programme What Now as part of the Anchor AIMS Games International Sporting Championships. It has featured on the Philippines public news.

Andu Iordache has presented Hungerball in psychology talks centred around athletic development in young children and teenagers.

In 2019, Hungerball was a finalist and runner up in the Innovation in Sport category of the 2019 Massey University Harbour Excellence Awards.

== Types of games ==
There are currently two main types of Hungerball games; "competition" and "social".

During competition games, there are two ways to play:

1. There is a fixed time period. The person who scores the highest number of goals, minus goals conceded - wins.
2. It is played as an elimination challenge. Upon conceding three goals, the player is eliminated until there is only one left, who is then the winner.

During social games, players in large groups use a fast rotation system whereby whoever concedes is replaced by someone in a line waiting to get on the pitch.

There are then multiple social games for players which are based on training and development.

The rules are:

Singles – 1 vs 1 x 6 (Hungerball meets soccer)

- Dice throw decides which of the six players starts from the centre.
- Other players to remain in their goals, can come out once the ball is touched.
- One ball, no hands.
- Players can score in any of the other five goals.
- One point added for each goal scored, one point taken off for goal conceded.
- Own goal counts as goal conceded (only).
- Player who concedes a goal resumes play from the centre.
- Handball sanctioned with penalty shot to empty goal of guilty player from goal of player who last touched ball prior to handball.
- Similarly, fault sanctioned with penalty shot into empty goal of guilty player.
- If responsibility or benefit of fault or handball unable to be established, dice throw to decide who resumes play.

Team

- 2 vs 2 x 3 – two goals per team – similar to challenges for individuals.
- 3 vs 3 – three goals per team, best team wins.

Field hockey adaptation

In New Zealand, Hungerball was adapted to field hockey. It plays with the same rules as the soccer version but with the inclusion of a hockey ball and stick per player instead of a conventional football.

In January 2019, Hungerball was included for use Black Sticks New Zealand fun events.

== Popularity ==
Hungerball has been implemented in professional football teams' training methods, including Team Wellington.

New Zealand soccer club Western AFC included Hungerball in its 2018 Christchurch Fit4football player welfare roadshow.

In 2018, Whitby High School received 7075 GBP from Cheshire Community Foundation to engage learners in Hungerball. The project had a dual purpose of promoting informal exercise of the school population plus focused work with groups of vulnerable learners. The grant paid for equipment and venue hire, and staff time.

Hungerball has been recognized in Germany and Italy, gaining interest in their online communities.

In 2019, Counties Manukau independent KiwiSport Advisory Group awarded funding to Hungerball, to help provide new or increased organised sport opportunities for young people aged 5 to 18 years. The third round of 2019 regional KiwiSport funding applications, provided further funding to make Hungerball accessible across the Auckland region. In 2021, Hungerball was funded by Aktive NZ to make the sport accessible to Auckland schools.

In 2020, Hungerball New Zealand partnered with The Sir Ray Avery Foundation to promote Amigo Nutrition and physical exercise for New Zealand children. In the same year, Hungerball was first played by vulnerable students at Rosehill Satellite Unit, Papakura High School, using soft equipment and using any skills to score or block goals.

Hungerball is played at community events. In 2021, it was a feature of New Zealand Eid Day celebration at Auckland's Eden Park and in 2024, it was included in Auckland Live's Playweek, Play in the Square festival. Hungerball collaborates with other organisations such as Friends of Football to support for innovative football projects that might otherwise not proceed.

When the FIFA Women's World Cup was hosted in New Zealand and Australia in 2023, Hungerball was one of the games offered at the FIFA Fan Festivals.

In 2023, Selwyn United Football Club in Rollerston, New Zealand offered Hungerball as an afterschool event for nine to twelve year old club members. Hungerball has been played at school holiday programmes, including, The Y at Hamilton Recreation Centre, the Sunnynook Community Centre and the Out and About programme managed by Auckland Council. In 2023, SportsNation shared a video of Team Wellington playing Hungerball.

In Australia, Hungerball was used as the location for a live weather forecast broadcast by Nine Network in 2024.

Hungerball has been one of the sports included in the annual CM Games since the inaugural event in 2022. Held at Bruce Pulman Park, Takanini, the CM Games give Years 5-8 students from South Auckland schools the opportunity to participate in several sports. Hungerball is played in several variations of the game: soccer, pool noodle hockey and endgame, played for five minutes each.

In 2024, Hungerball was played at Iqra School, New Lynn, Auckland, to encourage students to embrace a healthy competitive spirit while building camaraderie, teamwork and communication.

Since 2024, Hungerball has been played at the annual Halberg Games, sport and recreation for kiwis with physical disabilities, and in 2026 Hungerball ran a competition day for all abilities.

In 2025, Hungerball was played at Colorado festivals and Sunlive at Tauranga.

In July 2025, a Hungerball video went viral on Instagram and Andu Iordache was interviewed by Jesse Mulligan on Radio New Zealand about the game.

== Research ==
In 2024, Dr Richard Keith Wright, AUT Centre for Active Ageing, Auckland University of Technology presented a paper, “Feed the fun”: assessing the social return on investment (SROI) attached to Hungerball, at the Leisure Studies Association (LSA) Conference 2024, hosted by the University of the West of Scotland. He stated, "Whilst many of the existing games focus on facilitating fun physical activity that enhances social capital through connection and inclusion, the stakeholders analysis reveals an opportunity for Hungerball to also incorporate games that require players to be innovative, adaptive and problem-solvers (under pressure)."

== See also ==
- Hybrid sports
- Handball
