= Chicago Executive Airport =

Airport in Cook County, Illinois, US

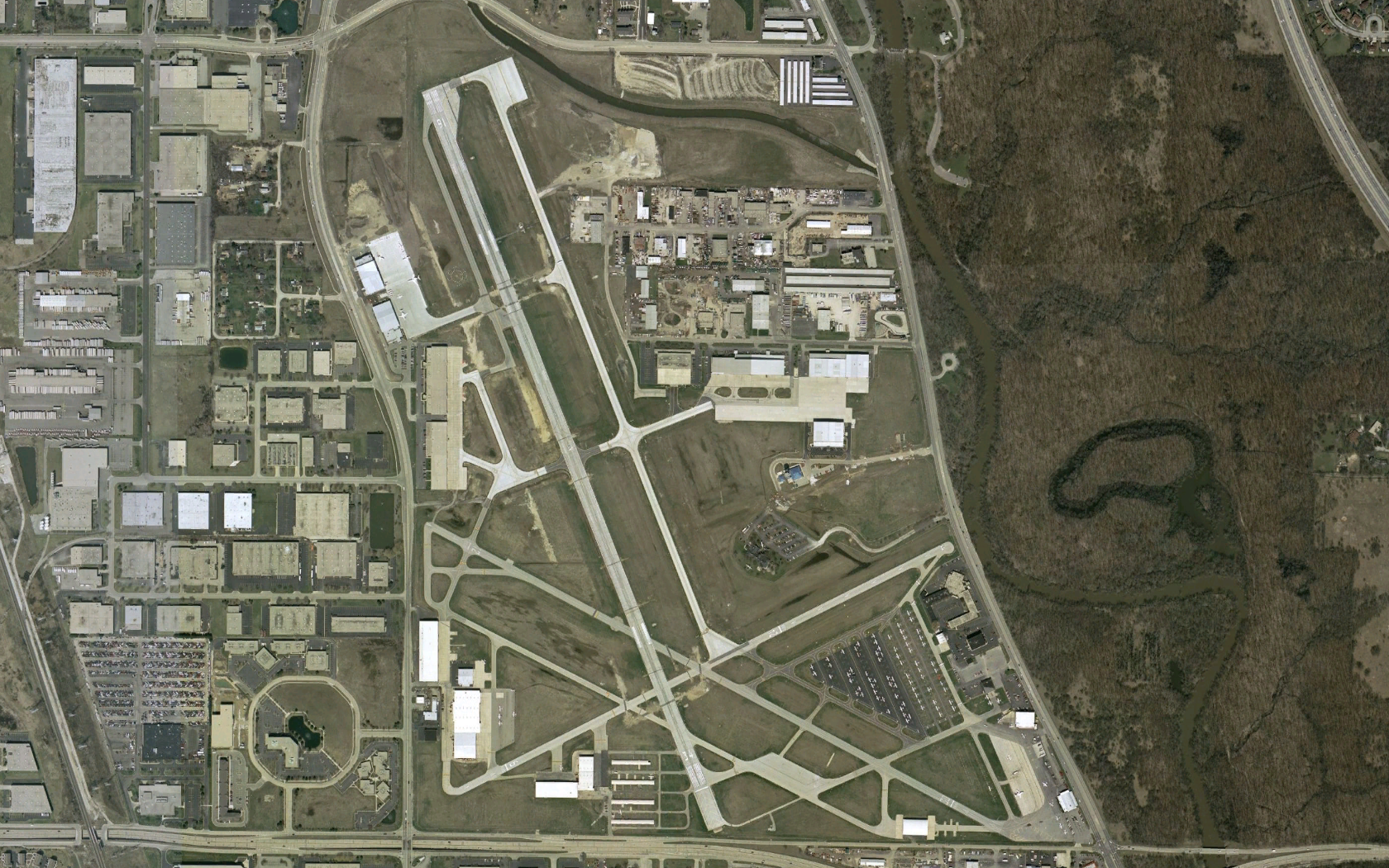
- USGS aerial image
- IATA: PWK; ICAO: KPWK; FAA LID: PWK

Summary
- Airport type: Public
- Owner: City of Prospect Heights and Village of Wheeling
- Serves: Chicago
- Location: Wheeling, Illinois
- Built: 1926
- Time zone: Central Time (UTC-6)
- Elevation AMSL: 647 ft (197 m)
- Coordinates: 42°06′51″N 087°54′06″W
- Website: www.chiexec.com

Map
- Location of airport in Illinois PWK (the United States)

Runways
Direction	Length		Surface
Direction	ft	m	Surface
16/34	5,001	1,524	Grooved Asphalt
12/30	4,415	1,346	Grooved Asphalt
6/24	3,677	1,121	Grooved Asphalt

Statistics (2022)
- Aircraft operations (year ending March 31, 2022): 108,203
- Based aircraft: 259
- Source: FAA, airport website

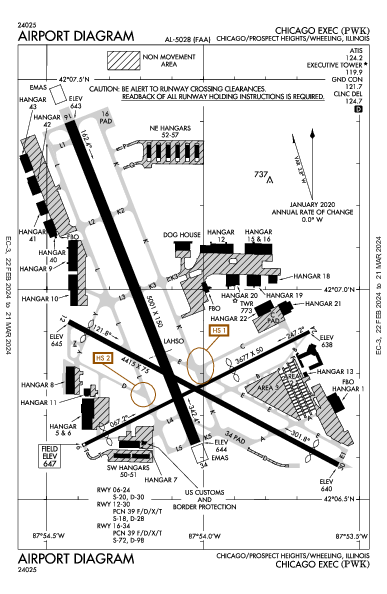
FAA Diagram of KPWK (31 Oct. 2024)

Chicago Executive Airport (IATA: PWK, ICAO: KPWK, FAA LID: PWK), formerly Palwaukee Municipal Airport, is a public airport 18 miles (33 km) northwest of Chicago, in the village of Wheeling in Cook County, Illinois, United States. It is owned by the City of Prospect Heights and the Village of Wheeling.

The airport logs over 77,000 take-offs and landings each year and is the fourth busiest airport in Illinois.

== History ==
=== Early history ===
The airport opened in 1926 as Gauthier's Flying Field, and was shortly renamed to Swallow Airplane Field, after an OX-5 Swallow aircraft based there. It was named Pal-Waukee in November 1928 because of its location near the intersection of Palatine Road and Milwaukee Avenue.

In 1933, the airport housed the Goodyear Blimp during the Century of Progress World's Fair. The Blimp performed sightseeing tours throughout the event, and a wooden hangar at Executive was used for maintenance and storage.

Soon after World War II, the airport's first gravel runway was added. 70 hangars, which are still in use as of July 2026, were built to add room for post-war flying demand.

In 1953, the airport was purchased by George J. Priester, who developed the airport over the next 33 years, installing paved runways, lighting, hangars, and an air traffic control tower. In 1986, George's son Charlie negotiated the sale of the airport to the cities of Wheeling and Prospect Heights, and it was renamed Palwaukee Municipal Airport.

Sally Strempel, a female pioneer in aviation, bought a flight school in 1950 at Palwaukee Airport. She renamed it Sally's Flying School and retained it until 1966. Strempel was a member of the Illinois Aviation Hall of Fame and was the first woman in Illinois and one of the first five nationally to be designated by the Federal Aviation Administration as a flight instructor who could give private and commercial exams to student pilots.

=== Late 20th & early 21st century ===
The airport was sold to the City of Prospect Heights and Village of Wheeling to keep it from closing. The airport's first air traffic control tower was built in 1997.

Charlie Priester kept an FBO at the airport, along with a charter company called Priester Aviation. Priester sold the FBO to Signature Flight Support in 2001, and he turned over operational control of Priester Charter to his son Andy in 2004.

In August 2006, trustees from the village of Wheeling and aldermen from the City Council of Prospect Heights voted to approve a name change. On October 17, 2006, Palwaukee Municipal Airport was renamed Chicago Executive Airport.

=== 2010-present ===
In October 2015, Cincinnati-based Ultimate Air Shuttle announced plans to begin service from the airport to Cincinnati/Northern Kentucky International Airport in January or February 2016.

In late 2021, the airport received $1.1 million to make facility upgrades.

The airport's Customs and Border Protection (CBP) facility was named the 2022 General Aviation Airport Architectural Project of the Year by the American Association of Airport Executives. The facility opened in October 2021.

The airport is developing plans to upgrade its administration building, saying it has outgrown its current facility. The new building will house administrative offices, Civil Air Patrol facilities, and college classrooms.

== Facilities and aircraft ==
=== Facilities ===
The airport covers 411 acres (166 ha) at an elevation of 647 feet (197 m). It has three asphalt paved runways: 6/24 is 3,677 by 50 feet (1,121 x 15 m); 12/30 is 4,415 by 75 feet (1,346 x 23 m); 16/34 is 5,001 by 150 feet (1,524 x 46 m).

Plans have been brought up to close Runway 6/24 in order to reconcile multiple "hot spots," which are areas with a history of potential risk of collision or runway incursion. Airport leaders argue that closing the runway will make it more difficult for small planes to land in strong east/west winds, as 6/24 is the airport's only east–west runway.

Tenants of the airport include three national fixed-base operators: Atlantic Aviation, Signature Flight Support, Chicago Private Jet Charters and Hawthorne Global Aviation Services, who provide fueling and handling for transient aircraft and a significant portion of the locally based aircraft. Priester Air Charter, Palwaukee Flyers, and several smaller firms and aircraft operators are also present.

In 2007, Chicago Executive's management created a public viewing area east of the south end of Runway 16-34 along Palatine Frontage Road, with lighted parking, a picnic table, and bleacher seating. A bulletin board has a copy of the current FAA chart, posters for events and educational information. The area is open 24/7.

==== SkyHarbour Development ====
When Runway 6/24 is fully closed, construction will begin on a new Sky Harbour campus to provide hangars, fueling, ground power, maintenance, and more for ultra-high-net-worth tenants who want additional privacy during their travels. The Sky Harbour Group Corporation will call the facility a "Home Base Operator" as a play off the "Fixed Base Operator" name.

The airport estimates a $550 million economic benefit and aims to house 20 key privately-owned aircraft. Facilities will include dedicated offices, eight hangars, and ground support equipment all spread over 130,000 feet at the airport.

=== Aircraft ===
For the year ending March 31, 2022, the airport had an average of 296 aircraft movements per day, or 108,203 per year: 80% general aviation, 20% air taxi and less than 1% military and commercial. For the same time frame, there were 259 aircraft based at this airport: 149 single-engine airplanes, 81 jet aircraft, 20 multi-engine airplanes, and 4 helicopters.

The airport can handle executive jets in the 20-seat range, such as the Grumman Gulfstream and the Bombardier Challenger, and larger aircraft sometimes visit. Occasionally, military transport aircraft, such as the Lockheed C-130, use the airport when carrying service members to local facilities such as Great Lakes Naval Training Center or the North Chicago V.A. Hospital.

== Accidents and incidents ==
- On October 30, 1996, a twin engine Gulfstream IV business jet with three crew members and one passenger lost control upon takeoff and crashed immediately to the north of the airport. All four aboard perished.
- On January 30, 2006, an eight-seat twin engine Cessna 421B with four passengers crashed about 1 mile (1,600 m) south of the airport. The aircraft was heading from Kansas to Palwaukee. There were no survivors.
- On January 5, 2010, a Learjet 35A crashed into the Des Plaines River in the Cook County Forest Preserve about 1 mile (1,600 m) south of the airport while on final approach. The jet, operated by Royal Air Freight, Inc., of Waterford, Michigan, was empty at the time of the crash. The pilot and co-pilot were killed.
- On November 28, 2011, a Piper PA-31 crashed on approach to Chicago Executive Airport. The aircraft was operating as a medical transport plane. The pilot, the patient, and the patient's wife were killed in the crash. Two other people on board survived. NTSB investigators determined the accident to be caused by "the pilot's inadequate preflight planning and in-flight decision-making, which resulted in a loss of engine power due to fuel exhaustion during approach." The pilot's decision to operate the aircraft after using marijuana was also cited as a contributing factor in the crash.
- On August 12, 2021, a Robinson R-44 helicopter crashed while taking off from Executive. The pilot reported their engined revved and shut down under 300 feet (100 m) above the ground, the aircraft crashed on Milwaukee Avenue, the sole pilot onboard received minor injuries. The accident is under investigation.
- On November 21, 2021, a Cessna 172 Skyhawk operated by a local flight school veered off the runway while landing and came to rest on an infield next to the runway. The sole pilot onboard was not injured. Damage was reported to the plane's propeller and nose wheel in addition to a reported fuel leak.
- On June 30, 2022, a Cessna Citation Sovereign struck multiple parked aircraft while trying to taxi along Executive's Taxiway F. Substantial damage to aircraft involved was reported, but there were no injuries.
- On November 7, 2022, a Learjet 60 crashed on landing at Chicago Executive. It overran the runway after landing on runway 30 instead of runway 34. Runway 30 was found to be insufficient for the aircraft's required landing distance. The flight crew rushed through landing checks and never confirmed whether they were aligned with the correct runway.
- On September 3, 2025, a Gulfstream G150 overran the runway while landing at the Chicago Executive Airport.

== Ground transportation ==
While no public transit service is provided directly to the airport, Pace provides bus service nearby.

== See also ==
- List of airports in Illinois
- Wheeling station

== Other sources ==
- "School's new home forces small airport to shut runway". The Chicago Tribune. 2007-04-19.
- "Pilots lobby to block plan to close suburban runway". The Chicago Tribune. 2007-04-25.
