= Squares of Saransk Center =

Saransk is the capital of the Republic of Mordovia, an administrative republic of Russia. It is the center of commerce and finance, culture, sports and entertainment in the Republic. Saransk is one of the cleanest and greenest cities in Mordovia and Russia as a whole. There are 4 main squares in the city center, Kommunisticheskaya Square, Sovetskaya Square, Privokzalnaya Square and Square of Victory.

== Sovetskaya Square ==
Sovetskaya square is the main square in Saransk. It is located in the center of the city on Sovetskaya street, at the crossroads of Tolstoy street, Volodarsky street, Moskovskaya street and Lenin Prospect. The square was made in the middle of 17th century. The place has had various names during different periods of time - Sobornaya (Cathedral Square), Sobornaya-Torgovaya (Cathedral and Trade Square), Bazarnaya (Market Square) and Verhne-Bazarnaya (Upper-Market Square). The first name is dated to the time when Saransk was founded. In Russian tradition every church was supposed to have a square beside it, so Sobornaya Square was made next to the church on the hill. In 1852 a great part of Saransk burnt down and many churches were destroyed. After a while a tradesman Ivan Krotkov started the construction of a new one. It took a long time to build it and many townspeople supported him financially. The Spassky Cathedral was finally finished in 1885 looking after Christ the Saviour Cathedral in Moscow. A new Sobornaya square became bigger including two other minor squares - Rozhdestvenskaya (Christmas Square) and Bazarnaya (Market Square). In the second half of the 19th century the large area in Bazarnaya Street was called Sobornaya, Rozhdestvenskaya and Bazarnaya squares. In the end of the 19th century and in the beginning of the 20th century, the number of sales outlets, new buildings and houses were built on the square. The name "Bazarnaya Square" became commonly used. After the Revolution the oldest city square was renamed into Revolution Square. It became the main place to hold public events, demonstrations, meetings, processions and the Red Army parades in Saransk. The modern name of the square, Sovetskaya Square, has been used since 1919. It is located in front of the Ushakov Cathedral.

== Kommunisticheskaya Square ==
Kommunisticheskaya Square is located between Bolshevistskaya street, Kommunisticheskaya street and Lenin Prospect. The square was the result of the reconstruction of the city center. Before that the territory had had the constructions newsstands, wooden sidewalks and houses of old residents of Saransk. On the northern side there is the administrative building of the Council of Ministers of Mordovia and Hotel "Saransk". Green lawns, flowerbeds and the fountain "Oduvanchik" ("Dandelion") were made there in 1979 giving the square a nice look.

== Privokzalnaya Square ==
In 1893 the railway and a railway station were built in Saransk. The railway station was one-storeyed, stone-built with wooden outbuildings in the northern and southern sides and Privokzalnaya square in the western part. After World War II the station was reconstructed. The draft of the restructuring interior and exterior design were made by the team of Kyiv Association "Artist". It included the waiting room, the transit passengers hall, a newspaper stand, a café, a buffet, a production of the room were housed. On the second floor there were the hotel rooms for passengers. In the middle of the square there is a monument to the stratosphere fliers monument to the stratosphere fliers constructed in honour of the heroes A. Vasenko, P. Fedoseenko and Ilya Usyskin.

== Square of Victory ==
The Square of Victory got its name in 1972. It is located in the city center on the Sovetskaya street, limited by Bolshevistskaya and Tolstoy streets. There is a monument which is constructed in honour of the soldiers of the Republic of Mordovia, killed during World War II. The Square of Victory is lined with trees from the east and west sides. There are buildings of the Executive Committee of the city Council and a department store.
