= Black Sticks =

Black Sticks is the nickname for both the New Zealand national field hockey teams.

It may refer to:

- New Zealand men's national field hockey team, also known as the Black Sticks Men
- New Zealand women's national field hockey team, also known as the Black Sticks Women
