= Grumman Gulfstream =

Grumman Gulfstream were a family of aircraft produced by Grumman. The line is continued by Gulfstream Aerospace, now a division of General Dynamics.

- Grumman Gulfstream I
- Grumman Gulfstream II
- Gulfstream III
- Gulfstream G400/G450
- Gulfstream G500/G550
