= Public and private screening =

Showing film or video to an audience

A public screening is the showing of films, sporting events, and music concerts to an audience in a public place. The event screened may be live or recorded, free or paid, and may use film, video, or a broadcast method such as satellite or closed-circuit television. Private screening refers to the screening of a commercially licensed film or media content to a group of people somewhere other than one of their homes. Private screening can be legally complex, as the distribution rights or broadcasting rights and regulations vary from country to country.

== Germany ==
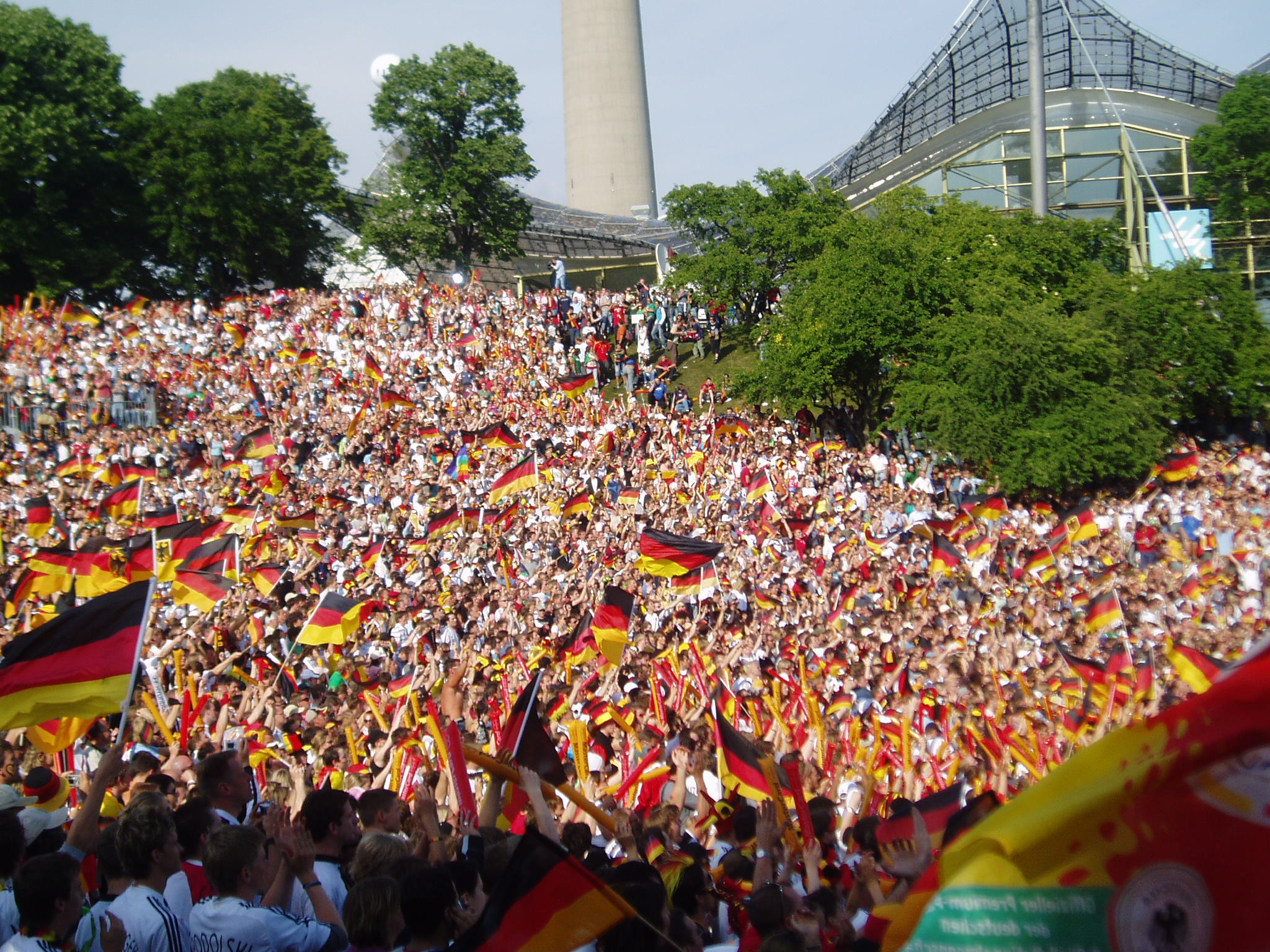
Fans at the 2006 FIFA World Cup at the Olympiapark, Munich

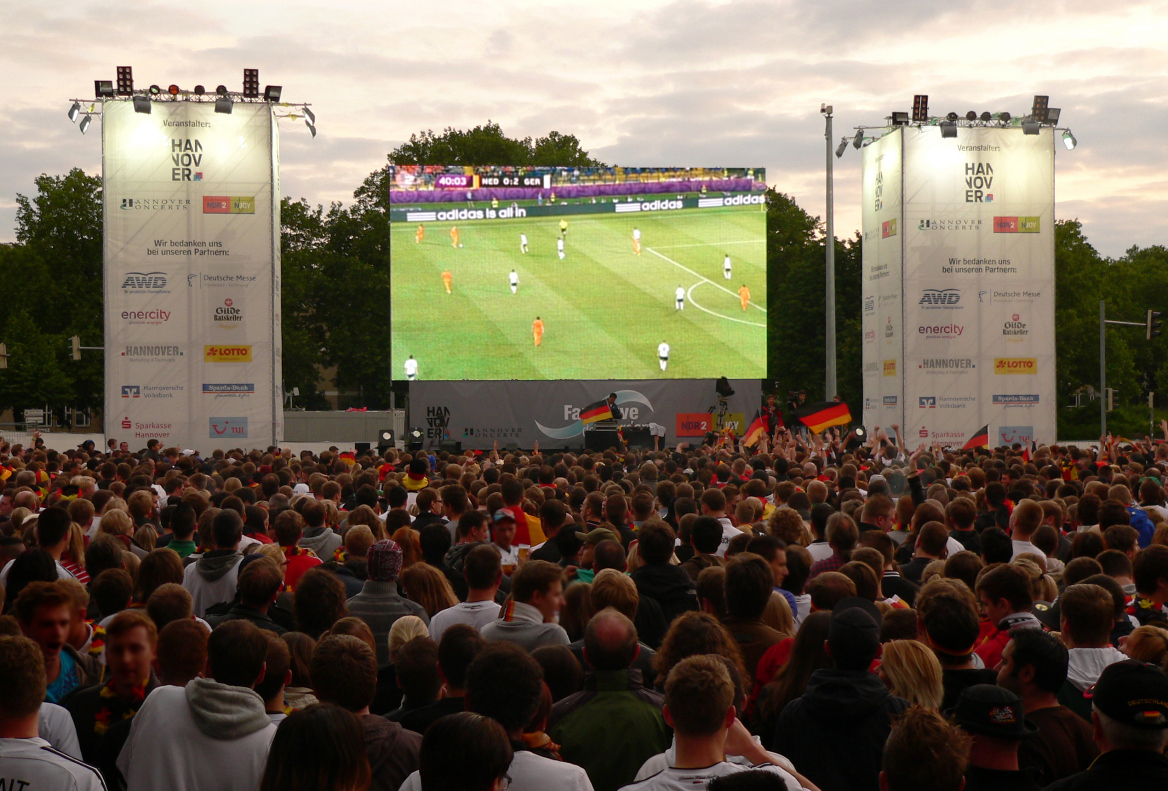
Screening of UEFA Euro 2012 in Hannover

Live public screenings of association football matches, called "Public Viewing", became especially popular at the 2006 FIFA World Cup in Germany.

== United Kingdom ==
Showing a video to a group of people outside of the home is legally regarded as a public showing, and is therefore in breach of copyright for DVDs/videos that have been purchased or hired for domestic use. To organise a group screening, permission from the copyright owner of the title in question will need to be obtained. Obtaining such rights clearances can be a complex procedure.

For certain types of screening ("non-theatrical" screening), it is possible to hire a copy of a film from its distributor with the rights already cleared. The primary non-theatrical distributors of feature films on DVD, video and 16mm in Britain are the BFI and Filmbank Distributors.

Another option is to buy a blanket licence for the year known as a 'Public Video Screening Licence' which may work out cheaper if showing film is to be a regular event.

== See also ==
- Fan zone
- Film screening
- Film festival
