= Public viewing area =

Space for the public to safely view sites of interest

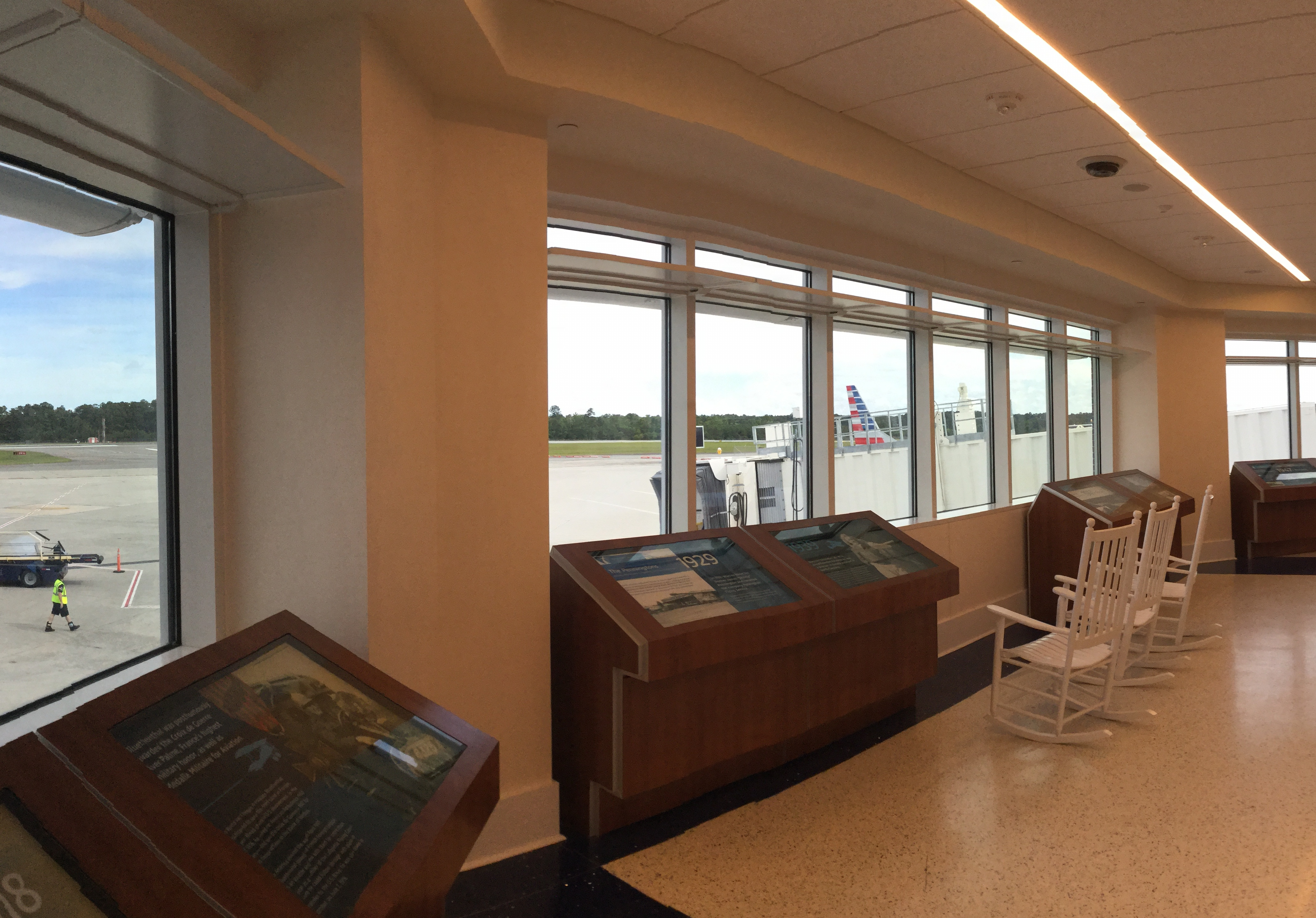
Viewing area at Wilmington International Airport

A public viewing area is a space set aside for members of the public to safely view sites of interest, such as airports, railways, construction sites or other facilities. Sometimes they are known as visitor centers or interpretive sites.

In locations that have inherent dangers and would not normally be accessible to the public, viewing areas provide a way to satiate the public curiosity without exposing inordinate risk. Many sites contain descriptive signs, viewing pavilions, picnic facilities, toilets, radio receivers and brochures.

Some areas of interest, such as airports, railway crossings and depots and maritime facilities have publicly accessible live camera streams, either free or by subscription. Some are hosted by Youtube or other platforms and some may be viewed on the provider's own platform or website. Several of the sites listed in this article also have live cameras.These include "Virtual Railfan", "Steel Highway", "Live Trains" and "Railstream" among others offer these live cameras. Some of these also have scanner audio for monitoring radio communications.

== Examples ==
=== Airports ===
- Austin-Bergstrom International Airport (KAUS), Family Viewing Area is located near the State Aircraft Pooling Board (fancy talk for where aircraft belonging to the State of Texas gets maintained and stored) at the end of Golf Course Road. and faces west to runway 17L/35R. The Family Viewing Area also has paved parking, grassy areas, a picnic table.
- Baltimore–Washington International Airport (KBWI), has the Thomas A Dixon Jr Aircraft Observation Park located just to the south of Dorsey Road which is a viewing area complete with parking, picnic tables, trash cans, and a playground. The BWI Loop Trail also runs through the park.
- Charlotte-Douglas International Airport (KCLT) in Charlotte, North Carolina has the Charlotte Airport Overlook which is located on the west side of the airport on Old Dowd Road, near the threshold of 18C. It is also equipped with a large parking lot, benches and picnic tables.
- Chicago Executive Airport (Palwaukee) (KPWK) in Wheeling, Illinois, has a public viewing area along Palatine Frontage Road that allows the public to view aircraft operations at the airport and provides seating, parking and airport information. A speaker with Air Traffic Control radio operations allows visitors to hear the planes and control tower.
- Dallas/Fort Worth International Airport (KDFW) has a public viewing area located at Founders Plaza. The 6-acre (2.4 ha) plaza features a granite monument and sculpture, post-mounted binoculars, piped-in voices of air traffic controllers and shade pavilions. In 2010, a memorial honoring Delta Air Lines Flight 191 was dedicated at the plaza.
- Mitchell International Airport (KMKE) in Milwaukee, WI has a public viewing area located on the north edge of the airport along Layton Avenue providing parking and rebroadcast of ATC communications.
- Harry Reid International Airport (KLAS) in Paradise, Nevada (Las Vegas) (formerly McCarren) has a viewing area along Sunset Road next to the longest two runways at the airport. Tower communications are available on FM radios.
- Minneapolis-St. Paul International Airport (KMSP) has a viewing area located at the end of Cargo Road next to the FedEx Shipping Center where plane spotters can see aircraft land and take off from two different runways. Picnic tables, trash cans, and parking are provided.
- Van Nuys Airport has a public viewing center on the east side of the airport near the intersection of Woodley Ave. and Waterman Drive.

=== Railroads ===
- Rochelle, Illinois, has built a public viewing area at the crossing of the Union Pacific and BNSF railroads there, complete with an elevated shelter, parking lot, gift shop, toilet facilities and BBQ grills. They pipe in railroad radio audio on 106.9 MHz so visitors can listen to the radio traffic on FM radios. Virtual Railfan and Trains magazine each sponsors a webcam to allow viewing via the Internet.
- Folkston, Georgia has a small but well-appointed viewing area, overlooking the "Folkston Funnel", a stretch of track where two CSX lines have combined for a large amount of rail traffic. The shelter itself has some chairs, rail radio broadcasts, ample parking and electrical outlets for charging camera batteries. The only amenity it lacks is a restroom, but there is a McDonald's within a block that is railfan friendly. Highlights of viewing include up to 60 trains a day, including the auto train and the Tropicana juice train.
- Homewood, Illinois has built a public viewing platform at the south end of the CN (former Illinois Central) Markham Yard. This location is on the east side of the tracks and is connected by a tunnel under the tracks to the Homewood Metra / Amtrak station. Near the station is a static display of an IC GP10 and caboose. There is a Starbucks coffee shop on the other side of Harwood Avenue from the viewing platform and there are several restaurants within an easy walk in downtown Homewood.

=== Locks and dams ===
Many lock and dam facilities along the various rivers in the US have public viewing areas. An example is the Hoover Dam near Boulder City, Nevada, on the Colorado River, has an extremely large interpretive center and tour facility.

=== Construction sites ===
These are, by necessity, often temporary in nature. Harkening back to the "knotholes" in fences used by passersby to view the progress of a site, some large projects provide a glimpse into the construction by intentionally placing viewing ports in fences, often geared toward selling space in the final project.

=== Sports venues ===
Some stadiums provide locations where the public can view games in progress without entering the stadium or paying for an admission. AT&T Park in San Francisco, California, home of the San Francisco Giants has such an area.
