= 2010–11 Newcastle Jets FC (women) season =

Newcastle Jets (W-League)
2010–11 season
- Chairman: Ken Edwars
- Head Coach: Wayne O'Sullivan
- Stadium: Wanderers Oval
- W-League: 6th
- W-League Finals: DNQ
- Top goalscorer: Tara Andrews (7)
- Biggest win: 7–1 vs. Adelaide United (H) (8 January 2011); W-League
- Biggest defeat: 0–4 vs. Brisbane Roar (H) (20 November 2010); W-League

The 2010–11 season was Newcastle Jets Football Club (W-League)'s third season, in the W-League. Newcastle Jets finished 6th in their W-League season.

== Players ==
Note: Flags indicate national team as defined under FIFA eligibility rules; some limited exceptions apply. Players may hold more than one non-FIFA nationality.

No.	Pos.	Nation	Player
1	GK	AUS	Alison Logue
2	DF	AUS	Libby Sharpe
3	DF	USA	Nicole Cross
4	DF	AUS	Thea Slatyer
5	DF	AUS	Alex Hyung
6	MF	AUS	Amber Neilson
7	MF	AUS	Gema Simon
8	MF	AUS	Bronte Bates
9	FW	AUS	Kate Hensman
10	MF	AUS	Hayley Crawford
11	FW	AUS	Sasha McDonnell

No.	Pos.	Nation	Player
12	MF	AUS	Melissa Feuregill
13	DF	AUS	Carlie Ikonomou
14	DF	AUS	Hannah Brewer
15	MF	AUS	Nicole Jones
16	DF	AUS	Kirstyn Pearce
17	MF	AUS	Madeline Searl
18	FW	AUS	Leia Smith
19	FW	AUS	Tara Andrews
20	MF	AUS	Kara Mowbray
21	MF	AUS	Renee Cartwright
22	GK	USA	Alli Lipsher

== Transfers ==
=== Transfers in ===
No.	Position	Name	From	Type/fee	Date	Ref.
3	DF	(United States) Nicole Cross	(United States) LA Pride	Free transfer	14 October 2010	
4	DF	Thea Slatyer	Canberra United	Free transfer	14 October 2010	
5	DF	Alex Hyung	Free agent	Free transfer	14 October 2010	
9	FW	Kate Hensman	Free agent	Free transfer	14 October 2010	
11	FW	Sasha McDonnell	Brisbane Roar	Free transfer	14 October 2010	
12	MF	Melissa Feuregill	(United States)	Free transfer	14 October 2010	
20	MF	Kara Mowbray	Melbourne Victory	Free transfer	14 October 2010	
22	GK	(United States) Alli Lipsher	(United States) Boston Breakers	Free transfer	14 October 2010	

=== Transfers out ===
No.	Position	Name	From	Type/fee	Date	Ref.
3	DF	Pelay Ingles	Sydney FC	Free transfer	14 October 2010	
4	DF	Loren Mahoney	Sydney FC	Free transfer	14 October 2010	
5	DF	Stacey Day	Adelaide United	Free transfer	14 October 2010	
12	FW	Emma Stewart	Free agent	Free transfer	14 October 2010	
13	FW	Caitlyn Jarvie	Free agent	Free transfer	14 October 2010	
20	GK	Emma-Kate Dewhurst	Free agent	Free transfer	14 October 2010	

== Competitions ==
=== Overall record ===
Competition	First match	Last match	Starting round	Final position	Record							
Competition	First match	Last match	Starting round	Final position	Pld	W	D	L	GF	GA	GD	Win %
W-League	6 November 2010	29 January 2011	Matchday 1	6th	10	3	1	6	13	15	−2	30.00
Total					10	3	1	6	13	15	−2	30.00

Source: Competitions

=== W-League ===
==== League table ====
Pos	Team	Pld	W	D	L	GF	GA	GD	Pts	Qualification
1	Sydney FC	10	8	0	2	29	9	+20	24	Qualification to Finals series
2	Brisbane Roar (C)	10	6	3	1	17	7	+10	21	Qualification to Finals series
3	Canberra United	10	5	2	3	16	9	+7	17	Qualification to Finals series
4	Melbourne Victory	10	4	3	3	12	11	+1	15	Qualification to Finals series
5	Perth Glory	10	4	1	5	11	15	−4	13	
6	Newcastle Jets	10	3	1	6	13	15	−2	10	
7	Adelaide United	10	0	0	10	4	36	−32	0	

Source: au.soccerway.com
Rules for classification: 1) points; 2) goal difference; 3) number of goals scored.
(C) Champions

==== Results summary ====
Overall								Home						Away					
Pld	W	D	L	GF	GA	GD	Pts	W	D	L	GF	GA	GD	W	D	L	GF	GA	GD
10	3	1	6	13	15	−2	10	1	0	4	8	9	−1	2	1	2	5	6	−1

Source: worldfootball.net

==== Results by round ====
Round	1	2	3	4	5	6	7	8	9	10	11	12
Ground	A	B	H	A	A	H	B	H	H	A	A	H
Result	W	B	L	W	L	L	B	L	W	L	D	L
Position	3	3	5	3	5	5	5	6	5	6	6	6
Points	3	3	3	6	6	6	6	6	9	9	10	10

Source: worldfootball.net
A = Away; H = Home; W = Win; D = Draw; L = Loss

==== Matches ====
The league fixtures were announced on 20 August 2010.

Win Draw Loss

6 November 2010 1	Adelaide United	0–2	Newcastle Jets	Adelaide
14:30 ACDT		Report	McDonnell 83', 88'	Stadium: Hindmarsh Stadium; Referee: Stacey Sasopoulos

20 November 2010 3	Newcastle Jets	0–4	Brisbane Roar	Newcastle
15:00 AEDT		Report	Harch 2', 60'; Butt 25'; De Vanna 72' (pen.)	Stadium: Wanderers Oval; Referee: Kirralee Gardiner

27 November 2010 4	Sydney FC	1–2	Newcastle Jets	Sydney
15:00 AEDT	Khamis 31'	Report	Andrews 84', 90'	Stadium: Campbelltown Stadium; Referee: Kiralee Gardiner

5 December 2010 5	Perth Glory	1–0	Newcastle Jets	Perth
17:00 AWST	Gibbons 4'	Report		Stadium: 6PR Stadium; Referee: Stacey Sasopolous

11 December 2010 6	Newcastle Jets	0–1	Canberra United	Newcastle
15:00 AEDT		Report	Heyman 36'	Stadium: EnergyAustralia Stadium; Attendance: 349; Referee: Peta McCallum

2 January 2011 8	Newcastle Jets	0–1	Melbourne Victory	Newcastle
15:00 AEDT		Report	Jackson 47'	Stadium: Wanderers Oval; Referee: Kirralee Gardiner

8 January 2011 9	Newcastle Jets	7–1	Adelaide United	Newcastle
15:00 AEDT	Feuerriegel 23', 51'; Andrews 46', 52', 57', 85', 90+2'	Report	Quigley 34'	Stadium: Wanderers Oval; Referee: Kirralee Andruschak

15 January 2011 10	Canberra United	4–1	Newcastle Jets	Canberra
17:00 AEDT	Munoz 3', 78'; Heyman 19'; van Egmond 88'	Report	Andrews 47'	Stadium: Deakin Stadium; Attendance: 769; Referee: Peta McCallum

22 January 2011 11	Brisbane Roar	0–0	Newcastle Jets	Brisbane
14:00 AEST		Report		Stadium: Ballymore Stadium; Referee: Catherine Hofmann

29 January 2011 12	Newcastle Jets	1–2	Sydney FC	Newcastle
15:00 AEDT	Crawford 62'	Report	Simon 56'; Uzunlar 72' (pen.)	Stadium: Wanderers Oval; Referee: Peta McCallum

== Statistics ==
=== Appearances and goals ===
Includes all competitions. Players with no appearances not included in the list.

No.	Pos.	Nat.	Name	W-League		Total	
No.	Pos.	Nat.	Name	Apps	Goals	Apps	Goals
1	GK	(Australia)	Alison Logue	1	0	1	0
3	DF	(United States)	Nicole Cross	9	0	9	0
4	DF	(Australia)	Thea Slatyer	7+1	0	8	0
5	MF	(Australia)	Gema Simon	10	0	10	0
6	MF	(Australia)	Amber Neilson	8+2	0	10	0
7	FW	(Australia)	Tara Andrews	9+1	7	10	7
9	FW	(Australia)	Kate Hensman	6+3	0	9	0
10	MF	(Australia)	Hayley Crawford	10	1	10	1
11	FW	(Australia)	Sasha McDonnell	5	2	5	2
12	MF	(Australia)	Melissa Feuregill	7+2	2	9	2
13	DF	(Australia)	Carlie Ikonomou	4+3	0	7	0
14	DF	(Australia)	Hannah Brewer	10	0	10	0
15	MF	(Australia)	Madeline Searl	1+3	0	4	0
17	DF	(Australia)	Alexandra Huynh	3+5	0	8	0
18	FW	(Australia)	Leia Smith	3+4	0	7	0
19	FW	(Australia)	Rhali Dobson	0+1	0	1	0
20	MF	(Australia)	Kara Mowbray	3+1	0	4	0
21	MF	(Australia)	Renee Cartwright	5+2	0	7	0
22	GK	(United States)	Alli Lipsher	9	0	9	0
—	—	(Australia)	Bridgette Holt	0+1	0	1	0

=== Disciplinary record ===
Includes all competitions. The list is sorted by squad number when total cards are equal. Players with no cards not included in the list.

Rank	No.	Pos.	Nat.	Name	W-League			Total		
Rank	No.	Pos.	Nat.	Name	Booked	(yellow card) (yellow-red card)	Sent off (straight red)	Booked	(yellow card) (yellow-red card)	Sent off (straight red)
1	3	DF	(United States)	Nicole Cross	3	0	0	3	0	0
2	17	DF	(United States)	Alexandra Huynh	2	0	0	2	0	0
3	4	DF	(Australia)	Thea Slatyer	1	0	0	1	0	0
3	6	MF	(Australia)	Amber Neilson	1	0	0	1	0	0
3	10	MF	(Australia)	Hayley Crawford	1	0	0	1	0	0
3	11	FW	(Australia)	Sasha McDonnell	1	0	0	1	0	0
3	13	DF	(Australia)	Carlie Ikonomou	1	0	0	1	0	0
3	14	DF	(Australia)	Hannah Brewer	1	0	0	1	0	0
3	18	FW	(Australia)	Leia Smith	1	0	0	1	0	0
3	21	MF	(Australia)	Renee Cartwright	1	0	0	1	0	0
Total					13	0	0	13	0	0

=== Clean sheets ===
Includes all competitions. The list is sorted by squad number when total clean sheets are equal. Numbers in parentheses represent games where both goalkeepers participated and both kept a clean sheet; the number in parentheses is awarded to the goalkeeper who was substituted on, whilst a full clean sheet is awarded to the goalkeeper who was on the field at the start of play. Goalkeepers with no clean sheets not included in the list.

Rank	No.	Nat.	Goalkeeper	W-League	Total
1	22	(United States)	Alli Lipsher	2	2
