= 2008–09 Newcastle Jets FC (women) season =

Newcastle Jets (W-League)
2008–09 season
- Chairman: Con Constantine
- Head Coach: Gary Phillips
- Stadium: Wanderers Oval
- W-League: 2nd
- W-League Finals: Semi-finals
- Top goalscorer: Kate Gill (6)
- Highest home attendance: 2,889 vs. Canberra United (10 January 2009); W-League Finals
- Lowest home attendance: 300 vs. Sydney FC (20 Decmebe 2008); W-League
- Biggest win: 4–1 vs. Perth Glory (H) (23 November 2008); W-League
- Biggest defeat: 0–2 vs. Queensland Roar (H) (8 November 2008); W-League
Home colours

The 2008–09 season was Newcastle Jets Football Club (W-League)'s first season, in the newly formed women's league in Australia the W-League. Newcastle Jets finished 2nd in their W-League season, finishing in the semi-finals.

== Players ==
Note: Flags indicate national team as defined under FIFA eligibility rules; some limited exceptions apply. Players may hold more than one non-FIFA nationality.

No.	Pos.	Nation	Player
1	GK	AUS	Alison Logue
2	DF	AUS	Hannah Brewer
3	MF	AUS	Samantha Wood
4	DF	AUS	Libby Sharpe
5	MF	AUS	Cheryl Salisbury
6	FW	AUS	Amber Neilson
7	MF	AUS	Gema Simon
8	FW	AUS	Leia Smith
9	FW	AUS	Rhali Dobson
10	MF	AUS	Joanne Peters
11	DF	ENG	Stacy Day

No.	Pos.	Nation	Player
12	FW	AUS	Kate Gill
13	DF	AUS	Gemma O'Toole
14	MF	AUS	Nicole Jones
15	MF	AUS	Emily van Egmond
16	DF	AUS	Kirstyn Pearce
17	MF	AUS	Harmonie Attwill
18	DF	NZL	Rebecca Smith
19	MF	SWE	Sanna Frostevall
20	GK	AUS	Brianna Davey
21	MF	AUS	Taleah Doyle
22	DF	AUS	Courtney Miller

== Competitions ==
=== Overall record ===
Competition	First match	Last match	Starting round	Final position	Record							
Competition	First match	Last match	Starting round	Final position	Pld	W	D	L	GF	GA	GD	Win %
W-League	26 October 2008	28 December 2008	Matchday 1	2nd	10	5	2	3	17	12	+5	50.00
W-League Finals	10 January 2009		Semi-finals	Semi-finals	1	0	0	1	0	1	−1	0.00
Total					11	5	2	4	17	13	+4	45.45

Source: Competitions

=== W-League ===
==== League table ====
Pos	Team	Pld	W	D	L	GF	GA	GD	Pts	Qualification
1	Queensland Roar (C)	10	8	1	1	27	7	+20	25	Qualification to Finals series
2	Newcastle Jets	10	5	2	3	17	12	+5	17	Qualification to Finals series
3	Canberra United	10	4	4	2	14	10	+4	16	Qualification to Finals series
4	Sydney FC	10	4	2	4	15	14	+1	14	Qualification to Finals series
5	Melbourne Victory	10	4	0	6	13	13	0	12	
6	Central Coast Mariners	10	4	0	6	15	20	−5	12	
7	Perth Glory	10	3	2	5	14	24	−10	11	
8	Adelaide United	10	2	1	7	13	28	−15	7	

Rules for classification: 1) points; 2) goal difference; 3) number of goals scored.
(C) Champions

==== Results summary ====
Overall								Home						Away					
Pld	W	D	L	GF	GA	GD	Pts	W	D	L	GF	GA	GD	W	D	L	GF	GA	GD
10	5	2	3	17	12	+5	17	4	0	1	10	5	+5	1	2	2	7	7	0

Source: worldfootball.net

==== Results by round ====
Round	1	2	3	4	5	6	7	8	9	10
Ground	H	A	H	A	H	A	A	H	H	A
Result	W	L	L	D	W	W	L	W	W	D
Position	4	4	7	7	3	2	4	2	2	2
Points	3	3	3	4	7	10	10	13	16	17

Source: worldfootball.net
A = Away; H = Home; W = Win; D = Draw; L = Loss

==== Matches ====
The league fixtures were announced on 1 October 2008.

Win Draw Loss

26 October 2008 1	Newcastle Jets	2–1	Canberra United	Newcastle
13:30 AEDT	Gil 24', 82'	Report	McDonnell 2'	Stadium: Wanderers Oval; Attendance: 1,110; Referee: Jacqui Melksham

31 October 2008 2	Adelaide United	3–2	Newcastle Jets	Adelaide
16:45 ACDT	Scalzi 11', 46', 50'	Report	Day 38'; Salisbury 89'	Stadium: Hindmarsh Stadium; Referee: Sara Hodson

8 November 2008 3	Newcastle Jets	0–2	Queensland Roar	Lismore
19:00 AEDT		Report	Beutel 14'; Colthorpe 84'	Stadium: Oakes Oval; Attendance: 1,140; Referee: Casey Reibelt

15 November 2008 4	Sydney FC	1–1	Newcastle Jets	Sydney
16:00 AEDT	Khamis 48'	Report	Gill 68'	Stadium: Campbelltown Stadium; Referee: Lee Corey

23 November 2008 5	Newcastle Jets	4–1	Perth Glory	Newcastle
15:00 AEDT	Pearce 17'; Gill 24'; Jones 27'; Neilson 76'	Report	Tabain 6'	Stadium: Wanderers Oval; Referee: Kate Jacewicz

29 November 2008 6	Central Coast Mariners	2–4	Newcastle Jets	Sydney
18:00 AEDT	Rollason 65'; Simon 90+1'	Report	Jones 34'; van Egmond 44', 46'; Peters 77'	Stadium: Campbelltown Stadium; Attendance: 211; Referee: Kirralee Gardener

6 December 2008 7	Melbourne Victory	1–0	Newcastle Jets	Melbourne
19:00 AEDT	Timko 82'	Report		Stadium: Epping Stadium; Referee: Sara Hodson

14 December 2008 8	Newcastle Jets	2–1	Adelaide United	Newcastle
17:00 AEDT	Frostevall 35'; Neilson 81'	Report	Balomenos 19'	Stadium: Wanderers Oval; Referee: Lee Corey

20 December 2008 9	Newcastle Jets	2–0	Sydney FC	Sydney
16:00 AEDT	Gill 21', 28'	Report		Stadium: Campbelltown Stadium; Attendance: 300; Referee: Jacqui Melksham

28 December 2008 10	Perth Glory	0–0	Newcastle Jets	Perth
15:00 AWST		Report		Stadium: Members Equity Stadium; Attendance: 693; Referee: Lee Corey

==== Finals series ====
10 January 2009 Semi-finals	Newcastle Jets	0–1	Canberra United	Newcastle
16:00 AEDT		Report	Mowbray 25'	Stadium: EnergyAustralia Stadium; Attendance: 2,889; Referee: Sara Hodson

== Leading scorers ==
The leading goal scores from the regular season.

Total	Pos	Player		Goals per Round									
Total	Pos	Player		1	2	3	4	5	6	7	8	9	10
6	ST	(Australia)	Katie Gill	2			1	1					2
2	MF	(Australia)	Nicole Jones					1	1				
2	MF	(Australia)	Amber Neilson					1			1		
2	MF	(Australia)	Emily van Egmond						2				
1	MF	(Australia)	Stacy Day		1								
1	MF	(Australia)	Cheryl Salisbury		1								
1	MF	(Australia)	Kirstyn Pearce					1					
1	MF	(Australia)	Joanne Peters						1				
1	MF	(Australia)	Rebecca Smith								1		

== Milestones ==
First game = 2–1 win home V Canberra United
Largest win = 4–1 win home V Perth Glory
Largest loss = 3–2 loss away V Adelaide United
