= 2012–13 Newcastle Jets FC (women) season =

Newcastle Jets (W-League)
2012–13 season
- Chairman: Ray Baartz
- Head Coach: Wayne O'Sullivan
- Stadium: Wanderers Oval
- W-League: 7th
- W-League Finals: DNQ
- Top goalscorer: Tori Huster; Gary van Egmond (4 each)
- Biggest win: 4–0 vs. Adelaide United (H) (17 November 2012); W-League
- Biggest defeat: 0–5 vs. Canberra United (H) (17 November 2012); W-League; 1–6 vs. Perth Glory (H) (10 November 2012); W-League
Home colours	Away colours

The 2012–13 season was Newcastle Jets Football Club's fifth season, in the W-League. Newcastle Jets finished 5th in their W-League season.

== Players ==
Note: Flags indicate national team as defined under FIFA eligibility rules; some limited exceptions apply. Players may hold more than one non-FIFA nationality.

No.	Pos.	Nation	Player
1	GK	AUS	Eliza Campbell
2	DF	AUS	Hannah Brewer
3	MF	AUS	Hayley Crawford
4	DF	AUS	Gemma Pearce
5	MF	USA	Tori Huster
6	MF	USA	Angela Salem
7	DF	AUS	Gema Simon
8	MF	AUS	Madeleine Searl
9	FW	AUS	Tara Andrews
10	MF	AUS	Emily van Egmond
11	FW	AUS	Kate Hensman

No.	Pos.	Nation	Player
12	MF	USA	Tiffany Boshers
13	MF	AUS	Bronte Bates
14	MF	AUS	Sammara Schmitzer
15	FW	AUS	Alisha Foote
16	DF	AUS	Stacey Day
17	FW	ENG	Mikaela Howell
18	MF	AUS	Michaela Hatzirodos
19	FW	AUS	Jasmine Courtenay
20	GK	AUS	Alannah Rosewood
21	MF	AUS	Grace Macintyre

== Transfers and contracts ==
=== Transfers in ===
No.	Position	Name	From	Type/fee	Date	Ref.
5	MF	(United States) Tori Huster	(United States) Western New York Flash	Free transfer	25 September 2012	
6	MF	(United States) Angela Salem	(United States) Western New York Flash	Free transfer	25 September 2012	
12	MF	(United States) Tiffany Boshers	Free agent	Free transfer	25 September 2012	
1	GK	Eliza Campbell	Free agent	Free transfer	2 October 2012	
8	MF	Madeline Searl	(Australia) Lake Macquarie City	Free transfer	2 October 2012	
11	FW	Kate Hensman	Free agent	Free transfer	2 October 2012	
14	MF	Sammara Schmitzer	Free agent	Free transfer	2 October 2012	
15	FW	Alisha Foote	Free agent	Free transfer	2 October 2012	
17	FW	(England) Mikaela Howell	(United States) D.C. United	Free transfer	2 October 2012	
18	MF	Michaela Hatzirodos	Brisbane Roar	Free transfer	2 October 2012	
20	GK	Alannah Rosewood	Free agent	Free transfer	2 October 2012	
—	—	Kimberley Witt	Free agent	Free transfer	2 October 2012	

=== Transfers out ===
No.	Position	Name	To	Type/fee	Date	Ref.
3	DF	Alanna Kennedy	Sydney FC	Free transfer	6 July 2012	
17	DF	(Germany) Ariane Hingst	Canberra United	Free transfer	29 August 2012	
15	FW	Rhali Dobson	Free agent	Free transfer	2 October 2012	
5	DF	Alexandra Huynh	Western Sydney Wanderers	Free transfer	4 October 2012	
6	MF	Linda O'Neill	Western Sydney Wanderers	Free transfer	4 October 2012	
8	MF	Nicola Bolger	Sydney FC	Free transfer	10 October 2012	
1	GK	Alison Logue	Free agent	Free transfer	19 October 2012	
12	FW	Monnique Kofoed	Free agent	Free transfer	19 October 2012	
16	DF	Cassandra Koppen	Free agent	Free transfer	19 October 2012	
20	FW	Nicole Jones	Free agent	Free transfer	19 October 2012	
—	GK	Melissa Barbieri	Free agent	Free transfer	19 October 2012	

== Competitions ==
=== Overall record ===
Competition	First match	Last match	Starting round	Final position	Record							
Competition	First match	Last match	Starting round	Final position	Pld	W	D	L	GF	GA	GD	Win %
W-League	21 October 2012	13 January 2013	Matchday 1	7th	12	1	3	8	15	33	−18	8.33
Total					12	1	3	8	15	33	−18	8.33

Source: Competitions

=== W-League ===
==== League table ====
Pos	Team	Pld	W	D	L	GF	GA	GD	Pts	Qualification
1	Brisbane Roar	12	8	2	2	28	15	+13	26	Qualification to Finals series
2	Perth Glory	12	7	3	2	34	20	+14	24	Qualification to Finals series
3	Melbourne Victory	12	7	2	3	26	14	+12	23	Qualification to Finals series
4	Sydney FC (C)	12	6	2	4	30	24	+6	20	Qualification to Finals series
5	Canberra United	12	5	3	4	25	20	+5	18	
6	Western Sydney Wanderers	12	4	1	7	19	23	−4	13	
7	Newcastle Jets	12	1	3	8	15	33	−18	6	
8	Adelaide United	12	2	0	10	12	40	−28	6	

Source: au.soccerway.com
Rules for classification: 1) points; 2) goal difference; 3) number of goals scored.
(C) Champions

==== Results summary ====
Overall								Home						Away					
Pld	W	D	L	GF	GA	GD	Pts	W	D	L	GF	GA	GD	W	D	L	GF	GA	GD
12	1	3	8	19	33	−14	6	1	1	4	10	21	−11	0	2	4	9	12	−3

Source: worldfootball.net

==== Results by round ====
Round	1	2	3	4	5	6	7	8	9	10	11	12
Ground	A	H	A	H	H	A	H	A	A	H	A	H
Result	D	L	L	L	W	L	L	L	L	L	D	D
Position	3	6	8	8	7	7	7	7	8	8	8	7
Points	1	1	1	1	4	4	4	4	4	4	5	6

Source: worldfootball.net
A = Away; H = Home; W = Win; D = Draw; L = Loss

==== Matches ====
The league fixtures were announced on 18 September 2012.

Win Draw Loss

21 October 2012 1	Sydney FC	3–3	Newcastle Jets	Sydney
15:00 AEDT	Kennedy 35'; Kerr 75', 77'	Report	van Egmond 17'; Andrews 21'; Huster 58'	Stadium: Leichhardt Oval; Referee: Casey Reibelt

27 October 2012 2	Newcastle Jets	0–5	Canberra United	Newcastle
14:00 AEDT		Report	Raso 74'; Heyman 84'; Hingst 86'; Munoz 87'; Sykes 90+5'	Stadium: Wanderers Oval; Attendance: 1,000; Referee: Kirralee Gardener

3 November 2012 3	Melbourne Victory	1–0	Newcastle Jets	Geelong
14:00 AEDT	Stott 45+2'	Report		Stadium: Simonds Stadium; Referee: Katie Patterson

10 November 2012 4	Newcastle Jets	1–6	Perth Glory	Newcastle
16:30 AEDT	Huster 72'	Report	De Vanna 5'; McCallum 21'; Gill 58', 62', 90+3'; Tabain 68'	Stadium: Wanderers Oval; Referee: Peta McCallum

17 November 2012 5	Newcastle Jets	4–0	Adelaide United	Newcastle
16:30 AEDT	Andrews 8'; Salem 39' (pen.); Hensman 51'; Huster 66'	Report		Stadium: Wanderers Oval

25 November 2012 6	Western Sydney Wanderers	3–0	Newcastle Jets	Sydney
14:00 AEDT	Walsh 23', 54'; Sciberras 90+3'	Report		Stadium: Campbelltown Stadium; Referee: Kate Jacewicz

2 December 2012 7	Newcastle Jets	2–3	Brisbane Roar	Newcastle
14:00 AEDT	Huster 16'; Simon 69'	Report	Chapman 54'; Gielnik 62' (pen.); Polkinghorne 80'	Stadium: Wanderers Oval; Referee: Katie Patterson

8 December 2012 8	Canberra United	1–0	Newcastle Jets	Canberra
16:00 AEDT	Sykes 34'	Report		Stadium: Deakin Stadium; Attendance: 794; Referee: Rebecca Durcau

15 December 2012 9	Adelaide United	2–0	Newcastle Jets	Adelaide
16:00 ACDT	Moore 67'; Wallace 70'	Report		Stadium: Burton Park; Referee: Katie Patterson

23 December 2012 10	Newcastle Jets	0–4	Sydney FC	Newcastle
16:30 AEDT		Report	Simon 11', 47', 88'; Kennedy 14'	Stadium: Wanderers Oval; Referee: Kelly Jones

5 January 2013 11	Perth Glory	2–2	Newcastle Jets	Perth
16:00 AEDT	Sutton 22'; Gill 56'	Report	van Egmond 3'; Courtenay 77'	Stadium: Intiga Stadium; Attendance: 736; Referee: Catherine Hoffman

13 January 2013 12	Newcastle Jets	3–3	Melbourne Victory	Newcastle
16:00 AEDT	Courtenay 40'; van Egmond 42', 84' (pen.)	Report	Jackson 4'; Barilla 33', 62'	Stadium: Wanderers Oval; Referee: Lara Lee

== Statistics ==
=== Appearances and goals ===
Includes all competitions. Players with no appearances not included in the list.

No.	Pos.	Nat.	Name	W-League		Total	
No.	Pos.	Nat.	Name	Apps	Goals	Apps	Goals
1	GK	(Australia)	Eliza Campbell	12	0	12	0
2	DF	(Australia)	Hannah Brewer	12	0	12	0
3	MF	(Australia)	Hayley Crawford	11	0	11	0
4	DF	(Australia)	Gemma Pearce	10	0	10	0
5	MF	(United States)	Tori Huster	12	4	12	4
6	MF	(United States)	Angela Salem	7	1	7	1
7	DF	(Australia)	Gema Simon	12	1	12	1
8	MF	(Australia)	Madeleine Searl	4+2	0	6	0
9	FW	(Australia)	Tara Andrews	8+3	2	11	2
10	MF	(Australia)	Emily van Egmond	8	4	8	4
11	FW	(Australia)	Kate Hensman	1+5	1	6	1
12	MF	(United States)	Tiffany Boshers	6+4	0	10	0
13	MF	(Australia)	Bronte Bates	1+4	0	5	0
14	MF	(Australia)	Sammara Schmitzer	2+2	0	4	0
15	FW	(Australia)	Alisha Foote	7+5	0	12	0
16	DF	(Australia)	Stacey Day	10+1	0	11	0
17	FW	(England)	Mikaela Howell	1+2	0	3	0
18	MF	(Australia)	Michaela Hatzirodos	4+4	0	8	0
19	FW	(Australia)	Jasmine Courtenay	3+1	2	4	2
21	MF	(Australia)	Grace Macintyre	1+1	0	2	0

=== Disciplinary record ===
Includes all competitions. The list is sorted by squad number when total cards are equal. Players with no cards not included in the list.

Rank	No.	Pos.	Nat.	Name	W-League			Total		
Rank	No.	Pos.	Nat.	Name	Booked	(yellow card) (yellow-red card)	Sent off (straight red)	Booked	(yellow card) (yellow-red card)	Sent off (straight red)
1	16	DF	(Australia)	Stacey Day	3	1	0	3	1	0
1	10	MF	(Australia)	Emily van Egmond	1	1	0	1	1	0
3	3	MF	(Australia)	Hayley Crawford	2	0	0	2	0	0
4	1	GK	(Australia)	Eliza Campbell	1	0	0	1	0	0
4	4	DF	(Australia)	Gemma Pearce	1	0	0	1	0	0
4	5	MF	(United States)	Tori Huster	1	0	0	1	0	0
4	8	MF	(Australia)	Madeleine Searl	1	0	0	1	0	0
4	9	FW	(Australia)	Tara Andrews	1	0	0	1	0	0
4	12	MF	(United States)	Tiffany Boshers	1	0	0	1	0	0
Total					12	2	0	12	2	0

=== Clean sheets ===
Includes all competitions. The list is sorted by squad number when total clean sheets are equal. Numbers in parentheses represent games where both goalkeepers participated and both kept a clean sheet; the number in parentheses is awarded to the goalkeeper who was substituted on, whilst a full clean sheet is awarded to the goalkeeper who was on the field at the start of play. Goalkeepers with no clean sheets not included in the list.

Rank	No.	Nat.	Goalkeeper	W-League	Total
1	1	(Australia)	Eliza Campbell	1	1
