= 2009 Newcastle Jets FC (women) season =

Newcastle Jets (W-League)
2009 season
- Chairman: Con Constantine
- Head Coach: Gary Phillips
- W-League: 8th
- W-League Finals: DNQ
- Top goalscorer: Tara Andrews; Renee Cartwright (2 each)
- Biggest defeat: 0–6 vs. Brisbane Roar (H) (5 December 2009); W-League

The 2009 season was Newcastle Jets Football Club (W-League)'s second season, in the W-League. Newcastle Jets finished 8th in their W-League season.

== Transfers ==
=== Transfers in ===
- Loren Mahoney (Sydney FC)
- Bronte Bates
- Kate Hensman
- Hayley Crawford
- Carlie Ikonomou
- Emma Stewart (Central Coast Mariners)
- Caitlyn Jarvie
- Madeline Searl
- Tara Andrews
- Emma-Kate Dewhurst (Central Coast Mariners)

=== Transfers out ===
- Samantha Wood
- Cheryl Salisbury
- Rhali Dobson
- Joanne Peters
- Kate Gill
- Gemma O'Toole
- Emily van Egmond (Canberra United)
- Harmonie Attwill
- Rebecca Smith
- Sanna Frostevall
- Brianna Davey
- Taleah Doyle
- Courtney Miller

== Competitions ==
=== Overall record ===
Competition	First match	Last match	Starting round	Final position	Record							
Competition	First match	Last match	Starting round	Final position	Pld	W	D	L	GF	GA	GD	Win %
W-League	5 October 2009	5 December 2009	Matchday 1	8th	10	0	2	8	7	25	−18	0.00
Total					10	0	2	8	7	25	−18	0.00

Source: Competitions

=== W-League ===
==== League table ====
Pos	Team	Pld	W	D	L	GF	GA	GD	Pts	Qualification
1	Sydney FC (C)	10	7	2	1	25	10	+15	23	Qualification to Finals series
2	Central Coast Mariners	10	7	1	2	24	7	+17	22	Qualification to Finals series
3	Brisbane Roar	10	6	3	1	24	7	+17	21	Qualification to Finals series
4	Canberra United	10	4	2	4	17	12	+5	14	Qualification to Finals series
5	Melbourne Victory	10	4	2	4	9	10	−1	14	
6	Perth Glory	10	4	1	5	11	22	−11	13	
7	Adelaide United	10	0	3	7	7	31	−24	3	
8	Newcastle Jets	10	0	2	8	7	25	−18	2	

Source: au.soccerway.com
Rules for classification: 1) points; 2) goal difference; 3) number of goals scored.
(C) Champions

==== Results summary ====
Overall								Home						Away					
Pld	W	D	L	GF	GA	GD	Pts	W	D	L	GF	GA	GD	W	D	L	GF	GA	GD
10	0	2	8	7	25	−18	2	0	1	4	5	18	−13	0	1	4	2	7	−5

Source: worldfootball.net

==== Results by round ====
Round	1	2	3	4	5	6	7	8	9	10
Ground	A	A	H	H	A	H	A	H	A	H
Result	D	L	L	L	L	D	L	L	L	L
Position	4	6	6	8	7	7	7	8	8	8
Points	1	1	1	1	1	2	2	2	2	2

Source: worldfootball.net
A = Away; H = Home; W = Win; D = Draw; L = Loss

==== Matches ====
The league fixtures were announced on 27 July 2009.

Win Draw Loss

5 October 2009 1	Adelaide United	0–0	Newcastle Jets	Adelaide
14:45 ACDT		Report		Stadium: Hindmarsh Stadium; Referee: Lee Corey

10 October 2009 2	Perth Glory	1–0	Newcastle Jets	Perth
12:00 AWST	McCallum 10'	Report		Stadium: ME Bank Stadium; Referee: Lee Corey

17 October 2009 3	Newcastle Jets	0–1	Sydney FC	Newcastle
15:00 AEDT		Report	Khamis 5'	Stadium: EnergyAustralia Stadium; Attendance: 470; Referee: Kirralee Gardener

24 October 2009 4	Newcastle Jets	1–5	Central Coast Mariners	Newcastle
16:00 AEDT	Andrews 88'	Report	Vandenbergh 5'; Heyman 21', 26'; Fletcher 63' (pen.); Camilleri 82'	Stadium: Wanderers Oval; Attendance: 750; Referee: Kirralee Gardner

31 October 2009 5	Melbourne Victory	2–1	Newcastle Jets	Melbourne
14:00 AEDT	Gorry 45'; Niceski 90+'	Report	Cartwright 62'	Stadium: Veneto Club; Referee: Rebecca Durcau
Note: Match originally located for Bob Jane Stadium, but relocated due to poor surface conditions. It was relocated to Veneto Club.

7 November 2009 6	Newcastle Jets	3–3	Adelaide United	Newcastle
16:00 AEDT	Smith 19'; Crawford 60'; Cartwright 79'	Report	Boaler 25'; Quigley 45', 57' (pen.)	Stadium: Wanderers Oval; Referee: Kate Jacewicz

14 November 2009 7	Sydney FC	1–0	Newcastle Jets	Sydney
16:00 AEDT	Khamis 24'	Report		Stadium: Seymour Shaw Park; Referee: Peta McCallum

22 November 2009 8	Newcastle Jets	1–3	Canberra United	Newcastle
14:15 AEDT	Neilson 55' (pen.)	Report	Maciejewski 10'; Tseng 61'; Hogg 80'	Stadium: EnergyAustralia Stadium; Referee: Peta McCallum

27 November 2009 9	Central Coast Mariners	3–1	Newcastle Jets	Gosford
17:15 AEDT	Heyman 36'; Fletcher 71'; Vandenbergh 74'	Report	Andrews 44'	Stadium: Bluetongue Stadium; Referee: Peta McCallum

5 December 2009 10	Newcastle Jets	0–6	Brisbane Roar	Newcastle
16:00 AEDT		Report	Polkinghorne 2'; Butt 19', 26', 66'; Burgess 81'; Harch 90'	Stadium: Wanderers Oval; Referee: Kirralee Gardener

== Squad statistics ==
Last updated 10 October 2009

No.	Pos.	Name	W-League		W-League Finals		Total		Discipline	
No.	Pos.	Name	Apps	Goals	Apps	Goals	Apps	Goals	Yellow card	Red card
1	GK	(Australia) Alison Logue	2	0	0	0	2	0	0	0
2	DF	(Australia) Libby Sharpe	0	0	0	0	0	0	0	0
3	??	(Australia) Pelay Ingles	2	0	0	0	2	0	0	0
4	FW	(Australia) Loren Mahoney	2	0	0	0	2	0	0	0
5	DF	(England) Stacy Day	2	0	0	0	2	0	0	0
6	MF	(Australia) Amber Neilson	2	0	0	0	2	0	0	0
7	MF	(Australia) Gema Simon	2	0	0	0	2	0	0	0
8	??	(Australia) Bronte Bates	0	0	0	0	0	0	0	0
9	??	(Australia) Kate Hensman	2	0	0	0	2	0	0	0
10	FW	(Australia) Hayley Crawford	2	0	0	0	2	0	1	0
11	??	(Australia) Carlie Ikonomou	2	0	0	0	2	0	1	0
12	FW	(Australia) Emma Stewart	1	0	0	0	1	0	0	0
13	??	(Australia) Caitlyn Jarvie	2	0	0	0	2	0	0	0
14	DF	(Australia) Hannah Brewer	0	0	0	0	0	0	0	0
15	MF	(Australia) Nicole Jones	0	0	0	0	0	0	0	0
16	DF	(Australia) Kirstyn Pearce	2	0	0	0	2	0	0	0
17	MF	(Australia) Madeline Searl	2	0	0	0	2	0	0	0
18	FW	(Australia) Leia Smith	2	0	0	0	2	0	1	0
19	??	(Australia) Tara Andrews	1	0	0	0	1	0	0	0
20	GK	(Australia) Emma-Kate Dewhurst	0	0	0	0	0	0	0	0
