= W-League transfers for 2017–18 season =

This is a list of Australian soccer transfers for the 2017–18 W-League. Only moves featuring at least one W-League club are listed.

== Transfers ==
All players without a flag are Australian. Clubs without a flag are clubs participating in the W-League.

=== Pre-season ===
Date	Name	Moving from	Moving to
4 April 2017	Teigen Allen	Melbourne City	(Norway) Vålerenga
4 April 2017	Aivi Luik	Melbourne City	(Norway) Vålerenga
8 August 2017	Nicola Bolger	Sydney FC	Perth Glory
8 August 2017	Marianna Tabain	Melbourne City	Perth Glory
11 August 2017	(United States) Maddy Evans	Brisbane Roar	(United States) Orlando Pride (end of loan followed by retirement)
23 August 2017	(United States) Jen Hoy	Newcastle Jets	(United States) Chicago Red Stars (end of loan)
23 August 2017	Grace MacIntyre	Newcastle Jets	Canberra United
23 August 2017	(United States) Megan Oyster	Newcastle Jets	(United States) Boston Breakers (Note: Megan Oyster was originally loaned to Newcastle Jets by Washington Spirit, but was traded to the Boston Breakers during the 2016–17 season.)
28 August 2017	Ellie Carpenter	Western Sydney Wanderers	Canberra United
29 August 2017	Laura Alleway	(United States) Orlando Pride	Melbourne Victory
5 September 2017	Teigen Allen	(Norway) Vålerenga	Sydney FC
5 September 2017	Caitlin Cooper	Western Sydney Wanderers	Sydney FC
5 September 2017	Angelique Hristodoulou	Western Sydney Wanderers	Sydney FC
5 September 2017	Rachael Soutar	Unattached	Sydney FC
8 September 2017	Trudy Burke	Canberra United	Western Sydney Wanderers
8 September 2017	(Israel) Lee Falkon	(Germany) MSV Duisburg	Western Sydney Wanderers
8 September 2017	Sunny Franco	Brisbane Roar	Western Sydney Wanderers
8 September 2017	(Netherlands) Marlous Pieëte	(Netherlands) Ajax	Western Sydney Wanderers
8 September 2017	Olivia Price	Sydney FC	Western Sydney Wanderers
8 September 2017	Rosie Sutton	Perth Glory	Western Sydney Wanderers
12 September 2017	(Hong Kong) Cheung Wai Ki	Unattached	Brisbane Roar
15 September 2017	(United States) Haley Kopmeyer	(United States) Seattle Reign FC	Canberra United (loan)
18 September 2017	Casey Dumont	Western Sydney Wanderers	Melbourne Victory
19 September 2017	Angela Beard	Brisbane Roar	Melbourne Victory
20 September 2017	(England) Laura Bassett	Unattached	Canberra United
20 September 2017	Kyra Cooney-Cross	Unattached	Melbourne Victory
21 September 2017	Hayley Raso	(United States) Portland Thorns FC	Brisbane Roar
22 September 2017	(Netherlands) Maruschka Waldus	(Iceland) Fylkir	Western Sydney Wanderers
22 September 2017	Emma Checker	(South Korea) Incheon Red Angels	Adelaide United
22 September 2017	Ayesha Norrie	Melbourne Victory	Brisbane Roar
22 September 2017	Melina Ayres	Melbourne City	Melbourne Victory
24 September 2017	Ellie Brush	Canberra United	Western Sydney Wanderers
24 September 2017	Rhali Dobson	Newcastle Jets	Melbourne City
24 September 2017	Hayley Richmond	Unattached	Melbourne City
24 September 2017	Sofia Sakalis	Unattached	Melbourne City
26 September 2017	Jenna McCormick	(Norway) Medkila	Adelaide United
28 September 2017	Kahlia Hogg	Canberra United	Western Sydney Wanderers
29 September 2017	Talitha Kramer	(Australia) Illawarra Stingrays	Western Sydney Wanderers
29 September 2017	Katelyn Leadbetter	(Australia) Illawarra Stingrays	Western Sydney Wanderers
29 September 2017	Susan Phonsongkham	Unattached	Western Sydney Wanderers
2 October 2017	Liana Danaskos	Newcastle Jets	Canberra United
2 October 2017	Danielle Brogan	Unattached	Perth Glory
2 October 2017	(Mexico) Arianna Romero	Perth Glory	(Norway) Vålerenga
2 October 2017	Lisa De Vanna	(Australia) South Melbourne	Sydney FC
4 October 2017	(United States) Christina Gibbons	(United States) FC Kansas City	Melbourne Victory (loan)
5 October 2017	Hannah Brewer	Canberra United	Newcastle Jets
5 October 2017	Nikola Orgill	Western Sydney Wanderers	Newcastle Jets
5 October 2017	Tash Prior	Unattached	Newcastle Jets
6 October 2017	Georgia Plessas	(Australia) Sydney University	Canberra United
6 October 2017	Amy Sayer	(Australia) Sydney University	Canberra United
6 October 2017	Kyah Simon	Unattached	Melbourne City
9 October 2017	(United States) Christine Nairn	Melbourne Victory	Unattached
10 October 2017	Tara Andrews	Unattached	Newcastle Jets
12 October 2017	(Costa Rica) Raquel Rodríguez	(United States) Sky Blue FC	Perth Glory
15 October 2017	Kylie Ledbrook	Unattached	Sydney FC
15 October 2017	Ally Green	Unattached	Sydney FC
15 October 2017	Taylor Ray	Unattached	Sydney FC
15 October 2017	(New Zealand) Emma Rolston	Unattached	Sydney FC
15 October 2017	Julia Vignes	Unattached	Sydney FC
17 October 2017	Chloe Logarzo	Newcastle Jets	Sydney FC
17 October 2017	(United States) Katie Stengel	(United States) Boston Breakers	Newcastle Jets (loan)
19 October 2017	(United States) Lo'eau LaBonta	(United States) Kansas City	Western Sydney Wanderers (loan)
19 October 2017	Tiffany Eliadis	(Australia) South Melbourne	Melbourne Victory
19 October 2017	Whitney Knight	Unattached	Melbourne Victory
19 October 2017	(United States) Rachel Hill	(United States) Orlando Pride	Perth Glory (loan)
19 October 2017	Emily van Egmond	Unattached	Newcastle Jets
21 October 2017	(United States) Celeste Boureille	(United States) Portland Thorns FC	Brisbane Roar (loan)
21 October 2017	(United States) Carson Pickett	(United States) Seattle Reign FC	Brisbane Roar (loan)
23 October 2017	(United States) Amanda Frisbie	(United States) Boston Breakers	Perth Glory (loan)
23 October 2017	(United States) Britt Eckerstrom	(United States) Portland Thorns FC	Newcastle Jets (loan)
23 October 2017	(United States) Tori Huster	(United States) Washington Spirit	Newcastle Jets (loan)
23 October 2017	(United States) Kendall Fletcher	Unattached	Canberra United (guest player)
24 October 2017	(United States) Kristen McNabb	(United States) Seattle Reign FC	Melbourne Victory (loan)
24 October 2017	(United States) Emily Sonnett	(United States) Portland Thorns FC	Sydney FC (loan)
25 October 2017	(United States) Toni Pressley	(United States) Orlando Pride	Canberra United (loan)
25 October 2017	(United States) Ashley Hatch	(United States) North Carolina Courage	Melbourne City (loan)
25 October 2017	Alanna Kennedy	(United States) Orlando Pride	Melbourne City (loan)
25 October 2017	(Japan) Yukari Kinga	Canberra United	Melbourne City
25 October 2017	Emily Kenshole	(Australia) Galaxy United	Melbourne City
25 October 2017	Lia Muldeary	Unattached	Melbourne City
25 October 2017	(South Korea) Jeon Ga-eul	(South Korea) Incheon Red Angels	Melbourne Victory
26 October 2017	Aoife Colvill	Canberra United Academy	Canberra United
26 October 2017	Bethany Gordon	(Australia) Sydney University	Canberra United
26 October 2017	Taren King	(Australia) Sydney University	Canberra United
26 October 2017	Sarah Morgan	Canberra United Academy	Canberra United
26 October 2017	Caitlin Munoz	Unattached	Canberra United
26 October 2017	Maddy Whittall	(Australia) Belconnen United	Canberra United
26 October 2017	(Norway) Elise Thorsnes	(Norway) Avaldsnes	Canberra United (loan)
26 October 2017	(United States) Jasmyne Spencer	Canberra United	(United States) Orlando Pride (end of loan)
26 October 2017	(Mexico) Sofia Huerta	Adelaide United	(United States) Chicago Red Stars (end of loan)
26 October 2017	(Brazil) Mônica	Adelaide United	(United States) Orlando Pride (end of loan)
26 October 2017	Stella Rigon	Adelaide United	Unattached
26 October 2017	Laura Johns	Unattached	Adelaide United
26 October 2017	(United States) Stephanie Ochs	Canberra United	(United States) Houston Dash (end of loan)
26 October 2017	(Denmark) Nina Frausing-Pedersen	Brisbane Roar	(Denmark) Brøndby
26 October 2017	Jacynta Galabadaarachchi	Melbourne City	Abroad
26 October 2017	(United States) Erika Tymrak	Melbourne City	(United States) FC Kansas City (end of loan)
26 October 2017	(United States) Beverly Yanez	Melbourne City	(United States) Seattle Reign FC (end of loan)
26 October 2017	(Mexico) Bianca Henninger	Melbourne Victory	(United States) Houston Dash (end of loan)
26 October 2017	(United States) Samantha Johnson	Melbourne Victory	(United States) Chicago Red Stars (end of loan)
26 October 2017	(United States) Christine Nairn	Melbourne Victory	(United States) Washington Spirit (end of loan)
26 October 2017	Alex Natoli	Melbourne Victory	Unattached
26 October 2017	Kariah White	Melbourne Victory	Unattached
26 October 2017	(New Zealand) Kirsty Yallop	Melbourne Victory	Unattached
26 October 2017	Cortnee Vine	Brisbane Roar	Newcastle Jets
26 October 2017	Morgan Aquino	Perth Glory	Unattached
26 October 2017	Carla Bennett	Perth Glory	Unattached
26 October 2017	(United States) Vanessa DiBernardo	Perth Glory	(United States) Chicago Red Stars (end of loan)
26 October 2017	Emily Henderson	Perth Glory	Unattached
26 October 2017	Angelique Stannett	Perth Glory	Unattached
26 October 2017	Claire Coelho	Sydney FC	Newcastle Jets
26 October 2017	Shannon May	Unattached	Perth Glory
26 October 2017	Hannah Bacon	Sydney FC	(Norway) Trondheims-Ørn
26 October 2017	Sarah Easthope	Sydney FC	Unattached
26 October 2017	Gabe Marzano	Sydney FC	Unattached
26 October 2017	(Nigeria) Francisca Ordega	Sydney FC	(United States) Washington Spirit (end of loan)
26 October 2017	Pana Petratos	Sydney FC	Unattached
26 October 2017	Natalie Tobin	Sydney FC	Unattached
26 October 2017	Servet Uzunlar	Sydney FC	Unattached
26 October 2017	Sheridan Rainey	(Australia) Blacktown Spartans	Sydney FC
27 October 2017	(United States) Makenzy Doniak	(United States) North Carolina Courage	Adelaide United (loan)
27 October 2017	(United States) Alyssa Mautz	Perth Glory (Note: Mautz returned from loan to her parent club Chicago Red Stars before being loaned to Adelaide United)	Adelaide United (loan)
27 October 2017	Hollie Palmer	Unattached	Brisbane Roar
27 October 2017	Lucinda Pullar	Unattached	Brisbane Roar
27 October 2017	Kirsten Veeren	(Australia) Western Pride	Brisbane Roar
27 October 2017	Jennifer Bisset	Unattached	Western Sydney Wanderers
27 October 2017	Alexandra Huynh	(Australia) Blacktown Spartans	Western Sydney Wanderers
27 October 2017	Nicole Simonsen	Unattached	Western Sydney Wanderers
3 November 2017	Chelsie Dawber	Unattached	Adelaide United
3 November 2017	Nora Peat	Unattached	Adelaide United
3 November 2017	Katelyn Tucker	Unattached	Adelaide United

=== Mid-season ===
Date	Name	Moving from	Moving to
2 November 2017	Melissa Barbieri	Unattached	Melbourne City
22 November 2017	(England) Jodie Taylor	(England) Arsenal	Melbourne City
28 November 2017	(United States) Aubrey Bledsoe	(United States) Orlando Pride	Sydney FC (loan)
1 December 2017	Aivi Luik	(Norway) Vålerenga	Melbourne City
15 December 2017	Caitlin Foord	(Japan) Vegalta Sendai	Sydney FC
16 February 2018	Ashleigh Sykes	Canberra United	Retired

== Re-signings ==
Date	Name	Club
8 August 2017	Samantha Kerr	Perth Glory
21 August 2017	Alex Chidiac	Adelaide United
22 August 2017	Michelle Heyman	Canberra United
30 August 2017	Eliza Campbell	Adelaide United
1 September 2017	Adriana Jones	Adelaide United
1 September 2017	Nickoletta Flannery	Canberra United
1 September 2017	Grace Maher	Canberra United
4 September 2017	Grace Abbey	Adelaide United
5 September 2017	Amy Harrison	Sydney FC
5 September 2017	Princess Ibini	Sydney FC
5 September 2017	Leena Khamis	Sydney FC
5 September 2017	Sham Khamis	Sydney FC
5 September 2017	Teresa Polias	Sydney FC
5 September 2017	Elizabeth Ralston	Sydney FC
5 September 2017	Remy Siemsen	Sydney FC
5 September 2017	Georgia Yeoman-Dale	Sydney FC
8 September 2017	Mackenzie Arnold	Brisbane Roar
8 September 2017	Clare Polkinghorne	Brisbane Roar
8 September 2017	Jada Mathyssen-Whyman	Western Sydney Wanderers
11 September 2017	Amy Jackson	Melbourne City
11 September 2017	Tyla-Jay Vlajnic	Melbourne City
13 September 2017	Erica Halloway	Western Sydney Wanderers
13 September 2017	Alix Roberts	Western Sydney Wanderers
18 September 2017	Bethany Mason-Jones	Melbourne Victory
20 September 2017	MelindaJ Barbieri	Melbourne Victory
21 September 2017	(Turkey) Gülcan Koca	Melbourne Victory
22 September 2017	Amy Chapman	Brisbane Roar
22 September 2017	Abbey Lloyd	Brisbane Roar
22 September 2017	Summer O'Brien	Brisbane Roar
22 September 2017	Natalie Tathem	Brisbane Roar
22 September 2017	Allira Toby	Brisbane Roar
22 September 2017	Kaitlyn Torpey	Brisbane Roar
22 September 2017	Georgina Worth	Brisbane Roar
23 September 2017	Annabelle Martin	Melbourne Victory
25 September 2017	Chloe O'Brien	Western Sydney Wanderers
25 September 2017	Rachel Lowe	Western Sydney Wanderers
26 September 2017	Sarah Carroll	Perth Glory
29 September 2017	Alexandra Gummer	Melbourne Victory
29 September 2017	Laura Spiranovic	Melbourne Victory
29 September 2017	Georgia Campagnale	Adelaide United
29 September 2017	Emily Condon	Adelaide United
29 September 2017	Emily Hodgson	Adelaide United
2 October 2017	(England) Natasha Dowie	Melbourne Victory
6 October 2017	Georgia Boric	Canberra United
6 October 2017	Clare Hunt	Canberra United
6 October 2017	Karly Roestbakken	Canberra United
10 October 2017	Cassidy Davis	Newcastle Jets
10 October 2017	Jenna Kingsley	Newcastle Jets
12 October 2017	(United States) Nikki Stanton	Perth Glory
13 October 2017	Ashleigh Sykes	Canberra United
17 October 2017	(Wales) Jess Fishlock	Melbourne City
19 October 2017	Lia Privitelli	Melbourne Victory
19 October 2017	(United States) Lauren Barnes	Melbourne City
19 October 2017	Larissa Crummer	Melbourne City
19 October 2017	(New Zealand) Rebekah Stott	Melbourne City
19 October 2017	Lydia Williams	Melbourne City
20 October 2017	Katrina Gorry	Brisbane Roar
21 October 2017	Steph Catley	Melbourne City
23 October 2017	(United States) Arin Gilliland	Newcastle Jets
25 October 2017	Tameka Butt	Brisbane Roar
25 October 2017	Emily Shields	Melbourne City
25 October 2017	Adriana Taranto	Melbourne Victory
26 October 2017	Sophie Nenadovic	Newcastle Jets
26 October 2017	Gema Simon	Newcastle Jets
26 October 2017	Clare Wheeler	Newcastle Jets
26 October 2017	Shawn Billam	Perth Glory
26 October 2017	Kim Carroll	Perth Glory
26 October 2017	Patricia Charalambous	Perth Glory
26 October 2017	Gabrielle Dal Busco	Perth Glory
26 October 2017	Caitlin Doeglas	Perth Glory
26 October 2017	Jaymee Gibbons	Perth Glory
26 October 2017	Melissa Maizels	Perth Glory
26 October 2017	Natasha Rigby	Perth Glory
27 October 2017	(United States) Danielle Colaprico	Adelaide United
27 October 2017	(United States) Katie Naughton	Adelaide United
27 October 2017	Ashlee Brodigan	Newcastle Jets
27 October 2017	Tara Pender	Newcastle Jets
31 October 2017	Emily Gielnik	Brisbane Roar
3 November 2017	Sarah Willacy	Adelaide United
