= 2011–12 Newcastle Jets FC (women) season =

Newcastle Jets (W-League)
2011–12 season
- Chairman: Ray Baartz
- Head Coach: Clayton Zane
- Stadium: Adamstown Oval
- W-League: 5th
- W-League Finals: DNQ
- Top goalscorer: Lisa De Vanna (5)
- Highest home attendance: 985 vs. Sydney FC (12 November 2011); W-League
- Lowest home attendance: 377 vs. Perth Glory (21 December 2011); W-League
- Average home league attendance: 758
- Biggest win: 3–0 vs. Adelaide United (H) (29 October 2011); W-League
- Biggest defeat: 1–4 vs. Sydney FC (H) (12 November 2011); W-League
Home colours	Away colours

The 2011–12 season was Newcastle Jets Football Club's fourth season, in the W-League. Newcastle Jets finished 5th in their W-League season.

== Players ==
Note: Flags indicate national team as defined under FIFA eligibility rules; some limited exceptions apply. Players may hold more than one non-FIFA nationality.

No.	Pos.	Nation	Player
1	GK	AUS	Alison Logue
2	DF	AUS	Hannah Brewer
3	DF	AUS	Alanna Kennedy
4	DF	AUS	Gemma Pearce
5	DF	AUS	Alexandra Huynh
6	MF	AUS	Nicola Bolger
7	DF	AUS	Gema Simon
8	MF	AUS	Linda O'Neill
9	FW	AUS	Tara Andrews
10	MF	AUS	Emily van Egmond

No.	Pos.	Nation	Player
11	FW	AUS	Lisa De Vanna
12	FW	AUS	Monnique Kofoed
13	DF	ENG	Stacey Day
14	MF	AUS	Bronte Bates
15	FW	AUS	Rhali Dobson
16	DF	AUS	Cassandra Koppen
17	DF	GER	Ariane Hingst
20	FW	AUS	Nicole Jones
—	GK	AUS	Melissa Barbieri

== Transfers and contracts ==
=== Transfers in ===
No.	Position	Name	From	Type/fee	Date	Ref.
11	FW	Lisa De Vanna	Brisbane Roar	Free transfer	30 September 2011	
17	DF	(Germany) Ariane Hingst	Free agent	Free transfer	6 October 2011	
3	DF	Alanna Kennedy	Sydney FC	Free transfer	11 October 2011	
6	MF	Nicola Bolger	Sydney FC	Free transfer	11 October 2011	
8	MF	Linda O'Neill	Sydney FC	Free transfer	11 October 2011	
10	MF	Emily van Egmond	(Denmark) Fortuna Hjørring	Free transfer	11 October 2011	
4	DF	Gemma Pearce	Free agent	Free transfer	12 October 2011	
12	FW	Monnique Kofoed	Perth Glory	Free transfer	12 October 2011	
13	DF	(England) Stacey Day	Adelaide United	Free transfer	12 October 2011	
14	MF	Bronte Bates	Free agent	Free transfer	12 October 2011	
15	FW	Rhali Dobson	Free agent	Free transfer	12 October 2011	
16	DF	Casssandra Koppen	Free agent	Free transfer	12 October 2011	
—	GK	Melissa Barbieri	Melbourne Victory	Free transfer	12 October 2011	

=== Transfers out ===
No.	Position	Name	To	Type/fee	Date	Ref.
6	MF	Amber Neilson	Retired		30 January 2011	
22	GK	(United States) Alli Lipsher	(United States) Atlanta Beat	Free transfer	24 February 2011	
10	MF	Hayley Crawford	Free agent	Free transfer	12 October 2011	
11	FW	Sasha McDonnell	Brisbane Roar	Free transfer	17 October 2011	
4	DF	Thea Slatyer	Sydney FC	Free transfer	17 October 2011	

== Competitions ==
=== Overall record ===
Competition	First match	Last match	Starting round	Final position	Record							
Competition	First match	Last match	Starting round	Final position	Pld	W	D	L	GF	GA	GD	Win %
W-League	29 October 2011	14 January 2012	Matchday 1	5th	10	4	0	6	18	22	−4	40.00
Total					10	4	0	6	18	22	−4	40.00

Source: Competitions

=== W-League ===
==== League table ====
Pos	Team	Pld	W	D	L	GF	GA	GD	Pts	Qualification
1	Canberra United (C)	10	7	3	0	23	9	+14	24	Qualification to Finals series
2	Brisbane Roar	10	6	3	1	20	11	+9	21	Qualification to Finals series
3	Sydney FC	10	5	2	3	26	8	+18	17	Qualification to Finals series
4	Melbourne Victory	10	5	2	3	21	9	+12	17	Qualification to Finals series
5	Newcastle Jets	10	4	0	6	18	22	−4	12	
6	Perth Glory	10	2	0	8	11	36	−25	6	
7	Adelaide United	10	1	0	9	6	30	−24	3	

Source: au.soccerway.com
Rules for classification: 1) points; 2) goal difference; 3) number of goals scored.
(C) Champions

==== Results summary ====
Overall								Home						Away					
Pld	W	D	L	GF	GA	GD	Pts	W	D	L	GF	GA	GD	W	D	L	GF	GA	GD
10	4	0	6	18	22	−4	12	2	0	3	9	10	−1	2	0	3	9	12	−3

Source: worldfootball.net

==== Results by round ====
Round	1	2	3	4	5	7	8	9	6	10	11	12
Ground	B	H	A	H	A	A	B	H	H	A	H	A
Result	B	W	W	L	L	L	B	L	W	W	L	L
Position	5	3	2	3	5	5	5	5	4	5	5	5
Points	0	3	6	6	6	6	6	6	9	12	12	12

Source: worldfootball.net
A = Away; H = Home; W = Win; D = Draw; L = Loss

==== Matches ====
The league fixtures were announced on 27 September 2011.

Win Draw Loss

29 October 2011 2	Newcastle Jets	3–0	Adelaide United	Newcastle
14:00 AEDT	O'Neill 5'; De Vanna 47', 68'	Report		Stadium: Adamstown Oval; Attendance: 847; Referee: Casey Reibelt

5 November 2011 3	Brisbane Roar	2–3	Newcastle Jets	Brisbane
16:00 AEST	Alleway 18'; Gielnik 55'	Report	Andrews 24'; De Vanna 72', 83'	Stadium: Cleveland Showgrounds; Referee: Kate Jacewicz

12 November 2011 4	Newcastle Jets	1–4	Sydney FC	Newcastle
15:00 AEDT	Andrews 86'	Report	Walsh 46'; Slatyer 57'; Foord 64'; Garriock 76'	Stadium: Adamstown Oval; Attendance: 985; Referee: Casey Reibelt

19 November 2011 5	Canberra United	3–1	Newcastle Jets	Canberra
15:00 AEDT	Shipard 29'; Heyman 64', 80'	Report	Simon 77'	Stadium: McKellar Park; Attendance: 887; Referee: Kirralee Andruschak

3 December 2011 7	Melbourne Victory	2–1	Newcastle Jets	Geelong
15:00 AEDT	Taylor 41', 65'; Bolger 37'	Report		Stadium: Skilled Stadium; Referee: Catherine Hoffman

18 December 2011 9	Newcastle Jets	1–2	Canberra United	Newcastle
15:00 AEDT	Dobson 86'	Report	Hemmings 63'; Heyman 74'	Stadium: Adamstown Oval; Referee: Kirralee Andruschak

21 December 2011 6	Newcastle Jets	3–1	Perth Glory	Newcastle
15:00 AEDT	Andrews 23'; Bolger 55'; van Egmond 60'	Report	Holtham 78'	Stadium: Adamstown Oval; Attendance: 377; Referee: Katie Patterson
Note: Match originally scheduled for 26 November 2011, but postponed due to wet weather. It was rescheduled for 21 December 2011.

31 December 2011 10	Sydney FC	1–2	Newcastle Jets	Sydney
15:00 AEDT	Rollason 70'	Report	Simon 10'; Bolger 37'	Stadium: Campbelltown Stadium; Referee: Kirralee Andruschak

7 January 2012 11	Newcastle Jets	1–3	Brisbane Roar	Newcastle
15:00 AEDT	O'Neill 53'	Report	Harch 29'; Gielnik 69', 90'	Stadium: Adamstown Oval; Attendance: 822; Referee: Katie Patterson

14 January 2012 12	Perth Glory	4–2	Newcastle Jets	Perth
16:00 AWST	Jukic 9'; Hawkins 63'; D'Ovidio 72'; Tabain 82'	Report	De Vanna 76'; Kennedy 90'	Stadium: 6PR Stadium; Referee: Matthew Southern

== Statistics ==
=== Appearances and goals ===
Includes all competitions. Players with no appearances not included in the list.

No.	Pos.	Nat.	Name	W-League		Total	
No.	Pos.	Nat.	Name	Apps	Goals	Apps	Goals
1	GK	(Australia)	Alison Logue	1	0	1	0
2	DF	(Australia)	Hannah Brewer	5+4	0	9	0
3	DF	(Australia)	Alanna Kennedy	9	1	9	1
4	DF	(Australia)	Gemma Pearce	3+1	0	4	0
5	DF	(Australia)	Alexandra Huynh	6+3	0	9	0
6	MF	(Australia)	Nicola Bolger	10	3	10	3
7	DF	(Australia)	Gema Simon	9	2	9	2
8	MF	(Australia)	Linda O'Neill	9+1	2	10	2
9	FW	(Australia)	Tara Andrews	5+5	3	10	3
10	MF	(Australia)	Emily van Egmond	9	1	9	1
11	FW	(Australia)	Lisa De Vanna	9	5	9	5
12	FW	(Australia)	Monnique Kofoed	6+3	0	9	0
13	DF	(England)	Stacey Day	10	0	10	0
14	MF	(Australia)	Bronte Bates	0+2	0	2	0
15	FW	(Australia)	Rhali Dobson	0+8	0	8	0
17	DF	(Germany)	Ariane Hingst	10	0	10	0
20	FW	(Australia)	Nicole Jones	0+1	0	1	0
—	GK	(Australia)	Melissa Barbieri	9	0	9	0

=== Disciplinary record ===
Includes all competitions. The list is sorted by squad number when total cards are equal. Players with no cards not included in the list.

Rank	No.	Pos.	Nat.	Name	W-League			Total		
Rank	No.	Pos.	Nat.	Name	Booked	(yellow card) (yellow-red card)	Sent off (straight red)	Booked	(yellow card) (yellow-red card)	Sent off (straight red)
1	2	DF	(Australia)	Hannah Brewer	0	1	0	0	1	0
2	11	FW	(Australia)	Lisa De Vanna	4	0	0	4	0	0
3	17	DF	(Germany)	Ariane Hingst	2	0	0	2	0	0
4	5	DF	(Australia)	Alexandra Huynh	1	0	0	1	0	0
4	6	MF	(Australia)	Nicola Bolger	1	0	0	1	0	0
4	7	DF	(Australia)	Gema Simon	1	0	0	1	0	0
4	8	MF	(Australia)	Linda O'Neill	1	0	0	1	0	0
4	10	MF	(Australia)	Emily van Egmond	1	0	0	1	0	0
4	13	MF	(England)	Stacey Day	1	0	0	1	0	0
Total					12	1	0	12	1	0

=== Clean sheets ===
Includes all competitions. The list is sorted by squad number when total clean sheets are equal. Numbers in parentheses represent games where both goalkeepers participated and both kept a clean sheet; the number in parentheses is awarded to the goalkeeper who was substituted on, whilst a full clean sheet is awarded to the goalkeeper who was on the field at the start of play. Goalkeepers with no clean sheets not included in the list.

Rank	No.	Nat.	Goalkeeper	W-League	Total
1	—	(Australia)	Melissa Barbieri	1	1
