= 2017–18 Western Sydney Wanderers FC (women) season =

Western Sydney Wanderers W-League
2017–18 season
- Manager: Richard Byrne
- Stadium: Marconi Stadium, Sydney; ANZ Stadium, Sydney
- W-League: 8th
- Top goalscorer: Erica Halloway (3 goals)
- Highest home attendance: 8,449 vs. Sydney FC; 9 December 2017
- Lowest home attendance: 215 vs. Perth Glory; 1 December 2017
- Average home league attendance: 2,770
Home colours	Away colours

The 2017–18 Western Sydney Wanderers W-League season was their sixth season in the W-League, the premier competition for women's soccer in Australia. The team played home games both at Marconi Stadium and ANZ Stadium and the club was managed by Richard Byrne.

== Players ==
=== Squad information ===
Note: Flags indicate national team as defined under FIFA eligibility rules; some limited exceptions apply. Players may hold more than one non-FIFA nationality.

No.	Pos.	Nation	Player
1	GK	AUS	Jada Mathyssen-Whyman
2	DF	NED	Maruschka Waldus
3	MF	AUS	Jennifer Bisset
4	MF	AUS	Chloe O'Brien
5	MF	AUS	Kahlia Hogg
6	MF	USA	Lo'eau LaBonta (on loan from FC Kansas City)
7	DF	AUS	Ellie Brush (Co-Captain)
8	MF	AUS	Erica Halloway (Co-Captain)
9	FW	AUS	Rosie Sutton
10	FW	ISR	Lee Falkon
11	FW	NED	Marlous Pieëte

No.	Pos.	Nation	Player
12	FW	AUS	Rachel Lowe
13	MF	AUS	Olivia Price
14	MF	AUS	Sunny Franco
15	FW	AUS	Talitha Kramer
16	MF	AUS	Alix Roberts
17	DF	AUS	Katelyn Leadbetter
18	DF	AUS	Alexandra Huynh
19	FW	AUS	Susan Phonsongkham
20	GK	AUS	Trudy Burke
30	GK	AUS	Nicole Simonsen

=== Contract extensions ===
Position	Name
Head coach	(Australia) Richard Bryne
Assistant coach	
Goalkeeper coach	

== Squad statistics ==
N	Pos.	Nat.	Name	Total					W-League
N	Pos.	Nat.	Name	Apps	Goals	Yellow card	Second yellow card	Red card	Apps	Goals	Yellow card	Second yellow card	Red card
1	GK	(Australia)	Jada Mathyssen-Whyman	7	0	0	0	0	7+0	0	0	0	0
2	DF	(Netherlands)	Maruschka Waldus	8	0	1	0	0	8+0	0	1	0	0
3	MF	(Australia)	Jennifer Bisset	3	0	1	0	0	2+1	0	1	0	0
4	MF	(Australia)	Chloe O'Brien	1	0	0	0	0	0+1	0	0	0	0
5	MF	(Australia)	Kahlia Hogg	8	0	0	0	0	6+2	0	0	0	0
6	MF	(United States)	Lo'eau LaBonta	8	1	0	0	0	8+0	1	0	0	0
7	DF	(Australia)	Ellie Brush	8	1	1	0	0	8+0	1	1	0	0
8	MF	(Australia)	Erica Halloway	8	2	0	0	0	7+1	2	0	0	0
9	FW	(Australia)	Rosie Sutton	6	1	0	0	0	4+2	1	0	0	0
10	FW	(Israel)	Lee Falkon	8	1	1	0	0	7+1	1	1	0	0
11	FW	(Netherlands)	Marlous Pieëte	8	1	1	0	0	8+0	1	1	0	0
12	FW	(Australia)	Rachel Lowe	4	0	0	0	0	2+2	0	0	0	0
13	MF	(Australia)	Olivia Price	4	0	0	0	0	3+1	0	0	0	0
14	MF	(Australia)	Sunny Franco	2	0	1	0	0	1+1	0	1	0	0
15	FW	(Australia)	Talitha Kramer	7	0	0	0	0	7+0	0	0	0	0
16	MF	(Australia)	Alix Roberts	6	0	2	0	0	6+0	0	2	0	0
17	DF	(Australia)	Katelyn Leadbetter	1	0	0	0	0	0+1	0	0	0	0
18	DF	(Australia)	Alexandra Huynh	0	0	0	0	0	0+0	0	0	0	0
19	FW	(Australia)	Susan Phonsongkham	4	0	0	0	0	3+1	0	0	0	0
20	GK	(Australia)	Trudy Burke	1	0	0	0	0	1+0	0	0	0	0
30	GK	(Australia)	Nicole Simonsen	0	0	0	0	0	0+0	0	0	0	0

- Last updated: 4 January 2018
- (yellow card) = Number of bookings; (second yellow card) = Number of sending offs after a second yellow card; (red card) = Number of sending offs by a direct red card.

== Competitions ==
=== W-League ===
==== League table ====
Pos	Team	Pld	W	D	L	GF	GA	GD	Pts	Qualification
1	Brisbane Roar	12	9	1	2	21	12	+9	28	Qualification to Finals series
2	Sydney FC	12	8	1	3	26	16	+10	25	Qualification to Finals series
3	Newcastle Jets	12	6	2	4	26	21	+5	20	Qualification to Finals series
4	Melbourne City (C)	12	6	2	4	20	15	+5	20	Qualification to Finals series
5	Canberra United	12	5	1	6	24	27	−3	16	
6	Perth Glory	12	4	2	6	25	27	−2	14	
7	Melbourne Victory	12	3	2	7	15	19	−4	11	
8	Western Sydney Wanderers	12	3	2	7	13	21	−8	11	
9	Adelaide United	12	3	1	8	15	27	−12	10	

Source: A-Leagues
Rules for classification: 1) points; 2) goal difference; 3) number of goals scored.
(C) Champions

==== Results summary ====
Overall								Home						Away					
Pld	W	D	L	GF	GA	GD	Pts	W	D	L	GF	GA	GD	W	D	L	GF	GA	GD
12	3	2	7	13	21	−8	11	1	1	3	4	7	−3	2	1	4	9	14	−5

Last updated: 4 February 2018.
Source: Competitive Matches

==== Results by round ====
Round	1	2	3	4	5	6	7	8	9	10	11	12	13	14
Ground	A	H	H	B	A	H	H	A	H	B	A	H	A	A
Result	L	W	L	✖	D	L	L	W	L	✖	L	D	W	L
Position	6	3	8	7	6	8	8	8	8	8	8	8	8	8

Updated to match(es) played on 4 February 2018. Source: Competitive Matches
A = Away; H = Home; B = Bye; W = Win; D = Draw; L = Loss

==== Matches ====
Win Draw Loss

29 October 2017 1	Newcastle Jets	2–1	Western Sydney Wanderers	Newcastle
14:30 AEDT	Stengel 14'; Kingsley 78'	Report	Halloway 77'	Stadium: McDonald Jones Stadium; Attendance: 4,168; Referee: Lara Lee

29 October 2017 2	Western Sydney Wanderers	2–1	Adelaide United	Sydney
14:30 AEDT	LaBonta 13'; Sutton 90+1'	Report	Doniak 22'	Stadium: Marconi Stadium; Attendance: 532; Referee: Casey Reibelt

10 November 2017 3	Western Sydney Wanderers	0–1	Brisbane Roar	Sydney
19:30 AEDT		Report	Pickett 30'	Stadium: Marconi Stadium; Attendance: 389; Referee: Rachel Mitchenson

24 November 2017 5	Melbourne Victory	1–1	Western Sydney Wanderers	Melbourne
19:30 AEDT	Dowie 63'	Report	Halloway 42'	Stadium: Lakeside Stadium; Attendance: 336; Referee: Lara Lee

1 December 2017 6	Western Sydney Wanderers	0–1	Perth Glory	Melbourne
16:30 AEDT		Report	Kerr 50'	Stadium: Marconi Stadium; Attendance: 215; Referee: Maddison Kennedy

9 December 2017 7	Western Sydney Wanderers	1–3	Sydney FC	Sydney
17:00 AEDT	Brush 41' (pen.)	Report	Siemsen 21', 24'; De Vanna 62'	Stadium: ANZ Stadium; Attendance: 8,449; Referee: Kelly Jones

15 December 2017 8	Adelaide United	1–2	Western Sydney Wanderers	Adelaide
20:00 ACST	Doniak 31'	Report	Pieëte 23'; Falkon 72'	Stadium: Marden Sports Complex; Attendance: 739; Referee: Rebecca Durcau

1 January 2018 9	Western Sydney Wanderers	0–1	Melbourne City	Sydney
17:20 AEDT		Report	Fishlock 90+2'	Stadium: ANZ Stadium; Attendance: 4,178; Referee: Kate Jacewicz

14 January 2018 11	Canberra United	2–0	Western Sydney Wanderers	Canberra
16:30 AEDT	Heyman 76'; Thorsnes 77'	Report		Stadium: McKellar Park; Attendance: 1,464; Referee: Casey Reibelt

19 January 2018 12	Western Sydney Wanderers	1–1	Melbourne Victory	Sydney
17:20 AEDT	Phonsongkham 24'	Report	Dowie 51'	Stadium: ANZ Stadium; Attendance: 2,859; Referee: Kelly Jones

28 January 2018 13	Perth Glory	3–4	Western Sydney Wanderers	Perth
23:15 AWST	Kerr 51', 61'; Hill 78'	Report	Lowe 1'; Brush 4'; Price 88'; Halloway 90'	Stadium: nib Stadium; Attendance: 1,015; Referee: Casey Reibelt

4 February 2018 14	Sydney FC	4–1	Western Sydney Wanderers	Sydney
16:00 AEDT	Logarzo 25'; Foord 32'; Cooper 41'; Siemsen 46'	Report	Waldus 86'	Stadium: Seymour Shaw Park; Attendance: 2,519; Referee: Rachel Mitchenson

== See also ==
- 2017–18 Western Sydney Wanderers FC season
