= 2009 AFC U-16 Women's Championship qualification =

Tournament details
- Dates: 8–17 November 2008
- Teams: 9 (from 1 confederation)

Tournament statistics
- Matches played: 16
- Goals scored: 112 (7 per match)

The 2009 AFC U-16 Women's Championship qualification was qualification section of 2009 AFC U-16 Women's Championship. It was held from November 8 to 17 in Kuala Lumpur, Malaysia.

== Group stage ==
=== Qualifying Group A ===
All matches were held at MBPJ Stadium, Kuala Lumpur, Malaysia.

Team	Pts	Pld	W	D	L	GF	GA	GD
Australia	12	4	4	0	0	43	0	+43
Thailand	7	4	2	1	1	22	3	+19
Myanmar	7	4	2	1	1	18	5	+13
Philippines	3	4	1	0	3	3	35	−32
Singapore	0	4	0	0	4	1	44	−43

- Jordan withdrew.
2008-11-08

Singapore	0–17	Australia
	Report	Searl 9'; Hatzirodos 11', 35', 6?'; Foord 17', 21', 24', 3?', 50', 78'; Allen 19', 41'; Wallace 68', 84', 89'; Azeman 74' (o.g.); Stott 87'

2008-11-08

Thailand	1–1	Myanmar
Cumpinij 90+1'	Report	Ngwe Swe Tar Yar 19'

2008-11-10

Australia	4–0	Myanmar
Kerr 3'; Andrews 48'; Allen 60'; Bolger 74'	Report

2008-11-10

Singapore	1–3	Philippines
Noor Aziz 68'	Report	Constantino 6'; De Los Reyes 59'; Navea-Huff 90+1'

2008-11-12

Myanmar	11–0	Singapore
Hla Yin Win 14', 18', 25', 50', 65'; Hto Ray Zar 16'; Ngwe Swe Tar Yar 30', 58', 76', 81'; Htet Thaigi Aye 44'	Report

2008-11-12

Philippines	0–8	Thailand
	Report	Tanasan 23'; Boontan 37'; Pra-ang 39', 72'; Kham-uan 54'; Kongthip 57'; Promwang 84'; Cumpinij 90+2'

2008-11-15

Philippines	0–20	Australia
	Report	Stott 14', 32'; Foord 17', 34', 45'; Wallace 23', 42'; Kennedy 30', 88'; Hatzirodos 44', 49', 8?'; Whitfield 54', 65', 81'; Gibbons 59'; Searl 61'; Andrews 64', 73', 90+2'

2008-11-15

Thailand	13–0	Singapore
Kongthip 11', 16', 21', 23', 48'; Bunterngjai 25'; Sripheng 39'; Cumpinij 50', 86'; Pra-ang 53', 8?'; Hotaisong 78', 90+1'	Report

2008-11-17

Myanmar	6–0	Philippines
Hla Yin Win 14', 3?'; Ferida Saw Su Htwe 24'; Htet Thaigi Aye 28', 33'; Ngwe Swe Tar Yar 81'	Report

2008-11-17

Australia	2–0	Thailand
van Egmond 49'; Andrews 89'	Report

=== Qualifying Group B ===
All matches were held at KLFA Stadium, Kuala Lumpur, Malaysia.

Team	Pts	Pld	W	D	L	GF	GA	GD
China	9	3	3	0	0	16	1	+15
Chinese Taipei	6	3	2	0	1	4	7	−3
India	3	3	1	0	2	4	4	0
Uzbekistan	0	3	0	0	3	1	13	−12

2008-11-09

Chinese Taipei	1–6	China
Yang Ching 14'	Report	Zhang Jieli 24'; Zhao Xue 34'; Ni Mengjie 52', 69', 87'; Wang Shuang 83'

2008-11-09

India	3–1	Uzbekistan
Premi Devi 32'; Elangbam 86'; Devi Salam 90+2'	Report	Selime Gugueva 41'

2008-11-11

Chinese Taipei	1–0	Uzbekistan
Yang Shu-ting 30'	Report

2008-11-11

China	1–0	India
Zhang Jieli 34'	Report

2008-11-13

Uzbekistan	0–9	China
	Report	Zhao Xue 22', 76'; Han Yuan 33'; Sun Shuyi 38'; Li Xiang 57'; Sun Wen 58'; Su Xin 71'; Jamolova 79' (o.g.); Xue Jiao 90+1'

2008-11-13

Chinese Taipei	2–1	India
Sung Hui-ling 24'; Yang Ching 90+1'	Report	Jabamani 6'

=== Ranking of third-placed teams ===
Team	Pts	Pld	W	D	L	GF	GA	GD
Myanmar	4	3	1	1	1	7	5	+2
India	3	3	1	0	2	4	4	0

- Note: Myanmar's match against fifth-placed team Singapore was excluded.

== Qualified Teams ==
=== Automatically qualified ===
- North Korea (2007 champions)
- Japan (2007 runners-up)
- South Korea (2007 3rd place)

=== Qualified via competition ===
- Australia (Group A winners)
- Thailand (Group A runners-up)
- China (Group B winners)
- Chinese Taipei (Group B runners-up)
- Myanmar (overall fifth)
