= Xue Jiao =

Chinese footballer

Personal information
- Date of birth: January 30, 1993 (age 33)
- Place of birth: China,
- Height: 1.71 m (5 ft 7 in)
- Position: Defender

Team information
- Current team: Wuhan Jianghan University
- Number: 26

Senior career*
Years	Team	Apps	(Gls)
?	Dalian	0	(0)
?	Wuhan Jianghan University	0	(0)

International career
2016-	China	27	(0)
- * Club domestic league appearances and goals

Xue Jiao (born January 30, 1993) is a Chinese footballer. She represented China in the football competition at the 2016 Summer Olympics. Xue also plays for Wuhan Jianghan University in the Chinese Women's Super League.
