= Nina Frausing-Pedersen =

Danish women's footballer (born 1991)

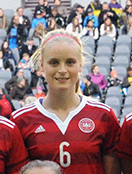

Personal information
- Date of birth: 20 June 1991 (age 35)
- Place of birth: Copenhagen, Denmark
- Height: 1.73 m (5 ft 8 in)
- Position: Defender

Youth career
- –2008: IK Skovbakken

College career
Years	Team	Apps	(Gls)
2010–2011	Texas Longhorns	31	(2)
2012–2013	California Golden Bears	38	(2)

Senior career*
Years	Team	Apps	(Gls)
2008–2010	IK Skovbakken	2	(0)
2014	Liverpool	8	(0)
2015	Turbine Potsdam	8	(2)
2015–2016	Fortuna Hjørring	16	
2016	Rosengård	1	(0)
2016–2017	Brisbane Roar	11	(0)
2017	Brøndby		
2020–2021	ASA Tel Aviv	4	(0)

International career
2008	Denmark U-17	1	(0)
2008–2010	Denmark U-19	18	(2)
2014	Denmark U-23	2	(0)
2014–2015	Denmark	7	(0)
- * Club domestic league appearances and goals

Nina Frausing-Pedersen (born 20 June 1991) is a Danish former footballer who played as a defender.

== Career ==
Frausing played for Swedish club FC Rosengård, Liverpool and Brøndby IF. She also played for the Denmark women's national football team. In 2016, she began playing for the Brisbane Roar FC (W-League). She previously played for 1. FFC Turbine Potsdam of the Frauen-Bundesliga, for Fortuna Hjørring of the Elitedivisionen and for Liverpool of the FA WSL.

== Honours ==
=== Club ===
Liverpool

- FA WSL Winner (1): 2014
