= Tiffany Boshers =

American soccer player

Personal information
- Full name: Tiffany Marie Boshers
- Date of birth: December 1, 1982 (age 43)
- Place of birth: Sun Valley, California, United States
- Height: 5 ft 4 in (1.63 m)
- Position: Midfielder

College career
Years	Team	Apps	(Gls)
2001–2005	Baylor Bears		

Senior career*
Years	Team	Apps	(Gls)
2012–2013	Newcastle Jets	10	(0)
- * Club domestic league appearances and goals as of October 15, 2015

Tiffany Marie Boshers (born December 1, 1982) is an American soccer player. She played for the Newcastle Jets in the Australian W-League from 2012–2013.

== Playing career ==
=== Baylor University, 2001–2005 ===
Boshers attended Baylor University from 2001 to 2005 where she played for the Baylor Bears.

=== Newscastle Jets, 2012–2013 ===
Boshers signed with the Newcastle Jets in 2013. She made her debut for the team during a match against Sydney on October 21, 2012. During the 2012–13 W-League season, she made ten appearances for Newcastle. The team finished in seventh place with a 1–8–3 record.

== See also ==
- List of foreign W-League (Australia) players
