= Eliza Campbell =

Australian football player (born 1995)

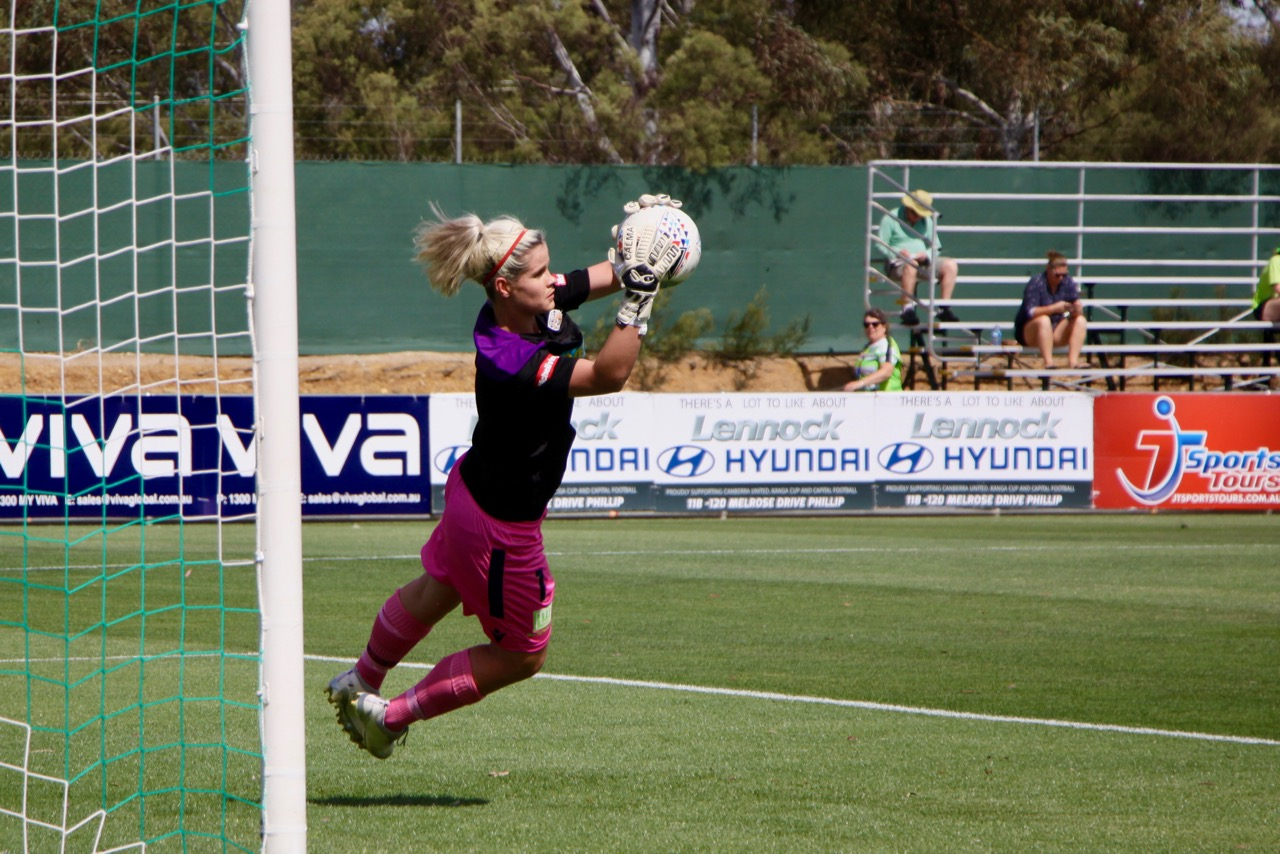

Personal information
- Full name: Eliza Monique Campbell
- Date of birth: 16 May 1995 (age 31)
- Place of birth: Cobaki, Australia
- Height: 1.75 m (5 ft 9 in)
- Position: Goalkeeper

Team information
- Current team: Sydney FC
- Number: 40

Youth career
- QAS

Senior career*
Years	Team	Apps	(Gls)
2012–2014	Newcastle Jets	23	(0)
2014–2016	Medkila	17	(0)
2016	Klepp	21	(0)
2016–2018	Adelaide United	10	(0)
2018–2020	Perth Glory	24	(0)
2021–	Sydney FC	0	(0)
2024	Treaty United W.F.C.	0	(0)

International career^{‡}
2011	Australia U-17	3	(0)
2012–2014	Australia U-20	4	(0)
2017–	Australia	2	(0)
- * Club domestic league appearances and goals as of 24 August 2018 ‡ National team caps and goals as of 6 March 2019

Eliza Monique Campbell (born 16 May 1995) is an Australian international women's soccer player who currently plays for Sydney FC in A-League Women (formerly W-League). She has previously played for Australian teams Newcastle Jets, Adelaide United and Perth Glory. Between 2014 and 2016, Campbell played for Medkila and Klepp in the Norwegian Toppserien. Campbell has played for the Australia women's national soccer team.

== Playing career ==
=== Club career ===
Campbell began playing at the age of seven in Bilambil.

As a 17-year-old, Campbell made her W-League debut for the Newcastle Jets in October 2012.

In 2014, Campbell joined Medkila in the Norwegian Toppserien. After two seasons, she joined fellow Norwegian club Klepp.

Ahead of the 2016–17 W-League, Campbell joined Adelaide United.

After spending two season at Adelaide United, Campbell signed with Perth Glory for the 2018-19 W-League Season.

In March 2021, she joined Sydney FC as an injury replacement player for Katie Offer.

=== International career ===
In 2013, Campbell was called up for the Australia women's national soccer team, sitting on the bench for a match against China in Wollongong.

Campbell made her international debut on 22 November 2017, against China.
