= Grace Macintyre =

Australian soccer player (born 1996)

Personal information
- Full name: Grace Macintyre
- Date of birth: 30 April 1996 (age 30)
- Place of birth: Australia
- Height: 1.79 m (5 ft 10 in)
- Position: Defender

Youth career
- Kotara Juniors
- Adamstown Rosebuds
- Hamilton Olympic
- Newcastle
- Northern NSW

Senior career*
Years	Team	Apps	(Gls)
2012–2017	Newcastle Jets	26	(0)

International career
2009	Australia U-14		
2011	Australia U-17		
2013	Australia U-20	3	(0)
- * Club domestic league appearances and goals as of 5 March 2017

Grace Macintyre is an Australian soccer player who last played as a defender for the Newcastle Jets in the Australian W-league.

== Club career ==
Macintyre started playing soccer at the age of 6 with the local club Kotara Bears. Six years later she joined Newcastle Jets' Emerging Jets program. In 2012, she debuted in the W-League for the Newcastle Jets senior team at the age of 16.

Macintyre missed the 2015–16 W-League season due to injury. Upon her return to play during the first round of the 2016–17 W-League season, she switched from playing as an attacker to playing as a defender, tagging Melbourne City's left-back Steph Catley, performing very well to draw praise from her coach, Craig Deans. Despite her great performances over the season, following a knee reconstruction, Macintyre didn't re-sign with the Newcastle Jets.

As well as playing at the senior level, Macintyre also represented Merewether United of the Women's Premier League during the 2017 season.

== International career ==
Macintyre was selected in 2009 by the Australian under-14 team, firstly as part of a training camp at the Australian Institute of Sport in Canberra, and subsequently as part of the squad selected to play in the Asian Football Confederation Under-14 Girls Festival of Football in Ho Chi Minh City in Vietnam. In 2011, she was selected by the Australian under-17 team for their New Zealand tour. Two years later she was selected by the Australian under-20 team to participate in the 2013 AFC U-19 Women's Championship in China. She started one game in the tournament, in Australia's only victory, which was against Myanmar.

== Style of play ==
Macintyre started out playing as a forward and later converted to a defender position.

== Personal life ==
Macintyre studied occupational therapy at the University of Newcastle, while working as a nanny and a support worker.
