= Con Constantine =

Cypriot Australian businessman (born 1945)

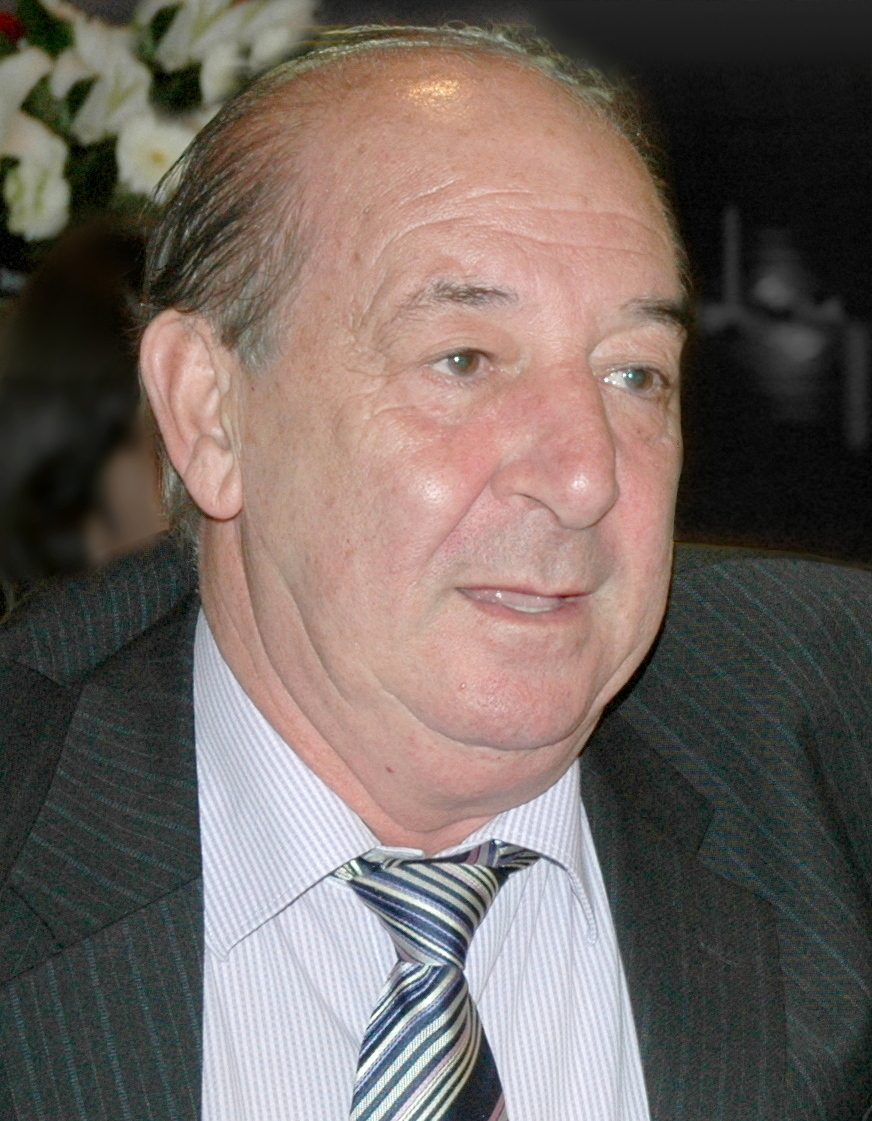
- Con Constantine
- Born: 1 July 1945 (age 81)
- Occupation: Businessman

Con Constantine (born 1 July 1945) is a Cypriot Australian businessman and the former owner of the Australian football (soccer) club Newcastle United Jets.

== Biography ==
=== Early life ===
Con Constantine migrated to Australia with his parents and siblings from the town of Maroni, near Larnaka, Cyprus, at the age of 10. At a young age, he started working in a takeaway food store before going on to sell houseplants.

In 1985, he built Parklea Markets (on the site of a former drive-in cinema), initially operating it as a plant nursery while seeking council approval. After approval was granted, Parklea Markets quickly established itself as one of the premier retail destinations in Western Sydney.

In recent years, Constantine has expanded his interests to Newcastle, 150 km north of Sydney, where he is the owner of The Store. He recently purchased two Newcastle community papers, the Newcastle & Lake Macquarie Post and the Hunter Post, from Fairfax Media. Constantine is a supporter of his local Blacktown Greek Orthodox parish as well as many legitimate Sydney and Newcastle charities.

=== Newcastle United Jets ===
Constantine was the owner and chairman of Newcastle United Jets, an Australian professional football (soccer) club based in Newcastle. The club competes in the A-League and plays its home games at the Newcastle International Sports Centre. They were the A-League Champions for the 2007–08 A-League season, after defeating the Central Coast Mariners 1-0 in the Grand Final. The club was formed in 2000 when it joined the National Soccer League as Newcastle United.

Constantine replaced Jets' manager Richard Money with an Australian, Nick Theodorakopoulos, for the 2006/2007 A-League season. Theodorakopoulos was sacked as manager after a lacklustre start to the season. The new coach was Gary van Egmond with support from assistant coach Mark Jones. For the 2009–10 season, former Sydney FC coach Branko Culina was appointed head coach after Gary van Egmond's shock departure.

Constantine chose to bring in controversial striker Mario Jardel to Newcastle. The Brazilian legend had a successful career, but was out of shape and out of form by the time he arrived at the Jets. Constantine has invested over $15 million into the Newcastle Jets.

After an unsuccessful 2008/2009 season, a group of Newcastle supporters staged a small protest by hanging all their banners upside down. Constantine invited the leaders of the group to his corporate box and allegedly threatened them. The incident was investigated by the Football Federation Australia.

On 22 September 2010, Con was stripped of his licence of the Newcastle Jets. The team was taken over on a short-term basis by local businessman Nathan Tinkler. Constantine made a tearful farewell press conference and accused the FFA of backstabbing him.
