= Chloe O'Brien =

Chloe O'Brien may refer to:

- Chloe O'Brien (soccer)
- Chloe O'Brien (darts player)

== See also ==
- Chloe O'Brian, a character from the American television series 24
