= Sanna Frostevall =

Swedish footballer

Personal information
- Full name: Sanna Frostevall
- Date of birth: 29 August 1979 (age 47)
- Place of birth: Ångermanland, Sweden
- Height: 1.75 m (5 ft 9 in)

Youth career
- Arnäs IF

Senior career*
Years	Team	Apps	(Gls)
1999–2005	Själevads IK		
2006–2008	Sunnanå SK		
2008–2009	Newcastle United Jets	7	(1)
2009	Sunnanå SK	13	(1)
2010	Själevads IK		

Managerial career
- 2014: Själevads IK (assistant)
- * Club domestic league appearances and goals as of January 12, 2011

Sanna Frostevall (born 29 August 1979) is a Swedish former association footballer who played in the Damallsvenskan for Sunnanå SK. She played for the Newcastle United Jets in the 2008-09 Australian W-League season.

== Career ==
Born in Ångermanland, Frostevall began playing football with Skellefteå club Själevads IK. She played six seasons in the Damallsvenskan, four of them with Sunnanå SK, including a fifth-place finish in 2007. Frostevall retired from playing in January 2011 after being unable to rehabilitate a knee injury while working full-time.

After she retired from playing, she became an assistant manager for Själevads IK.
