= Madeline Searl =

Australian soccer player

Personal information
- Full name: Madeline Ella Searl
- Date of birth: 10 February 1994 (age 32)
- Place of birth: Newcastle, Australia
- Height: 1.69 m (5 ft 6 1/2 in)
- Positions: Central midfielder; winger

Senior career*
Years	Team	Apps	(Gls)
2009–2011	Newcastle Jets	9	(0)
2012	Lake Macquarie	17	(0)
2012–2013	Newcastle Jets	11	(0)
2013	Lake Macquarie	22	(7)
2013–2014	Newcastle Jets	9	(0)

International career
2009	Australia U-16		
- * Club domestic league appearances and goals as of 18 March 2015

Madeline Ella Searl (born 10 February 1994) is an Australian soccer player, who played for Newcastle Jets in the Australian W-League.

== Club career ==
Searl played for Lake Macquarie. She joined Newcastle Jets and helped at an NNSW school soccer gala together with Ben Kennedy, Ben Kantarovski, and Tara Andrews. In December 2013, Searl suffered an anterior cruciate ligament injury, which followed previous problems of chronic fatigue, two broken ankles and a hamstring injury.

== International career ==
In November 2008, Searl was called up to Australia's U-16 national team for the 2009 AFC U-16 Women's Championship qualification tournament. She scored twice in the campaign, once in a 17–0 victory over Singapore and once in a 20–0 victory over Philippines. A year later, she was selected for the 23-person squad for the tournament itself.
