= Libby Sharpe =

Australian soccer player

Personal information
- Date of birth: 27 November 1991 (age 34)
- Place of birth: Australia
- Height: 1.76 m (5 ft 9 in)

Team information
- Current team: Newcastle United Jets

Senior career*
Years	Team	Apps	(Gls)
2008–	Newcastle United Jets	6	(0)
- * Club domestic league appearances and goals as of 8 August 2009

Libby Sharpe (born 27 November 1991) is an Australian football (soccer) player currently playing for Newcastle United Jets.

Sharpe represented NSW at ten years of age and in 2007 played in the Australian under 17s side. She plays in the full-back position.
