= Nicole Jones =

Bermudian cricketer (born 1963)

Personal information
- Born: 18 August 1963 (age 62)
- Batting: Right-handed
- Role: Batter

International information
- National side: Bermuda
- Source: Cricinfo, 8 December 2017

Nicole Jones (born 18 August 1963) is a former Bermudian woman cricketer. She played for Bermuda at the 2008 Women's Cricket World Cup Qualifier.
