= Amber Neilson =

Australian soccer player

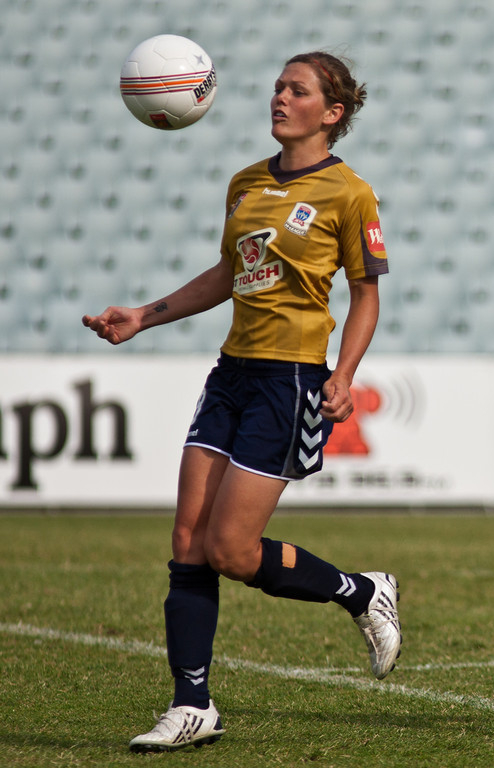
- Neilson playing for Newcastle Jets in 2010

Personal information
- Date of birth: 14 December 1984 (age 41)
- Place of birth: Australia
- Position: Midfielder

Senior career*
Years	Team	Apps	(Gls)
2008–2011	Newcastle Jets	30	(3)
2014	Newcastle Jets	12	(0)

International career^{‡}
2002	Australia U-19		
2006–2010	Australia	14	(0)
- * Club domestic league appearances and goals as of 13 May 2021 ‡ National team caps and goals as of 12 July 2010

Amber Neilson (born 14 December 1984) is an Australian retired soccer player who played for Newcastle Jets in the Australian W-League.

== Playing career ==
=== Club career ===
Neilson played for Newcastle Jets in the Australian W-League.

Neilson retired from football after the final game of the 2010–11 W-League season.

Before the 2014 season, Neilson came out of retirement, re-signing with Newcastle Jets. At the end of the season she returned to retirement.

=== International career ===
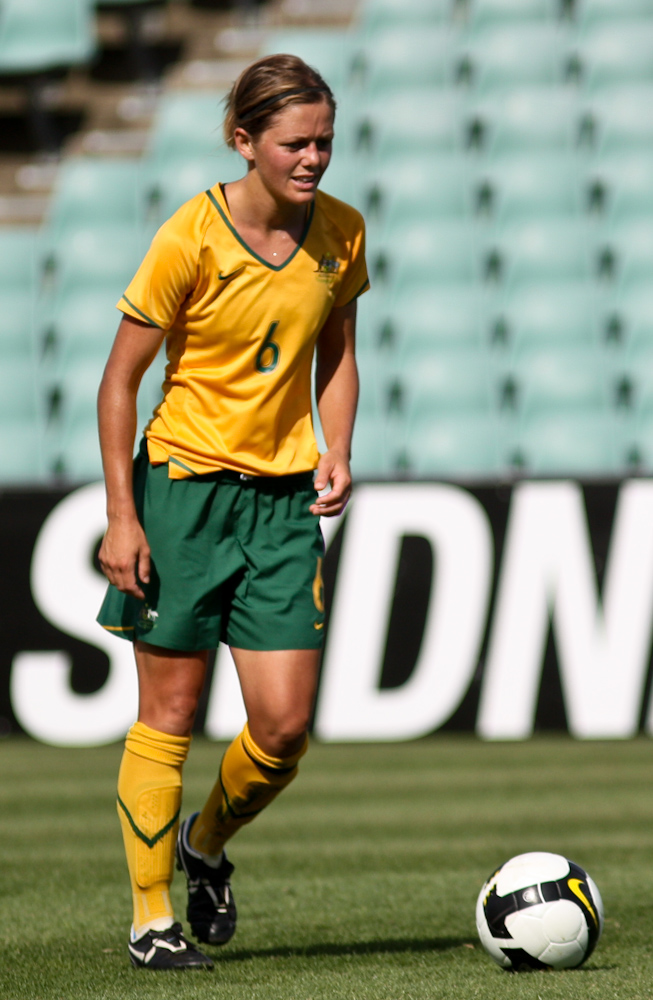
Neilson playing for Australia

She played three matches at the 2002 FIFA U-19 Women's World Championship in Canada.

Neilson also represented Australia at senior international level.
