= Gema Simon =

Australian soccer player

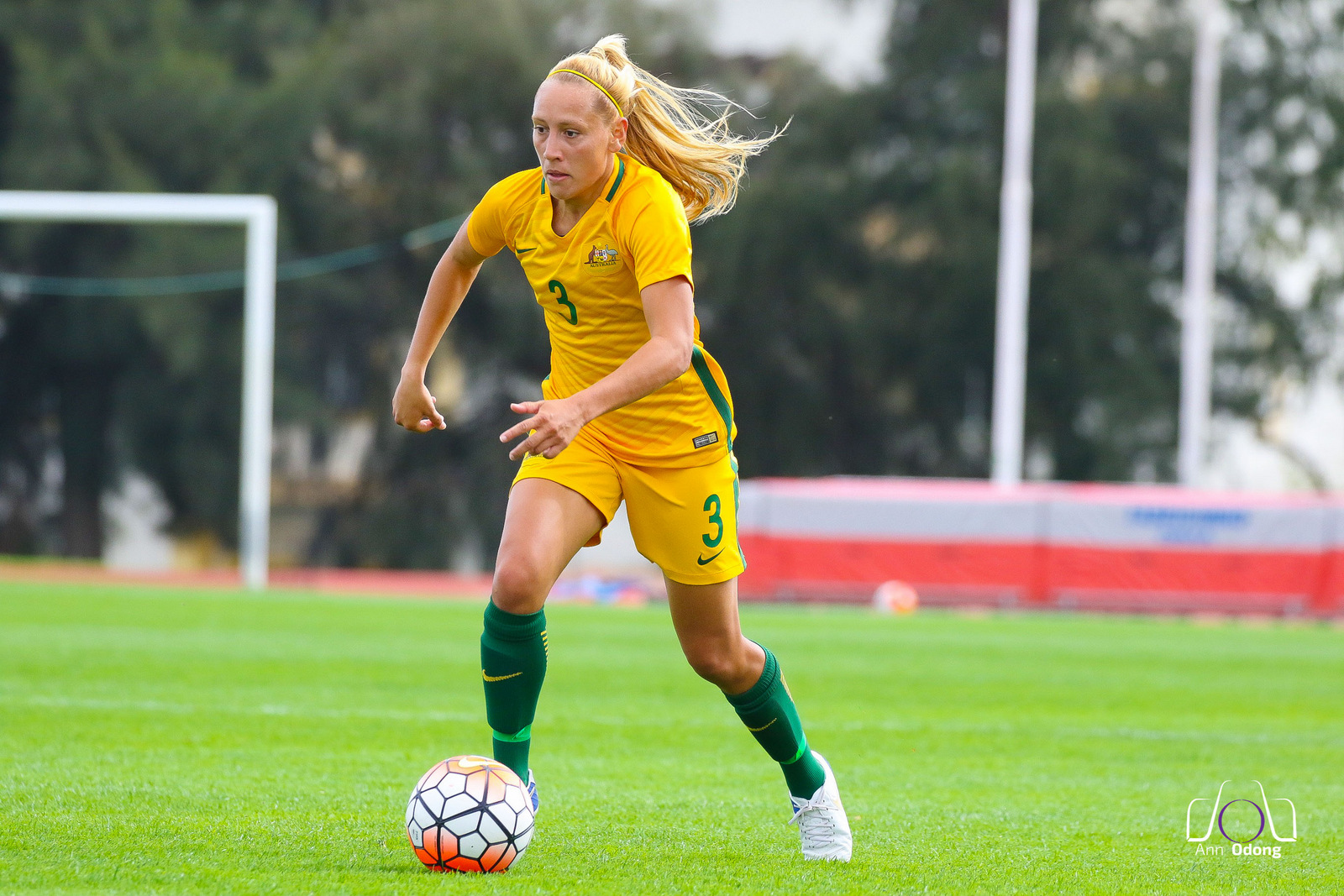
- Simon playing for the Matildas at the 2017 Algarve Cup

Personal information
- Full name: Gema Ann Joyce Simon
- Date of birth: 19 July 1990 (age 36)
- Place of birth: Armidale, Australia
- Height: 1.60 m (5 ft 3 in)
- Positions: Left back; winger

Team information
- Current team: Newcastle Jets
- Number: 7

Senior career*
Years	Team	Apps	(Gls)
2008–2014	Newcastle Jets	63	(4)
2013	→ Ottawa Fury (loan)		
2014–2015	Melbourne Victory	11	(2)
2015–2022	Newcastle Jets	67	(4)
2016	→ Suwon (loan)		
2017	→ Avaldsnes (loan)	13	(0)
2022	Þróttur Reykjavík	15	(0)
2022–2023	Melbourne Victory	6	(0)
2023–2024	Newcastle Jets	4	(0)

International career
2009	Australia U20	1	(0)
2014–2019	Australia	11	(0)
- * Club domestic league appearances and goals

Gema Ann Joyce Simon (born 19 July 1990) is an Australian former international soccer player who played for Newcastle Jets, Melbourne Victory, Ottawa Fury, Suwon, Avaldsnes, Þróttur Reykjavík, and the Australia women's national soccer team.

== Early life ==
Simon was born in Armidale. She is an Indigenous Australian, and grew up the eldest of three siblings. Her cousin, Kyah Simon, is also an Australian international footballer. Gema started playing football aged five.

== Playing career ==
=== Club ===
Simon was a member of the inaugural Newcastle Jets team in the W-League in 2008–09.

In May 2013, Simon joined USL W-League side Ottawa Fury. She was not paid for her time at the club, but did receive off-field assistance. She suffered an injury one month into the season and did not recover during her remaining two months with the side.

In 2013, Simon was given the captaincy of the Jets. She was awarded the Jets' Player of the Year award for the 2013–14 season

After captaining Newcastle Jets in the 2013–14 season, Simon joined Melbourne Victory alongside Hannah Brewer.

In October 2015, Simon re-joined the Newcastle Jets.

After a rewarding season with Newcastle Jets, Simon signed a deal to play the winter season with Suwon in the WK League.

After her loan at Suwon, Simon was announced as captain of Newcastle Jets once more.

In September 2023, Simon returned once more to Newcastle Jets, where she retired at the end of the season.

=== International ===
In mid-2009, Simon was called up to the Australia under-20 team for the 2009 AFC U-19 Women's Championship. She made her debut for the side in a pre-tournament friendly against South Korea in July 2009.

Simon was first called up to the Australian senior side for the 2014 Cyprus Cup. She made her debut for the team in March 2014, playing a full match in a loss to Scotland in the group stage of the tournament. She was again included in the Australia squad for the 2015 Cyprus Cup.

== Honours ==
Australia

- Tournament of Nations: 2017

Individual

- Newcastle Jets Player of the Year: 2009–10, 2013–14

== See also ==
- List of association football families
