= Alexandra Huynh =

Australian footballer (born 1994)

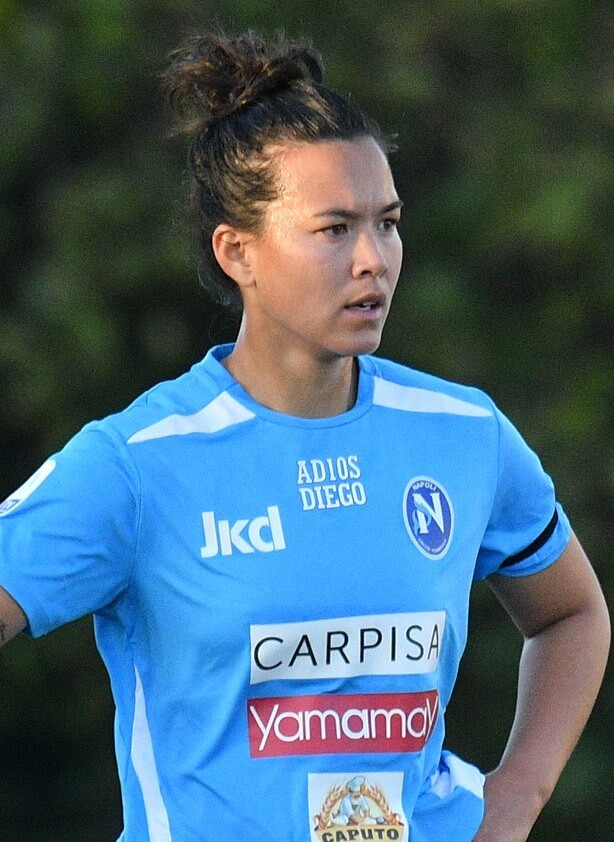
- Huynh with Napoli in 2020

Personal information
- Full name: Alexandra Bao Yen Huynh
- Date of birth: 25 July 1994 (age 32)
- Place of birth: Sadleir, New South Wales, Australia
- Height: 1.67 m (5 ft 6 in)
- Position: Defender

Team information
- Current team: Western City Rangers Women’s NPL
- Number: 7

Youth career
- 2008-2012: Marconi Stallions -NPL

College career
Years	Team	Apps	(Gls)
2013–2015	Colorado Buffaloes	55	(0)
2016	Troy Trojans	18	(0)

Senior career*
Years	Team	Apps	(Gls)
2010–2012	Newcastle Jets	17	(0)
2012–2013	Western Sydney Wanderers	11	(0)
2018–2020	Western Sydney Wanderers	13	(0)
2020–2021	Napoli	14	(0)
2021–2022	Fortuna Hjørring	3	(0)
2022	Western Sydney Wanderers	6	(0)
2022–2023	Macarthur Rams	38	(2)
2023–2024	Newcastle Jets	14	(1)

International career^{‡}
2008–2009	Australia U17	7	(0)
2021	Australia	1	(0)
- * Club domestic league appearances and goals as of 28 May 2024 ‡ National team caps and goals as of 11 April 2021

Alexandra Bao Yen Huynh (born 25 July 1994) is an Australian association football player, who currently plays for Newcastle Jets in the Australian A-League Women and the Australia national team.

== Club career ==
In October 2017, Huynh returned to Western Sydney Wanderers, after playing with Blacktown Spartans.

In October 2019, Huynh returned to the Australian W-League after playing in the US College system and in the NPL Women's Queensland, and signed with Western Sydney Wanderers.

In October 2020, Huynh joined Italian club Napoli, linking up with fellow Australians Isobel Dalton and Jacynta Galabadaarachchi.

In July 2021, Huynh joined Danish club Fortuna Hjørring.

In January 2022, Huynh returned to Australia, signing again with Western Sydney Wanderers until the end of the 2021–22 A-League Women season.

In August 2023, Huynh re-joined A-League Women club Newcastle Jets, where she retired at the end of the season.

== Personal life ==
Huynh is of Vietnamese descent.

Huynh is the cousin of Kassandra Huynh; the exercise physiologist for the Sydney Wanderers.

== Career statistics ==
=== Club ===
As of 2 September 2021

Club	Season	League			National Cup		Continental		Other		Total	
Club	Season	Division	Apps	Goals	Apps	Goals	Apps	Goals	Apps	Goals	Apps	Goals
WS Wanderers	2011–12	W-League	6	0	0	0	—		—		6	0
WS Wanderers	2012–13	W-League	11	0	0	0	—		—		11	0
WS Wanderers	2017–18	W-League	1	0	0	0	—		—		1	0
WS Wanderers	2019–20	W-League	12	0	0	0	—		—		12	0
WS Wanderers	Total		30	0	0	0	0	0	0	0	30	0
Napoli	2020–21	Serie A	14	0	1 (Note: Appearance(s) in Coppa Italia)	0	—		—		15	0
Fortuna Hjørring	2021–22	Elitedivisionen	3	0	2 (Note: Appearance(s) in Kvindepokalen)	0	0	0	0	0	5	0
Career total			47	0	4	0	0	0	0	0	50	0

=== International ===
As of 2 July 2021.

Australia
Year	Apps	Goals
2021	1	0
Total	1	0
