= Hannah Brewer =

Australian soccer player

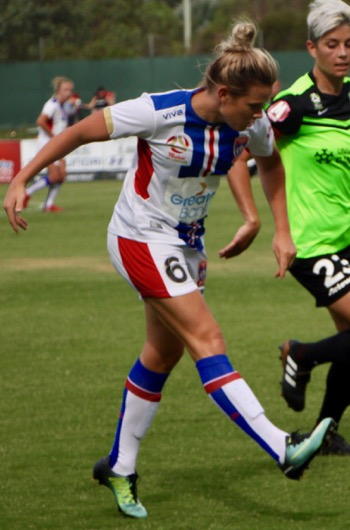

Personal information
- Full name: Hannah Elizabeth Brewer
- Date of birth: 16 April 1993 (age 33)
- Place of birth: Gosford, New South Wales, Australia
- Height: 1.65 m (5 ft 5 in)
- Position: Right back

Senior career*
Years	Team	Apps	(Gls)
2008–2014	Newcastle Jets	46	(0)
2013	Seattle Sounders	7	(0)
2014–2015	Melbourne Victory	13	(0)
2015	Valentine Phoenix		
2015	Melbourne City	1	(0)
2016–2017	Canberra United	13	(0)
2017–2022	Newcastle Jets	57	(1)

International career^{‡}
2008–2009	Australia U17	7	(1)
2014–	Australia	3	(0)
- * Club domestic league appearances and goals as of 20 November 2022 ‡ National team caps and goals as of 7 March 2018

Hannah Elizabeth Brewer (born 16 April 1993) is a soccer player who last played for Newcastle Jets in the Australian W-League.

== Playing career ==
=== Club career ===
In 2008, Brewer was a member of the Newcastle Jets team in the inaugural Australian W-League season. At the age of 15, she was the youngest member of the Jets team.

In April 2013, Brewer was signed to Seattle Sounders Women for the 2013 USL W-League season, eventually playing seven matches.

In 2014, Brewer moved to Melbourne to play for Melbourne Victory.

She sat out most of the 2015–16 W-League for family reasons, with just a single appearance for Melbourne City.

Brewer returned to regular football with Canberra United in 2016, playing 13 times in the W-League.

On 5 October 2017, Brewer returned to Newcastle Jets.

=== International career ===
Brewer made her international debut for Australia against Scotland at the 2014 Cyprus Women's Cup. She was called up again ahead of the 2018 Algarve Cup, where she played two matches.
