= Derek Asamoah =

Ghanaian footballer (born 1981)

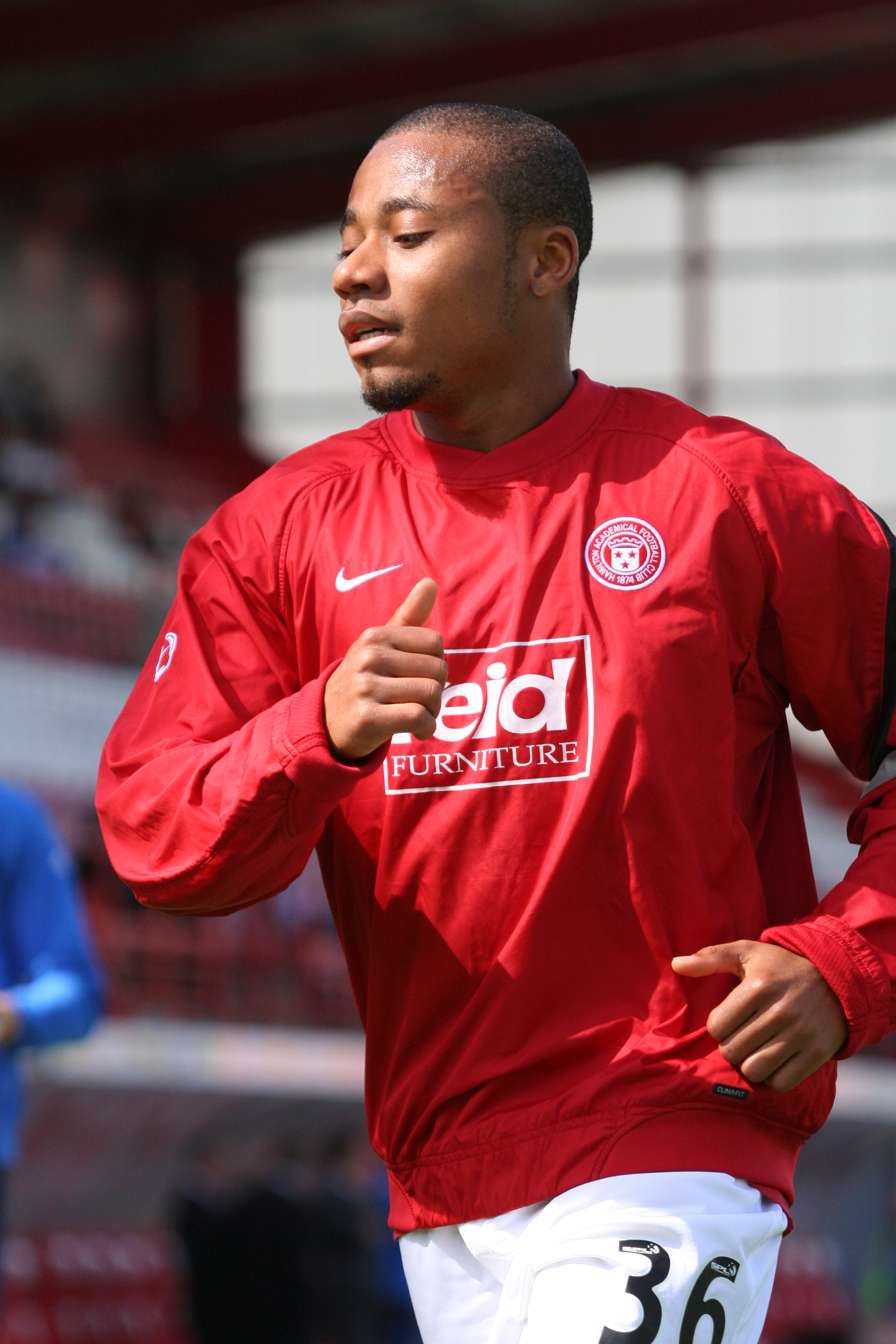
- Asamoah with Hamilton Academical in 2009

Personal information
- Full name: Derek Asamoah
- Date of birth: 1 May 1981 (age 45)
- Place of birth: Accra, Ghana
- Height: 1.70 m (5 ft 7 in)
- Positions: Winger; second striker

Team information
- Current team: Whitstable Town

Youth career
- 1998–1999: Protec Football Academy
- 1999–2000: Hampton & Richmond Borough
- 2000–2001: Slough Town

Senior career*
Years	Team	Apps	(Gls)
2000–2001	Slough Town	8	(3)
2001–2004	Northampton Town	112	(10)
2004–2005	Mansfield Town	30	(5)
2005–2006	Lincoln City	35	(2)
2006	→ Chester City (loan)	17	(8)
2006–2007	Shrewsbury Town	39	(10)
2007–2009	Nice	0	(0)
2009	Hamilton Academical	3	(0)
2009–2010	Lokomotiv Sofia	36	(13)
2011–2012	Pohang Steelers	56	(13)
2013	Daegu FC	33	(4)
2014–2016	Carlisle United	70	(10)
2016–2017	Carlisle United	8	(0)
2017	Guiseley	15	(1)
2017–2018	Haringey Borough	18	(6)
2020	Cheshunt	2	(0)
2021–2023	New Salamis	76	(53)
2023–2024	Brightlingsea Regent	11	(3)
2024	New Salamis	14	(4)
2024–2025	Haringey Borough	38	(9)
2025–2026	Sittingbourne	35	(13)
2026–	Whitstable Town	0	(0)

International career
2006–2011	Ghana	4	(1)
- * Club domestic league appearances and goals as of 19:13, 11 August 2026 (UTC)

Derek Asamoah (born 1 May 1981) is a Ghanaian professional footballer who plays as a forward for Isthmian League South East Division club Whitstable Town. He has previously played for clubs in France, Scotland, Bulgaria and South Korea.

== Club career ==
=== Early career ===
Asamoah learned his trade in the Protec Football Academy in North London. Whilst in the academy, he played for semi-professional side Hampton & Richmond Borough, before moving to Slough Town in 2001.

Asamoah then gained a trial at Northampton Town, in which he signed his first professional contract. After an impressive first season at Sixfields, he was offered a new improved contract but Asamoah turned it down in favor of a move to Mansfield Town. He had a difficult time at Mansfield Town and fell out with manager Carlton Palmer. He was transfer-listed and moved to Lincoln City.

Asamoah struggled to enjoy his spell at Lincoln City and scored very few goals, which led to boss Keith Alexander loaning him out to struggling Chester City.

Asamoah was in his most prolific season yet, almost using his own two feet saving Chester from the drop with nine goals in 18 matches and at one stage in the season, he had seven goals in four matches. Having rejected a permanent deal with Chester, Asamoah left and was released by Lincoln City.

In search of a new club, Asamoah trialled with both Doncaster Rovers and Scunthorpe United during July 2006, but on 3 August 2006, Shrewsbury Town announced that he had signed for them and turned down Scunthorpe United.

In 2006–07, Asamoah netted 10 times in the league as Shrewsbury Town qualified for the League Two play-offs in 7th place.

=== Nice ===
In August 2007, Asamoah moved to French Ligue 1 side OGC Nice in a controversial transfer, where he went AWOL from Shrewsbury Town in order to sign with the French club, with no clearance from Shrewsbury, the FA or the Football League. Asamoah moved for a figure of £50,000.

Following the transfer, Shrewsbury manager Gary Peters claimed Asamoah's conduct was that of a 'selfish player and a selfish person', and revealed Asamoah would have been sacked by Shrewsbury Town had his deal with Nice fallen through.

He never made a first-team appearance for the club. As a result of this, he had not played domestic football in over 18-months by end of January 2009, when he left Nice to begin training with Yeovil Town.

=== Hamilton Academical ===
On 2 April 2009, it was confirmed that he had a trial at Scottish side Hamilton Academical becoming the third Shrewsbury Town player to feature on their books after Colin Cramb and cult hero Victor Kasule. Asamoah made his debut for the Scottish side against Celtic, in a 6–0 thumping. At the end of the season Asamoah decided change would be best for him and left Hamilton for Bulgaria.

=== Lokomotiv Sofia ===
In July 2009, Asamoah joined Lokomotiv Sofia for two years, with the option for an additional one.

=== Pohang Steelers ===
In November 2010, Asamoah signed with South Korean side Pohang Steelers. His contract was for three years. On 5 March 2011, he made his official debut (as a starter) in the 1–1 home draw with Seongnam Ilhwa Chunma. Asamoah netted his first goal on 13 March 2011 – in the 1–0 away win over Chunnam Dragons. He established himself as an influential player for the side.

=== Daegu FC ===
Despite being one of Pohang Steeler's top goalscorers, Asamoah left them as a free agent and on 20 February 2013 signed with Daegu FC.

=== Carlisle United ===
Asamoah signed for League Two club Carlisle United on a short-term deal on 21 October 2014. He scored on his debut in a 4–3 home defeat to Burton Albion two days later. On 4 February, he signed a contract to keep him at Brunton Park until the end of the season. He described the club as a "sleeping giant" and hopes to help guide the Cumbrians back towards the top of the European game.

On 23 September 2015, in a Football League Cup tie against Liverpool, Asamoah scored the second goal of the match, with the match ending 1–1 before extra time. Carlisle United lost the tie eventually on penalties in a 3–2 result.

He was released June 2016, but in September he returned to the club for training. After scoring a hat trick in a reserve game, Asamoah re-signed for the club on 14 October 2016 on a short-term deal. After making 11 appearances in all competitions, Asamoah was released by Carlisle on 16 January 2017.

=== Guiseley ===
On 20 January 2017, Asamoah signed for National League side Guiseley until the end of the season. He left the club again in the summer 2017.

=== Cheshunt ===
In 2020 Asamoah joined Cheshunt where his son also plays.

=== Later career ===
Following a spell with New Salamis, he departed in October 2023 as the club's record goalscorer, joining Brighlingsea Regent; he described the move as 'an offer I can't refuse'. He made his league debut for the club in a 2–3 defeat at Wroxham on 28 October, scoring his first goals in the 4–1 win over Bowers & Pitsea on 16 December.

In September 2025, Asamoah joined Isthmian League South East Division club Sittingbourne.

In July 2026, Asamoah joined newly promoted Isthmian League South East Division club Whitstable Town.

== International career ==
In October 2006, Asamoah was included in the Ghana national football team for friendlies against Japan and South Korea, in which he made his international debut, he has made another three appearances for Ghana, looking to gain a place in the Milovan Rajevac squad for the 2010 African Cup of Nations and the World Cup. During the winter transfer window pause, the Ghana coach announced that having many talented footballers in his team, he would eye him to be included in the squad for the Cup, seeing as many Lokomotiv Sofia games as possible.

On 7 November 2011, Asamoah returned to the national team again for the first time since 2008. He was recalled to the national team for friendlies against Gabon and Sierra Leone by new head coach Goran Stevanović. On 15 November 2011, Asamoah scored his first international goal against Gabon in stoppage time to win the game 2–1 for Ghana.

== Career statistics ==
As of match played 25 April 2026

Club	Season	Division	League		FA Cup		League Cup		Other		Total	
Club	Season	Division	Apps	Goals	Apps	Goals	Apps	Goals	Apps	Goals	Apps	Goals
Slough Town	2000–01	Isthmian League Premier Division	8	3	0	0	0	0	0	0	8	3
Total			8	3	0	0	0	0	0		8	3
Northampton Town	2001–02	Division Two	39	3	1	0	1	0	2 (Note: Appearance(s) in Football League Trophy)	0	44	3
Northampton Town	2002–03	Division Two	42	4	3	1	1	0	2	1	48	6
Northampton Town	2003–04	Division Three	31	3	5	1	0	0	4 (Note: 2 Appearance(s) in Football League Trophy) (Note: 2 Appearance(s) in Division Three play-offs)	0	40	4
Total			112	10	9	2	2	0	8		131	13
Mansfield Town	2004–05	League Two	30	5	1	0	0	0	1	0	32	5
Total			30	5	1	0	0	0	1		32	5
Lincoln City	2004–05	League Two	10	0	0	0	0	0	3 (Note: 3 Appearance(s) in League Two play-offs)	0	13	0
Lincoln City	2005–06	League Two	25	2	2	0	2	0	1	0	30	2
Total			35	2	2	0	2	0	4		43	2
→ Chester City (loan)	2005–06	League Two	17	8	0	0	0	0	0	0	17	8
Total			17	8	0	0	0	0	0		17	8
Shrewsbury Town	2006–07	League Two	39	10	2	0	1	0	6 (Note: 4 Appearance(s) and 1 goal in Football League Trophy) (Note: 2 Appearance(s) in League Two play-offs)	1	48	11
Total			39	10	2	0	1	0	6		48	11
OGC Nice	2007–08	Ligue 1	0	0	0	0	0	0	0	0	0	0
OGC Nice	2008–09	Ligue 1	0	0	0	0	0	0	0	0	0	0
Total			0	0	0	0	0	0	0		0	0
Hamilton Academical	2008–09	SPL	3	0	0	0	0	0	0	0	3	0
Total			3	0	0	0	0	0	0		3	0
Lokomotiv Sofia	2009–10	A Group	22	6	1	0	0	0	0	0	23	6
Lokomotiv Sofia	2010–11	A Group	14	7	1	0	0	0	0	0	23	6
Total			36	13	2	0	0	0	0		38	13
Pohang Steelers	2011	K-League	26	7	4	1	4	0	1 (Note: 1 Appearance(s) in K-League Championship)	0	35	8
Pohang Steelers	2012	K-League	30	6	4	1	0	0	6 (Note: 6 Appearance(s) and 2 goals in AFC Champions League)	2	40	9
Total			56	13	8	2	4	0	7		75	17
Daegu	2013	K-League	33	4	0	0	0	0	0	0	33	4
Total			33	4	0	0	0	0	0		33	4
Carlisle United	2014–15	League Two	27	4	1	1	0	0	0	0	28	5
Carlisle United	2015–16	League Two	43	6	5	0	2	2	1	0	51	8
Carlisle United	2016–17	League Two	8	0	1	0	0	0	2	0	11	0
Total			78	10	7	1	2	2	3		90	13
Guiseley	2016–17	National League	15	1	0	0	0	0	0	0	15	1
Total			15	1	0	0	0	0	0		15	1
Haringey Borough	2017–18	Isthmian League Division One North	18	6	0	0	0	0	1 (Note: Appearance(s) in Isthmian League Division One North play-offs)	0	19	6
Cheshunt	2020–21	Isthmian League Premier Division	2	0	0	0	0	0	3 (Note: Appearance(s) in FA Trophy)	1	5	1
New Salamis	2021–22	SSML Premier Division	35	28	0	0	0	0	6 (Note: 4 Appearance(s) and 1 goal in FA Vase) (Note: 1 Appearance(s) in London Senior Cup) (Note: 1 Appearance(s) in Gladwish Challenge Trophy)	1	41	29
New Salamis	2022–23	Isthmian League Division One North	34	21	1	0	0	0	4 (Note: 3 Appearance(s) and 2 goals in FA Trophy) (Note: 1 Appearance(s) in Velocity Cup)	2	39	23
New Salamis	2023–24	Isthmian League Division One North	7	4	4	6	0	0	1 (Note: 1 Appearance(s) and 2 goals in FA Trophy)	2	12	12
Brightlingsea Regent	2023–24	Isthmian League Division One North	11	3	0	0	0	0	2 (Note: 2 Appearance(s) in Velocity Cup)	0	13	3
New Salamis	2023–24	Isthmian League Division One North	14	4	0	0	0	0	0	0	14	4
Haringey Borough	2024–25	Isthmian League Division One North	38	9	7	2	0	0	4 (Note: 2 Appearance(s) in FA Trophy) (Note: 1 Appearance(s) and 1 goal in Velocity Cup)	1	49	12
Haringey Borough	2021–22	SSML Premier Division	8	2	2	0	0	0	0	0	10	2
Sittingbourne	2025–26	Isthmian League Division One South East	35	13	0	0	0	0	0	0	35	13
Career total			664	169	45	13	11	2	50	11	770	195

=== International goals ===
#	Date	Venue	Opponent	Score	Result	Competition
1	15 November 2011	Saint-Leu-la-Forêt, France	Gabon	2 – 1	2–1	International Friendly

== Personal life ==
Asamoah is the cousin of former professional footballer Lloyd Owusu, who has now retired. Asamoah's son, Maleace is also a professional footballer and the pair played together in a match for Cheshunt.
