= Wolverhampton Wanderers F.C. league record by opponent =

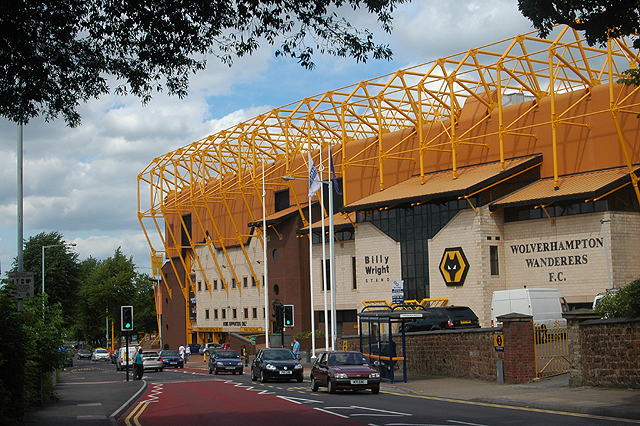
Molineux Stadium has been the home venue for Wolverhampton Wanderers since 1889.

Wolverhampton Wanderers Football Club is a professional association football club based in Wolverhampton, West Midlands. Founded in 1877 as St. Luke's, they adopted their current name in August 1879. Wolves began playing league football in 1888 when they were nominated to become one of the twelve founder members of the Football League. Wolves remained in the Football League for 115 years in different divisions, in this time the club were English football champions for three seasons. In 2003 they were promoted into the Premier League, which had replaced the Football League's First Division at the top of the English football league system in 1992. The team were relegated back into the Football League after one season in the Premier League. Their second promotion to the Premier League came in 2009 and this spell spanned three seasons. Between 2012 and 2018 the club were playing in the Football League until their third promotion to the Premier League at the end of the 2017–18 season. The Wolves remained in the Premier League through the 2025–26 season after which they were relegated to the Football League Championship for the 2026-27 season.

Wolverhampton Wanderers played their inaugural league fixture as part of the 1888–89 Football League on 8 September 1888 against Aston Villa. Since that game they have faced 112 different sides in league football with their most regular opponent having been West Bromwich Albion, against whom they have played on 148 occasions since their first meeting on 15 December 1888. They met their most recent different league opponent, Burton Albion, for the first time in the 2016–17 Football League Championship season. The club has won 64 of their 131 league matches against Burnley, which represents the most Wolves have won against any club. Wolves has drawn more matches with West Brom than with any other club; out of the 148 league matches between the two teams, 41 have finished without a winner. The side has lost more league games to Everton than to any other club, having been defeated by them 60 times in 134 encounters.

== Key ==
- The table includes results of matches played by Wolverhampton Wanderers in the English Football League and the Premier League. Wartime matches are regarded as unofficial and are excluded.
- For the sake of simplicity, present-day names are used throughout: for example, results against Small Heath, Woolwich Arsenal and The Wednesday are integrated into the records against Birmingham City, Arsenal and Sheffield Wednesday, respectively
- † Teams with this background and symbol in the "Club" column are competing in the 2023–24 Premier League alongside Wolves.
- ‡ Clubs with this background and symbol in the "Club" column are defunct
- Pld = matches played; W = matches won; D = matches drawn; L = matches lost; GF = goals for; GA = goals against; Win% = percentage of total matches won
- The columns headed "First" and "Last" contain the first and most recent seasons in which Wolves played league matches against each opponent

== All-time league record ==
Statistics correct as of matches played on 19 May 2024.

Wolverhampton Wanderers F.C. league record by opponent
| Club | Home | | | | Away | | | | Total | | | | | | Win% | First | Last | Note(s) |
| Club | Pld | W | D | L | Pld | W | D | L | Pld | W | D | L | GF | GA | Win% | First | Last | Note(s) |
|---|---|---|---|---|---|---|---|---|---|---|---|---|---|---|---|---|---|---|
| Accrington F.C. ‡ | 5 | 5 | 0 | 0 | 5 | 1 | 1 | 3 | 10 | 6 | 1 | 3 | 30 | 22 | 60.00 | 1888–89 | 1892–93 | |
| Accrington Stanley ‡ | 1 | 1 | 0 | 0 | 1 | 0 | 0 | 1 | 2 | 1 | 0 | 1 | 5 | 2 | 50.00 | 1923–24 | 1923–24 | |
| Aldershot | 3 | 2 | 0 | 1 | 3 | 2 | 0 | 1 | 6 | 4 | 0 | 2 | 8 | 5 | 66.67 | 1986–87 | 1988–89 | |
| Arsenal † | 55 | 20 | 11 | 24 | 55 | 9 | 16 | 30 | 110 | 29 | 27 | 54 | 160 | 215 | 26.36 | 1904–05 | 2023–24 | (Note: Record against Woolwich Arsenal included) |
| Ashington | 1 | 1 | 0 | 0 | 1 | 1 | 0 | 0 | 2 | 2 | 0 | 0 | 8 | 1 | 100.00 | 1923–24 | 1923–24 | |
| Aston Villa † | 59 | 26 | 14 | 19 | 59 | 15 | 15 | 29 | 118 | 41 | 29 | 48 | 175 | 206 | 34.75 | 1888–89 | 2023–24 | |
| Barnsley | 41 | 25 | 8 | 8 | 41 | 8 | 11 | 22 | 82 | 33 | 19 | 30 | 134 | 119 | 40.24 | 1906–07 | 2017–18 | |
| Barrow | 1 | 1 | 0 | 0 | 1 | 0 | 1 | 0 | 2 | 1 | 1 | 0 | 5 | 2 | 50.00 | 1923–24 | 1923–24 | |
| Birmingham City | 65 | 40 | 10 | 15 | 65 | 22 | 20 | 23 | 130 | 62 | 30 | 38 | 206 | 154 | 47.69 | 1894–95 | 2017–18 | (Note: Record against Small Heath included; record against Birmingham included) |
| Blackburn Rovers | 48 | 25 | 13 | 10 | 48 | 12 | 10 | 26 | 96 | 37 | 23 | 36 | 167 | 168 | 38.54 | 1888–89 | 2016–17 | |
| Blackpool | 50 | 30 | 9 | 11 | 50 | 17 | 10 | 23 | 100 | 47 | 19 | 34 | 162 | 143 | 47.00 | 1906–07 | 2014–15 | |
| Bolton Wanderers | 63 | 37 | 12 | 14 | 63 | 15 | 13 | 35 | 126 | 52 | 25 | 49 | 226 | 189 | 41.27 | 1888–89 | 2017–18 | |
| Bournemouth † | 7 | 3 | 0 | 4 | 7 | 2 | 3 | 2 | 14 | 5 | 3 | 6 | 16 | 17 | 35.71 | 1985–86 | 2023–24 | |
| Bradford City | 16 | 9 | 4 | 3 | 16 | 5 | 5 | 6 | 32 | 14 | 9 | 9 | 60 | 45 | 43.75 | 1906–07 | 2013–14 | |
| Bradford Park Avenue | 12 | 5 | 6 | 1 | 12 | 3 | 3 | 6 | 24 | 8 | 9 | 7 | 35 | 30 | 33.33 | 1908–09 | 1931–32 | |
| Brentford † | 16 | 9 | 1 | 6 | 16 | 6 | 3 | 7 | 32 | 15 | 4 | 13 | 51 | 50 | 46.88 | 1935–36 | 2023–24 | |
| Brighton & Hove Albion † | 20 | 3 | 7 | 10 | 20 | 3 | 8 | 9 | 40 | 6 | 15 | 19 | 36 | 71 | 15.00 | 1979–80 | 2023–24 | |
| Bristol City | 32 | 19 | 11 | 2 | 32 | 14 | 5 | 13 | 64 | 33 | 16 | 15 | 111 | 70 | 51.56 | 1911–12 | 2017–18 | |
| Bristol Rovers | 6 | 2 | 1 | 3 | 6 | 1 | 5 | 0 | 12 | 3 | 6 | 3 | 21 | 15 | 25.00 | 1976–77 | 1992–93 | |
| Burnley † | 66 | 41 | 12 | 13 | 66 | 23 | 17 | 26 | 132 | 64 | 29 | 39 | 235 | 163 | 48.48 | 1888–89 | 2023–24 | |
| Burton Albion | 2 | 1 | 1 | 0 | 2 | 1 | 0 | 1 | 4 | 2 | 1 | 1 | 9 | 4 | 50.00 | 2016–17 | 2017–18 | |
| Burton United ‡ | 1 | 1 | 0 | 0 | 1 | 0 | 0 | 1 | 2 | 1 | 0 | 1 | 4 | 4 | 50.00 | 1906–07 | 1906–07 | |
| Bury | 27 | 17 | 8 | 2 | 27 | 5 | 2 | 20 | 54 | 22 | 10 | 22 | 82 | 69 | 40.74 | 1895–96 | 1998–99 | |
| Cambridge United | 5 | 2 | 1 | 2 | 5 | 0 | 3 | 2 | 10 | 2 | 4 | 4 | 12 | 12 | 20.00 | 1982–83 | 1992–93 | |
| Cardiff City | 29 | 16 | 4 | 9 | 29 | 11 | 9 | 9 | 58 | 27 | 13 | 18 | 113 | 77 | 46.55 | 1920–21 | 2018–19 | |
| Carlisle United | 8 | 6 | 1 | 1 | 8 | 4 | 1 | 3 | 16 | 10 | 2 | 4 | 29 | 13 | 62.50 | 1965–66 | 2013–14 | |
| Charlton Athletic | 37 | 23 | 9 | 5 | 37 | 15 | 7 | 15 | 74 | 38 | 16 | 20 | 134 | 93 | 51.35 | 1929–30 | 2015–16 | |
| Chelsea † | 56 | 26 | 13 | 17 | 56 | 16 | 17 | 23 | 112 | 42 | 30 | 40 | 188 | 189 | 37.50 | 1906–07 | 2023–24 | |
| Chester City ‡ | 1 | 1 | 0 | 0 | 1 | 0 | 1 | 0 | 2 | 1 | 1 | 0 | 4 | 2 | 50.00 | 1988–89 | 1988–89 | |
| Chesterfield | 7 | 6 | 1 | 0 | 7 | 2 | 2 | 3 | 14 | 8 | 3 | 3 | 23 | 12 | 57.14 | 1906–07 | 1988–89 | (Note: Record against Chesterfield Town included) |
| Colchester United | 5 | 5 | 0 | 0 | 5 | 3 | 0 | 2 | 10 | 8 | 0 | 2 | 16 | 7 | 80.00 | 1986–87 | 2013–14 | |
| Coventry City | 30 | 12 | 8 | 10 | 30 | 7 | 6 | 17 | 60 | 19 | 14 | 27 | 60 | 80 | 31.67 | 1919–20 | 2013–14 | |
| Crawley Town | 1 | 1 | 0 | 0 | 1 | 0 | 0 | 1 | 2 | 1 | 0 | 1 | 3 | 3 | 50.00 | 2013–14 | 2013–14 | |
| Crewe Alexandra | 11 | 5 | 4 | 2 | 11 | 6 | 3 | 2 | 22 | 11 | 7 | 4 | 34 | 14 | 50.00 | 1923–24 | 2013–14 | |
| Crystal Palace † | 32 | 16 | 6 | 10 | 32 | 9 | 10 | 13 | 64 | 25 | 16 | 23 | 79 | 82 | 39.06 | 1921–22 | 2023–24 | |
| Darlington ‡ | 5 | 5 | 0 | 0 | 5 | 1 | 2 | 2 | 10 | 6 | 2 | 2 | 21 | 16 | 60.00 | 1923–24 | 1987–88 | |
| Darwen ‡ | 2 | 1 | 1 | 0 | 2 | 1 | 0 | 1 | 4 | 2 | 1 | 1 | 9 | 7 | 50.00 | 1891–92 | 1893–94 | |
| Derby County | 71 | 32 | 18 | 21 | 71 | 21 | 12 | 38 | 142 | 53 | 30 | 59 | 246 | 249 | 37.32 | 1888–89 | 2017–18 | |
| Doncaster Rovers | 3 | 2 | 0 | 1 | 3 | 3 | 0 | 0 | 6 | 5 | 0 | 1 | 7 | 2 | 83.33 | 1923–24 | 2008–09 | |
| Durham City | 1 | 1 | 0 | 0 | 1 | 1 | 0 | 0 | 2 | 2 | 0 | 0 | 5 | 3 | 100.00 | 1923–24 | 1923–24 | |
| Everton † | 67 | 33 | 13 | 21 | 67 | 15 | 13 | 39 | 134 | 48 | 26 | 60 | 189 | 217 | 35.82 | 1888–89 | 2023–24 | |
| Exeter City | 2 | 1 | 1 | 0 | 2 | 2 | 0 | 0 | 4 | 3 | 1 | 0 | 12 | 5 | 75.00 | 1986–87 | 1987–88 | |
| Fulham † | 44 | 26 | 13 | 5 | 44 | 15 | 11 | 18 | 88 | 41 | 24 | 23 | 136 | 108 | 46.59 | 1907–08 | 2023–24 | |
| Gainsborough Trinity | 6 | 4 | 2 | 0 | 6 | 3 | 0 | 3 | 12 | 7 | 2 | 3 | 14 | 5 | 58.33 | 1906–07 | 1911–12 | |
| Gillingham | 7 | 4 | 2 | 1 | 7 | 3 | 0 | 4 | 14 | 7 | 2 | 5 | 32 | 15 | 50.00 | 1985–86 | 2013–14 | |
| Glossop North End | 10 | 8 | 2 | 0 | 10 | 5 | 1 | 4 | 20 | 13 | 3 | 4 | 43 | 20 | 65.00 | 1899–1900 | 1914–15 | (Note: Record against Glossop included) |
| Grimsby Town | 35 | 23 | 5 | 7 | 35 | 11 | 7 | 17 | 70 | 34 | 12 | 24 | 126 | 77 | 48.57 | 1901–02 | 2002–03 | |
| Halifax Town ‡ | 3 | 1 | 0 | 2 | 3 | 1 | 1 | 1 | 6 | 2 | 1 | 3 | 12 | 10 | 33.33 | 1923–24 | 1987–88 | |
| Hartlepool United | 3 | 3 | 0 | 0 | 3 | 2 | 1 | 0 | 6 | 5 | 1 | 0 | 10 | 2 | 83.33 | 1923–24 | 1987–88 | |
| Hereford United ‡ | 3 | 3 | 0 | 0 | 3 | 2 | 0 | 1 | 6 | 5 | 0 | 1 | 13 | 5 | 83.33 | 1976–77 | 1987–88 | |
| Huddersfield Town | 39 | 20 | 8 | 11 | 39 | 11 | 4 | 24 | 78 | 31 | 12 | 35 | 133 | 118 | 39.74 | 1910–11 | 2018–19 | |
| Hull City | 30 | 14 | 8 | 8 | 30 | 8 | 4 | 18 | 60 | 22 | 12 | 26 | 89 | 104 | 36.67 | 1906–07 | 2017–18 | |
| Ipswich Town | 38 | 16 | 16 | 6 | 38 | 10 | 6 | 22 | 76 | 26 | 22 | 28 | 84 | 94 | 34.21 | 1961–62 | 2017–18 | |
| Leeds City ‡ | 10 | 7 | 1 | 2 | 10 | 1 | 3 | 6 | 20 | 8 | 4 | 8 | 40 | 37 | 40.00 | 1906–07 | 1919–20 | |
| Leeds United | 47 | 23 | 11 | 13 | 47 | 11 | 10 | 26 | 94 | 34 | 21 | 39 | 122 | 127 | 36.17 | 1920–21 | 2022–23 | |
| Leicester City | 56 | 26 | 18 | 12 | 56 | 12 | 16 | 28 | 112 | 38 | 34 | 40 | 150 | 144 | 33.93 | 1906–07 | 2022–23 | (Note: Record against Leicester Fosse included) |
| Leyton Orient | 24 | 15 | 3 | 6 | 24 | 7 | 6 | 11 | 48 | 22 | 9 | 17 | 79 | 59 | 45.83 | 1906–07 | 2013–14 | (Note: Record against Clapton Orient included; record against Orient included) |
| Lincoln City | 11 | 10 | 1 | 0 | 11 | 3 | 2 | 6 | 22 | 13 | 3 | 6 | 45 | 24 | 59.09 | 1906–07 | 1986–87 | |
| Liverpool † | 53 | 22 | 10 | 21 | 53 | 9 | 7 | 37 | 106 | 31 | 17 | 58 | 116 | 167 | 29.25 | 1894–95 | 2023–24 | |
| Luton Town † | 15 | 8 | 2 | 5 | 15 | 5 | 4 | 6 | 30 | 13 | 6 | 11 | 55 | 51 | 43.33 | 1955–56 | 2023–24 | |
| Manchester City † | 60 | 32 | 13 | 15 | 59 | 13 | 11 | 35 | 119 | 45 | 24 | 50 | 219 | 234 | 37.82 | 1899–1900 | 2023–24 | |
| Manchester United † | 50 | 24 | 10 | 16 | 51 | 10 | 7 | 34 | 101 | 34 | 17 | 50 | 140 | 172 | 33.66 | 1892–93 | 2023–24 | (Note: Record against Newton Heath included) |
| Mansfield Town | 1 | 1 | 0 | 0 | 1 | 0 | 0 | 1 | 2 | 1 | 0 | 1 | 7 | 5 | 50.00 | 1988–89 | 1988–89 | |
| Middlesbrough | 44 | 21 | 7 | 16 | 44 | 5 | 12 | 27 | 88 | 26 | 19 | 43 | 123 | 142 | 29.55 | 1902–03 | 2017–18 | |
| Millwall | 19 | 11 | 4 | 4 | 19 | 5 | 7 | 7 | 38 | 16 | 11 | 11 | 60 | 40 | 42.11 | 1928–29 | 2017–18 | |
| Milton Keynes Dons | 2 | 0 | 1 | 1 | 2 | 2 | 0 | 0 | 4 | 2 | 1 | 1 | 3 | 3 | 50.00 | 2013–14 | 2015–16 | |
| New Brighton ‡ | 1 | 1 | 0 | 0 | 1 | 1 | 0 | 0 | 2 | 2 | 0 | 0 | 6 | 1 | 100.00 | 1923–24 | 1923–24 | |
| Newcastle United † | 48 | 26 | 15 | 7 | 48 | 10 | 12 | 26 | 96 | 36 | 27 | 33 | 148 | 153 | 37.50 | 1898–99 | 2023–24 | |
| Newport County | 2 | 1 | 0 | 1 | 2 | 1 | 0 | 1 | 4 | 2 | 0 | 2 | 7 | 7 | 50.00 | 1985–86 | 1987–88 | |
| Northampton Town | 3 | 2 | 1 | 0 | 3 | 1 | 0 | 2 | 6 | 3 | 1 | 2 | 11 | 8 | 50.00 | 1966–67 | 1988–89 | |
| Norwich City | 28 | 18 | 8 | 2 | 28 | 10 | 8 | 10 | 56 | 28 | 16 | 12 | 92 | 56 | 50.00 | 1965–66 | 2021–22 | |
| Nottingham Forest † | 64 | 43 | 11 | 10 | 64 | 15 | 18 | 31 | 128 | 58 | 29 | 41 | 214 | 185 | 45.31 | 1892–93 | 2023–24 | |
| Notts County | 34 | 21 | 8 | 5 | 34 | 8 | 11 | 15 | 68 | 29 | 19 | 20 | 110 | 103 | 42.65 | 1888–89 | 2013–14 | |
| Oldham Athletic | 20 | 10 | 6 | 4 | 20 | 5 | 2 | 13 | 40 | 15 | 8 | 17 | 58 | 61 | 37.50 | 1907–08 | 2013–14 | |
| Oxford United | 9 | 5 | 2 | 2 | 9 | 1 | 4 | 4 | 18 | 6 | 6 | 6 | 23 | 25 | 33.33 | 1984–85 | 1998–99 | |
| Peterborough United | 6 | 2 | 1 | 3 | 6 | 4 | 1 | 1 | 12 | 6 | 2 | 4 | 15 | 15 | 50.00 | 1986–87 | 2013–14 | |
| Plymouth Argyle | 14 | 8 | 4 | 2 | 14 | 3 | 6 | 5 | 28 | 11 | 10 | 7 | 38 | 33 | 39.29 | 1930–31 | 2008–09 | |
| Port Vale | 22 | 14 | 4 | 4 | 22 | 12 | 6 | 4 | 44 | 26 | 10 | 8 | 90 | 46 | 59.09 | 1906–07 | 2013–14 | (Note: Record against Burslem Port Vale included) |
| Portsmouth | 42 | 22 | 14 | 6 | 42 | 12 | 10 | 20 | 84 | 34 | 24 | 26 | 143 | 106 | 40.48 | 1924–25 | 2009–10 | |
| Preston North End | 58 | 32 | 11 | 15 | 58 | 14 | 16 | 28 | 116 | 46 | 27 | 43 | 197 | 188 | 39.66 | 1888–89 | 2017–18 | |
| Queens Park Rangers | 22 | 11 | 4 | 7 | 22 | 6 | 10 | 6 | 44 | 17 | 14 | 13 | 64 | 61 | 38.64 | 1968–69 | 2017–18 | |
| Reading | 19 | 11 | 2 | 6 | 19 | 5 | 5 | 9 | 38 | 16 | 7 | 15 | 51 | 51 | 42.11 | 1926–27 | 2017–18 | |
| Rochdale | 3 | 1 | 2 | 0 | 3 | 2 | 1 | 0 | 6 | 3 | 3 | 0 | 6 | 0 | 50.00 | 1923–24 | 1987–88 | |
| Rotherham County ‡ | 5 | 4 | 0 | 1 | 5 | 0 | 1 | 4 | 10 | 4 | 1 | 5 | 15 | 12 | 40.00 | 1919–20 | 1923–24 | |
| Rotherham United | 11 | 8 | 3 | 0 | 11 | 4 | 5 | 2 | 22 | 12 | 8 | 2 | 44 | 22 | 54.55 | 1965–66 | 2016–17 | |
| Scarborough ‡ | 1 | 0 | 1 | 0 | 1 | 0 | 1 | 0 | 2 | 0 | 2 | 0 | 2 | 2 | 0.00 | 1987–88 | 1987–88 | |
| Scunthorpe United | 3 | 3 | 0 | 0 | 3 | 3 | 0 | 0 | 6 | 6 | 0 | 0 | 12 | 2 | 100.00 | 1986–87 | 2007–08 | |
| Sheffield United † | 53 | 25 | 18 | 10 | 53 | 10 | 16 | 27 | 106 | 35 | 34 | 37 | 171 | 161 | 33.02 | 1893–94 | 2023–24 | |
| Sheffield Wednesday | 52 | 32 | 13 | 7 | 52 | 13 | 16 | 23 | 104 | 45 | 29 | 30 | 168 | 149 | 43.27 | 1892–93 | 2017–18 | (Note: Record against The Wednesday included) |
| Shrewsbury Town | 3 | 0 | 2 | 1 | 3 | 2 | 0 | 1 | 6 | 2 | 2 | 2 | 6 | 5 | 33.33 | 1982–83 | 2013–14 | |
| South Shields ‡ | 8 | 7 | 1 | 0 | 8 | 3 | 4 | 1 | 16 | 10 | 5 | 1 | 28 | 15 | 62.50 | 1919–20 | 1927–28 | |
| Southampton | 33 | 15 | 12 | 6 | 33 | 10 | 5 | 18 | 66 | 25 | 17 | 24 | 94 | 103 | 37.88 | 1922–23 | 2022–23 | |
| Southend United | 9 | 6 | 1 | 2 | 9 | 3 | 3 | 3 | 18 | 9 | 4 | 5 | 31 | 16 | 50.00 | 1986–87 | 2006–07 | |
| Southport | 1 | 1 | 0 | 0 | 1 | 0 | 1 | 0 | 2 | 1 | 1 | 0 | 2 | 1 | 50.00 | 1923–24 | 1923–24 | |
| Stevenage | 1 | 1 | 0 | 0 | 1 | 0 | 1 | 0 | 2 | 1 | 1 | 0 | 2 | 0 | 50.00 | 2013–14 | 2013–14 | |
| Stockport County | 21 | 12 | 7 | 2 | 21 | 7 | 7 | 7 | 42 | 19 | 14 | 9 | 75 | 50 | 45.24 | 1906–07 | 2001–02 | |
| Stoke City | 70 | 37 | 19 | 14 | 70 | 21 | 14 | 35 | 140 | 58 | 33 | 49 | 217 | 195 | 41.43 | 1888–89 | 2011–12 | (Note: Record against Stoke included) |
| Sunderland | 56 | 28 | 13 | 15 | 56 | 11 | 14 | 31 | 112 | 39 | 27 | 46 | 157 | 194 | 34.82 | 1890–91 | 2017–18 | |
| Swansea City | 14 | 6 | 5 | 3 | 14 | 4 | 5 | 5 | 28 | 10 | 10 | 8 | 49 | 47 | 35.71 | 1925–26 | 2011–12 | (Note: Record against Swansea Town included) |
| Swindon Town | 10 | 6 | 3 | 1 | 10 | 3 | 1 | 6 | 20 | 9 | 4 | 7 | 28 | 24 | 45.00 | 1989–90 | 2013–14 | |
| Torquay United | 2 | 1 | 0 | 1 | 2 | 1 | 1 | 0 | 4 | 2 | 1 | 1 | 4 | 3 | 50.00 | 1986–87 | 1987–88 | |
| Tottenham Hotspur † | 47 | 23 | 9 | 15 | 47 | 9 | 8 | 30 | 94 | 32 | 17 | 45 | 151 | 177 | 34.04 | 1908–09 | 2023–24 | |
| Tranmere Rovers | 14 | 11 | 1 | 2 | 14 | 4 | 5 | 5 | 28 | 15 | 6 | 7 | 45 | 30 | 53.57 | 1923–24 | 2013–14 | |
| Walsall | 6 | 2 | 2 | 2 | 6 | 3 | 2 | 1 | 12 | 5 | 4 | 3 | 17 | 8 | 41.67 | 1923–24 | 2013–14 | |
| Watford | 21 | 7 | 11 | 3 | 21 | 6 | 5 | 10 | 42 | 13 | 16 | 13 | 54 | 52 | 30.95 | 1983–84 | 2021–22 | |
| West Bromwich Albion | 74 | 35 | 17 | 22 | 74 | 17 | 24 | 33 | 148 | 52 | 41 | 55 | 230 | 231 | 35.14 | 1888–89 | 2020–21 | |
| West Ham United † | 35 | 18 | 7 | 10 | 35 | 6 | 7 | 22 | 70 | 24 | 14 | 32 | 86 | 113 | 34.29 | 1919–20 | 2023–24 | |
| Wigan Athletic | 8 | 2 | 3 | 3 | 8 | 2 | 1 | 5 | 16 | 4 | 4 | 8 | 22 | 29 | 25.00 | 1985–86 | 2016–17 | |
| Wigan Borough ‡ | 1 | 0 | 1 | 0 | 1 | 0 | 1 | 0 | 2 | 0 | 2 | 0 | 4 | 4 | 0.00 | 1923–24 | 1923–24 | |
| Wimbledon ‡ | 4 | 1 | 2 | 1 | 4 | 1 | 2 | 1 | 8 | 2 | 4 | 2 | 10 | 10 | 25.00 | 1984–85 | 2002–03 | |
| Wrexham | 3 | 1 | 0 | 2 | 3 | 0 | 2 | 1 | 6 | 1 | 2 | 3 | 7 | 11 | 16.67 | 1923–24 | 1987–88 | |
| York City | 1 | 1 | 0 | 0 | 1 | 0 | 0 | 1 | 2 | 1 | 0 | 1 | 4 | 4 | 50.00 | 1985–86 | 1985–86 | |
