= 2015–16 Football League =

117th season of the Football League

The Football League
- Season: 2015–16
- Champions: Burnley
- Promoted: Burnley; Middlesbrough; Hull City
- Relegated: Dagenham & Redbridge; York City
- New Clubs in League: Barnet; Bristol Rovers

The 2015–16 Football League (known as the Sky Bet Football League for sponsorship reasons) was the 117th season of The Football League. It began on 7 August 2015 and concluded on 30 May 2016, with the League Two play-off final at Wembley Stadium. The Football League was contested through three Divisions: the Championship, League One and League Two. The winners of the Championship, Burnley, and runners-up, Middlesbrough, were automatically promoted to the Premier League and on 28 May 2016 were joined by the winners of the Championship play-off, Hull City. The bottom two teams in League Two, Dagenham & Redbridge and York City, were relegated to the National League.

It was the last season that the league would be known simply as The Football League; from the 2016–17 season onwards, it would be known as the English Football League.

== Promotion and relegation ==
=== From the Premier League ===
Relegated to the Championship

- Hull City
- Burnley
- Queens Park Rangers

=== From the Championship ===
Promoted to the Premier League

- Bournemouth
- Watford
- Norwich City

Relegated to League One

- Millwall
- Wigan Athletic
- Blackpool

=== From League One ===
Promoted to the Championship

- Bristol City
- Milton Keynes Dons
- Preston North End

Relegated to League Two

- Notts County
- Crawley Town
- Leyton Orient
- Yeovil Town

=== From League Two ===
Promoted to League One

- Burton Albion
- Shrewsbury Town
- Bury
- Southend United

Relegated to the National League

- Cheltenham Town
- Tranmere Rovers

=== From the Conference National ===
- Barnet
- Bristol Rovers

== Championship ==
=== Table ===
Pos	Team	Pld	W	D	L	GF	GA	GD	Pts	Promotion, qualification or relegation
1	Burnley (C, P)	46	26	15	5	72	35	+37	93	Promotion to the Premier League
2	Middlesbrough (P)	46	26	11	9	63	31	+32	89	Promotion to the Premier League
3	Brighton & Hove Albion	46	24	17	5	72	42	+30	89	Qualification for the Championship play-offs (Note: Four teams play for one spot and promotion to the Premier League.)
4	Hull City (O, P)	46	24	11	11	69	35	+34	83	Qualification for the Championship play-offs
5	Derby County	46	21	15	10	66	43	+23	78	Qualification for the Championship play-offs
6	Sheffield Wednesday	46	19	17	10	66	45	+21	74	Qualification for the Championship play-offs
7	Ipswich Town	46	18	15	13	53	51	+2	69	
8	Cardiff City	46	17	17	12	56	51	+5	68	
9	Brentford	46	19	8	19	72	67	+5	65	
10	Birmingham City	46	16	15	15	53	49	+4	63	
11	Preston North End	46	15	17	14	45	45	0	62	
12	Queens Park Rangers	46	14	18	14	54	54	0	60	
13	Leeds United	46	14	17	15	50	58	−8	59	
14	Wolverhampton Wanderers	46	14	16	16	53	58	−5	58	
15	Blackburn Rovers	46	13	16	17	46	46	0	55	
16	Nottingham Forest	46	13	16	17	43	47	−4	55	
17	Reading	46	13	13	20	52	59	−7	52	
18	Bristol City	46	13	13	20	54	71	−17	52	
19	Huddersfield Town	46	13	12	21	59	70	−11	51	
20	Fulham	46	12	15	19	66	79	−13	51	
21	Rotherham United	46	13	10	23	53	71	−18	49	
22	Charlton Athletic (R)	46	9	13	24	40	80	−40	40	Relegation to EFL League One
23	Milton Keynes Dons (R)	46	9	12	25	39	69	−30	39	Relegation to EFL League One
24	Bolton Wanderers (R)	46	5	15	26	41	81	−40	30	Relegation to EFL League One

Source: BBC Sport
Rules for classification: 1) Points; 2) Goal difference; 3) Number of goals scored
(C) Champions; (O) Play-off winners; (P) Promoted; (R) Relegated

=== Play-offs ===
Semi-finals
3	Brighton & Hove Albion	0	1	1
6	Sheffield Wednesday	2	1	3
4	Hull City	3	0	3
5	Derby County	0	2	2

Final
6	Sheffield Wednesday	0
4	Hull City	1

The four teams that finished from third to sixth played off, with the winning team, Hull City, gaining the final promotion spot to the Premier League.

In the play-off semi-finals the third placed team played the sixth placed team and the fourth placed team played the fifth placed team. The team that finished in the higher league position played away in the first leg and played at home in the second leg. If the aggregate score was level after both legs, then extra time would be played. If the scores were still level, a penalty shoot-out decided the winner. The away goals rule did apply in the semi-finals. The semi-finals were held on 13–14 and 16–17 May.

The winners from the two semi-finals, Hull City and Sheffield Wednesday, played at Wembley Stadium on 28 May 2016 in the play-off final, where Hull City won 1–0. The game is known as the richest game in football as the winning club is guaranteed significantly increased payments e.g. in the 2016-17 season the minimum payment for participating in the Premier League was £95 million. Due to a new TV rights deal, the average payment for a newly promoted club stood at around £100 million.

=== Results ===
Home \ Away	BIR	BLB	BOL	BRE	B&HA	BRI	BUR	CAR	CHA	DER	FUL	HUD	HUL	IPS	LEE	MID	MKD	NOT	PNE	QPR	REA	ROT	SHW	WOL
Birmingham City		0–0	1–0	2–1	1–2	4–2	1–2	1–0	0–1	1–1	1–1	0–2	1–0	3–0	1–2	2–2	1–0	0–1	2–2	2–1	2–1	0–2	1–2	0–2
Blackburn Rovers	2–0		0–0	1–1	0–1	2–2	0–1	1–1	3–0	0–0	3–0	0–2	0–2	2–0	1–2	2–1	3–2	0–0	1–2	1–1	3–1	1–0	2–2	1–2
Bolton Wanderers	0–1	1–0		1–1	2–2	0–0	1–2	2–3	0–0	0–0	2–2	0–2	1–0	2–2	1–1	1–2	3–1	1–1	1–2	1–1	0–1	2–1	0–0	2–1
Brentford	0–2	0–1	3–1		0–0	1–1	1–3	2–1	1–2	1–3	3–0	4–2	0–2	2–2	1–1	0–1	2–0	2–1	2–1	1–0	1–3	2–1	1–2	3–0
Brighton & Hove Albion	2–1	1–0	3–2	3–0		2–1	2–2	1–1	3–2	1–1	5–0	2–1	1–0	0–1	4–0	0–3	2–1	1–0	0–0	4–0	1–0	2–1	0–0	0–1
Bristol City	0–0	0–2	6–0	2–4	0–4		1–2	0–2	1–1	2–3	1–4	4–0	1–1	2–1	2–2	1–0	1–1	2–0	1–2	1–1	0–2	1–1	4–1	1–0
Burnley	2–2	1–0	2–0	1–0	1–1	4–0		0–0	4–0	4–1	3–1	2–1	1–0	0–0	1–0	1–1	2–1	1–0	0–2	1–0	1–2	2–0	3–1	1–1
Cardiff City	1–1	1–0	2–1	3–2	4–1	0–0	2–2		2–1	2–1	1–1	2–0	0–2	1–0	0–2	1–0	0–0	1–1	2–1	0–0	2–0	2–2	2–2	2–0
Charlton Athletic	2–1	1–1	2–2	0–3	1–3	0–1	0–3	0–0		0–1	2–2	1–2	2–1	0–3	0–0	2–0	0–0	1–1	0–3	2–0	3–4	1–1	3–1	0–2
Derby County	0–3	1–0	4–1	2–0	2–2	4–0	0–0	2–0	1–1		2–0	2–0	4–0	0–1	1–2	1–1	0–1	1–0	0–0	1–0	1–1	3–0	1–1	4–2
Fulham	2–5	2–1	1–0	2–2	1–2	1–2	2–3	2–1	3–0	1–1		1–1	0–1	1–2	1–1	0–2	2–1	1–3	1–1	4–0	4–2	4–1	0–1	0–3
Huddersfield Town	1–1	1–1	4–1	1–5	1–1	1–2	1–3	2–3	5–0	1–2	1–1		2–2	0–1	0–3	0–2	2–0	1–1	3–1	0–1	3–1	2–0	0–1	1–0
Hull City	2–0	1–1	1–0	2–0	0–0	4–0	3–0	2–0	6–0	0–2	2–1	2–0		3–0	2–2	3–0	1–1	1–1	2–0	1–1	2–1	5–1	0–0	2–1
Ipswich Town	1–1	2–0	2–0	1–3	2–3	2–2	2–0	0–0	0–0	0–1	1–1	0–0	0–1		2–1	0–2	3–2	1–0	1–1	2–1	2–1	0–1	2–1	2–2
Leeds United	0–2	0–2	2–1	1–1	1–2	1–0	1–1	1–0	1–2	2–2	1–1	1–4	2–1	0–1		0–0	1–1	0–1	1–0	1–1	3–2	0–1	1–1	2–1
Middlesbrough	0–0	1–1	3–0	3–1	1–1	0–1	1–0	3–1	3–0	2–0	0–0	3–0	1–0	0–0	3–0		2–0	0–1	1–0	1–0	2–1	1–0	1–0	2–1
Milton Keynes Dons	0–2	3–0	1–0	1–4	1–2	0–2	0–5	2–1	1–0	1–3	1–1	1–1	0–2	0–1	1–2	1–1		1–2	0–1	2–0	1–0	0–4	2–1	1–2
Nottingham Forest	1–1	1–1	3–0	0–3	1–2	1–2	1–1	1–2	0–0	1–0	3–0	0–2	0–1	1–1	1–1	1–2	2–1		1–0	0–0	3–1	2–1	0–3	1–1
Preston North End	1–1	1–2	0–0	1–3	0–0	1–1	0–1	0–0	2–1	1–2	1–2	2–1	1–0	1–2	1–1	0–0	1–1	1–0		1–1	1–0	2–1	1–0	1–1
Queens Park Rangers	2–0	2–2	4–3	3–0	2–2	1–0	0–0	2–2	2–1	2–0	1–3	1–1	1–2	1–0	1–0	2–3	3–0	1–2	0–0		1–1	4–2	0–0	1–1
Reading	0–2	1–0	2–1	1–2	1–1	1–0	0–0	1–1	1–0	0–1	2–2	2–2	1–2	5–1	0–0	2–0	0–0	2–1	1–2	0–1		1–0	1–1	0–0
Rotherham United	0–0	0–1	4–0	2–1	2–0	3–0	1–2	2–1	1–4	3–3	1–3	1–1	2–0	2–5	2–1	1–0	1–4	0–0	0–0	0–3	1–1		1–2	1–2
Sheffield Wednesday	3–0	2–1	3–2	4–0	0–0	2–0	1–1	3–0	3–0	0–0	3–2	3–1	1–1	1–1	2–0	1–3	0–0	1–0	3–1	1–1	1–1	0–1		4–1
Wolverhampton Wanderers	0–0	0–0	2–2	0–2	0–0	2–1	0–0	1–3	2–1	2–1	3–2	3–0	1–1	0–0	2–3	1–3	0–0	1–1	1–2	2–3	1–0	0–0	2–1	

Source: BBC Sport
Legend: Blue = home team win; Yellow = draw; Red = away team win.

== League One ==
=== Table ===
Pos	Team	Pld	W	D	L	GF	GA	GD	Pts	Promotion, qualification or relegation
1	Wigan Athletic (C, P)	46	24	15	7	82	45	+37	87	Promotion to EFL Championship
2	Burton Albion (P)	46	25	10	11	57	37	+20	85	Promotion to EFL Championship
3	Walsall	46	24	12	10	71	49	+22	84	Qualification for the League One play-offs (Note: Four teams play for one spot and promotion to Football League Championship.)
4	Millwall	46	24	9	13	73	49	+24	81	Qualification for the League One play-offs
5	Bradford City	46	23	11	12	55	40	+15	80	Qualification for the League One play-offs
6	Barnsley (O, P)	46	22	8	16	70	54	+16	74	Qualification for the League One play-offs
7	Scunthorpe United	46	21	11	14	60	47	+13	74	
8	Coventry City	46	19	12	15	67	49	+18	69	
9	Gillingham	46	19	12	15	71	56	+15	69	
10	Rochdale	46	19	12	15	68	61	+7	69	
11	Sheffield United	46	18	12	16	64	59	+5	66	
12	Port Vale	46	18	11	17	56	58	−2	65	
13	Peterborough United	46	19	6	21	82	73	+9	63	
14	Southend United	46	16	11	19	58	64	−6	59	
15	Swindon Town	46	16	11	19	64	71	−7	59	
16	Bury	46	16	12	18	56	73	−17	57 (Note: Bury were deducted 3 points for playing the unregistered Callum Styles against Southend United on 8 May.)	
17	Oldham Athletic	46	12	18	16	44	58	−14	54	
18	Chesterfield	46	15	8	23	58	70	−12	53	
19	Fleetwood Town	46	12	15	19	52	56	−4	51	
20	Shrewsbury Town	46	13	11	22	58	79	−21	50	
21	Doncaster Rovers (R)	46	11	13	22	48	64	−16	46	Relegation to EFL League Two
22	Blackpool (R)	46	12	10	24	40	63	−23	46	Relegation to EFL League Two
23	Colchester United (R)	46	9	13	24	57	99	−42	40	Relegation to EFL League Two
24	Crewe Alexandra (R)	46	7	13	26	46	83	−37	34	Relegation to EFL League Two

Updated to match(es) played on 1 July 2016. Source: BBC Sport
Rules for classification: 1) Points; 2) Goal difference; 3) Number of goals scored
(C) Champions; (O) Play-off winners; (P) Promoted; (R) Relegated

=== Play-offs ===
Semi-finals
3	Walsall	0	1	1
6	Barnsley	3	3	6
4	Millwall	3	1	4
5	Bradford City	1	1	2

Final
6	Barnsley	3
4	Millwall	1

=== Results ===
Home \ Away	BAR	BLP	BRA	BRT	BRY	CHF	COL	COV	CRE	DON	FLE	GIL	MIL	OLD	PET	PTV	ROC	SCU	SHU	SHR	STD	SWI	WAL	WIG
Barnsley		4–2	0–0	1–0	3–0	1–2	2–2	2–0	1–2	1–0	0–1	2–0	2–1	2–1	1–0	1–2	6–1	0–0	1–1	1–2	0–2	4–1	0–2	0–2
Blackpool	1–1		0–1	1–2	1–1	2–0	0–1	0–1	2–0	0–2	1–0	1–0	1–1	0–0	2–0	0–1	0–2	5–0	0–0	2–3	2–0	1–0	0–4	0–4
Bradford City	0–1	1–0		2–0	2–1	2–0	1–2	0–0	2–0	2–1	2–1	1–2	1–0	1–0	0–2	1–0	2–2	1–0	2–2	1–1	2–0	1–0	4–0	1–1
Burton Albion	0–0	1–0	3–1		1–1	1–0	5–1	1–2	0–0	3–3	2–1	2–1	2–1	0–0	2–1	2–0	1–0	2–1	0–0	1–2	1–0	1–0	0–0	1–1
Bury	0–0	4–3	0–0	1–0		1–0	5–2	2–1	0–0	1–0	3–4	0–1	1–3	1–1	3–1	1–0	0–0	1–2	1–0	2–2	3–2	2–2	2–3	2–2
Chesterfield	3–1	1–1	0–1	1–2	3–0		3–3	1–1	3–1	1–1	0–0	1–3	1–2	1–2	0–1	4–2	0–0	0–3	0–3	7–1	3–0	0–4	1–4	2–3
Colchester United	2–3	2–2	2–0	0–3	0–1	1–1		1–3	2–3	4–1	1–1	2–1	0–0	0–0	1–4	2–1	1–2	2–2	1–2	0–0	0–2	1–4	4–4	3–3
Coventry City	4–3	0–0	1–0	0–2	6–0	1–0	0–1		3–2	2–2	1–2	4–1	2–1	1–1	3–2	1–0	0–1	1–2	3–1	3–0	2–2	0–0	1–1	2–0
Crewe Alexandra	1–2	1–2	0–1	1–1	3–3	1–2	1–1	0–5		3–1	1–1	0–1	1–3	1–0	1–5	0–0	2–0	2–3	1–0	1–2	1–2	1–3	1–1	1–1
Doncaster Rovers	2–1	0–1	0–1	0–0	1–1	3–0	2–0	2–0	3–2		2–0	2–2	1–1	1–1	1–2	1–2	0–2	0–1	0–1	0–1	0–0	2–2	1–2	3–1
Fleetwood Town	0–2	0–0	1–1	4–0	2–0	0–1	4–0	0–1	2–0	0–0		2–1	2–1	1–1	2–0	1–2	1–1	2–1	2–2	0–0	1–1	5–1	0–1	1–3
Gillingham	2–1	2–1	3–0	0–3	3–1	1–2	1–0	0–0	3–0	1–0	5–1		1–2	3–3	2–1	0–2	2–0	2–1	4–0	2–3	1–1	0–0	1–2	2–0
Millwall	2–3	3–0	0–0	2–0	1–0	0–2	4–1	0–4	1–1	2–0	1–0	0–3		3–0	3–0	3–1	3–1	0–2	1–0	3–1	0–2	2–0	0–1	0–0
Oldham Athletic	1–2	1–0	1–2	0–1	0–1	1–0	1–1	0–2	1–0	1–2	1–0	2–1	1–2		1–5	1–1	2–3	2–4	1–1	1–1	2–5	2–0	1–0	1–1
Peterborough United	3–2	5–1	0–4	0–1	2–3	2–0	2–1	3–1	3–0	4–0	2–1	1–1	5–3	1–2		2–3	1–2	0–2	1–3	1–1	0–0	1–2	1–1	2–3
Port Vale	0–1	2–0	1–1	0–4	1–0	3–2	2–0	1–1	3–0	3–0	0–0	1–1	0–2	1–1	1–1		4–1	1–1	2–1	2–0	3–1	1–0	0–5	3–2
Rochdale	3–0	3–0	1–3	2–1	3–0	2–3	3–1	0–0	2–2	2–2	1–0	1–1	0–1	0–0	2–0	2–1		2–1	2–0	3–2	4–1	2–2	1–2	0–2
Scunthorpe United	2–0	0–1	0–2	1–0	2–1	1–1	3–0	1–0	2–0	2–0	1–0	0–0	0–0	1–1	0–4	1–0	1–1		0–1	2–1	1–0	6–0	0–1	1–1
Sheffield United	0–0	2–0	3–1	0–1	1–3	2–0	2–3	1–0	3–2	3–1	3–0	0–0	1–2	3–0	2–3	1–0	3–2	0–2		2–4	2–2	1–1	2–0	0–2
Shrewsbury Town	0–3	2–0	1–1	0–1	2–0	1–2	4–2	2–1	0–1	1–2	1–1	2–2	1–2	0–1	3–4	1–1	2–0	2–2	1–2		1–2	0–1	1–3	1–5
Southend United	2–1	1–0	0–1	3–1	4–1	0–1	3–0	3–0	1–1	0–3	2–2	1–1	0–4	0–1	2–1	1–0	2–2	2–1	3–1	0–1		0–1	0–2	0–0
Swindon Town	0–1	3–2	4–1	0–1	0–1	1–0	1–2	2–2	4–3	2–0	1–1	1–3	2–2	1–2	1–2	2–2	2–1	2–1	0–2	3–0	4–2		2–1	1–4
Walsall	1–3	1–1	2–1	2–0	0–1	1–2	2–1	2–1	1–1	2–0	3–1	3–2	0–3	1–1	2–0	2–0	0–3	0–0	1–1	2–1	1–0	1–1		1–2
Wigan Athletic	1–4	0–1	1–0	0–1	3–0	3–1	5–0	1–0	1–0	0–0	2–1	3–2	2–2	0–0	1–1	3–0	1–0	3–0	3–3	1–0	4–1	1–0	0–0	

Updated to match(es) played on 7 May 2016. Source: BBC Sport
Legend: Blue = home team win; Yellow = draw; Red = away team win.

== League Two ==
=== Table ===
Pos	Team	Pld	W	D	L	GF	GA	GD	Pts	Promotion, qualification or relegation
1	Northampton Town (C, P)	46	29	12	5	82	46	+36	99	Promotion to EFL League One
2	Oxford United (P)	46	24	14	8	84	41	+43	86	Promotion to EFL League One
3	Bristol Rovers (P)	46	26	7	13	77	46	+31	85	Promotion to EFL League One
4	Accrington Stanley	46	24	13	9	74	48	+26	85	Qualification for League Two play-offs (Note: Four teams play for one spot and promotion to Football League One.)
5	Plymouth Argyle	46	24	9	13	72	46	+26	81	Qualification for League Two play-offs
6	Portsmouth	46	21	15	10	75	44	+31	78	Qualification for League Two play-offs
7	AFC Wimbledon (O, P)	46	21	12	13	64	50	+14	75	Qualification for League Two play-offs
8	Leyton Orient	46	19	12	15	60	61	−1	69	
9	Cambridge United	46	18	14	14	66	55	+11	68	
10	Carlisle United	46	17	16	13	67	62	+5	67	
11	Luton Town	46	19	9	18	63	61	+2	66	
12	Mansfield Town	46	17	13	16	61	53	+8	64	
13	Wycombe Wanderers	46	17	13	16	45	44	+1	64	
14	Exeter City	46	17	13	16	63	65	−2	64	
15	Barnet	46	17	11	18	67	68	−1	62	
16	Hartlepool United	46	15	6	25	49	72	−23	51	
17	Notts County	46	14	9	23	54	83	−29	51	
18	Stevenage	46	11	15	20	52	67	−15	48	
19	Yeovil Town	46	11	15	20	43	59	−16	48	
20	Crawley Town	46	13	8	25	45	78	−33	47	
21	Morecambe	46	12	10	24	69	91	−22	46	
22	Newport County	46	10	13	23	43	64	−21	43	
23	Dagenham & Redbridge (R)	46	8	10	28	46	81	−35	34	Relegation to the National League
24	York City (R)	46	7	13	26	51	87	−36	34	Relegation to the National League

Updated to match(es) played on 7 May 2016. Source: BBC Sport
Rules for classification: 1) Points; 2) Goal difference; 3) Number of goals scored
(C) Champions; (O) Play-off winners; (P) Promoted; (R) Relegated

=== Play-offs ===
Semifinals
4	Accrington Stanley	0	2	2
7	AFC Wimbledon	1	2	3
5	Plymouth Argyle	2	1	3
6	Portsmouth	2	0	2

Final
7	AFC Wimbledon	2
5	Plymouth Argyle	0

=== Results ===
Home \ Away	ACC	WIM	BAR	BRR	CAM	CRL	CRA	D&R	EXE	HAR	LEY	LUT	MAN	MOR	NPC	NOR	NTC	OXF	PLY	POR	STE	WYC	YEO	YOR
Accrington Stanley		3–4	2–2	1–0	1–1	1–1	4–1	3–1	4–2	3–1	1–0	1–1	1–0	2–2	2–2	1–1	3–2	1–3	2–1	1–3	0–0	1–1	2–1	3–0
AFC Wimbledon	0–0		2–0	0–0	1–2	1–0	1–0	0–1	2–1	2–0	1–0	4–1	3–1	2–5	1–0	1–1	2–1	1–2	0–2	0–1	1–2	1–1	2–3	2–1
Barnet	1–2	1–2		1–0	0–0	0–0	4–2	3–1	2–0	1–3	3–0	2–1	1–3	0–0	2–0	2–0	3–1	0–3	1–0	1–0	3–2	0–2	3–4	3–1
Bristol Rovers	0–1	3–1	3–1		3–0	2–0	3–0	2–1	3–1	4–1	2–1	2–0	1–0	2–1	1–4	0–1	0–0	0–1	1–1	1–2	1–2	3–0	2–1	2–1
Cambridge United	2–3	1–4	2–1	1–2		0–0	0–3	1–0	0–1	1–1	1–1	1–3	1–1	7–0	3–0	2–1	3–1	0–0	2–2	1–3	1–0	1–0	3–0	3–1
Carlisle United	2–0	1–1	3–2	3–2	4–4		3–1	2–1	1–0	1–0	2–2	1–2	1–2	2–3	0–1	1–4	3–0	0–2	0–2	2–2	1–0	1–1	3–2	1–1
Crawley Town	0–3	1–2	0–3	2–1	1–0	0–1		3–2	0–2	0–0	3–2	2–1	0–1	1–1	2–0	1–2	0–1	1–5	1–1	0–0	2–1	0–0	0–1	1–0
Dagenham & Redbridge	0–1	0–2	0–2	0–3	0–3	0–0	3–0		1–2	0–1	1–3	0–2	3–4	2–1	0–0	1–2	1–1	0–1	1–1	1–4	1–1	1–2	0–1	1–0
Exeter City	2–1	0–2	1–1	1–1	1–0	2–2	2–2	1–2		1–0	4–0	2–3	2–3	1–1	1–1	0–0	1–1	1–4	2–1	1–1	3–3	0–2	3–2	0–0
Hartlepool United	1–2	1–0	1–1	0–3	0–0	2–3	1–2	3–1	0–2		3–1	1–4	2–1	2–0	1–0	0–0	2–3	0–1	1–2	0–2	1–2	1–0	2–1	2–1
Leyton Orient	0–1	1–1	2–0	2–0	1–3	1–2	2–0	3–2	1–3	0–2		0–1	1–0	1–0	1–0	0–4	3–1	2–2	1–3	3–2	3–0	1–1	1–1	3–2
Luton Town	0–2	2–0	2–0	0–1	0–0	3–4	0–1	1–0	4–1	2–1	1–1		1–0	1–0	1–1	3–4	0–2	2–2	1–2	1–2	0–1	0–2	1–1	1–1
Mansfield Town	2–3	1–1	1–1	1–2	0–0	1–1	4–0	3–2	0–2	3–1	1–1	0–2		2–1	3–0	2–2	5–0	1–1	0–0	1–1	2–1	0–2	0–1	1–1
Morecambe	1–0	2–1	4–2	3–4	2–4	1–2	3–1	1–0	1–1	2–5	0–1	1–3	1–2		1–2	2–4	4–1	2–4	0–2	1–1	1–4	0–1	2–1	1–1
Newport County	0–2	2–2	0–3	1–4	0–1	1–0	0–3	2–2	1–1	0–0	2–3	3–0	1–0	1–2		2–2	0–1	1–1	1–2	0–1	2–2	1–0	0–0	0–3
Northampton Town	1–0	1–1	3–0	2–2	1–1	3–2	2–1	1–2	3–0	2–1	1–1	2–0	1–0	3–1	1–0		2–2	1–0	0–2	1–2	2–1	1–0	2–0	2–0
Notts County	1–1	0–2	4–2	0–2	1–2	0–5	4–1	0–0	1–4	1–0	0–1	3–2	0–2	2–2	4–3	1–2		2–4	0–2	2–1	1–0	0–0	2–0	1–0
Oxford United	1–2	1–0	2–3	1–2	1–0	1–1	1–1	4–0	3–0	2–0	0–1	2–3	2–2	0–0	1–1	0–1	3–1		1–0	1–1	1–1	3–0	2–0	4–0
Plymouth Argyle	1–0	1–2	2–1	1–1	1–2	4–1	2–1	2–3	1–2	5–0	1–1	0–1	3–0	2–0	1–0	1–2	1–0	2–2		1–2	3–2	0–1	1–0	3–2
Portsmouth	0–0	0–0	3–1	3–1	2–1	1–0	3–0	3–0	1–2	4–0	0–1	0–0	0–0	3–3	0–3	1–2	4–0	0–1	1–2		1–1	2–1	0–0	6–0
Stevenage	1–1	0–0	0–0	0–0	2–0	0–1	0–1	1–3	0–2	2–0	2–2	0–0	0–2	4–3	2–1	2–3	0–2	1–5	2–1	0–2		2–1	0–0	2–2
Wycombe Wanderers	0–1	1–2	1–1	1–0	1–0	1–1	2–0	1–1	1–0	2–1	0–2	0–1	1–0	0–2	0–2	2–3	2–2	2–1	1–2	2–2	1–0		0–0	3–0
Yeovil Town	1–0	1–1	2–2	0–1	2–3	0–0	2–1	2–2	0–2	1–2	0–1	3–2	0–1	2–4	1–0	1–1	1–0	0–0	0–0	1–1	2–2	0–1		1–0
York City	1–5	1–3	1–1	1–4	2–2	2–2	2–2	2–2	2–0	1–2	1–1	2–3	1–2	2–1	0–1	1–2	2–1	1–2	1–2	3–1	2–1	1–1	1–0	

Updated to match(es) played on 7 May 2016. Source: BBC Sport
Legend: Blue = home team win; Yellow = draw; Red = away team win.

== Managerial changes ==
Team	Outgoing manager	Manner of departure	Date of vacancy	Position in table at time of departure	Incoming manager	Date of appointment	Position in table at time of appointment
Portsmouth	(England) Andy Awford	Mutual Consent	13 April 2015	2014–15 season	(England) Paul Cook	12 May 2015	Pre-season
Blackpool	(England) Lee Clark	Resigned	9 May 2015	Pre-season	(England) Neil McDonald	2 June 2015	Pre-season
Chesterfield	(England) Paul Cook	Signed by Portsmouth	12 May 2015	Pre-season	(Wales) Dean Saunders	13 May 2015	Pre-season
Crawley Town	(Wales) Dean Saunders	Signed by Chesterfield	13 May 2015	Pre-season	(England) Mark Yates	19 May 2015	Pre-season
Leyton Orient	(Italy) Fabio Liverani	Mutual Consent	13 May 2015	Pre-season	(England) Ian Hendon	28 May 2015	Pre-season
Leeds United	(England) Neil Redfearn	Sacked	20 May 2015	Pre-season	(Germany) Uwe Rosler	20 May 2015	Pre-season
Stevenage	(England) Graham Westley	Out of Contract	21 May 2015	Pre-season	(England) Teddy Sheringham	21 May 2015	Pre-season
Derby County	(England) Steve McClaren	Sacked	25 May 2015	Pre-season	(England) Paul Clement	1 June 2015	Pre-season
Sheffield United	(England) Nigel Clough	Sacked	25 May 2015	Pre-season	(England) Nigel Adkins	2 June 2015	Pre-season
Plymouth Argyle	(Republic of Ireland) John Sheridan	Mutual consent	28 May 2015	Pre-season	(Scotland) Derek Adams	11 June 2015	Pre-season
Brentford	(England) Mark Warburton	End of Contract	1 June 2015	Pre-season	(Netherlands) Marinus Dijkhuizen	1 June 2015	Pre-season
Sheffield Wednesday	(England) Stuart Gray	Sacked	11 June 2015	Pre-season	(Portugal) Carlos Carvalhal	30 June 2015	Pre-season
Peterborough United	(Scotland) Dave Robertson	Sacked	6 September 2015	20th	(England) Graham Westley	21 September 2015	18th
Doncaster Rovers	(Scotland) Paul Dickov	Sacked	8 September 2015	17th	(Scotland) Darren Ferguson	16 October 2015	20th
Oldham Athletic	(Scotland) Darren Kelly	Sacked	12 September 2015	19th	(Northern Ireland) David Dunn	7 October 2015	18th
Brentford	(Netherlands) Marinus Dijkhuizen	Sacked	28 September 2015	19th	(England) Dean Smith	30 November 2015	11th
Rotherham United	(Scotland) Steve Evans	Sacked	28 September 2015	20th	(England) Neil Redfearn	9 October 2015	21st
Fleetwood Town	(Scotland) Graham Alexander	Sacked	30 September 2015	20th	(Scotland) Steven Pressley	6 October 2015	23rd
Newport County	(England) Terry Butcher	Sacked	1 October 2015	24th	(Republic of Ireland) John Sheridan	2 October 2015	24th
Swindon Town	(England) Mark Cooper	Sacked	17 October 2015	20th	(Northern Ireland) Martin Ling	3 November 2015	23rd
Leeds United	(Germany) Uwe Rosler	Sacked	19 October 2015	18th	(Scotland) Steve Evans	19 October 2015	18th
Charlton Athletic	(Israel) Guy Luzon	Sacked	24 October 2015	22nd	(Belgium) Karel Fraeye	26 October 2015	22nd
York City	(England) Russ Wilcox	Sacked	26 October 2015	21st	(Scotland) Jackie McNamara	4 November 2015	22nd
Cambridge United	(England) Richard Money	Sacked	2 November 2015	18th	(England) Shaun Derry	12 November 2015	18th
Huddersfield Town	(England) Chris Powell	Sacked	4 November 2015	18th	(United States) David Wagner	5 November 2015	18th
Queens Park Rangers	(England) Chris Ramsey	Sacked	4 November 2015	13th	(Netherlands) Jimmy Floyd Hasselbaink	4 December 2015	12th
Fulham	(Wales) Kit Symons	Sacked	8 November 2015	12th	(Serbia) Slaviša Jokanović	27 December 2015	18th
Blackburn Rovers	(England) Gary Bowyer	Sacked	10 November 2015	16th	(Scotland) Paul Lambert	15 November 2015	16th
Colchester United	(Wales) Tony Humes	Mutual Consent	26 November 2015	19th	(Northern Ireland) Kevin Keen	21 December 2015	24th
Chesterfield	(Wales) Dean Saunders	Sacked	28 November 2015	16th	(Northern Ireland) Danny Wilson	24 December 2015	18th
Walsall	(England) Dean Smith	Signed by Brentford	30 November 2015	4th	(Republic of Ireland) Sean O'Driscoll	18 December 2015	3rd
Yeovil Town	(Scotland) Paul Sturrock	Sacked	1 December 2015	24th	(Northern Ireland) Darren Way	31 December 2015	24th
Burton Albion	(Netherlands) Jimmy Floyd Hasselbaink	Signed by QPR	4 December 2015	1st	(England) Nigel Clough	7 December 2015	1st
Reading	(Scotland) Steve Clarke	Sacked	4 December 2015	9th	(England) Brian McDermott	17 December 2015	13th
Luton Town	(England) John Still	Sacked	17 December 2015	17th	(Wales) Nathan Jones	6 January 2016	15th
Dagenham & Redbridge	(England) Wayne Burnett	Sacked	21 December 2015	24th	(England) John Still	31 December 2015	23rd
Swindon Town	(Northern Ireland) Martin Ling	Resigned	29 December 2015	16th	(England) Luke Williams	21 January 2016	14th
Notts County	(Netherlands) Ricardo Moniz	Sacked	29 December 2015	15th	(Scotland) Jamie Fullarton	10 January 2016	18th
Oldham Athletic	(Northern Ireland) David Dunn	Sacked	12 January 2016	22nd	(Republic of Ireland) John Sheridan	13 January 2016	22nd
Newport County	(Republic of Ireland) John Sheridan	Signed by Oldham Athletic	13 January 2016	20th	(Wales) Warren Feeney	15 January 2016	20th
Charlton Athletic	(Belgium) Karel Fraeye	Sacked	13 January 2016	23rd	(Belgium) José Riga	14 January 2016	23rd
Bristol City	(England) Steve Cotterill	Sacked	14 January 2016	22nd	(England) Lee Johnson	6 February 2016	22nd
Leyton Orient	(England) Ian Hendon	Sacked	18 January 2016	11th	(England) Kevin Nolan	21 January 2016	11th
Scunthorpe United	(England) Mark Robins	Sacked	18 January 2016	16th	(Northern Ireland) Nick Daws	22 February 2016	13th
Stevenage	(England) Teddy Sheringham	Sacked	1 February 2016	19th	(Scotland) Darren Sarll	8 May 2016	2016–17 season
Barnsley	(England) Lee Johnson	Signed by Bristol City	6 February 2016	12th	(England) Paul Heckingbottom	15 June 2016	2016–17 season
Derby County	(England) Paul Clement	Sacked	6 February 2016	5th	(England) Darren Wassall	6 February 2016	5th
Rotherham United	(England) Neil Redfearn	Sacked	8 February 2016	22nd	(England) Neil Warnock	11 February 2016	22nd
Hartlepool United	(England) Ronnie Moore	Mutual Consent	10 February 2016	22nd	(England) Craig Hignett	10 February 2016	22nd
Walsall	(Republic of Ireland) Sean O'Driscoll	Sacked	6 March 2016	4th	(England) Jon Whitney	1 June 2016	2016–17 season
Nottingham Forest	(Scotland) Dougie Freedman	Sacked	13 March 2016	14th	(France) Philippe Montanier	26 June 2016	2016–17 season
Bolton Wanderers	(Northern Ireland) Neil Lennon	Mutual Consent	15 March 2016	24th	(England) Phil Parkinson	10 June 2016	2016–17 season
Notts County	(Scotland) Jamie Fullarton	Sacked	19 March 2016	19th	(England) Mark Cooper	20 March 2016	19th
Scunthorpe United	(Northern Ireland) Nick Daws	Appointed Assistant Manager	22 March 2016	13th	(Scotland) Graham Alexander	22 March 2016	13th
Leyton Orient	(England) Kevin Nolan	Removed From Managerial Role	12 April 2016	11th	(England) Andy Hessenthaler	3 June 2016	2016–17 season
Peterborough United	(England) Graham Westley	Sacked	23 April 2016	14th	(England) Grant McCann	16 May 2016	2016–17 season
Crawley Town	(England) Mark Yates	Sacked	25 April 2016	18th	(Republic of Ireland) Dermot Drummy	27 April 2016	18th
Colchester United	(Northern Ireland) Kevin Keen	Resigned	26 April 2016	23rd	(Republic of Ireland) John McGreal	4 May 2016	23rd
