= 2016–17 English Football League =

118th season of the English Football League

English Football League
- Season: 2016–17
- Champions: Newcastle United
- Promoted: Newcastle United; Brighton & Hove Albion; Huddersfield Town
- Relegated: Hartlepool United; Leyton Orient
- New clubs in league: Cheltenham Town; Grimsby Town

The 2016–17 English Football League was the 118th season of the English Football League. It began on 6 August 2016 and concluded with the Championship promotion play-off final at Wembley Stadium on 29 May 2017. The EFL is contested through three divisions. The divisions are the Championship, League One and League Two. The winner of the Championship, Newcastle United, and runner-up Brighton & Hove Albion were automatically promoted to the Premier League and they were joined by the winner of the Championship play-off, Huddersfield Town. The bottom two teams in League Two, Hartlepool United and Leyton Orient, were relegated to the National League.

It was the league's first season after rebranding from the Football League to the English Football League.

== Promotion and relegation following 2015-16 season ==
=== From the Premier League ===
Relegated to the Championship

- Newcastle United
- Norwich City
- Aston Villa

=== From the Championship ===
Promoted to the Premier League

- Burnley
- Middlesbrough
- Hull City

Relegated to League One

- Charlton Athletic
- Milton Keynes Dons
- Bolton Wanderers

=== From League One ===
Promoted to the Championship

- Wigan Athletic
- Burton Albion
- Barnsley

Relegated to League Two

- Doncaster Rovers
- Blackpool
- Colchester United
- Crewe Alexandra

=== From League Two ===
Promoted to League One

- Northampton Town
- Oxford United
- Bristol Rovers
- AFC Wimbledon

Relegated to the National League

- Dagenham & Redbridge
- York City

=== From the National League ===
Promoted to League Two

- Cheltenham Town
- Grimsby Town

== Championship ==
=== Table ===
Pos	Team	Pld	W	D	L	GF	GA	GD	Pts	Promotion, qualification or relegation
1	Newcastle United (C, P)	46	29	7	10	85	40	+45	94	Promotion to the Premier League
2	Brighton & Hove Albion (P)	46	28	9	9	74	40	+34	93	Promotion to the Premier League
3	Reading	46	26	7	13	68	64	+4	85	Qualification for the Championship play-offs (Note: Four teams play for one spot and promotion to the Premier League.)
4	Sheffield Wednesday	46	24	9	13	60	45	+15	81	Qualification for the Championship play-offs
5	Huddersfield Town (O, P)	46	25	6	15	56	58	−2	81	Qualification for the Championship play-offs
6	Fulham	46	22	14	10	85	57	+28	80	Qualification for the Championship play-offs
7	Leeds United	46	22	9	15	61	47	+14	75	
8	Norwich City	46	20	10	16	85	69	+16	70	
9	Derby County	46	18	13	15	54	50	+4	67	
10	Brentford	46	18	10	18	75	65	+10	64	
11	Preston North End	46	16	14	16	64	63	+1	62	
12	Cardiff City	46	17	11	18	60	61	−1	62	
13	Aston Villa	46	16	14	16	47	48	−1	62	
14	Barnsley	46	15	13	18	64	67	−3	58	
15	Wolverhampton Wanderers	46	16	10	20	54	58	−4	58	
16	Ipswich Town	46	13	16	17	48	58	−10	55	
17	Bristol City	46	15	9	22	60	66	−6	54	
18	Queens Park Rangers	46	15	8	23	52	66	−14	53	
19	Birmingham City	46	13	14	19	45	64	−19	53	
20	Burton Albion	46	13	13	20	49	63	−14	52	
21	Nottingham Forest	46	14	9	23	62	72	−10	51	
22	Blackburn Rovers (R)	46	12	15	19	53	65	−12	51	Relegation to EFL League One
23	Wigan Athletic (R)	46	10	12	24	40	57	−17	42	Relegation to EFL League One
24	Rotherham United (R)	46	5	8	33	40	98	−58	23	Relegation to EFL League One

Source: English Football League, Soccerway
Rules for classification: 1) Points; 2) Goal difference; 3) Number of goals scored; 4) Points in head-to-head matches; 5) Goal difference in head-to-head matches; 6) Goals scored in head-to-head matches; 7) Play-off.
(C) Champions; (O) Play-off winners; (P) Promoted; (R) Relegated

=== Play-offs ===
Semi-finals
3	Reading	1	1	2
6	Fulham	1	0	1
4	Sheffield Wednesday	0	1	1 (3)
5	Huddersfield Town	0	1	1 (4)

Final
3	Reading	0 (3)
5	Huddersfield Town	0 (4)

The four teams that finished from third to sixth played off, with the winning team, Huddersfield Town, gaining the final promotion spot to the Premier League.

In the play-off semi-finals the third-placed team played the sixth-placed team and the fourth-placed team played the fifth-placed team. The team that finished in the higher league position played away in the first leg and played at home in the second leg. If the aggregate score was level after both legs, then extra time was played. If the scores were still level, a penalty shoot-out decided the winner. The away goals rule does not apply in the playoffs.

The winners from the two semi-finals played at Wembley Stadium in the play-off final. The game is known as the richest game in football as the winning club is guaranteed significantly increased television rights payments estimated to be in the order of £170M.

=== Results ===
Home \ Away	AST	BAR	BIR	BLB	BRE	B&HA	BRI	BRT	CAR	DER	FUL	HUD	IPS	LEE	NEW	NWC	NOT	PNE	QPR	REA	ROT	SHW	WIG	WOL
Aston Villa		1–3	1–0	2–1	1–1	1–1	2–0	2–1	3–1	1–0	1–0	1–1	0–1	1–1	1–1	2–0	2–2	2–2	1–0	1–3	3–0	2–0	1–0	1–1
Barnsley	1–1		2–2	2–0	1–1	0–2	2–2	1–1	0–0	2–0	2–4	1–1	1–1	3–2	0–2	2–1	2–5	0–0	3–2	1–2	4–0	1–1	0–0	1–3
Birmingham City	1–1	0–3		1–0	1–3	1–2	1–0	0–2	0–0	1–2	1–0	2–0	2–1	1–3	0–0	3–0	0–0	2–2	1–4	0–1	4–2	2–1	0–1	1–3
Blackburn Rovers	1–0	0–2	1–1		3–2	2–3	1–1	2–2	1–1	1–0	0–1	1–1	0–0	1–2	1–0	1–4	2–1	2–2	1–0	2–3	4–2	0–1	1–0	1–1
Brentford	3–0	0–2	1–2	1–3		3–3	2–0	2–1	2–2	4–0	0–2	0–1	2–0	2–0	1–2	0–0	1–0	5–0	3–1	4–1	4–2	1–1	0–0	1–2
Brighton & Hove Albion	1–1	2–0	3–1	1–0	0–2		0–1	4–1	1–0	3–0	2–1	1–0	1–1	2–0	1–2	5–0	3–0	2–2	3–0	3–0	3–0	2–1	2–1	1–0
Bristol City	3–1	3–2	0–1	1–0	0–1	0–2		0–0	2–3	1–1	0–2	4–0	2–0	1–0	0–1	1–1	2–1	1–2	2–1	2–3	1–0	2–2	2–1	3–1
Burton Albion	1–1	0–0	2–0	1–1	3–5	0–1	1–2		2–0	1–0	0–2	0–1	1–2	2–1	1–2	2–1	1–0	0–1	1–1	2–4	2–1	3–1	0–2	2–1
Cardiff City	1–0	3–4	1–1	2–1	2–1	0–0	2–1	1–0		0–2	2–2	3–2	3–1	0–2	0–2	0–1	1–0	2–0	0–2	0–1	5–0	1–1	0–1	2–1
Derby County	0–0	2–1	1–0	1–2	0–0	0–0	3–3	0–0	3–4		4–2	1–1	0–1	1–0	0–2	1–0	3–0	1–1	1–0	3–2	3–0	2–0	0–0	3–1
Fulham	3–1	2–0	0–1	2–2	1–1	1–2	0–4	1–1	2–2	2–2		5–0	3–1	1–1	1–0	2–2	3–2	3–1	1–2	5–0	2–1	1–1	3–2	1–3
Huddersfield Town	1–0	2–1	1–1	1–1	2–1	3–1	2–1	0–1	0–3	1–0	1–4		2–0	2–1	1–3	3–0	2–1	3–2	2–1	1–0	2–1	0–1	1–2	1–0
Ipswich Town	0–0	4–2	1–1	3–2	1–1	0–0	2–1	2–0	1–1	0–3	0–2	0–1		1–1	3–1	1–1	0–2	1–0	3–0	2–2	2–2	0–1	3–0	0–0
Leeds United	2–0	2–1	1–2	2–1	1–0	2–0	2–1	2–0	0–2	1–0	1–1	0–1	1–0		0–2	3–3	2–0	3–0	0–0	2–0	3–0	1–0	1–1	0–1
Newcastle United	2–0	3–0	4–0	0–1	3–1	2–0	2–2	1–0	2–1	1–0	1–3	1–2	3–0	1–1		4–3	3–1	4–1	2–2	4–1	4–0	0–1	2–1	0–2
Norwich City	1–0	2–0	2–0	2–2	5–0	2–0	1–0	3–1	3–2	3–0	1–3	1–2	1–1	2–3	2–2		5–1	0–1	4–0	7–1	3–1	0–0	2–1	3–1
Nottingham Forest	2–1	0–1	3–1	0–1	2–3	3–0	1–0	4–3	1–2	2–2	1–1	2–0	3–0	3–1	2–1	1–2		1–1	1–1	3–2	2–0	1–2	4–3	0–2
Preston North End	2–0	1–2	2–1	3–2	4–2	2–0	5–0	1–1	3–0	0–1	1–2	3–1	1–1	1–4	1–2	1–3	1–1		2–1	3–0	1–1	1–1	1–0	0–0
Queens Park Rangers	0–1	2–1	1–1	1–1	0–2	1–2	1–0	1–2	2–1	0–1	1–1	1–2	2–1	3–0	0–6	2–1	2–0	0–2		1–1	5–1	1–2	2–1	1–2
Reading	1–2	0–0	0–0	3–1	3–2	2–2	2–1	3–0	2–1	1–1	1–0	1–0	2–1	1–0	0–0	3–1	2–0	1–0	0–1		2–1	2–1	1–0	2–1
Rotherham United	0–2	0–1	1–1	1–1	1–0	0–2	2–2	1–2	1–2	1–1	0–1	2–3	1–0	1–2	0–1	2–1	2–2	1–3	1–0	0–1		0–2	3–2	2–2
Sheffield Wednesday	1–0	2–0	3–0	2–1	1–2	1–2	3–2	1–1	1–0	2–1	1–2	2–0	1–2	0–2	2–1	5–1	2–1	2–1	1–0	0–2	1–0		2–1	0–0
Wigan Athletic	0–2	3–2	1–1	3–0	2–1	0–1	0–1	0–0	0–0	0–1	0–0	0–1	2–3	1–1	0–2	2–2	0–0	0–0	0–1	0–3	3–2	0–1		2–1
Wolverhampton Wanderers	1–0	0–4	1–2	0–0	3–1	0–2	3–2	1–1	3–1	2–3	4–4	0–1	0–0	0–1	0–1	1–2	1–0	1–0	1–2	2–0	1–0	0–2	0–1	

Source: BBC Sport
Legend: Blue = home team win; Yellow = draw; Red = away team win.

== League One ==
=== Table ===
Pos	Team	Pld	W	D	L	GF	GA	GD	Pts	Promotion, qualification or relegation
1	Sheffield United (C, P)	46	30	10	6	92	47	+45	100	Promotion to the EFL Championship
2	Bolton Wanderers (P)	46	25	11	10	68	36	+32	86	Promotion to the EFL Championship
3	Scunthorpe United	46	24	10	12	80	54	+26	82	Qualification for the League One play-offs (Note: Four teams play for one spot and promotion to the EFL Championship.)
4	Fleetwood Town	46	23	13	10	64	43	+21	82	Qualification for the League One play-offs
5	Bradford City	46	20	19	7	62	43	+19	79	Qualification for the League One play-offs
6	Millwall (O, P)	46	20	13	13	66	57	+9	73	Qualification for the League One play-offs
7	Southend United	46	20	12	14	70	53	+17	72	
8	Oxford United	46	20	9	17	65	52	+13	69	
9	Rochdale	46	19	12	15	71	62	+9	69	
10	Bristol Rovers	46	18	12	16	68	70	−2	66	
11	Peterborough United	46	17	11	18	62	62	0	62	
12	Milton Keynes Dons	46	16	13	17	60	58	+2	61	
13	Charlton Athletic	46	14	18	14	60	53	+7	60	
14	Walsall	46	14	16	16	51	58	−7	58	
15	AFC Wimbledon	46	13	18	15	52	55	−3	57	
16	Northampton Town	46	14	11	21	60	73	−13	53	
17	Oldham Athletic	46	12	17	17	31	44	−13	53	
18	Shrewsbury Town	46	13	12	21	46	63	−17	51	
19	Bury	46	13	11	22	61	73	−12	50	
20	Gillingham	46	12	14	20	59	79	−20	50	
21	Port Vale (R)	46	12	13	21	45	70	−25	49	Relegation to EFL League Two
22	Swindon Town (R)	46	11	11	24	44	66	−22	44	Relegation to EFL League Two
23	Coventry City (R)	46	9	12	25	37	68	−31	39	Relegation to EFL League Two
24	Chesterfield (R)	46	9	10	27	43	78	−35	37	Relegation to EFL League Two

Source: BBC Sport
Rules for classification: 1) Points; 2) Goal difference; 3) Number of goals scored
(C) Champions; (O) Play-off winners; (P) Promoted; (R) Relegated

=== Play-offs ===
Semi-finals
3	Scunthorpe United	0	2	2
6	Millwall	0	3	3
4	Fleetwood Town	0	0	0
5	Bradford City	1	0	1

Final
6	Millwall	1
5	Bradford City	0

=== Results ===
Home \ Away	WIM	BOL	BRA	BRR	BRY	CHA	CHF	COV	FLE	GIL	MIL	MKD	NOR	OLD	OXF	PET	PTV	ROC	SCU	SHU	SHR	STD	SWI	WAL
AFC Wimbledon		1–2	2–3	0–1	5–1	1–1	2–1	1–1	2–2	2–0	2–2	2–0	0–1	0–0	2–1	0–0	4–0	3–1	1–2	2–3	1–1	0–2	0–0	1–0
Bolton Wanderers	1–1		0–0	1–1	0–0	1–2	0–0	1–0	2–1	4–0	2–0	1–1	2–1	2–0	0–2	3–0	3–1	1–0	2–1	1–0	2–1	1–1	1–2	4–1
Bradford City	3–0	2–2		1–1	1–1	0–0	2–0	3–1	2–1	2–2	1–1	2–2	1–0	1–1	1–0	1–0	0–0	4–0	0–0	3–3	2–0	1–1	2–1	1–0
Bristol Rovers	2–0	1–2	1–1		4–2	1–5	2–1	4–1	2–1	2–1	3–4	0–0	5–0	1–0	2–1	1–2	2–1	2–2	1–1	0–0	2–0	2–0	1–0	1–1
Bury	1–2	0–2	0–2	3–0		2–0	2–1	2–1	0–0	1–2	2–3	0–0	3–0	0–1	2–3	5–1	4–1	0–1	1–2	1–3	2–1	1–4	1–0	3–3
Charlton Athletic	1–2	1–1	1–1	4–1	0–1		1–0	3–0	1–1	3–0	0–0	0–2	1–1	1–1	0–1	0–2	2–0	0–1	2–1	1–1	3–0	2–1	3–0	1–1
Chesterfield	0–0	1–0	0–1	3–2	1–2	1–2		1–0	0–1	3–3	1–3	0–0	3–1	0–1	0–4	3–3	1–0	1–3	0–3	1–4	1–1	0–4	3–1	2–0
Coventry City	2–2	2–2	0–2	1–0	0–0	1–1	2–0		0–1	2–1	0–2	1–2	1–1	0–0	2–1	1–0	2–1	2–0	0–1	1–2	0–0	0–2	1–3	1–0
Fleetwood Town	0–0	2–4	2–1	3–1	0–0	2–2	2–1	2–0		2–1	1–0	1–4	3–0	1–0	2–0	2–0	0–0	0–0	2–2	1–1	3–0	1–1	0–1	2–1
Gillingham	2–2	0–4	1–1	3–1	2–1	1–1	1–1	2–1	2–3		1–1	1–0	2–1	1–2	0–1	0–1	1–1	3–0	3–2	1–2	1–1	2–1	1–1	1–1
Millwall	0–0	0–2	1–1	4–0	0–0	3–1	0–0	1–1	2–1	2–1		2–1	3–0	3–0	0–3	1–0	2–0	2–3	3–1	2–1	0–1	1–0	2–0	0–0
Milton Keynes Dons	1–0	1–1	1–2	3–3	1–3	0–1	2–3	1–0	0–1	3–2	2–2		5–3	1–0	0–0	0–2	0–1	2–2	0–1	0–3	2–1	0–3	3–2	1–1
Northampton Town	0–0	0–1	1–2	2–3	3–2	2–1	3–1	3–0	1–1	0–0	1–3	3–2		1–2	0–0	0–1	2–1	2–3	1–2	1–2	1–1	4–0	2–1	2–0
Oldham Athletic	0–0	1–0	1–2	0–2	0–0	1–0	0–0	3–2	2–0	1–0	0–0	0–2	0–0		2–1	2–0	0–0	1–1	2–0	1–1	2–3	0–2	0–2	0–0
Oxford United	1–3	2–4	1–0	0–2	5–1	1–1	1–1	4–1	1–3	1–0	1–2	1–0	0–1	1–1		2–1	2–0	1–0	2–1	2–3	2–0	0–2	2–0	0–0
Peterborough United	0–1	1–0	0–1	4–2	3–1	2–0	5–2	1–1	1–2	1–1	5–1	0–4	3–0	1–1	1–2		2–2	3–1	0–2	0–1	2–1	1–4	2–2	1–1
Port Vale	2–0	0–2	1–2	1–1	2–2	1–1	1–0	0–2	2–1	2–1	3–1	0–0	2–3	2–2	2–2	0–3		1–0	3–1	0–3	2–1	2–0	3–2	0–1
Rochdale	1–1	1–0	1–1	0–0	2–0	3–3	3–0	2–0	2–1	4–1	3–3	0–1	1–1	1–0	0–4	2–3	3–0		3–2	3–3	2–1	3–0	4–0	4–0
Scunthorpe United	1–2	1–0	3–2	3–1	3–2	0–0	3–1	3–1	0–2	5–0	3–0	2–1	1–1	1–0	1–1	1–1	3–2	2–1		2–2	0–1	4–0	4–1	0–0
Sheffield United	4–0	2–0	3–0	1–0	1–0	2–1	3–2	2–0	0–2	2–2	2–0	2–1	1–0	2–0	2–1	1–0	4–0	1–1	1–1		2–1	0–3	4–0	0–1
Shrewsbury Town	2–1	0–2	1–0	2–0	2–1	4–3	2–1	0–0	0–1	2–3	1–2	0–1	2–4	1–0	2–0	1–1	0–0	1–0	0–1	0–3		1–0	1–1	1–1
Southend United	3–0	0–1	3–0	1–1	1–0	1–1	1–0	3–1	0–2	1–3	3–1	1–2	2–2	3–0	2–1	1–1	1–1	2–1	3–1	2–4	1–1		1–1	3–2
Swindon Town	0–0	0–1	1–0	1–2	1–2	3–0	0–1	1–0	1–1	3–1	1–0	1–1	1–3	0–0	1–2	0–1	1–0	3–0	1–2	2–4	1–1	0–0		0–2
Walsall	3–1	1–0	1–1	3–1	3–3	1–2	1–0	1–1	0–1	1–2	2–1	1–4	2–1	2–0	1–1	2–0	0–1	0–2	1–4	4–1	3–2	0–0	1–0	

Updated to match(es) played on 30 April 2017. Source: BBC Sport
Legend: Blue = home team win; Yellow = draw; Red = away team win.

== League Two ==
=== Table ===
Pos	Team	Pld	W	D	L	GF	GA	GD	Pts	Promotion, qualification or relegation
1	Portsmouth (C, P)	46	26	9	11	79	40	+39	87	Promotion to EFL League One
2	Plymouth Argyle (P)	46	26	9	11	71	46	+25	87	Promotion to EFL League One
3	Doncaster Rovers (P)	46	25	10	11	85	55	+30	85	Promotion to EFL League One
4	Luton Town	46	20	17	9	70	43	+27	77	Qualification for League Two play-offs (Note: Four teams play for one spot and promotion to EFL League One)
5	Exeter City	46	21	8	17	75	56	+19	71	Qualification for League Two play-offs
6	Carlisle United	46	18	17	11	69	68	+1	71	Qualification for League Two play-offs
7	Blackpool (O, P)	46	18	16	12	69	46	+23	70	Qualification for League Two play-offs
8	Colchester United	46	19	12	15	67	57	+10	69	
9	Wycombe Wanderers	46	19	12	15	58	53	+5	69	
10	Stevenage	46	20	7	19	67	63	+4	67	
11	Cambridge United	46	19	9	18	58	50	+8	66	
12	Mansfield Town	46	17	15	14	54	50	+4	66	
13	Accrington Stanley	46	17	14	15	59	56	+3	65	
14	Grimsby Town	46	17	11	18	59	63	−4	62	
15	Barnet	46	14	15	17	57	64	−7	57	
16	Notts County	46	16	8	22	54	76	−22	56	
17	Crewe Alexandra	46	14	13	19	58	67	−9	55	
18	Morecambe	46	14	10	22	53	73	−20	52	
19	Crawley Town	46	13	12	21	53	71	−18	51	
20	Yeovil Town	46	11	17	18	49	64	−15	50	
21	Cheltenham Town	46	12	14	20	49	69	−20	50	
22	Newport County	46	12	12	22	51	73	−22	48	
23	Hartlepool United (R)	46	11	13	22	54	75	−21	46	Relegation to the National League
24	Leyton Orient (R)	46	10	6	30	47	87	−40	36	Relegation to the National League

Updated to match(es) played on 6 May 2017. Source: BBC Sport
Rules for classification: 1) Points; 2) Goal difference; 3) Number of goals scored
(C) Champions; (O) Play-off winners; (P) Promoted; (R) Relegated

=== Play-offs ===
Semifinals
4	Luton Town	2	3	5
7	Blackpool	3	3	6
5	Exeter City	3	3	6
6	Carlisle United	3	2	5

Final
7	Blackpool	2
5	Exeter City	1

=== Results ===
Home \ Away	ACC	BAR	BLP	CAM	CRL	CHL	COL	CRA	CRE	DON	EXE	GRI	HAR	LEY	LUT	MAN	MOR	NPC	NTC	PLY	POR	STE	WYC	YEO
Accrington Stanley		1–0	2–1	2–0	1–1	1–1	2–1	1–0	3–2	3–2	1–2	1–1	2–2	5–0	1–4	1–1	2–3	1–3	2–0	0–1	1–0	0–1	2–2	1–1
Barnet	2–0		1–1	0–1	0–1	3–1	1–1	2–2	0–0	1–3	1–4	3–1	3–2	0–0	0–1	0–2	2–2	0–0	3–2	1–0	1–1	1–2	0–2	2–2
Blackpool	0–0	2–2		1–1	2–2	3–0	1–1	0–0	2–2	4–2	2–0	1–3	2–1	3–1	0–2	0–1	3–1	4–1	4–0	0–1	3–1	1–0	0–0	2–2
Cambridge United	2–1	1–1	0–0		2–2	3–1	1–1	2–0	2–1	2–3	1–0	0–1	0–1	3–0	0–3	1–3	1–2	3–2	4–0	0–1	0–1	0–0	1–2	1–0
Carlisle United	1–1	1–1	1–4	0–3		1–1	2–0	3–1	0–2	2–1	3–2	1–3	3–2	2–2	0–0	5–2	1–1	2–1	1–2	1–0	0–3	1–1	1–0	2–1
Cheltenham Town	3–0	1–2	2–2	0–1	1–0		0–3	2–1	2–0	0–1	1–3	2–1	1–0	1–1	1–1	0–0	3–1	1–1	2–3	1–2	1–1	0–0	0–1	2–0
Colchester United	1–2	2–1	3–2	2–0	4–1	2–0		2–3	4–0	1–1	2–3	3–2	2–1	0–3	2–1	2–0	2–2	0–0	2–1	0–0	0–4	4–0	1–0	2–0
Crawley Town	0–0	1–1	1–0	1–3	3–3	0–0	1–1		0–3	0–0	1–2	3–2	1–0	3–0	2–0	2–2	1–3	3–1	1–3	1–2	0–2	1–2	1–0	2–0
Crewe Alexandra	0–1	4–1	1–1	1–2	1–1	0–0	2–0	0–2		2–1	2–0	5–0	3–3	3–0	1–2	1–1	2–1	1–2	2–2	1–2	0–0	1–2	2–1	0–1
Doncaster Rovers	2–2	3–2	0–1	1–0	2–2	2–0	1–0	1–1	3–1		1–3	1–0	2–1	3–1	1–1	1–0	1–1	2–0	3–1	0–1	3–1	1–0	2–2	4–1
Exeter City	0–2	2–1	2–2	1–2	2–3	3–0	3–0	0–1	4–0	1–3		0–0	1–2	4–0	0–0	2–0	3–1	0–1	0–2	0–2	0–1	1–1	4–2	3–3
Grimsby Town	2–0	2–2	0–0	2–1	2–2	0–1	1–0	1–1	0–2	1–5	0–3		0–3	1–2	1–1	3–0	2–0	1–0	2–0	1–1	0–1	5–2	1–2	4–2
Hartlepool United	2–0	0–2	0–1	0–5	1–1	2–0	1–1	1–1	4–0	2–1	3–1	0–1		1–3	1–1	0–0	3–2	2–2	1–2	1–1	0–2	2–0	0–2	1–1
Leyton Orient	1–0	1–3	1–2	1–1	1–2	0–1	1–3	3–2	0–2	1–4	0–1	0–3	2–1		1–2	1–2	0–1	0–1	2–3	0–2	0–1	3–0	0–2	0–1
Luton Town	1–0	3–1	1–0	2–0	1–1	2–3	0–1	2–1	1–1	3–1	1–1	1–2	3–0	2–2		1–1	3–1	2–1	2–1	1–1	1–3	0–2	4–1	1–1
Mansfield Town	4–4	0–1	1–0	0–0	2–0	1–1	0–0	3–1	3–0	1–1	1–2	0–1	4–0	2–0	1–1		0–1	2–1	3–1	0–2	0–1	1–2	1–1	1–0
Morecambe	1–2	0–1	2–1	2–0	0–3	1–2	1–1	2–3	0–0	1–5	0–3	1–0	1–1	1–2	0–2	1–3		0–1	4–1	2–1	2–0	0–2	1–1	1–3
Newport County	1–0	2–2	1–3	1–2	2–0	2–2	1–1	1–0	1–1	0–0	1–4	0–0	3–1	0–4	1–1	2–3	1–1		2–1	1–3	2–3	0–2	0–1	1–0
Notts County	0–2	1–0	1–0	0–1	2–3	2–1	3–1	2–1	1–1	0–1	2–2	2–2	2–1	3–1	0–0	0–0	1–2	0–3		1–2	1–3	1–1	0–2	0–0
Plymouth Argyle	0–1	0–2	0–3	2–1	2–0	1–0	2–1	2–0	2–1	2–0	3–0	0–3	1–1	2–3	0–3	2–0	1–0	6–1	0–1		2–2	4–2	3–3	4–1
Portsmouth	2–0	5–1	2–0	2–1	1–1	6–1	2–0	3–0	0–1	1–2	0–1	4–0	0–0	2–1	1–0	4–0	1–1	2–1	1–2	1–1		1–2	4–2	3–1
Stevenage	0–3	1–0	0–2	1–2	1–2	2–1	2–4	2–1	1–2	3–4	0–2	2–0	6–1	4–1	2–1	0–1	0–1	3–1	3–0	1–2	3–0		3–0	2–2
Wycombe Wanderers	1–1	0–2	0–0	1–0	1–2	3–3	0–2	1–2	5–1	2–1	1–0	2–1	2–0	1–0	1–1	0–1	2–0	2–1	0–1	1–1	1–0	1–0		1–1
Yeovil Town	1–1	0–1	0–3	1–1	0–2	4–2	2–1	5–0	3–0	0–3	0–0	0–0	1–2	1–1	0–4	0–0	0–1	1–0	2–0	2–1	0–0	1–1	1–0	

Updated to match(es) played on 6 May 2017. Source: BBC Sport
Legend: Blue = home team win; Yellow = draw; Red = away team win.

== Managerial changes ==
Team	Outgoing manager	Manner of departure	Date of vacancy	Position in table at time of departure	Incoming manager	Date of appointment	Position in table at time of appointment
Stevenage	(England) Teddy Sheringham	Sacked	1 February 2016	2015–16 season	(England) Darren Sarll	8 May 2016	Pre-season
Barnsley	(England) Lee Johnson	Signed by Bristol City	6 February 2016	2015–16 season	(England) Paul Heckingbottom	15 June 2016	Pre-season
Walsall	(Republic of Ireland) Sean O'Driscoll	Sacked	6 March 2016	2015–16 season	(England) Jon Whitney	1 June 2016	Pre-season
Nottingham Forest	(Scotland) Dougie Freedman	Sacked	13 March 2016	2015–16 season	(France) Philippe Montanier	26 June 2016	Pre-season
Bolton Wanderers	(Northern Ireland) Neil Lennon	Mutual Consent	15 March 2016	2015–16 season	(England) Phil Parkinson	10 June 2016	Pre-season
Aston Villa	(France) Rémi Garde	Mutual Consent	29 March 2016	2015–16 Premier League season	(Italy) Roberto Di Matteo	2 June 2016	Pre-season
Leyton Orient	(England) Kevin Nolan	Removed From Managerial Role	12 April 2016	2015–16 season	(England) Andy Hessenthaler	3 June 2016	Pre-season
Peterborough United	(England) Graham Westley	Sacked	23 April 2016	2015–16 season	(England) Grant McCann	16 May 2016	Pre-season
Blackburn Rovers	(Scotland) Paul Lambert	Mutual consent	7 May 2016	Pre-season	(Republic of Ireland) Owen Coyle	2 June 2016	Pre-season
Cardiff City	(England) Russell Slade	Promoted to head of football	7 May 2016	Pre-season	(Wales) Paul Trollope	18 May 2016	Pre-season
Charlton Athletic	(Belgium) José Riga	Resigned	7 May 2016	Pre-season	(England) Russell Slade	6 June 2016	Pre-season
Notts County	(England) Mark Cooper	End of contract	7 May 2016	Pre-season	(Republic of Ireland) John Sheridan	27 May 2016	Pre-season
Sheffield United	(England) Nigel Adkins	Sacked	12 May 2016	Pre-season	(England) Chris Wilder	12 May 2016	Pre-season
Northampton Town	(England) Chris Wilder	Signed by Sheffield United	12 May 2016	Pre-season	(Wales) Rob Page	19 May 2016	Pre-season
Blackpool	(England) Neil McDonald	Mutual Consent	18 May 2016	Pre-season	(England) Gary Bowyer	1 June 2016	Pre-season
Rotherham United	(England) Neil Warnock	End of contract	18 May 2016	Pre-season	(England) Alan Stubbs	1 June 2016	Pre-season
Port Vale	(Wales) Rob Page	Signed by Northampton Town	19 May 2016	Pre-season	(Portugal) Bruno Ribeiro	20 June 2016	Pre-season
Reading	(England) Brian McDermott	Sacked	27 May 2016	Pre-season	(Netherlands) Jaap Stam	13 June 2016	Pre-season
Oldham Athletic	(Republic of Ireland) John Sheridan	Signed by Notts County	27 May 2016	Pre-season	(Northern Ireland) Steve Robinson	9 July 2016	Pre-season
Derby County	(England) Darren Wassall	Reappointed Academy Director	27 May 2016	Pre-season	(England) Nigel Pearson	27 May 2016	Pre-season
Leeds United	(Scotland) Steve Evans	Sacked	31 May 2016	Pre-season	(England) Garry Monk	2 June 2016	Pre-season
Bradford City	(England) Phil Parkinson	Signed by Bolton Wanderers	10 June 2016	Pre-season	(Scotland) Stuart McCall	20 June 2016	Pre-season
Fleetwood Town	(Scotland) Steven Pressley	Resigned	26 July 2016	Pre-season	(Germany) Uwe Rösler	30 July 2016	Pre-season
Wolverhampton Wanderers	(Wales) Kenny Jackett	Sacked	29 July 2016	Pre-season	(Italy) Walter Zenga	30 July 2016	Pre-season
Leyton Orient	(England) Andy Hessenthaler	Sacked	26 September 2016	14th	(Italy) Alberto Cavasin	2 October 2016	17th
Newport County	(England) Warren Feeney	Sacked	28 September 2016	24th	(England) Graham Westley	7 October 2016	24th
Coventry City	(England) Tony Mowbray	Resigned	29 September 2016	24th	(England) Russell Slade	21 December 2016	23rd
Aston Villa	(Italy) Roberto Di Matteo	Sacked	3 October 2016	19th	(England) Steve Bruce	12 October 2016	19th
Cardiff City	(Wales) Paul Trollope	Sacked	4 October 2016	23rd	(England) Neil Warnock	5 October 2016	23rd
Shrewsbury Town	(Scotland) Micky Mellon	Signed by Tranmere Rovers	6 October 2016	22nd	(England) Paul Hurst	24 October 2016	24th
Derby County	(England) Nigel Pearson	Mutual Consent	8 October 2016	20th	(England) Steve McClaren	12 October 2016	20th
Rotherham United	(England) Alan Stubbs	Sacked	19 October 2016	24th	(Wales) Kenny Jackett	21 October 2016	24th
Milton Keynes Dons	(England) Karl Robinson	Mutual Consent	23 October 2016	19th	(Scotland) Robbie Neilson	2 December 2016	19th
Grimsby Town	(England) Paul Hurst	Signed by Shrewsbury Town	24 October 2016	8th	(Italy) Marcus Bignot	7 November 2016	8th
Wolverhampton Wanderers	(Italy) Walter Zenga	Sacked	25 October 2016	18th	(Scotland) Paul Lambert	5 November 2016	19th
Wigan Athletic	(Scotland) Gary Caldwell	Sacked	25 October 2016	23rd	(England) Warren Joyce	2 November 2016	22nd
Queens Park Rangers	(Netherlands) Jimmy Floyd Hasselbaink	Sacked	5 November 2016	17th	(England) Ian Holloway	11 November 2016	17th
Mansfield Town	(England) Adam Murray	Resigned	14 November 2016	18th	(Scotland) Steve Evans	16 November 2016	18th
Charlton Athletic	(England) Russell Slade	Sacked	14 November 2016	15th	(England) Karl Robinson	24 November 2016	11th
Bury	(England) David Flitcroft	Sacked	16 November 2016	16th	(England) Chris Brass	15 December 2016	20th
Leyton Orient	(Italy) Alberto Cavasin	Sacked	23 November 2016	22nd	(England) Andy Edwards	23 November 2016	22nd
Rotherham United	(Wales) Kenny Jackett	Resigned	28 November 2016	24th	(England) Paul Warne	5 April 2017	24th
Barnet	(England) Martin Allen	Signed by Eastleigh	1 December 2016	8th	(England) Kevin Nugent	15 February 2017	11th
Birmingham City	(England) Gary Rowett	Sacked	14 December 2016	7th	(Italy) Gianfranco Zola	14 December 2016	7th
Port Vale	(Portugal) Bruno Ribeiro	Resigned	26 December 2016	17th	(England) Michael Brown	3 May 2017	2017–18 season
Notts County	(Republic of Ireland) John Sheridan	Sacked	2 January 2017	22nd	(England) Kevin Nolan	12 January 2017	22nd
Gillingham	(England) Justin Edinburgh	Sacked	2 January 2017	17th	(England) Adrian Pennock	4 January 2017	17th
Chesterfield	(Northern Ireland) Danny Wilson	Sacked	8 January 2017	22nd	(Scotland) Gary Caldwell	17 January 2017	22nd
Crewe Alexandra	(England) Steve Davis	Sacked	8 January 2017	18th	(Gibraltar) David Artell	8 January 2017	18th
Northampton Town	(Wales) Rob Page	Sacked	9 January 2017	16th	(England) Justin Edinburgh	13 January 2017	16th
Oldham Athletic	(Northern Ireland) Steve Robinson	Sacked	12 January 2017	24th	(Republic of Ireland) John Sheridan	12 January 2017	24th
Nottingham Forest	(France) Philippe Montanier	Sacked	14 January 2017	20th	(England) Mark Warburton	14 March 2017	19th
Hartlepool United	(England) Craig Hignett	Mutual Consent	15 January 2017	19th	(England) Dave Jones	18 January 2017	19th
Leyton Orient	(England) Andy Edwards	Resigned	29 January 2017	23rd	(England) Daniel Webb	29 January 2017	23rd
Bury	(England) Chris Brass	Replaced	15 February 2017	21st	(England) Lee Clark	15 February 2017	21st
Blackburn Rovers	(Republic of Ireland) Owen Coyle	Mutual Consent	21 February 2017	23rd	(England) Tony Mowbray	22 February 2017	23rd
Coventry City	(England) Russell Slade	Sacked	5 March 2017	24th	(England) Mark Robins	6 March 2017	24th
Newport County	(England) Graham Westley	Sacked	9 March 2017	24th	(Wales) Michael Flynn	9 May 2017	2017–18 season
Norwich City	(Scotland) Alex Neil	Sacked	10 March 2017	8th	(Germany) Daniel Farke	25 May 2017	2017–18 season
Derby County	(England) Steve McClaren	Sacked	12 March 2017	10th	(England) Gary Rowett	14 March 2017	10th
Wigan Athletic	(England) Warren Joyce	Sacked	13 March 2017	23rd	(England) Graham Barrow	13 March 2017	23rd
Leyton Orient	(England) Daniel Webb	Resigned	30 March 2017	24th	(Turkey) Omer Riza	30 March 2017	24th
Grimsby Town	(Italy) Marcus Bignot	Sacked	10 April 2017	14th	(England) Russell Slade	12 April 2017	14th
Barnet	(England) Kevin Nugent	Sacked	15 April 2017	16th	(England) Rossi Eames	19 May 2017	2017–18 season
Birmingham City	(Italy) Gianfranco Zola	Resigned	17 April 2017	20th	(England) Harry Redknapp	18 April 2017	20th
Hartlepool United	(England) Dave Jones	Sacked	24 April 2017	23rd	(England) Craig Harrison	26 May 2017	2017–18 season
Leyton Orient	(Turkey) Omer Riza	Sacked	10 July 2017	24th	(England) Steve Davis	10 July 2017	2017–18 season
