= 2014–15 Football League =

116th season of the Football League

The Football League
- Season: 2014–15
- Champions: Bournemouth
- Promoted: Bournemouth; Watford; Norwich City
- Relegated: Cheltenham Town; Tranmere Rovers
- New Clubs in League: Luton Town; Cambridge United

The 2014–15 Football League (known as the Sky Bet Football League for sponsorship reasons) was the 116th season of the Football League. It consisted of the usual 72 clubs, with the new additions being Luton Town and play-off winners Cambridge United, who returned to the Football League for the first time since 2005, replacing Bristol Rovers and Torquay United from League Two.

== Promotion and relegation ==
=== From Premier League ===
Relegated to Championship

- Norwich City
- Fulham
- Cardiff City

=== From Championship ===
Promoted to Premier League

- Bournemouth
- Watford
- Norwich City

Relegated to League One

- Millwall
- Wigan Athletic
- Blackpool

=== From League One ===
Promoted to Championship

- Bristol City
- Milton Keynes Dons
- Preston North End

Relegated to League Two

- Notts County
- Crawley Town
- Leyton Orient
- Yeovil Town

=== From League Two ===
Promoted to League One

- Burton Albion
- Shrewsbury Town
- Bury

Relegated to Conference National

- Cheltenham Town
- Tranmere Rovers

=== From Conference National ===
Promoted to League Two

- Barnet
- Bristol Rovers

== Championship ==
=== Table ===
Pos	Team	Pld	W	D	L	GF	GA	GD	Pts	Promotion, qualification or relegation
1	Bournemouth (C, P)	46	26	12	8	98	45	+53	90	Promotion to the Premier League
2	Watford (P)	46	27	8	11	91	50	+41	89	Promotion to the Premier League
3	Norwich City (O, P)	46	25	11	10	88	48	+40	86	Qualification for Championship play-offs
4	Middlesbrough	46	25	10	11	68	37	+31	85	Qualification for Championship play-offs
5	Brentford	46	23	9	14	78	59	+19	78	Qualification for Championship play-offs
6	Ipswich Town	46	22	12	12	72	54	+18	78	Qualification for Championship play-offs
7	Wolverhampton Wanderers	46	22	12	12	70	56	+14	78	
8	Derby County	46	21	14	11	85	56	+29	77	
9	Blackburn Rovers	46	17	16	13	66	59	+7	67	
10	Birmingham City	46	16	15	15	54	64	−10	63	
11	Cardiff City	46	16	14	16	57	61	−4	62	
12	Charlton Athletic	46	14	18	14	54	60	−6	60	
13	Sheffield Wednesday	46	14	18	14	43	49	−6	60	
14	Nottingham Forest	46	15	14	17	71	69	+2	59	
15	Leeds United	46	15	11	20	50	61	−11	56	
16	Huddersfield Town	46	13	16	17	58	75	−17	55	
17	Fulham	46	14	10	22	62	83	−21	52	
18	Bolton Wanderers	46	13	12	21	54	67	−13	51	
19	Reading	46	13	11	22	48	69	−21	50	
20	Brighton & Hove Albion	46	10	17	19	44	54	−10	47	
21	Rotherham United	46	11	16	19	46	67	−21	46 (Note: Rotherham United were deducted three points for fielding an ineligible player.)	
22	Millwall (R)	46	9	14	23	42	76	−34	41	Relegation to Football League One
23	Wigan Athletic (R)	46	9	12	25	39	64	−25	39	Relegation to Football League One
24	Blackpool (R)	46	4	14	28	36	91	−55	26	Relegation to Football League One

Updated to match(es) played on 2 May 2015. Source: Sky Sports
Rules for classification: 1) Points; 2) Goal difference; 3) Number of goals scored
(C) Champions; (O) Play-off winners; (P) Promoted; (R) Relegated

=== Play-offs ===
Semi–Finals
3	Norwich City	1	3	4
6	Ipswich	1	1	2
4	Middlesbrough	2	3	5
5	Brentford	1	0	1

Final
3	Norwich City	2
4	Middlesbrough	0

=== Results ===
Home \ Away	BIR	BLB	BLP	BOL	BOU	BRE	BHA	CAR	CHA	DER	FUL	HUD	IPS	LEE	MID	MIL	NWC	NOT	REA	ROT	SHW	WAT	WIG	WOL
Birmingham City		2–2	1–0	0–1	0–8	1–0	1–0	0–0	1–0	0–4	1–2	1–1	2–2	1–1	1–1	0–1	0–0	2–1	6–1	2–1	0–2	2–1	3–1	2–1
Blackburn Rovers	1–0		1–1	1–0	3–2	2–3	0–1	1–1	2–0	2–3	2–1	0–0	3–2	2–1	0–0	2–0	1–2	3–3	3–1	2–1	1–2	2–2	3–1	0–1
Blackpool	1–0	1–2		1–1	1–6	1–2	1–0	1–0	0–3	0–1	0–1	0–0 (Note: Blackpool/Huddersfield match was abandoned, and was subsequently awarded as a 0-0 draw.)	0–2	1–1	1–2	1–0	1–3	4–4	1–1	1–1	0–1	0–1	1–3	0–0
Bolton Wanderers	0–1	2–1	1–1		1–2	3–1	1–0	3–0	1–1	0–2	3–1	1–0	0–0	1–1	1–2	2–0	1–2	2–2	1–1	3–2	0–0	3–4	3–1	2–2
Bournemouth	4–2	0–0	4–0	3–0		1–0	3–2	5–3	1–0	2–2	2–0	1–1	2–2	1–3	3–0	2–2	1–2	1–2	3–0	1–1	2–2	2–0	2–0	2–1
Brentford	1–1	3–1	4–0	2–2	3–1		3–2	1–2	1–1	2–1	2–1	4–1	2–4	2–0	0–1	2–2	0–3	2–2	3–1	1–0	0–0	1–2	3–0	4–0
Brighton & Hove Albion	4–3	1–1	0–0	2–1	0–2	0–1		1–1	2–2	2–0	1–2	0–0	3–2	2–0	1–2	0–1	0–1	2–3	2–2	1–1	0–1	0–2	1–0	1–1
Cardiff City	2–0	1–1	3–2	0–3	1–1	2–3	0–0		1–2	0–2	1–0	3–1	3–1	3–1	0–1	0–0	2–4	2–1	2–1	0–0	2–1	2–4	1–0	0–1
Charlton Athletic	1–1	1–3	2–2	2–1	0–3	3–0	0–1	1–1		3–2	1–1	3–0	0–1	2–1	0–0	0–0	2–3	2–1	3–2	1–1	1–1	1–0	2–1	1–1
Derby County	2–2	2–0	4–0	4–1	2–0	1–1	3–0	2–2	2–0		5–1	3–2	1–1	2–0	0–1	0–0	2–2	1–2	0–3	1–0	3–2	2–2	1–2	5–0
Fulham	1–1	0–1	2–2	4–0	1–5	1–4	0–2	1–1	3–0	2–0		3–1	1–2	0–3	4–3	0–1	1–0	3–2	2–1	1–1	4–0	0–5	2–2	0–1
Huddersfield Town	0–1	2–2	4–2	2–1	0–4	2–1	1–1	0–0	1–1	4–4	0–2		2–1	1–2	1–2	2–1	2–2	3–0	3–0	0–2	0–0	3–1	0–0	1–4
Ipswich Town	4–2	1–1	3–2	1–0	1–1	1–1	2–0	3–1	3–0	0–1	2–1	2–2		4–1	2–0	2–0	0–1	2–1	0–1	2–0	2–1	1–0	0–0	2–1
Leeds United	1–1	0–3	3–1	1–0	1–0	0–1	0–2	1–2	2–2	2–0	0–1	3–0	2–1		1–0	1–0	0–2	0–0	0–0	0–0	1–1	2–3	0–2	1–2
Middlesbrough	2–0	1–1	1–1	1–0	0–0	4–0	0–0	2–1	3–1	2–0	2–0	2–0	4–1	0–1		3–0	4–0	3–0	0–1	2–0	2–3	1–1	1–0	2–1
Millwall	1–3	2–2	2–1	0–1	0–2	2–3	0–0	1–0	2–1	3–3	0–0	1–3	1–3	2–0	1–5		1–4	0–0	0–0	0–1	1–3	0–2	2–0	3–3
Norwich City	2–2	3–1	4–0	2–1	1–1	1–2	3–3	3–2	0–1	1–1	4–2	5–0	2–0	1–1	0–1	6–1		3–1	1–2	1–1	2–0	3–0	0–1	2–0
Nottingham Forest	1–3	1–3	2–0	4–1	2–1	1–3	0–0	1–2	1–1	1–1	5–3	0–1	2–2	1–1	2–1	0–1	2–1		4–0	2–0	0–2	1–3	3–0	1–2
Reading	0–1	0–0	3–0	0–0	0–1	0–2	2–1	1–1	0–1	0–3	3–0	1–2	1–0	0–2	0–0	3–2	2–1	0–3		3–0	2–0	0–1	0–1	3–3
Rotherham United	0–1	2–0	1–1	4–2	0–2	0–2	1–0	1–3	1–1	3–3	3–3	2–2	2–0	2–1	0–3	2–1	1–1	0–0	2–1		2–3	0–2	1–2	1–0
Sheffield Wednesday	0–0	1–2	1–0	1–2	0–2	1–0	0–0	1–1	1–1	0–0	1–1	1–1	1–1	1–2	2–0	1–1	0–0	0–1	1–0	0–0		0–3	2–1	0–1
Watford	1–0	1–0	7–2	3–0	1–1	2–1	1–1	0–1	5–0	1–2	1–0	4–2	0–1	4–1	2–0	3–1	0–3	2–2	4–1	3–0	1–1		2–1	0–1
Wigan Athletic	4–0	1–1	1–0	1–1	1–3	0–0	2–1	0–1	0–3	0–2	3–3	0–1	1–2	0–1	1–1	0–0	0–1	0–0	2–2	1–2	0–1	0–2		0–1
Wolverhampton Wanderers	0–0	3–1	2–0	1–0	1–2	2–1	1–1	1–0	0–0	2–0	3–0	1–3	1–1	4–3	2–0	4–2	1–0	0–3	1–2	5–0	3–0	2–2	2–2	

Updated to match(es) played on 2 May 2015. Source: BBC Sport
Legend: Blue = home team win; Yellow = draw; Red = away team win.

== League One ==
=== Table ===
Pos	Team	Pld	W	D	L	GF	GA	GD	Pts	Promotion, qualification or relegation
1	Bristol City (C, P)	46	29	12	5	96	38	+58	99	Promotion to Football League Championship
2	Milton Keynes Dons (P)	46	27	10	9	101	44	+57	91	Promotion to Football League Championship
3	Preston North End (O, P)	46	25	14	7	79	40	+39	89	Qualification for League One play-offs (Note: Four teams play for one spot and promotion to Football League Championship.)
4	Swindon Town	46	23	10	13	76	57	+19	79	Qualification for League One play-offs
5	Sheffield United	46	19	14	13	66	53	+13	71	Qualification for League One play-offs
6	Chesterfield	46	19	12	15	68	55	+13	69	Qualification for League One play-offs
7	Bradford City	46	17	14	15	55	55	0	65	
8	Rochdale	46	19	6	21	72	66	+6	63	
9	Peterborough United	46	18	9	19	53	56	−3	63	
10	Fleetwood Town	46	17	12	17	49	52	−3	63	
11	Barnsley	46	17	11	18	62	61	+1	62	
12	Gillingham	46	16	14	16	65	66	−1	62	
13	Doncaster Rovers	46	16	13	17	58	62	−4	61	
14	Walsall	46	14	17	15	50	54	−4	59	
15	Oldham Athletic	46	14	15	17	54	67	−13	57	
16	Scunthorpe United	46	14	14	18	62	75	−13	56	
17	Coventry City	46	13	16	17	49	60	−11	55	
18	Port Vale	46	15	9	22	55	65	−10	54	
19	Colchester United	46	14	10	22	58	77	−19	52	
20	Crewe Alexandra	46	14	10	22	43	75	−32	52	
21	Notts County (R)	46	12	14	20	45	63	−18	50	Relegation to Football League Two
22	Crawley Town (R)	46	13	11	22	53	79	−26	50	Relegation to Football League Two
23	Leyton Orient (R)	46	12	13	21	59	69	−10	49	Relegation to Football League Two
24	Yeovil Town (R)	46	10	10	26	36	75	−39	40	Relegation to Football League Two

Updated to match(es) played on 3 May 2015. Source: BBC Sport
Rules for classification: 1) Points; 2) Goal difference; 3) Number of goals scored
(C) Champions; (O) Play-off winners; (P) Promoted; (R) Relegated

=== Play-offs ===
Semifinals
3	Preston North End	1	3	4
6	Chesterfield	0	0	0
4	Swindon Town	2	5	7
5	Sheffield United	1	5	6

Final
3	Preston North End	4
4	Swindon Town	0

=== Results ===
Home \ Away	BAR	BRA	BRI	CHF	COL	COV	CRA	CRE	DON	FLE	GIL	LEY	MKD	NTC	OLD	PET	PTV	PNE	ROC	SCU	SHU	SWI	WAL	YEO
Barnsley		3–1	2–2	1–1	3–2	1–0	0–1	2–0	1–1	1–2	4–1	2–0	3–5	2–3	1–0	1–1	2–1	1–1	5–0	1–2	0–2	0–3	3–0	2–0
Bradford City	1–0		0–6	0–1	1–1	3–2	1–0	2–0	1–2	2–2	1–1	3–1	2–1	1–0	2–0	0–1	1–1	0–3	1–2	1–1	0–2	1–2	1–1	1–3
Bristol City	2–2	2–2		3–2	2–1	0–0	1–0	3–0	3–0	2–0	0–0	0–0	3–2	4–0	1–0	2–0	3–1	0–1	1–0	2–0	1–3	3–0	8–2	2–1
Chesterfield	2–1	0–1	0–2		6–0	2–3	3–0	1–0	2–2	3–0	3–0	2–3	0–1	1–1	1–1	3–2	3–0	0–2	2–1	4–1	3–2	0–3	1–0	0–0
Colchester United	3–1	0–0	3–2	2–1		0–1	2–3	2–3	0–1	2–1	1–2	2–0	0–1	0–1	2–2	1–3	1–2	1–0	1–4	2–2	2–3	1–1	0–2	2–0
Coventry City	2–2	1–1	1–3	0–0	1–0		2–2	1–3	1–3	1–1	1–0	0–1	2–1	0–1	1–1	3–2	2–3	0–2	2–2	1–1	1–0	0–3	0–0	2–1
Crawley Town	5–1	1–3	1–2	1–1	0–0	1–2		1–1	0–5	1–0	1–2	1–0	2–2	2–0	2–0	1–4	1–2	2–1	0–4	2–2	1–1	1–0	1–0	2–0
Crewe Alexandra	1–2	0–1	1–0	0–0	0–3	2–1	0–0		1–1	2–0	3–1	1–1	0–5	0–3	0–1	1–0	2–1	1–1	2–5	2–0	0–1	0–0	1–1	1–0
Doncaster Rovers	1–0	0–3	1–3	3–2	2–0	2–0	0–0	2–1		0–0	1–2	0–2	0–0	0–0	0–2	0–2	1–3	1–1	1–1	5–2	0–1	1–2	0–2	3–0
Fleetwood Town	0–0	0–2	3–3	0–0	2–3	0–2	1–0	2–1	3–1		1–0	1–1	0–3	2–1	0–2	1–1	1–0	1–1	1–0	2–2	1–1	2–2	0–1	4–0
Gillingham	0–1	1–0	1–3	2–3	2–2	3–1	1–1	2–0	1–1	0–1		3–2	4–2	3–1	3–2	2–1	2–2	0–1	1–0	0–3	2–0	2–2	0–0	2–0
Leyton Orient	0–0	0–2	1–3	1–2	0–2	2–2	4–1	4–1	0–1	0–1	3–3		0–0	0–1	3–0	1–2	3–1	0–2	2–3	1–4	1–1	1–2	0–0	3–0
Milton Keynes Dons	2–0	1–2	0–0	1–2	6–0	0–0	2–0	6–1	3–0	2–1	4–2	6–1		4–1	7–0	3–0	1–0	0–2	2–2	2–0	1–0	2–1	0–3	5–1
Notts County	1–1	1–1	1–2	0–1	2–1	0–0	5–3	2–1	2–1	0–1	1–0	1–1	0–1		0–0	1–2	0–1	1–3	1–2	2–2	1–2	0–3	1–2	1–2
Oldham Athletic	1–3	2–1	1–1	0–0	0–1	4–1	1–1	1–2	2–2	1–0	0–0	1–3	1–3	3–0		1–1	1–1	0–4	3–0	3–2	2–2	2–1	2–1	0–4
Peterborough United	2–1	2–0	0–3	1–0	0–2	0–1	4–3	1–1	0–0	1–0	1–2	1–0	3–2	0–0	2–2		3–1	0–1	2–1	1–2	1–2	1–2	0–0	1–0
Port Vale	2–1	2–2	0–3	1–2	1–2	0–2	2–3	0–1	3–0	1–2	2–1	3–0	0–0	0–2	0–1	2–1		2–2	1–0	2–2	2–1	0–1	1–1	4–1
Preston North End	1–0	1–2	1–1	3–3	4–2	1–0	2–0	5–1	2–2	3–2	2–2	2–2	1–1	1–1	1–0	2–0	2–0		1–0	2–0	1–1	3–0	1–0	1–1
Rochdale	0–1	0–2	1–1	1–0	2–1	1–0	4–1	4–0	1–3	0–2	1–1	1–0	2–3	2–2	0–3	0–1	1–0	3–0		3–1	1–2	2–4	4–0	2–1
Scunthorpe United	0–1	1–1	0–2	2–0	1–1	2–1	2–1	2–1	1–2	0–2	2–1	1–2	1–1	0–1	0–1	2–0	1–1	0–4	2–1		1–1	3–1	2–1	1–1
Sheffield United	0–1	1–1	1–2	1–1	4–1	2–2	1–0	1–2	3–2	1–2	2–1	2–2	0–1	1–1	1–1	1–2	1–0	2–1	1–0	4–0		2–0	1–1	2–0
Swindon Town	2–0	2–1	1–0	3–1	2–2	1–1	1–2	2–0	0–1	1–0	0–3	2–2	0–3	3–0	2–2	1–0	1–0	1–0	2–3	3–1	5–2		3–3	0–1
Walsall	3–1	0–0	1–1	1–0	0–0	0–2	5–0	0–1	3–0	1–0	1–1	0–2	1–1	0–0	2–0	0–0	0–1	3–1	3–2	1–4	1–1	1–4		1–2
Yeovil Town	1–1	1–0	0–3	2–3	0–1	0–0	2–1	1–1	0–3	0–1	2–2	0–3	0–2	1–1	2–1	1–0	1–2	0–2	0–3	1–1	1–0	1–1	0–1	

Updated to match(es) played on 3 May 2015. Source: BBC Sport
Legend: Blue = home team win; Yellow = draw; Red = away team win.

== League Two ==
=== Table ===
Pos	Team	Pld	W	D	L	GF	GA	GD	Pts	Promotion, qualification or relegation
1	Burton Albion (C, P)	46	28	10	8	69	39	+30	94	Promotion to Football League One
2	Shrewsbury Town (P)	46	27	8	11	67	31	+36	89	Promotion to Football League One
3	Bury (P)	46	26	7	13	60	40	+20	85	Promotion to Football League One
4	Wycombe Wanderers	46	23	15	8	67	45	+22	84	Qualification for League Two play-offs (Note: Four teams play for one spot and promotion to Football League One.)
5	Southend United (O, P)	46	24	12	10	54	38	+16	84	Qualification for League Two play-offs
6	Stevenage	46	20	12	14	62	54	+8	72	Qualification for League Two play-offs
7	Plymouth Argyle	46	20	11	15	55	37	+18	71	Qualification for League Two play-offs
8	Luton Town	46	19	11	16	54	44	+10	68	
9	Newport County	46	18	11	17	51	54	−3	65	
10	Exeter City	46	17	13	16	61	65	−4	64	
11	Morecambe	46	17	12	17	53	52	+1	63	
12	Northampton Town	46	18	7	21	67	62	+5	61	
13	Oxford United	46	15	16	15	50	49	+1	61	
14	Dagenham & Redbridge	46	17	8	21	58	59	−1	59	
15	AFC Wimbledon	46	14	16	16	54	60	−6	58	
16	Portsmouth	46	14	15	17	52	54	−2	57	
17	Accrington Stanley	46	15	11	20	58	77	−19	56	
18	York City	46	11	19	16	46	51	−5	52	
19	Cambridge United	46	13	12	21	61	66	−5	51	
20	Carlisle United	46	14	8	24	56	74	−18	50	
21	Mansfield Town	46	13	9	24	38	62	−24	48	
22	Hartlepool United	46	12	9	25	39	70	−31	45	
23	Cheltenham Town (R)	46	9	14	23	40	67	−27	41	Relegation to the National League
24	Tranmere Rovers (R)	46	9	12	25	45	67	−22	39	Relegation to the National League

Updated to match(es) played on 23 May 2015. Source: BBC Sport
Rules for classification: 1) Points; 2) Goal difference; 3) Number of goals scored
(C) Champions; (O) Play-off winners; (P) Promoted; (R) Relegated

=== Play-offs ===
Semifinals
4	Wycombe Wanderers	3	2	5
7	Plymouth Argyle	2	1	3
5	Southend United	1	3	4
6	Stevenage	1	1	2

Final
4	Wycombe Wanderers	1 (6)
5	Southend United	1 (7)

=== Results ===
Home \ Away	ACC	WIM	BRT	BRY	CAM	CRL	CHL	D&R	EXE	HAR	LUT	MAN	MOR	NPC	NOR	OXF	PLY	POR	SHR	STD	STE	TRA	WYC	YOR
Accrington Stanley		1–0	1–0	0–1	2–1	3–1	1–1	1–2	2–3	3–1	2–2	2–1	2–1	0–2	1–5	1–0	1–0	1–1	1–2	0–1	2–2	3–2	1–1	2–2
AFC Wimbledon	2–1		3–0	3–2	1–2	1–3	1–1	1–0	4–1	1–2	3–2	0–1	1–0	2–0	2–2	0–0	0–0	1–0	2–2	0–0	2–3	2–2	0–0	2–1
Burton Albion	3–0	0–0		1–0	1–3	1–1	1–0	2–1	1–0	4–0	1–0	2–1	0–2	0–1	3–1	2–0	1–1	2–0	1–0	2–1	1–1	2–0	1–0	2–0
Bury	2–1	2–0	3–1		2–0	2–1	0–1	0–2	1–1	1–0	1–0	2–0	1–2	1–3	2–1	0–1	2–1	3–0	1–0	0–1	2–1	2–0	1–1	2–2
Cambridge United	2–2	0–0	2–3	0–2		5–0	1–2	1–1	1–2	2–1	0–1	3–1	1–2	4–0	2–1	5–1	1–0	2–6	0–0	0–1	1–1	1–2	0–1	0–3
Carlisle United	1–0	4–4	3–4	0–3	0–1		1–0	1–0	1–3	3–3	0–1	2–1	1–1	2–3	2–1	2–1	2–0	2–2	1–2	1–1	3–0	1–0	2–3	0–3
Cheltenham Town	2–1	1–1	1–3	1–2	3–1	0–0		1–1	1–2	1–0	1–1	1–1	1–1	0–1	3–2	1–1	0–3	1–1	0–1	0–1	0–1	2–0	1–4	0–1
Dagenham & Redbridge	4–0	4–0	1–3	1–0	2–3	4–2	3–1		1–2	2–0	0–0	2–0	0–3	0–1	0–2	0–0	2–0	0–0	1–2	1–3	0–2	0–1	0–1	2–0
Exeter City	1–2	3–2	1–1	2–1	2–2	2–0	1–0	2–1		1–2	1–1	1–2	1–1	2–0	0–2	1–1	1–3	1–1	3–2	0–1	0–0	1–2	2–1	1–1
Hartlepool United	1–1	1–0	0–1	0–2	2–1	0–3	2–0	0–2	2–1		1–2	1–0	0–2	2–2	1–0	1–1	3–2	0–0	2–0	0–1	1–3	0–0	1–3	1–3
Luton Town	2–0	0–1	0–1	1–1	3–2	1–0	1–0	3–1	2–3	3–0		3–0	2–3	3–0	1–0	2–0	0–1	1–1	0–0	2–0	2–0	1–0	2–3	2–2
Mansfield Town	0–1	2–1	1–2	0–1	0–0	3–2	1–1	2–1	2–3	1–1	1–0		1–0	1–0	1–1	2–1	1–0	1–2	0–1	1–2	1–0	1–0	0–0	1–4
Morecambe	1–1	1–1	1–2	1–0	0–2	0–1	0–0	2–3	0–2	0–1	3–0	2–1		3–2	0–1	1–0	2–1	3–1	1–4	3–1	0–0	0–0	1–3	1–1
Newport County	1–1	4–1	1–1	0–2	1–1	2–1	1–1	2–3	2–2	2–2	1–0	0–1	0–1		3–2	0–1	2–0	1–0	0–1	1–0	2–0	1–1	0–2	3–1
Northampton Town	4–5	2–0	1–2	2–3	0–1	0–2	2–0	1–0	1–0	5–1	2–1	1–0	2–1	3–0		1–3	2–3	1–0	1–1	1–1	1–0	1–0	2–3	3–0
Oxford United	3–1	0–0	0–1	2–1	2–0	2–1	1–2	3–3	2–2	0–2	1–1	3–0	1–1	1–0	1–1		0–0	0–1	0–2	2–3	0–0	2–0	1–2	0–0
Plymouth Argyle	1–0	1–1	1–1	0–2	2–0	1–0	3–0	3–0	3–0	2–0	0–1	2–1	1–1	0–0	2–0	1–2		3–0	1–0	2–0	1–1	3–2	0–1	1–1
Portsmouth	2–3	0–2	1–1	0–1	2–1	3–0	2–2	3–0	1–0	1–0	2–0	1–1	3–0	0–1	2–0	0–0	2–1		0–2	1–2	3–2	3–2	1–1	1–1
Shrewsbury Town	4–0	2–0	1–0	5–0	1–1	1–0	3–1	2–0	4–0	3–0	2–0	2–0	1–0	0–0	1–2	2–0	0–2	2–1		1–1	3–2	2–1	0–0	1–0
Southend United	1–2	0–1	0–0	1–1	0–0	2–0	2–0	0–0	1–1	1–0	1–0	2–0	0–1	2–0	2–0	1–1	0–0	2–0	1–0		2–0	1–0	2–2	1–0
Stevenage	2–1	2–1	1–0	0–0	3–2	1–0	5–1	0–1	1–0	1–0	1–2	3–0	1–1	2–1	2–1	0–2	1–0	1–0	1–0	4–2		2–2	1–3	2–3
Tranmere Rovers	3–0	1–1	1–4	0–1	1–1	0–2	2–3	2–3	1–2	1–1	0–1	0–0	2–1	0–0	2–1	0–3	0–1	3–1	2–1	1–2	2–2		1–2	1–1
Wycombe Wanderers	2–2	2–0	1–3	0–0	1–0	3–1	2–1	1–1	2–1	1–0	1–1	2–1	0–1	1–2	1–1	2–3	0–2	0–0	1–0	4–1	2–2	0–2		1–0
York City	1–0	2–3	1–1	0–1	2–2	0–0	1–0	0–2	0–0	1–0	0–0	1–1	2–1	0–2	1–1	0–1	0–0	0–0	0–1	2–3	0–2	2–0	0–0	

Updated to match(es) played on 25 April 2015. Source: BBC Sport
Legend: Blue = home team win; Yellow = draw; Red = away team win.

== Managerial changes ==
Team	Outgoing manager	Manner of departure	Date of vacancy	Position in table at time of departure	Incoming manager	Date of appointment	Position in table at time of appointment
Nottingham Forest	Billy Davies	Sacked	24 March 2014	2013–14 season	Stuart Pearce	3 April 2014	Pre-season
Tranmere Rovers	Ronnie Moore	Sacked	9 April 2014	2013–14 season	Robert Edwards	27 May 2014	Pre-season
Blackpool	Barry Ferguson	End of Contract	9 May 2014	Pre-season	José Riga	11 June 2014	Pre-season
Shrewsbury Town	Michael Jackson	Appointed as Assistant Manager	12 May 2014	Pre-season	Micky Mellon	12 May 2014	Pre-season
Brighton & Hove Albion	Óscar García Junyent	Resigned	12 May 2014	Pre-season	Sami Hyypia	6 June 2014	Pre-season
Charlton Athletic	José Riga	End of Contract	27 May 2014	Pre-season	Bob Peeters	27 May 2014	Pre-season
Leeds United	Brian McDermott	Mutual Consent	31 May 2014	Pre-season	Dave Hockaday	19 June 2014	Pre-season
Oxford United	Gary Waddock	Sacked	4 July 2014	Pre-season	Michael Appleton	4 July 2014	Pre-season
Huddersfield Town	Mark Robins	Mutual Consent	10 August 2014	24th	Chris Powell	3 September 2014	21st
Leeds United	Dave Hockaday	Sacked	28 August 2014	21st	Darko Milanič	23 September 2014	12th
Watford	Giuseppe Sannino	Resigned	31 August 2014	2nd	Óscar García Junyent	2 September 2014	2nd
Carlisle United	Graham Kavanagh	Sacked	1 September 2014	22nd	Keith Curle	19 September 2014	24th
Colchester United	Joe Dunne	Sacked	1 September 2014	23rd	Tony Humes	1 September 2014	23rd
Accrington Stanley	James Beattie	Mutual Consent	12 September 2014	21st	John Coleman	18 September 2014	20th
Port Vale	Micky Adams	Resigned	18 September 2014	23rd	Rob Page	29 October 2014	16th
Cardiff City	Ole Gunnar Solskjær	Resigned	18 September 2014	17th	Russell Slade	6 October 2014	15th
Fulham	Felix Magath	Sacked	18 September 2014	24th	Kit Symons	29 October 2014	20th
Leyton Orient	Russell Slade	Resigned	24 September 2014	17th	Mauro Milanese	26 October 2014	18th
Watford	Óscar García Junyent	Resigned	29 September 2014	4th	Billy McKinlay	29 September 2014	4th
Bolton Wanderers	Dougie Freedman	Mutual Consent	3 October 2014	23rd	Neil Lennon	12 October 2014	24th
Hartlepool United	Colin Cooper	Resigned	4 October 2014	24th	Paul Murray	23 October 2014	23rd
Watford	Billy McKinlay	Sacked	7 October 2014	3rd	Slaviša Jokanović	7 October 2014	3rd
Scunthorpe United	Russ Wilcox	Sacked	8 October 2014	23rd	Mark Robins	13 October 2014	23rd
Tranmere Rovers	Robert Edwards	Sacked	13 October 2014	24th	Micky Adams	16 October 2014	24th
York City	Nigel Worthington	Resigned	13 October 2014	22nd	Russ Wilcox	15 October 2014	22nd
Birmingham City	Lee Clark	Sacked	20 October 2014	21st	Gary Rowett	27 October 2014	23rd
Leeds United	Darko Milanič	Sacked	25 October 2014	18th	Neil Redfearn	1 November 2014	19th
Burton Albion	Gary Rowett	Signed by Birmingham City	27 October 2014	3rd	Jimmy Floyd Hasselbaink	13 November 2014	5th
Blackpool	José Riga	Sacked	27 October 2014	24th	Lee Clark	30 October 2014	24th
Wigan Athletic	Uwe Rösler	Sacked	13 November 2014	22nd	Malky Mackay	19 November 2014	22nd
Mansfield Town	Paul Cox	Mutual Consent	21 November 2014	19th	Adam Murray	5 December 2014	18th
Cheltenham Town	Mark Yates	Sacked	25 November 2014	18th	Paul Buckle	26 November 2014	18th
Hartlepool United	Paul Murray	Sacked	6 December 2014	24th	Ronnie Moore	16 December 2014	24th
Leyton Orient	Mauro Milanese	Sacked	8 December 2014	19th	Fabio Liverani	8 December 2014	19th
Reading	Nigel Adkins	Sacked	15 December 2014	16th	Steve Clarke	16 December 2014	16th
Brighton & Hove Albion	Sami Hyypia	Resigned	22 December 2014	22nd	Chris Hughton	31 December 2014	22nd
Crawley Town	John Gregory	Health Reasons	27 December 2014	21st	Dean Saunders	27 December 2014	21st
Gillingham	Peter Taylor	Sacked	31 December 2014	20th	Justin Edinburgh	7 February 2015	18th
Norwich City	Neil Adams	Resigned	5 January 2015	7th	Alex Neil	9 January 2015	7th
Charlton Athletic	Bob Peeters	Sacked	11 January 2015	14th	Guy Luzon	13 January 2015	14th
Nottingham Forest	Stuart Pearce	Sacked	1 February 2015	12th	Dougie Freedman	1 February 2015	12th
Yeovil Town	Gary Johnson	Sacked	4 February 2015	24th	Paul Sturrock	9 April 2015	24th
Newport County	Justin Edinburgh	Signed by Gillingham	7 February 2015	6th	Terry Butcher	30 April 2015	2015–16 season
Barnsley	Danny Wilson	Sacked	12 February 2015	17th	Lee Johnson	25 February 2015	16th
Cheltenham Town	Paul Buckle	Mutual Consent	13 February 2015	22nd	Gary Johnson	30 March 2015	24th
Peterborough United	Darren Ferguson	Resigned	21 February 2015	15th	Dave Robertson	22 May 2015	2015–16 season
Coventry City	Steven Pressley	Sacked	23 February 2015	21st	Tony Mowbray	3 March 2015	20th
Oldham Athletic	Lee Johnson	Signed by Barnsley	25 February 2015	9th	Darren Kelly	1 June 2015	2015–16 season
Millwall	Ian Holloway	Sacked	10 March 2015	23rd	Neil Harris	29 April 2015	22nd
Notts County	Shaun Derry	Sacked	23 March 2015	20th	Ricardo Moniz	7 April 2015	22nd
Wigan Athletic	Malky Mackay	Sacked	6 April 2015	23rd	Gary Caldwell	7 April 2015	23rd
Portsmouth	Andy Awford	Resigned	13 April 2015	14th	Paul Cook	12 May 2015	2015–16 season
Tranmere Rovers	Micky Adams	Mutual Consent	19 April 2015	24th	Gary Brabin	5 May 2015	2015–16 season
