= Colchester United F.C. league record by opponent =

Colchester United Football Club is an English professional football club based in Colchester, Essex, that was founded in 1937. From the 1937–38 season, the club played in the Southern Football League until 1950, when they were elected to the Football League. After playing in the Third Division South for eight seasons, Colchester remained in the Third Division when the league was re-organised by finishing 12th in 1958. The club were relegated to the Fourth Division in 1961, but made an immediate return to the Third Division after finishing the 1961–62 season in second position, one point behind Millwall. They bounced between the Third and Fourth divisions until 1990, when the club were relegated from the Football League for the first time in 40 years. After two seasons in the Football Conference, the U's were promoted back to the Football League after winning the Conference title on goal difference over Wycombe Wanderers in 1992. Colchester played in the Third Division between 1992 and 1998, when they won promotion to the Second Division after a play-off final win against Torquay United at Wembley. The club remained in the third tier until 2006, as they were promoted to the Championship, the second tier of English football, for the first time in their history, ending the season as runners up in League One to Southend United. The U's spent two seasons in the Championship, earning their highest-ever league finish of 10th position in the second tier before being relegated back to League One in 2008. Following relegation to League Two at the end of the 2015–16 season, Colchester made a return to the fourth tier of English football for the first time in 18-years.

Colchester United's first team have competed in leagues in five different tiers of English football, and their record against each club faced in those competitions is summarised below. Colchester's first ever league game was contested on 28 August 1937 in the Southern League against Yeovil & Petters United. Their first Football League encounter came against Gillingham on 19 August 1950 in the Third Division South. The club met their 150th different league rivals in the 2020–21 season, when they faced Harrogate Town in League Two. Colchester have met Swindon Town 81 times in the Football League and Southern League, more than any other team. They have also recorded more league victories against Swindon, beating them 31 times, while the greatest number of draws have come against Gillingham, with 24 matches drawn in 76 meetings. Exeter City and Peterborough United have defeated Colchester more times than any other teams, recording 31 victories in 78 and 70 encounters respectively. Colchester United hold a 100% win record against four different clubs; Boston United, Folkestone Town, Gateshead and Slough Town. Only Accrington Stanley (reformed), Burton Albion, Manchester City and Middlesbrough have a 100% win record against the U's.

== Key ==
- † Clubs with this background and symbol in the "Opponent" column are Colchester United's divisional rivals in the 2018–19 season.
- ‡ Clubs with this background and symbol in the "Opponent" column are defunct. (Note: Reserve teams Colchester United played in the Southern League are classed as defunct in that they no longer compete in the English football league system.)
- The table includes results of matches played by Colchester United in the Southern Football League, Football League and the Football Conference. Play-off and wartime competition matches are excluded.
- The name used for each opponent is the name they used when Colchester United most recently played a league match against them. Results against each opponent include results against that club under any former name. For example, results against Yeovil Town include matches played against Yeovil & Petters United.
- P = matches played; W = matches won; D = matches drawn; L = matches lost; Win% = percentage of total matches won
- The columns headed "First" and "Last" contain the first and most recent seasons in which Colchester United played league matches against each opponent.

== All-time league record ==
Statistics are correct as of the match played on 26 November 2021.

Colchester United F.C. league record by opponent
| Opponent | P | W | D | L | P | W | D | L | P | W | D | L | Win% | First | Last | Ref |
| Opponent | Home | | | | Away | | | | Total | | | | Win% | First | Last | Ref |
|---|---|---|---|---|---|---|---|---|---|---|---|---|---|---|---|---|
| Accrington Stanley ‡ | 3 | 3 | 0 | 0 | 3 | 2 | 1 | 0 | 6 | 5 | 1 | 0 | 83.33 | 1958–59 | 1961–62 | |
| Accrington Stanley | 2 | 0 | 0 | 2 | 2 | 0 | 0 | 2 | 4 | 0 | 0 | 4 | 0.00 | 2016–17 | 2017–18 | |
| Aldershot ‡ | 25 | 14 | 7 | 4 | 25 | 6 | 8 | 11 | 50 | 20 | 15 | 15 | 40.00 | 1950–51 | 1989–90 | |
| Aldershot Reserves ‡ | 2 | 2 | 0 | 0 | 2 | 1 | 1 | 0 | 4 | 3 | 1 | 0 | 75.00 | 1937–38 | 1938–39 | |
| Altrincham | 2 | 0 | 2 | 0 | 2 | 1 | 1 | 0 | 4 | 1 | 3 | 0 | 25.00 | 1990–91 | 1991–92 | |
| Arsenal 'A' ‡ | 1 | 1 | 0 | 0 | 1 | 0 | 1 | 0 | 2 | 1 | 1 | 0 | 50.00 | 1938–39 | 1938–39 | |
| Barnet | 8 | 3 | 3 | 2 | 8 | 4 | 2 | 2 | 16 | 7 | 5 | 4 | 43.75 | 1990–91 | 2017–18 | |
| Barnsley | 19 | 8 | 7 | 4 | 19 | 6 | 5 | 8 | 38 | 14 | 12 | 12 | 36.84 | 1959–60 | 2015–16 | |
| Barrow † | 8 | 4 | 3 | 1 | 9 | 2 | 4 | 3 | 17 | 6 | 7 | 4 | 35.29 | 1961–62 | 2021–22 | |
| Barry Town (Note: Barry Town statistics include matches played against Barry.) | 7 | 7 | 0 | 0 | 7 | 2 | 2 | 3 | 14 | 9 | 2 | 3 | 64.29 | 1937–38 | 1949–50 | |
| Bath City | 9 | 8 | 1 | 0 | 9 | 4 | 4 | 1 | 18 | 12 | 5 | 1 | 66.67 | 1937–38 | 1991–92 | |
| Bedford Town | 5 | 3 | 1 | 1 | 5 | 3 | 0 | 2 | 10 | 6 | 1 | 3 | 60.00 | 1945–46 | 1949–50 | |
| Birmingham City | 1 | 0 | 1 | 0 | 1 | 0 | 0 | 1 | 2 | 0 | 1 | 1 | 0.00 | 2006–07 | 2006–07 | |
| Blackburn Rovers | 2 | 1 | 0 | 1 | 2 | 0 | 0 | 2 | 4 | 1 | 0 | 3 | 25.00 | 1974–75 | 1979–80 | |
| Blackpool | 17 | 8 | 6 | 3 | 17 | 3 | 8 | 6 | 34 | 11 | 14 | 9 | 32.35 | 1978–79 | 2016–17 | |
| Bolton Wanderers | 2 | 2 | 0 | 0 | 2 | 0 | 1 | 1 | 4 | 2 | 1 | 1 | 50.00 | 1987–88 | 2020–21 | |
| Boston United | 2 | 2 | 0 | 0 | 2 | 2 | 0 | 0 | 4 | 4 | 0 | 0 | 100.00 | 1990–91 | 1991–92 | |
| Bournemouth (Note: Bournemouth statistics include matches played against Bournemouth & Boscombe Athletic.) | 30 | 16 | 6 | 8 | 30 | 6 | 12 | 12 | 60 | 22 | 18 | 20 | 36.67 | 1950–51 | 2012–13 | |
| Bradford City † | 18 | 8 | 5 | 5 | 17 | 5 | 8 | 4 | 35 | 13 | 13 | 9 | 37.14 | 1958–59 | 2020–21 | |
| Bradford Park Avenue | 4 | 3 | 0 | 1 | 4 | 1 | 1 | 2 | 8 | 4 | 1 | 3 | 50.00 | 1962–63 | 1969–70 | |
| Brentford | 30 | 11 | 8 | 11 | 30 | 3 | 9 | 18 | 60 | 14 | 17 | 29 | 23.33 | 1954–55 | 2013–14 | |
| Brighton & Hove Albion | 20 | 7 | 9 | 4 | 20 | 2 | 7 | 11 | 40 | 9 | 16 | 15 | 22.50 | 1950–51 | 2010–11 | |
| Bristol City | 21 | 8 | 6 | 7 | 21 | 4 | 7 | 10 | 42 | 12 | 13 | 17 | 28.57 | 1950–51 | 2014–15 | |
| Bristol Rovers † | 15 | 8 | 3 | 4 | 14 | 1 | 5 | 8 | 29 | 9 | 8 | 12 | 31.03 | 1950–51 | 2021–22 | |
| Bristol Rovers Reserves ‡ | 2 | 2 | 0 | 0 | 2 | 1 | 0 | 1 | 4 | 3 | 0 | 1 | 75.00 | 1937–38 | 1938–39 | |
| Burnley | 10 | 2 | 3 | 5 | 10 | 3 | 2 | 5 | 20 | 5 | 5 | 10 | 25.00 | 1980–81 | 2007–08 | |
| Burton Albion | 1 | 0 | 0 | 1 | 1 | 0 | 0 | 1 | 2 | 0 | 0 | 2 | 0.00 | 2015–16 | 2015–16 | |
| Bury ‡ | 27 | 13 | 8 | 6 | 27 | 4 | 8 | 15 | 54 | 17 | 16 | 21 | 31.48 | 1958–59 | 2018–19 | |
| Cambridge United | 21 | 10 | 5 | 6 | 21 | 5 | 1 | 15 | 42 | 15 | 6 | 21 | 35.71 | 1970–71 | 2020–21 | |
| Cardiff City | 12 | 6 | 2 | 4 | 12 | 5 | 2 | 5 | 24 | 11 | 4 | 9 | 45.83 | 1975–76 | 2007–08 | |
| Cardiff City Reserves ‡ | 2 | 2 | 0 | 0 | 2 | 0 | 1 | 1 | 4 | 2 | 1 | 1 | 50.00 | 1938–39 | 1945–46 | |
| Carlisle United † | 25 | 14 | 8 | 3 | 26 | 7 | 4 | 15 | 51 | 21 | 12 | 18 | 41.18 | 1961–62 | 2021–22 | |
| Charlton Athletic | 6 | 3 | 2 | 1 | 6 | 3 | 0 | 3 | 12 | 6 | 2 | 4 | 50.00 | 1974–75 | 2011–12 | |
| Chelmsford City | 7 | 4 | 1 | 2 | 6 | 1 | 2 | 3 | 13 | 5 | 3 | 5 | 38.46 | 1938–39 | 1949–50 | |
| Cheltenham Town | 16 | 8 | 5 | 3 | 16 | 5 | 5 | 6 | 32 | 13 | 10 | 9 | 40.63 | 1937–38 | 2020–21 | |
| Chester City ‡ | 21 | 8 | 8 | 5 | 21 | 4 | 5 | 12 | 42 | 12 | 13 | 17 | 28.57 | 1961–62 | 1997–98 | |
| Chesterfield | 30 | 17 | 5 | 8 | 30 | 8 | 12 | 10 | 60 | 25 | 17 | 18 | 41.67 | 1958–59 | 2017–18 | |
| Chingford Town | 2 | 2 | 0 | 0 | 2 | 1 | 0 | 1 | 4 | 3 | 0 | 1 | 75.00 | 1948–49 | 1949–50 | |
| Coventry City | 17 | 7 | 3 | 7 | 17 | 2 | 5 | 10 | 34 | 9 | 8 | 17 | 26.47 | 1952–53 | 2017–18 | |
| Crawley Town † | 9 | 2 | 4 | 3 | 8 | 1 | 2 | 5 | 17 | 3 | 6 | 8 | 17.65 | 2012–13 | 2021–22 | |
| Crewe Alexandra | 28 | 17 | 2 | 9 | 29 | 11 | 7 | 11 | 57 | 28 | 9 | 20 | 49.12 | 1961–62 | 2019–20 | |
| Crystal Palace | 14 | 4 | 4 | 6 | 14 | 5 | 5 | 4 | 28 | 9 | 9 | 10 | 32.14 | 1950–51 | 2007–08 | |
| Dagenham & Redbridge (Note: Dagenham & Redbridge statistics include matches played against Redbridge Forest.) | 1 | 0 | 1 | 0 | 1 | 0 | 0 | 1 | 2 | 0 | 1 | 1 | 0.00 | 2010–11 | 2010–11 | |
| Darlington ‡ | 22 | 12 | 3 | 7 | 22 | 7 | 4 | 11 | 44 | 19 | 7 | 18 | 43.18 | 1961–62 | 1997–98 | |
| Dartford | 6 | 5 | 0 | 1 | 6 | 1 | 1 | 4 | 12 | 6 | 1 | 5 | 50.00 | 1937–38 | 1949–50 | |
| Derby County | 1 | 1 | 0 | 0 | 1 | 0 | 0 | 1 | 2 | 1 | 0 | 1 | 50.00 | 2006–07 | 2006–07 | |
| Doncaster Rovers | 24 | 14 | 4 | 6 | 24 | 4 | 4 | 16 | 48 | 18 | 8 | 22 | 37.50 | 1958–59 | 2016–17 | |
| Gravesend & Northfleet | 4 | 1 | 2 | 1 | 4 | 2 | 0 | 2 | 8 | 3 | 2 | 3 | 37.50 | 1946–47 | 1949–50 | |
| Exeter City † | 40 | 19 | 10 | 11 | 39 | 7 | 12 | 20 | 79 | 26 | 22 | 31 | 32.91 | 1950–51 | 2021–22 | |
| Exeter City Reserves ‡ | 6 | 6 | 0 | 0 | 6 | 1 | 1 | 4 | 12 | 7 | 1 | 4 | 58.33 | 1937–38 | 1949–50 | |
| Farnborough Town | 1 | 0 | 0 | 1 | 1 | 1 | 0 | 0 | 2 | 1 | 0 | 1 | 50.00 | 1991–92 | 1991–92 | |
| Fisher Athletic | 1 | 1 | 0 | 0 | 1 | 0 | 1 | 0 | 2 | 1 | 1 | 0 | 50.00 | 1990–91 | 1990–91 | |
| Fleetwood Town | 2 | 1 | 1 | 0 | 2 | 1 | 0 | 1 | 4 | 2 | 1 | 1 | 50.00 | 2014–15 | 2015–16 | |
| Folkestone Town ‡ | 2 | 2 | 0 | 0 | 2 | 2 | 0 | 0 | 4 | 4 | 0 | 0 | 100.00 | 1937–38 | 1938–39 | |
| Forest Green Rovers † | 4 | 2 | 0 | 2 | 3 | 2 | 0 | 1 | 7 | 4 | 0 | 3 | 57.14 | 2017–18 | 2020–21 | |
| Fulham | 5 | 3 | 1 | 1 | 5 | 1 | 1 | 3 | 10 | 4 | 2 | 4 | 40.00 | 1980–81 | 1998–99 | |
| Gateshead | 2 | 2 | 0 | 0 | 2 | 2 | 0 | 0 | 4 | 4 | 0 | 0 | 100.00 | 1990–91 | 1991–92 | |
| Gillingham | 38 | 18 | 14 | 6 | 38 | 11 | 10 | 17 | 76 | 29 | 24 | 23 | 38.16 | 1938–39 | 2015–16 | |
| Gloucester City | 4 | 2 | 1 | 1 | 4 | 3 | 0 | 1 | 8 | 5 | 1 | 2 | 62.50 | 1946–47 | 1949–50 | |
| Grimsby Town | 20 | 12 | 4 | 4 | 20 | 4 | 6 | 10 | 40 | 16 | 10 | 14 | 40.00 | 1959–60 | 2020–21 | |
| Guildford City | 6 | 4 | 1 | 1 | 6 | 1 | 1 | 4 | 12 | 5 | 2 | 5 | 41.67 | 1937–38 | 1949–50 | |
| Halifax Town ‡ | 19 | 13 | 4 | 2 | 19 | 5 | 7 | 17 | 38 | 18 | 11 | 9 | 47.37 | 1958–59 | 1992–93 | |
| Harrogate Town † | 2 | 2 | 0 | 0 | 1 | 0 | 0 | 1 | 3 | 2 | 0 | 1 | 66.67 | 2020–21 | 2021–22 | |
| Hartlepool United † (Note: Hartlepool United statistics include matches played against Hartlepools United and Hartlepool.) | 30 | 19 | 7 | 4 | 30 | 7 | 8 | 15 | 60 | 26 | 15 | 19 | 43.33 | 1961–62 | 2016–17 | |
| Hastings United ‡ | 2 | 2 | 0 | 0 | 2 | 1 | 0 | 1 | 4 | 3 | 0 | 1 | 75.00 | 1948–49 | 1949–50 | |
| Hereford United | 24 | 13 | 7 | 4 | 24 | 4 | 8 | 12 | 48 | 17 | 15 | 16 | 35.42 | 1945–46 | 2008–09 | |
| Huddersfield Town | 11 | 4 | 5 | 2 | 11 | 0 | 5 | 6 | 22 | 4 | 10 | 8 | 18.18 | 1974–75 | 2011–12 | |
| Hull City | 15 | 6 | 4 | 5 | 15 | 4 | 5 | 6 | 30 | 10 | 9 | 11 | 33.33 | 1958–59 | 2007–08 | |
| Ipswich Town | 9 | 3 | 4 | 2 | 9 | 1 | 1 | 7 | 18 | 4 | 5 | 9 | 22.22 | 1937–38 | 2007–08 | |
| Ipswich Town Reserves ‡ | 2 | 1 | 1 | 0 | 1 | 1 | 0 | 0 | 3 | 2 | 1 | 0 | 66.67 | 1938–39 | 1939–40 | |
| Kettering Town | 2 | 2 | 0 | 0 | 2 | 0 | 1 | 1 | 4 | 2 | 1 | 1 | 50.00 | 1990–91 | 1991–92 | |
| Kidderminster Harriers | 4 | 4 | 0 | 0 | 4 | 1 | 3 | 0 | 8 | 5 | 3 | 0 | 62.50 | 1948–49 | 1991–92 | |
| Leicester City | 3 | 0 | 2 | 1 | 3 | 0 | 3 | 0 | 6 | 0 | 5 | 1 | 0.00 | 2006–07 | 2008–09 | |
| Leeds United | 3 | 1 | 0 | 2 | 3 | 1 | 0 | 2 | 6 | 2 | 0 | 4 | 33.33 | 2006–07 | 2009–10 | |
| Leyton Orient † (Note: Leyton Orient statistics include matches played against Orient.) | 25 | 14 | 8 | 3 | 25 | 9 | 6 | 10 | 50 | 23 | 14 | 13 | 46.00 | 1950–51 | 2020–21 | |
| Lincoln City | 21 | 12 | 3 | 6 | 21 | 6 | 7 | 8 | 42 | 18 | 10 | 14 | 42.86 | 1965–66 | 2018–19 | |
| Lovell's Athletic ‡ | 3 | 2 | 0 | 1 | 3 | 1 | 2 | 0 | 6 | 3 | 2 | 1 | 50.00 | 1947–48 | 1949–50 | |
| Luton Town | 12 | 5 | 5 | 2 | 12 | 3 | 3 | 6 | 24 | 8 | 8 | 8 | 33.33 | 1963–64 | 2017–18 | |
| Macclesfield Town | 6 | 5 | 1 | 0 | 6 | 0 | 4 | 2 | 12 | 5 | 5 | 2 | 41.67 | 1990–91 | 2019–20 | |
| Maidstone United ‡ | 1 | 1 | 0 | 0 | 1 | 0 | 0 | 1 | 2 | 1 | 0 | 1 | 50.00 | 1989–90 | 1989–90 | |
| Manchester City | 1 | 0 | 0 | 1 | 1 | 0 | 0 | 1 | 2 | 0 | 0 | 2 | 0.00 | 1998–99 | 1998–99 | |
| Mansfield Town † | 28 | 14 | 7 | 7 | 28 | 7 | 14 | 7 | 56 | 21 | 21 | 14 | 37.50 | 1958–59 | 2021–22 | |
| Merthyr Tydfil ‡ | 6 | 5 | 1 | 0 | 6 | 0 | 1 | 5 | 12 | 5 | 2 | 5 | 41.67 | 1946–47 | 1991–92 | |
| Middlesbrough | 1 | 0 | 0 | 1 | 1 | 0 | 0 | 1 | 2 | 0 | 0 | 2 | 0.00 | 1966–67 | 1966–67 | |
| Millwall | 20 | 6 | 6 | 8 | 20 | 5 | 3 | 12 | 40 | 11 | 9 | 20 | 27.50 | 1950–51 | 2015–16 | |
| Millwall Reserves ‡ | 1 | 1 | 0 | 0 | 1 | 0 | 1 | 0 | 2 | 1 | 1 | 0 | 50.00 | 1938–39 | 1946–47 | |
| Milton Keynes Dons (Note: Wimbledon relocated to Milton Keynes in 2003, and were rebranded as Milton Keynes Dons F.C. a year later. That club renounced all claims to Wimbledon's history in 2007, since when it has regarded itself as a new club founded in 2004.) | 10 | 4 | 0 | 6 | 10 | 1 | 4 | 5 | 20 | 5 | 4 | 11 | 25.00 | 2004–05 | 2018–19 | |
| Morecambe | 5 | 0 | 3 | 2 | 5 | 1 | 3 | 1 | 10 | 1 | 6 | 3 | 10.00 | 2016–17 | 2020–21 | |
| Newport County † | 27 | 15 | 9 | 3 | 25 | 8 | 5 | 12 | 52 | 23 | 14 | 15 | 44.23 | 1950–51 | 2021–22 | |
| Newport County Reserves ‡ | 2 | 2 | 0 | 0 | 2 | 1 | 1 | 0 | 4 | 3 | 1 | 0 | 75.00 | 1937–38 | 1938–39 | |
| Northampton Town † | 34 | 20 | 6 | 8 | 32 | 6 | 7 | 19 | 66 | 26 | 13 | 27 | 39.39 | 1950–51 | 2021–22 | |
| Northwich Victoria | 2 | 2 | 0 | 0 | 2 | 0 | 2 | 0 | 4 | 2 | 2 | 0 | 50.00 | 1990–91 | 1991–92 | |
| Norwich City | 13 | 5 | 3 | 5 | 13 | 4 | 4 | 5 | 26 | 9 | 7 | 10 | 34.62 | 1950–51 | 2009–10 | |
| Norwich City Reserves ‡ | 2 | 1 | 1 | 0 | 2 | 1 | 0 | 1 | 4 | 2 | 1 | 1 | 50.00 | 1937–38 | 1938–39 | |
| Nottingham Forest | 2 | 1 | 0 | 1 | 2 | 0 | 1 | 1 | 4 | 1 | 1 | 2 | 25.00 | 1950–51 | 2005–06 | |
| Notts County | 23 | 11 | 4 | 8 | 23 | 4 | 5 | 14 | 46 | 15 | 9 | 22 | 32.61 | 1958–59 | 2018–19 | |
| Oldham Athletic † | 25 | 8 | 10 | 7 | 27 | 7 | 11 | 9 | 52 | 15 | 21 | 16 | 28.85 | 1961–62 | 2021–22 | |
| Oxford United (Note: Oxford United statistics include matches played against Headington United.) | 9 | 4 | 2 | 3 | 9 | 3 | 2 | 4 | 18 | 7 | 4 | 7 | 38.89 | 1949–50 | 2000–01 | |
| Peterborough United | 35 | 17 | 9 | 9 | 35 | 9 | 4 | 22 | 70 | 26 | 13 | 31 | 37.14 | 1962–63 | 2015–16 | |
| Plymouth Argyle | 18 | 10 | 5 | 3 | 18 | 0 | 8 | 10 | 36 | 10 | 13 | 13 | 27.78 | 1950–51 | 2019–20 | |
| Plymouth Argyle Reserves ‡ | 3 | 1 | 0 | 2 | 2 | 1 | 0 | 1 | 5 | 2 | 0 | 3 | 40.00 | 1937–38 | 1939–40 | |
| Portsmouth | 4 | 2 | 1 | 1 | 4 | 1 | 1 | 2 | 8 | 3 | 2 | 3 | 37.50 | 1977–78 | 2016–17 | |
| Port Vale † | 31 | 18 | 5 | 8 | 32 | 6 | 11 | 15 | 63 | 24 | 16 | 23 | 38.10 | 1950–51 | 2021–22 | |
| Preston North End | 16 | 8 | 6 | 2 | 16 | 4 | 2 | 10 | 32 | 12 | 8 | 12 | 37.50 | 1974–75 | 2014–15 | |
| Queens Park Rangers | 18 | 10 | 3 | 5 | 18 | 2 | 4 | 12 | 36 | 12 | 7 | 17 | 33.33 | 1952–53 | 2007–08 | |
| Reading | 26 | 13 | 7 | 6 | 26 | 6 | 4 | 16 | 52 | 19 | 11 | 22 | 36.54 | 1950–51 | 2001–02 | |
| Redbridge Forest ‡ | 1 | 1 | 0 | 0 | 1 | 0 | 0 | 1 | 2 | 1 | 0 | 1 | 50.00 | 1991–92 | 1991–92 | |
| Rochdale † | 24 | 12 | 7 | 5 | 25 | 6 | 11 | 8 | 49 | 18 | 18 | 13 | 36.73 | 1958–59 | 2021–22 | |
| Rotherham United | 11 | 2 | 7 | 2 | 11 | 1 | 2 | 8 | 22 | 3 | 9 | 10 | 13.64 | 1973–74 | 2013–14 | |
| Runcorn ‡ | 2 | 1 | 1 | 0 | 2 | 2 | 0 | 0 | 4 | 3 | 1 | 0 | 75.00 | 1990–91 | 1991–92 | |
| Rushden & Diamonds ‡ | 1 | 1 | 0 | 0 | 1 | 0 | 0 | 1 | 2 | 1 | 0 | 1 | 50.00 | 2003–04 | 2003–04 | |
| Salford City † | 3 | 2 | 0 | 1 | 2 | 1 | 1 | 0 | 5 | 3 | 1 | 1 | 60.00 | 2019–20 | 2021–22 | |
| Scarborough ‡ | 9 | 3 | 2 | 4 | 9 | 3 | 5 | 1 | 18 | 6 | 7 | 5 | 33.33 | 1987–88 | 1997–98 | |
| Scunthorpe United † | 33 | 14 | 10 | 9 | 33 | 4 | 12 | 17 | 66 | 18 | 22 | 26 | 27.27 | 1964–65 | 2021–22 | |
| Sheffield United | 9 | 2 | 4 | 3 | 9 | 2 | 2 | 5 | 18 | 4 | 6 | 8 | 22.22 | 1979–80 | 2015–16 | |
| Sheffield Wednesday | 10 | 4 | 5 | 1 | 10 | 4 | 1 | 5 | 20 | 8 | 6 | 6 | 40.00 | 1975–76 | 2011–12 | |
| Shrewsbury Town | 23 | 11 | 7 | 5 | 23 | 3 | 4 | 15 | 46 | 14 | 12 | 20 | 30.43 | 1951–52 | 2015–16 | |
| Slough Town | 2 | 2 | 0 | 0 | 2 | 2 | 0 | 0 | 4 | 4 | 0 | 0 | 100.00 | 1990–91 | 1991–92 | |
| Southampton | 11 | 5 | 2 | 4 | 11 | 2 | 3 | 6 | 22 | 7 | 5 | 10 | 31.82 | 1953–54 | 2010–11 | |
| Southend United | 33 | 15 | 6 | 12 | 33 | 9 | 8 | 16 | 66 | 24 | 14 | 28 | 36.36 | 1950–51 | 2020–21 | |
| Southport | 7 | 5 | 2 | 0 | 7 | 3 | 0 | 4 | 14 | 8 | 2 | 4 | 57.14 | 1961–62 | 1976–77 | |
| Stafford Rangers | 2 | 2 | 0 | 0 | 2 | 1 | 1 | 0 | 4 | 3 | 1 | 0 | 75.00 | 1990–91 | 1991–92 | |
| Stevenage † | 8 | 5 | 1 | 2 | 9 | 4 | 3 | 2 | 17 | 9 | 4 | 4 | 52.94 | 2011–12 | 2021–22 | |
| Stockport County | 23 | 17 | 4 | 2 | 23 | 6 | 11 | 6 | 46 | 23 | 15 | 8 | 50.00 | 1958–59 | 2009–10 | |
| Stoke City | 6 | 2 | 0 | 4 | 6 | 0 | 2 | 4 | 12 | 2 | 2 | 8 | 16.67 | 1998–99 | 2007–08 | |
| Sunderland | 1 | 1 | 0 | 0 | 1 | 0 | 0 | 1 | 2 | 1 | 0 | 1 | 50.00 | 2006–07 | 2006–07 | |
| Sutton United † | 2 | 1 | 0 | 1 | 1 | 1 | 0 | 0 | 3 | 2 | 0 | 1 | 66.67 | 1990–91 | 2021–22 | |
| Swansea City (Note: Swansea City statistics include matches played against Swansea Town.) | 12 | 6 | 3 | 3 | 12 | 4 | 2 | 6 | 24 | 10 | 5 | 9 | 41.67 | 1966–67 | 2005–06 | |
| Swindon Town † | 40 | 20 | 9 | 11 | 41 | 11 | 11 | 19 | 81 | 31 | 20 | 30 | 38.27 | 1950–51 | 2021–22 | |
| Swindon Town Reserves ‡ | 3 | 3 | 0 | 0 | 3 | 1 | 0 | 2 | 10 | 7 | 3 | 0 | 70.00 | 1937–38 | 1945–46 | |
| Telford United ‡ | 2 | 2 | 0 | 0 | 2 | 1 | 0 | 1 | 4 | 3 | 0 | 1 | 75.00 | 1990–91 | 1991–92 | |
| Tonbridge Angels | 2 | 2 | 0 | 0 | 2 | 1 | 1 | 0 | 4 | 3 | 1 | 0 | 75.00 | 1948–49 | 1949–50 | |
| Torquay United | 31 | 18 | 6 | 7 | 31 | 8 | 9 | 14 | 62 | 26 | 15 | 21 | 41.94 | 1950–51 | 2004–05 | |
| Torquay United Reserves ‡ | 5 | 4 | 1 | 0 | 5 | 3 | 2 | 0 | 10 | 7 | 3 | 0 | 70.00 | 1937–38 | 1949–50 | |
| Tranmere Rovers † | 30 | 11 | 9 | 10 | 31 | 6 | 12 | 13 | 61 | 17 | 21 | 23 | 27.87 | 1958–59 | 2021–22 | |
| Tunbridge Wells Rangers | 2 | 1 | 1 | 0 | 2 | 1 | 0 | 1 | 4 | 2 | 1 | 1 | 50.00 | 1937–38 | 1938–39 | |
| Walsall † | 35 | 16 | 12 | 7 | 34 | 9 | 8 | 17 | 69 | 25 | 20 | 24 | 36.23 | 1950–51 | 2020–21 | |
| Watford | 18 | 9 | 5 | 4 | 18 | 3 | 8 | 7 | 36 | 12 | 13 | 11 | 33.33 | 1950–51 | 2007–08 | |
| Welling United | 2 | 2 | 0 | 0 | 2 | 0 | 1 | 1 | 4 | 2 | 1 | 1 | 50.00 | 1990–91 | 1991–92 | |
| West Bromwich Albion | 2 | 1 | 0 | 1 | 2 | 0 | 0 | 2 | 4 | 1 | 0 | 3 | 25.00 | 2006–07 | 2007–08 | |
| Weymouth | 1 | 1 | 0 | 0 | 1 | 0 | 1 | 0 | 2 | 1 | 1 | 0 | 50.00 | 1949–50 | 1949–50 | |
| Wigan Athletic | 11 | 4 | 3 | 4 | 11 | 4 | 1 | 6 | 22 | 8 | 4 | 10 | 36.36 | 1981–82 | 2015–16 | |
| Wimbledon ‡ | 2 | 2 | 0 | 0 | 2 | 0 | 1 | 1 | 4 | 2 | 1 | 1 | 50.00 | 1979–80 | 1982–83 | |
| Witton Albion | 1 | 1 | 0 | 0 | 1 | 0 | 1 | 0 | 2 | 1 | 1 | 0 | 50.00 | 1991–92 | 1991–92 | |
| Wolverhampton Wanderers | 5 | 2 | 0 | 3 | 5 | 0 | 0 | 5 | 10 | 2 | 0 | 8 | 20.00 | 1986–87 | 2013–14 | |
| Worcester City | 6 | 4 | 1 | 1 | 6 | 3 | 0 | 3 | 12 | 7 | 1 | 4 | 58.33 | 1938–39 | 1949–50 | |
| Workington | 10 | 7 | 3 | 0 | 10 | 4 | 2 | 4 | 20 | 11 | 5 | 4 | 55.00 | 1961–62 | 1976–77 | |
| Wrexham | 25 | 10 | 8 | 7 | 25 | 7 | 7 | 11 | 50 | 17 | 15 | 18 | 34.00 | 1958–59 | 2004–05 | |
| Wycombe Wanderers | 13 | 4 | 6 | 3 | 13 | 4 | 6 | 3 | 26 | 8 | 12 | 6 | 30.77 | 1990–91 | 2017–18 | |
| Yeovil Town (Note: Yeovil Town statistics include matches played against Yeovil & Petters United.) | 19 | 12 | 5 | 2 | 19 | 6 | 3 | 10 | 38 | 18 | 8 | 12 | 47.37 | 1937–38 | 2018–19 | |
| York City | 12 | 7 | 3 | 2 | 12 | 2 | 1 | 9 | 24 | 9 | 4 | 11 | 37.50 | 1959–60 | 1998–99 | |
