= 1938–39 Welsh Cup =

Tournament details
- Country: Wales
- Teams: 61

Final positions
- Champions: (England) South Liverpool
- Runners-up: (Wales) Cardiff City

Tournament statistics
- Matches played: 66
- Goals scored: 330 (5 per match)

The 1938–39 FAW Welsh Cup is the 58th season of the annual knockout tournament for competitive football teams in Wales.

== Key ==
League name pointed after clubs name.

- B&DL - Birmingham & District League
- CCL - Cheshire County League
- FL D2 - Football League Second Division
- FL D3N - Football League Third Division North
- FL D3S - Football League Third Division South
- LC - Lancashire Combination
- MWL - Mid-Wales Football League
- ML - Midland League
- SFL - Southern Football League
- WLN - Welsh League North
- WLS D1 - Welsh League South Division One
- WCL - West Cheshire League
- W&DL - Wrexham & District Amateur League

== First round ==
Tie no	Home	Score	Away
1	Llandudno (WLN)	4–1	Penrhyn Quarry (WLN)
2	Holyhead Town (WLN)	1–4	Caernarfon Town (WLN)
3	Cross Street Gwersyllt (W&DL)	6–0	Llangollen Town (W&DL)
4	Buckley Town	3–1	Flint Town (WCL)
5	Castle Firebrick Works (W&DL)	0–5	Druids (W&DL)
6	Gwersyllt (W&DL)	2–7	Flint Athletic
7	Llanerch Celts (W&DL)	2–1	Caergwrle (W&DL)
8	Mold Alexandra	2–5	Shotton Athletic
9	Llandrindod Wells	1–1	Llanidloes Town (MWL)
replay	Llanidloes Town (MWL)	6–2	Llandrindod Wells
10	Porthmadog (WLN)	6–3	Pwllheli (WLN)
11	Machynlleth (MWL)	4–2	Barmouth
12	Towyn (MWL)	0–4	Aberdovey (MWL)
13	Welshpool	9–1	Newtown (MWL)
14	Aberystwyth Town (MWL)	4–1	Trefechan
15	Blaenau Ffestiniog (WLN)	10–0	Dolgelley Albion
16	Caerphilly United	2–1	Pontypridd

== Second round ==
14 winners from the First round plus Llay United and Rhayader. Caerphilly United and Llanerch Celts get a bye to the Third round.

Tie no	Home	Score	Away
1	Porthmadog (WLN)	3–4	Llandudno (WLN)
2	Flint Athletic	1–1	Shotton Athletic
replay	Shotton Athletic	5–2	Flint Athletic
3	Blaenau Ffestiniog (WLN)	4–1	Caernarfon Town (WLN)
4	Machynlleth (MWL)	4–0	Aberdovey (MWL)
5	Llanidloes Town (MWL)	3–0	Aberystwyth Town (MWL)
6	Druids (W&DL)	0–3	Cross Street Gwersyllt (W&DL)
7	Rhayader (MWL)	1–2	Welshpool
8	Llay United	2–0	Buckley Town

== Third round ==
8 winners from the Second round, Caerphilly United and Llanerch Celts plus 16 new clubs.

Tie no	Home	Score	Away
1	Shotton Athletic	3–1	Blaenau Ffestiniog (WLN)
2	Llay United	0–4	Llanidloes Town (MWL)
3	Llanerch Celts (W&DL)	4–2	Machynlleth (MWL)
4	Oswestry Town (B&DL)	3–2	Llandudno (WLN)
5	Cross Street Gwersyllt (W&DL)	2–1	Welshpool
6	Hereford United (B&DL)	w/o	Kidderminster Harriers (B&DL)
7	Caerphilly United	2–4	Troedyrhiw (WLS D1)
8	Aberdare Town (WLS D1)	2–6	Aberaman (WLS D1)
9	Haverfordwest Athletic (WLS D1)	2–1	Llanelly
10	Barry (WLS D1 & SFL)	7–1	Cardiff Corinthians (WLS D1)
11	Caerau Athletic (WLS D1)	1–4	Gwynfi Welfare (WLS D1)
12	Milford United (WLS D1)	10–2	Caerphilly Town
13	Ebbw Vale (WLS D1)	2–2	Lovell's Athletic (WLS D1)
replay	Lovell's Athletic (WLS D1)	4–1	Ebbw Vale (WLS D1)

== Fourth round ==
12 winners from the Third round. Lovell's Athletic get a bye to the Fifth round.

Tie no	Home	Score	Away
1	Oswestry Town (B&DL)	5–1	Hereford United (B&DL)
2	Shotton Athletic	4–1	Cross Street Gwersyllt (W&DL)
3	Llanidloes Town (MWL)	5–0	Llanerch Celts (W&DL)
4	Haverfordwest Athletic (WLS D1)	3–2	Gwynfi Welfare (WLS D1)
5	Barry (WLS D1 & SFL)	w/o	Aberaman (WLS D1)
6	Milford United (WLS D1)	8–2	Troedyrhiw (WLS D1)

== Fifth round ==
Six winners from the Fourth round, Lovell's Athletic plus nine new clubs.

Tie no	Home	Score	Away
1	Wrexham (FL D3N)	9–0	Southport (FL D3N)
2	Bangor City (LC)	0–1*	New Brighton (FL D3N)
replay	Bangor City (LC)	2–0	New Brighton (FL D3N)
3	Cardiff City (FL D3S)	2–2	Swansea Town (FL D2)
replay	Swansea Town (FL D2)	1–4	Cardiff City (FL D3S)
4	Rhyl (CCL)	3–0	Shotton Athletic
5	Oswestry Town (B&DL)	2–0	Llanidloes Town (MWL)
6	South Liverpool (LC)	2–1	Shrewsbury Town (ML)
7	Haverfordwest Athletic (WLS D1)	2–3	Milford United (WLS D1)
8	Barry (WLS D1 & SFL)	2–0	Lovell's Athletic (WLS D1)

== Sixth round ==
Eight winners from the Fifth round plus Chester and Newport County.

Tie no	Home	Score	Away
1	Chester (FL D3N)	4–0	Rhyl (CCL)
2	Cardiff City (FL D3S)	5–1	Newport County (FL D3S)
3	South Liverpool (LC)	8–1	Bangor City (LC)
4	Barry (WLS D1 & SFL)	1–0	Wrexham (FL D3N)
5	Milford United (WLS D1)	2–2	Oswestry Town (B&DL)
replay	Oswestry Town (B&DL)	4–0	Milford United (WLS D1)

== Seventh round ==
Two winners from the Sixth round. Cardiff City, South Liverpool and Chester get a bye to the Semifinals.

Tie no	Home	Score	Away
1	Oswestry Town (B&DL)	4–2	Barry (WLS D1 & SFL)

== Semifinal ==
South Liverpool and Chester played at Goodison Park, the second replay between Cardiff City and Oswestry Town were held at Shrewsbury.

Tie no	Home	Score	Away
1	South Liverpool (LC)	5–2	Chester (FL D3N)
2	Cardiff City (FL D3S)	1–1	Oswestry Town (B&DL)
replay	Oswestry Town (B&DL)	2–2	Cardiff City (FL D3S)
replay	Cardiff City (FL D3S)	2–1	Oswestry Town (B&DL)

== Final ==
Final were held at Wrexham.

Tie no	Home	Score	Away
1	South Liverpool (LC)	2–1	Cardiff City (FL D3S)
