= 1937–38 Welsh Cup =

Tournament details
- Country: Wales
- Teams: 66

Final positions
- Champions: (England) Shrewsbury Town
- Runners-up: (Wales) Swansea Town

Tournament statistics
- Matches played: 82
- Goals scored: 360 (4.39 per match)

The 1937–38 FAW Welsh Cup is the 57th season of the annual knockout tournament for competitive football teams in Wales.

== Key ==
League name pointed after clubs name.

- B&DL - Birmingham & District League
- CCL - Cheshire County League
- FL D2 - Football League Second Division
- FL D3N - Football League Third Division North
- FL D3S - Football League Third Division South
- MWL - Mid-Wales Football League
- ML - Midland League
- SFL - Southern Football League
- WLN - Welsh League North
- WLS D1 - Welsh League South Division One
- WCL - West Cheshire League
- W&DL - Wrexham & District Amateur League

== First round ==
Tie no	Home	Score	Away
1	Blaenau Ffestiniog (WLN)	2–2	Llandudno (WLN)
replay	Llandudno (WLN)	1–1	Blaenau Ffestiniog (WLN)
replay	Blaenau Ffestiniog (WLN)	3–1	Llandudno (WLN)
2	Colwyn Bay	2–3	Penrhyn Quarry (WLN)
3	Llay Welfare (W&DL)	1–1	Llanerch Celts (W&DL)
replay	Llanerch Celts (W&DL)	2–4	Llay Welfare (W&DL)
4	Caergwrle (W&DL)	3–0	Rhosymedre
5	Crosville	1–3	Castle Firebrick Works (W&DL)
6	Mold Alexandra	3–3	Cross Street Gwersyllt (W&DL)
replay	Cross Street Gwersyllt (W&DL)	7–0	Mold Alexandra
7	Buckley Town	6–0	Coedpoeth (W&DL)
8	Druids (W&DL)	0–5	Chirk (W&DL)
9	Flint Town (WCL)	1–1	Gwersyllt (W&DL)
replay	Gwersyllt (W&DL)	3–0	Flint Town (WCL)
10	Courtaulds Holywell	4–1	Vron United (W&DL)
11	Towyn	0–4	Aberdovey (MWL)
12	Machynlleth (MWL)	3–4	Porthmadog (WLN)
13	Aberystwyth Town	4–1	Pwllheli (WLN)
14	Welshpool	8–0	Newtown (MWL)
15	Dolgelley Albion	3–1	Bala Town
16	Tredomen Works	5–1	Porth United
17	Blaina Town	0–10	Llanelly (WLS D1)
18	Ebbw Vale (WLS D1)	0–0	Caerphilly Town (WLS D1)
replay	Caerphilly Town (WLS D1)	2–2	Ebbw Vale (WLS D1)
replay	Ebbw Vale (WLS D1)	4–1	Caerphilly Town (WLS D1)
19	Caerphilly United	w/o	Penrhiwceiber
20	Rhayader (MWL)	w/o	Llanidloes Town (MWL)

== Second round ==
20 winners from the first round plus Haverfordwest Athletic and Lovell's Athletic.

Tie no	Home	Score	Away
1	Blaenau Ffestiniog (WLN)	1–1	Penrhyn Quarry (WLN)
replay	Penrhyn Quarry (WLN)	4–1	Blaenau Ffestiniog (WLN)
2	'Courtaulds Holywell	3–1	Buckley Town
3	Chirk (W&DL)	2–1	Gwersyllt (W&DL)
4	Llay Welfare (W&DL)	3–0	Cross Street Gwersyllt (W&DL)
5	Castle Firebrick Works (W&DL)	3–5*	Caergwrle (W&DL)
replay	Castle Firebrick Works (W&DL)	0–0	Caergwrle (W&DL)
replay	Caergwrle (W&DL)	2–1	Castle Firebrick Works (W&DL)
6	Porthmadog (WLN)	7–1	Dolgelley Albion
7	'Aberystwyth Town	5–4	Aberdovey (MWL)
8	Llanidloes Town (MWL)	7–1	Welshpool
9	Haverfordwest Athletic (WLS D1)	3–1	Tredomen Works
10	Lovell's Athletic (WLS D1)	4–1	Caerphilly United
11	Ebbw Vale (WLS D1)	3–8	Llanelly (WLS D1)

== Third round ==
10 winners from the second round plus 14 new clubs. Llanelly get a bye to the fourth round.

Tie no	Home	Score	Away
1	Penrhyn Quarry (WLN)	5–4	Porthmadog (WLN)
2	Macclesfield (CCL)	3–1	Bangor City (B&DL & WLN)
3	Kidderminster Harriers (B&DL)	1–2	Cheltenham Town (SFL)
4	Wellington Town (B&DL)	6–0	Hereford United (B&DL)
5	Oswestry Town (B&DL)	1–1	Shrewsbury Town (B&DL)
replay	Shrewsbury Town (B&DL)	6–3	Oswestry Town (B&DL)
6	Caergwrle (W&DL)	4–3	Llay Welfare (W&DL)
7	Chirk (W&DL)	3–2	Courtaulds Holywell
8	Aberystwyth Town	0–1	Llanidloes Town (MWL)
9	Aberdare Town (WLS D1)	0–3	Aberaman (WLS D1)
10	Cardiff Corinthians (WLS D1)	2–3	Gwynfi Welfare (WLS D1)
11	Lovell's Athletic (WLS D1)	3–0	Milford United (WLS D1)
12	Haverfordwest Athletic (WLS D1)	4–4	Troedyrhiw (WLS D1)
replay	Troedyrhiw (WLS D1)	1–2	Haverfordwest Athletic (WLS D1)

== Fourth round ==
12 winners from the third round, Llanelly and one new team - Worcester City.

Tie no	Home	Score	Away
1	Wellington Town (B&DL)	1–3	Cheltenham Town (SFL)
2	Macclesfield (CCL)	0–7	Shrewsbury Town (ML)
3	Llanidloes Town (MWL)	4–1	Chirk (W&DL)
4	Penrhyn Quarry (WLN)	0–0*	Caergwrle (W&DL)
5	Llanelly (WLS D1)	2–1	Haverfordwest Athletic (WLS D1)
6	Aberaman (WLS D1)	1–2	Worcester City (B&DL)
7	Gwynfi Welfare (WLS D1)	0–3	Lovell's Athletic (WLS D1)

== Fifth round ==
Four winners from the fourth round. Cheltenham Town, Shrewsbury Town and Worcester City get a bye to the Sixth round.

Tie no	Home	Score	Away
1	Llanidloes Town (MWL)	2–1	Caergwrle (W&DL)
2	Llanelly (WLS D1)	3–0	Lovell's Athletic (WLS D1)

== Sixth round ==
Two winners from the fifth round, Cheltenham Town, Shrewsbury Town and Worcester City and eleven new clubs.

Tie no	Home	Score	Away
1	Newport County (FL D3S)	6–2	Bristol City (FL D3S)
2	Worcester City (B&DL)	2–2	Barry (WLS D1 & SFL)
replay	Barry (WLS D1 & SFL)	1–1	Worcester City (B&DL)
replay	Worcester City (B&DL)	2–0	Barry (WLS D1 & SFL)
3	Swansea Town (FL D2)	8–0	Llanelly (WLS D1)
4	Cardiff City (FL D3S)	0–1	Cheltenham Town (SFL)
5	New Brighton (FL D3N)	1–5	Chester (FL D3N)
6	Llanidloes Town (MWL)	1–1	Rhyl (CCL)
replay	Rhyl (CCL)	1–0	Llanidloes Town (MWL)
7	Wrexham (FL D3N)	1–3	Shrewsbury Town (ML)
8	Southport (FL D3N)	2–0	Crewe Alexandra (FL D3N)

== Seventh round ==
Tie no	Home	Score	Away
1	Newport County (FL D3S)	1–0	Cheltenham Town (SFL)
2	Swansea Town (FL D2)	1–0	Worcester City (B&DL)
3	Rhyl (CCL)	3–2	Southport (FL D3N)
4	Chester (FL D3N)	0–0	Shrewsbury Town (ML)
replay	Shrewsbury Town (ML)	2–1	Chester (FL D3N)

== Semifinal ==
Swansea Town and Rhyl played at Chester.

Tie no	Home	Score	Away
1	Shrewsbury Town (ML)	3–2	Newport County (FL D3S)
2	Swansea Town (FL D2)	7–2	Rhyl (CCL)

== Final ==
Both final and replay were held in Shrewsbury.

Tie no	Home	Score	Away
1	Shrewsbury Town (ML)	2–2	Swansea Town (FL D2)
replay	Shrewsbury Town (ML)	2–1	Swansea Town (FL D2)
