= 1945–46 Southern Football League =

Southern Football League
- Season: 1945–46
- Champions: Chelmsford City
- Matches: 104
- Goals: 515 (4.95 per match)

The 1945–46 Southern Football League season was the 43rd in the history of the league, an English football competition.

It was the first season after the break caused by World War II.

Not all league competitions resumed in 1945 (the Football League did not restart until 1946–47) and six clubs that had featured in the 1939–40 season had left the league, whilst there were four new clubs, Bedford Town, Colchester United, Swindon Town II and Cardiff City II.

Chelmsford City were champions, winning their first Southern League title. At the end of the season Cardiff City and Swindon Town resigned their second teams from the league.

== League table ==
Pos	Team	Pld	W	D	L	GF	GA	GR	Pts	Results
1	Chelmsford City	18	15	1	2	66	23	2.870	34 (Note: Chelmsford City, Cheltenham Town, Yeovil & Petters and Swindon Town II awarded three points for two unfulfilled matches. Bedford Town awarded six points for four unfulfilled matches.)	
2	Hereford United	20	13	3	4	59	31	1.903	29	
3	Bath City	20	12	2	6	62	32	1.938	26	
4	Cheltenham Town	18	9	1	8	35	54	0.648	22	
5	Barry Town	20	8	4	8	42	42	1.000	20	
6	Yeovil & Petters United	18	7	1	10	57	52	1.096	18	
7	Worcester City	20	8	2	10	60	58	1.034	18	
8	Colchester United	20	7	3	10	29	47	0.617	17	
9	Bedford Town	16	4	1	11	30	49	0.612	15	
10	Swindon Town II	18	4	3	11	36	65	0.554	14	Resigned from the league
11	Cardiff City II	20	4	5	11	39	60	0.650	13	Resigned from the league

Source: rsssf.com
Rules for classification: 1) points; 2) goal ratio.
Notes:

The table contains an error as the goals for are 515 and the goals against are 513.
