= 2021–22 English Football League =

123rd season of the English Football League

English Football League
- Season: 2021–22
- Champions: Fulham
- Promoted: Fulham; Bournemouth; Nottingham Forest
- Relegated: Oldham Athletic; Scunthorpe United
- New clubs in league: Sutton United; Hartlepool United

The 2021–22 season was the 123rd season of the English Football League (EFL) and the sixth season under that name after it was renamed from The Football League in 2016. For the ninth season running, the league was sponsored by Sky Betting & Gaming and therefore known as the Sky Bet EFL.

The EFL is contested through three divisions: the Championship, League One and League Two. The winner and the runner-up of the Championship are automatically promoted to the Premier League and they are joined by the winner of the Championship play-off. The bottom two teams in League Two are relegated to the National League.

The two-year partnership extension between the league and its official charity Mind expired after this season.

== Promotion and relegation ==
=== From the Premier League ===
Relegated to the Championship

- Fulham
- West Bromwich Albion
- Sheffield United

=== From the Championship ===
Promoted to the Premier League

- Norwich City
- Watford
- Brentford

Relegated to League One

- Wycombe Wanderers
- Rotherham United
- Sheffield Wednesday

=== From League One ===
Promoted to the Championship

- Hull City
- Peterborough United
- Blackpool

Relegated to League Two

- Rochdale
- Northampton Town
- Swindon Town
- Bristol Rovers

=== From League Two ===
Promoted to League One

- Cheltenham Town
- Cambridge United
- Bolton Wanderers
- Morecambe

Relegated to the National League

- Southend United
- Grimsby Town

=== From the National League ===
Promoted to League Two

- Sutton United
- Hartlepool United

== Championship ==
=== Table ===
Pos	Team	Pld	W	D	L	GF	GA	GD	Pts	Promotion, qualification or relegation
1	Fulham (C, P)	46	27	9	10	106	43	+63	90	Promotion to the Premier League
2	Bournemouth (P)	46	25	13	8	74	39	+35	88	Promotion to the Premier League
3	Huddersfield Town	46	23	13	10	64	47	+17	82	Qualification for Championship play-offs
4	Nottingham Forest (O, P)	46	23	11	12	73	40	+33	80	Qualification for Championship play-offs
5	Sheffield United	46	21	12	13	63	45	+18	75	Qualification for Championship play-offs
6	Luton Town	46	21	12	13	63	55	+8	75	Qualification for Championship play-offs
7	Middlesbrough	46	20	10	16	59	50	+9	70	
8	Blackburn Rovers	46	19	12	15	59	50	+9	69	
9	Millwall	46	18	15	13	53	45	+8	69	
10	West Bromwich Albion	46	18	13	15	52	45	+7	67	
11	Queens Park Rangers	46	19	9	18	60	59	+1	66	
12	Coventry City	46	17	13	16	60	59	+1	64	
13	Preston North End	46	16	16	14	52	56	−4	64	
14	Stoke City	46	17	11	18	57	52	+5	62	
15	Swansea City	46	16	13	17	58	68	−10	61	
16	Blackpool	46	16	12	18	54	58	−4	60	
17	Bristol City	46	15	10	21	62	77	−15	55	
18	Cardiff City	46	15	8	23	50	68	−18	53	
19	Hull City	46	14	9	23	41	54	−13	51	
20	Birmingham City	46	11	14	21	50	75	−25	47	
21	Reading	46	13	8	25	54	87	−33	41 (Note: Reading were deducted 6 points for breach of profit and sustainability regulations.)	
22	Peterborough United (R)	46	9	10	27	43	87	−44	37	Relegation to EFL League One
23	Derby County (R)	46	14	13	19	45	53	−8	34 (Note: Derby County were deducted 12 points for entering administration, and a further 9 points for financial irregularities.)	Relegation to EFL League One
24	Barnsley (R)	46	6	12	28	33	73	−40	30	Relegation to EFL League One

Source: EFL Official Website
Rules for classification: 1) Points; 2) Goal difference; 3) Number of goals scored; 4) Head-to-head results; 5) Wins; 6) Away goals; 7) Penalty points (sec 9.5); 8) 12-point sending off offences
(C) Champions; (O) Play-off winners; (P) Promoted; (R) Relegated

=== Play-offs ===
Semi-finals
3	Huddersfield Town	1	1	2
6	Luton Town	1	0	1
4	Nottingham Forest	2	1	3 (3)
5	Sheffield United	1	2	3 (2)

Final
3	Huddersfield Town	0
4	Nottingham Forest	1

First leg

13 May 2022
19:45

Luton Town	1–1	Huddersfield Town
Bradley 30'	Report	Sinani 12'

Kenilworth Road, Luton
Attendance: 10,005
Referee: Robert Jones
14 May 2022
15:00

Sheffield United	1–2	Nottingham Forest
Berge 90+1'	Report	Colback 10'; Johnson 71'

Bramall Lane, Sheffield
Attendance: 30,225
Referee: Andre Marriner

Second leg

16 May 2022
19:45

Huddersfield Town	1–0	Luton Town
Rhodes 82'	Report

Kirklees Stadium, Huddersfield
Attendance: 23,507
Referee: Peter Bankes

Huddersfield Town won 2–1 on aggregate.

17 May 2022
19:45

Nottingham Forest	1–2 (a.e.t.)	Sheffield United
Johnson 19'	Report	Gibbs-White 47'; Fleck 75'
Penalties
Johnson (penalty scored); Cafú (penalty scored); Cook (penalty scored); Lolley (penalty missed)	3–2	(penalty missed) Norwood; (penalty missed) Hourihane; (penalty scored) Berge; (penalty scored) Ndiaye; (penalty missed) Gibbs-White

City Ground, West Bridgford
Attendance: 29,015
Referee: Michael Oliver

3–3 on aggregate. Nottingham Forest won 3–2 on penalties.

=== Final ===
29 May 2022
16:30 BST

Huddersfield Town	0–1	Nottingham Forest
	Report	Colwill 43' (o.g.)

Wembley Stadium, London
Attendance: 80,019
Referee: Jon Moss

=== Results ===
Home \ Away	BOU	BAR	BIR	BLA	BLP	BRI	CAR	COV	DER	FUL	HUD	HUL	LUT	MID	MIL	NTF	PET	PNE	QPR	REA	SHU	STO	SWA	WBA
Bournemouth	—	3–0	3–1	0–2	2–2	3–2	3–0	2–2	2–0	1–1	3–0	0–1	2–1	0–0	1–0	1–0	1–1	1–2	2–1	1–1	2–1	2–1	4–0	2–2
Barnsley	0–1	—	1–1	0–0	0–2	2–0	0–1	1–0	2–1	1–1	1–1	0–2	0–1	3–2	0–1	1–3	0–2	1–3	1–0	1–1	2–3	1–1	0–2	0–0
Birmingham City	0–2	2–1	—	1–2	1–0	3–0	2–2	2–4	2–0	1–4	0–2	0–0	3–0	0–2	2–2	0–3	2–2	0–0	1–2	1–2	1–2	0–0	2–1	1–0
Blackburn Rovers	0–3	2–1	4–0	—	1–1	0–1	5–1	2–2	3–1	0–7	0–0	2–0	2–2	1–0	0–0	0–2	4–0	1–0	1–0	2–0	3–1	0–1	2–1	1–2
Blackpool	1–2	1–0	6–1	2–1	—	3–1	0–2	0–1	0–2	1–0	0–3	1–0	0–3	1–2	1–0	1–4	3–1	2–0	1–1	4–1	0–0	0–1	1–0	0–0
Bristol City	0–2	2–1	1–2	1–1	1–1	—	3–2	1–2	1–0	1–1	2–3	5–0	1–1	2–1	3–2	1–2	1–1	0–0	1–2	2–1	1–1	1–0	0–1	2–2
Cardiff City	0–1	1–1	1–1	0–1	1–1	1–2	—	2–0	1–0	0–1	2–1	0–1	0–1	0–2	3–1	2–1	4–0	0–0	0–1	0–1	2–3	2–1	0–4	0–4
Coventry City	0–3	1–0	0–0	2–2	1–1	3–2	1–0	—	1–1	4–1	1–2	0–2	0–1	2–0	0–1	2–1	3–0	1–1	1–2	2–1	4–1	1–0	1–2	1–2
Derby County	3–2	2–0	2–2	1–2	1–0	1–3	0–1	1–1	—	2–1	1–1	3–1	2–2	0–0	1–2	1–1	1–0	1–0	1–2	1–0	2–0	2–1	0–0	1–0
Fulham	1–1	4–1	6–2	2–0	1–1	6–2	2–0	1–3	0–0	—	1–2	2–0	7–0	1–1	3–0	0–1	2–1	3–0	4–1	1–2	0–1	3–0	3–1	3–0
Huddersfield Town	0–3	2–1	0–0	3–2	3–2	2–0	2–1	1–1	2–0	1–5	—	2–0	2–0	1–2	1–0	0–2	3–0	1–0	2–2	4–0	0–0	1–1	1–1	1–0
Hull City	0–0	0–2	2–0	2–0	1–1	2–2	2–1	0–1	0–1	0–1	0–1	—	1–3	2–0	2–1	1–1	1–2	0–1	0–3	3–0	1–3	0–2	2–0	0–2
Luton Town	3–2	2–1	0–5	0–0	1–1	2–1	1–2	5–0	1–0	1–1	0–0	1–0	—	3–1	2–2	1–0	3–0	4–0	1–2	1–0	0–0	0–1	3–3	2–0
Middlesbrough	1–0	2–0	0–2	1–1	1–2	2–1	2–0	1–0	4–1	0–1	0–2	0–1	2–1	—	1–1	2–0	2–0	1–2	2–3	2–1	2–0	3–1	1–0	2–1
Millwall	1–1	4–1	3–1	1–1	2–1	1–0	2–1	1–1	1–1	1–2	2–0	2–1	0–2	0–0	—	0–1	3–0	0–0	2–0	1–0	1–0	2–1	0–1	2–0
Nottingham Forest	1–2	3–0	2–0	1–2	2–1	2–0	1–2	2–0	2–1	0–4	0–1	2–1	0–0	0–2	1–1	—	2–0	3–0	3–1	4–0	1–1	2–2	5–1	4–0
Peterborough United	0–0	0–0	3–0	2–1	5–0	2–3	2–2	1–4	2–1	0–1	1–1	0–3	1–1	0–4	2–1	0–1	—	0–1	2–1	0–0	0–2	2–2	2–3	0–1
Preston North End	2–1	2–1	1–1	1–4	1–0	2–2	1–2	2–1	0–0	1–1	0–0	1–4	2–0	4–1	1–1	0–0	1–0	—	2–1	2–3	2–2	1–1	3–1	1–1
Queens Park Rangers	0–1	2–2	2–0	1–0	2–1	1–2	1–2	2–0	1–0	0–2	1–0	1–1	2–0	2–2	1–1	1–1	1–3	3–2	—	4–0	1–3	0–2	0–0	1–0
Reading	0–2	1–0	2–1	1–0	2–3	2–3	1–2	2–3	2–2	0–7	3–4	1–1	0–2	1–0	0–1	1–1	3–1	2–1	3–3	—	0–1	2–1	4–4	0–1
Sheffield United	0–0	2–0	0–1	1–0	0–1	2–0	1–0	0–0	1–0	4–0	1–2	0–0	2–0	4–1	1–2	1–1	6–2	2–2	1–0	1–2	—	2–1	4–0	2–0
Stoke City	0–1	1–1	2–2	0–1	0–1	0–1	3–3	1–1	1–2	2–3	2–1	2–0	1–2	0–0	2–0	1–0	2–0	1–2	1–0	3–2	1–0	—	3–0	1–0
Swansea City	3–3	1–1	0–0	1–0	1–1	3–1	3–0	3–1	2–1	1–5	1–0	0–0	0–1	1–1	0–0	1–4	3–0	1–0	0–1	2–3	0–0	1–3	—	2–1
West Bromwich Albion	2–0	4–0	1–0	0–0	2–1	3–0	1–1	0–0	0–0	1–0	2–2	1–0	3–2	1–1	1–1	0–0	3–0	0–2	2–1	1–0	4–0	1–3	0–2	—

Source: "Championship Results". Sky Sports.
Legend: Blue = home team win; Yellow = draw; Red = away team win.
For upcoming matches, an "a" indicates there is an article about the rivalry between the two participants.

== League One ==
=== Table ===
Pos	Team	Pld	W	D	L	GF	GA	GD	Pts	Promotion, qualification or relegation
1	Wigan Athletic (C, P)	46	27	11	8	82	44	+38	92	Promotion to EFL Championship
2	Rotherham United (P)	46	27	9	10	70	33	+37	90	Promotion to EFL Championship
3	Milton Keynes Dons	46	26	11	9	78	44	+34	89	Qualification for League One play-offs
4	Sheffield Wednesday	46	24	13	9	78	50	+28	85	Qualification for League One play-offs
5	Sunderland (O, P)	46	24	12	10	79	53	+26	84	Qualification for League One play-offs
6	Wycombe Wanderers	46	23	14	9	75	51	+24	83	Qualification for League One play-offs
7	Plymouth Argyle	46	23	11	12	68	48	+20	80	
8	Oxford United	46	22	10	14	82	59	+23	76	
9	Bolton Wanderers	46	21	10	15	74	57	+17	73	
10	Portsmouth	46	20	13	13	68	51	+17	73	
11	Ipswich Town	46	18	16	12	67	46	+21	70	
12	Accrington Stanley	46	17	10	19	61	80	−19	61	
13	Charlton Athletic	46	17	8	21	55	59	−4	59	
14	Cambridge United	46	15	13	18	56	74	−18	58	
15	Cheltenham Town	46	13	17	16	66	80	−14	56	
16	Burton Albion	46	14	11	21	51	67	−16	53	
17	Lincoln City	46	14	10	22	55	63	−8	52	
18	Shrewsbury Town	46	12	14	20	47	51	−4	50	
19	Morecambe	46	10	12	24	57	88	−31	42	
20	Fleetwood Town	46	8	16	22	62	82	−20	40	
21	Gillingham (R)	46	8	16	22	35	69	−34	40	Relegation to EFL League Two
22	Doncaster Rovers (R)	46	10	8	28	37	82	−45	38	Relegation to EFL League Two
23	AFC Wimbledon (R)	46	6	19	21	49	75	−26	37	Relegation to EFL League Two
24	Crewe Alexandra (R)	46	7	8	31	37	83	−46	29	Relegation to EFL League Two

Source: EFL Official Website
Rules for classification: 1) Points; 2) Goal difference; 3) Number of goals scored; 4) Head-to-head results; 5) Wins; 6) Away goals; 7) Penalty points based on yellow and red cards received excluding the last four games of the season (sec 9.5); 8) 12-point sending off offences; 9) If the tie affects the automatic promotion or relegation places, a play-off game or games would be held between the two tied teams
(C) Champions; (O) Play-off winners; (P) Promoted; (R) Relegated

=== Play-offs ===
Semi-finals
3	Milton Keynes Dons	0	1	1
6	Wycombe Wanderers	2	0	2
4	Sheffield Wednesday	0	1	1
5	Sunderland	1	1	2

Final
6	Wycombe Wanderers	0
5	Sunderland	2

First leg

5 May 2022
19:45

Wycombe Wanderers	2–0	Milton Keynes Dons
Gape (yellow card) 31': Tafazolli 38' (Jacobson); Jacobson (yellow card) 60' Horgan (yellow card) 64'; Vokes 82' (McCleary)	Report	McEachran (yellow card) 63' (yellow-red card) 69'

Adams Park, High Wycombe
Attendance: 8,987
Referee: Darren Bond
6 May 2022
19:45

Sunderland	1–0	Sheffield Wednesday
Stewart 45+1'; O'Nien (yellow card) 63'	Report	Luongo (yellow card) 52'

Stadium of Light, Sunderland
Attendance: 44,742
Referee: Matt Donohue

Second leg

8 May 2022
18:30

Milton Keynes Dons	1–0	Wycombe Wanderers
Parrott 26' (Boateng)	Report	Scowen (yellow card) 30'; McCarthy (yellow card) 83'; Jacobson (yellow card) 83'

Stadium MK, Milton Keynes
Attendance: 13,012
Referee: Thomas Bramall

Wycombe Wanderers won 2–1 on aggregate.

9 May 2022
19:45

Sheffield Wednesday	1–1	Sunderland
Byers (yellow card) 24'; Bannan (yellow card) 27'; Gregory 74' (Johnson); Dean (yellow card) 77'	Report	Stewart (yellow card) 45+1'; Roberts 90+3' (Clarke); Matete (yellow card) 90+11'

Hillsborough Stadium, Owlerton
Attendance: 32,978
Referee: James Linington

Sunderland won 2–1 on aggregate.

=== Final ===
21 May 2022
15:00 BST

Wycombe Wanderers	0–2	Sunderland
	Report	Embleton 12'; Stewart 79'

Wembley Stadium, London
Attendance: 72,332
Referee: Simon Hooper

=== Results ===
Home \ Away	ACC	WIM	BOL	BRT	CAM	CHA	CHE	CRE	DON	FLE	GIL	IPS	LIN	MKD	MOR	OXF	PLY	POR	ROT	SHW	SHR	SUN	WIG	WYC
Accrington Stanley	—	0–2	1–0	0–0	2–1	2–1	4–4	4–1	1–0	5–1	1–2	2–1	2–1	1–1	2–2	2–0	1–4	2–2	1–0	2–3	1–0	1–1	1–4	3–2
AFC Wimbledon	3–4	—	3–3	1–1	0–1	1–1	2–2	3–2	2–2	2–2	1–1	0–2	0–2	1–1	0–0	3–1	0–1	0–0	0–1	2–2	1–1	1–1	0–2	1–1
Bolton Wanderers	3–1	4–0	—	0–0	2–0	2–1	2–2	2–0	3–0	4–2	2–2	2–0	3–1	3–3	1–1	2–1	0–1	1–1	0–2	1–1	2–1	6–0	0–4	0–2
Burton Albion	4–0	1–1	3–1	—	2–2	0–1	1–1	4–1	2–0	3–2	1–1	2–1	1–2	0–1	3–2	1–3	0–0	2–1	2–0	0–2	0–2	1–0	0–0	1–2
Cambridge United	2–0	1–0	1–0	3–0	—	0–2	2–2	1–0	3–1	2–2	0–2	2–2	1–5	0–1	2–1	1–1	2–0	0–0	0–1	1–1	0–0	1–2	2–2	1–4
Charlton Athletic	2–3	3–2	1–4	2–0	2–0	—	1–2	2–0	4–0	2–0	1–0	2–0	1–2	0–2	2–3	0–4	2–0	2–2	1–1	0–0	2–0	0–0	0–2	0–1
Cheltenham Town	1–0	3–1	1–2	1–1	0–5	1–1	—	1–2	4–0	2–0	2–2	2–1	2–2	1–1	3–1	1–0	0–2	1–0	0–2	2–2	2–1	2–1	0–0	1–3
Crewe Alexandra	0–1	3–1	0–1	2–0	2–2	2–1	1–1	—	1–1	1–3	2–0	1–1	2–0	1–4	1–3	0–1	1–4	1–3	0–2	0–2	0–0	0–4	0–2	1–3
Doncaster Rovers	2–0	1–2	1–2	2–0	1–1	0–1	3–2	2–0	—	0–1	0–1	0–1	0–0	2–1	1–0	1–2	1–3	0–0	0–5	1–3	1–0	0–3	1–2	0–2
Fleetwood Town	1–2	1–1	3–0	0–1	1–1	1–2	3–2	3–0	0–0	—	2–1	0–2	1–1	1–1	1–2	2–3	3–3	0–1	1–0	2–3	0–3	2–2	2–3	3–3
Gillingham	0–0	0–0	0–3	1–3	1–0	1–1	0–2	1–0	1–0	0–0	—	0–4	1–1	1–4	2–1	2–7	0–2	0–1	0–2	0–0	0–0	1–2	0–2	1–1
Ipswich Town	2–1	2–2	2–5	3–0	0–1	4–0	0–0	2–1	6–0	2–1	1–0	—	2–0	2–2	2–2	0–0	1–0	0–0	0–2	1–1	2–1	1–1	2–2	1–0
Lincoln City	0–1	0–1	0–1	1–2	0–1	2–1	3–0	2–1	0–1	2–1	0–2	0–1	—	2–3	2–1	2–0	2–2	0–3	1–1	3–1	1–1	0–0	1–3	1–1
Milton Keynes Dons	2–0	1–0	2–0	1–0	4–1	2–1	3–1	2–1	0–1	3–3	0–0	0–0	2–1	—	2–0	1–2	1–1	1–0	0–3	2–3	2–0	1–2	1–1	1–0
Morecambe	3–3	3–4	1–1	3–0	0–2	2–2	1–3	1–2	4–3	0–0	1–1	1–1	2–0	0–4	—	2–1	1–1	1–1	0–1	1–0	2–0	0–1	1–2	3–2
Oxford United	5–1	3–0	2–3	4–1	4–2	2–1	1–1	1–0	1–1	3–1	1–1	1–1	3–1	1–0	3–1	—	1–3	3–2	0–0	3–2	2–0	1–2	2–3	0–0
Plymouth Argyle	4–0	2–0	3–0	2–1	1–1	1–0	2–0	1–1	2–1	1–1	1–0	2–1	1–2	0–5	2–0	1–0	—	1–0	0–1	3–0	1–0	0–0	1–2	0–3
Portsmouth	4–0	2–1	1–0	2–1	1–2	1–2	1–1	2–0	4–0	3–3	3–1	0–4	3–2	1–2	2–0	3–2	2–2	—	3–0	0–0	1–0	4–0	3–2	0–0
Rotherham United	1–0	3–0	2–1	3–1	3–1	0–1	1–0	1–1	2–0	2–4	5–1	1–0	2–1	1–2	2–0	2–1	2–0	4–1	—	0–2	0–3	5–1	1–1	0–0
Sheffield Wednesday	1–1	2–1	1–0	5–2	6–0	2–0	4–1	1–0	2–0	1–0	1–1	1–0	1–1	2–1	2–0	1–2	4–2	4–1	0–2	—	1–1	3–0	1–0	2–2
Shrewsbury Town	0–0	2–1	0–1	0–1	4–1	1–0	3–1	1–1	3–3	1–1	2–1	1–1	1–0	1–0	5–0	1–2	0–3	1–2	0–0	1–0	—	1–1	0–3	1–2
Sunderland	2–1	1–0	1–0	1–1	5–1	0–1	5–0	2–0	1–2	3–1	1–0	2–0	1–3	1–2	5–0	1–1	2–1	1–0	1–1	5–0	3–2	—	2–1	3–1
Wigan Athletic	3–0	1–0	1–1	2–0	1–2	2–1	2–0	2–0	2–1	2–0	3–2	1–1	1–2	1–2	4–1	1–1	1–1	1–0	1–0	1–2	2–1	0–3	—	1–1
Wycombe Wanderers	2–1	2–2	1–0	2–1	3–0	2–1	5–5	2–1	2–0	1–0	2–0	1–4	1–0	0–1	4–3	2–0	2–0	0–1	0–0	1–0	0–0	3–3	1–3	—

Updated to match(es) played on 30 April 2022. Source:
Legend: Blue = home team win; Yellow = draw; Red = away team win.
For upcoming matches, an "a" indicates there is an article about the rivalry between the two participants.

== League Two ==
=== Table ===
Pos	Team	Pld	W	D	L	GF	GA	GD	Pts	Promotion, qualification or relegation
1	Forest Green Rovers (C, P)	46	23	15	8	75	44	+31	84	Promotion to EFL League One
2	Exeter City (P)	46	23	15	8	65	41	+24	84	Promotion to EFL League One
3	Bristol Rovers (P)	46	23	11	12	71	49	+22	80	Promotion to EFL League One
4	Northampton Town	46	23	11	12	60	38	+22	80	Qualification for League Two play-offs
5	Port Vale (O, P)	46	22	12	12	67	46	+21	78	Qualification for League Two play-offs
6	Swindon Town	46	22	11	13	77	54	+23	77	Qualification for League Two play-offs
7	Mansfield Town	46	22	11	13	67	52	+15	77	Qualification for League Two play-offs
8	Sutton United	46	22	10	14	69	53	+16	76	
9	Tranmere Rovers	46	21	12	13	53	40	+13	75	
10	Salford City	46	19	13	14	60	46	+14	70	
11	Newport County	46	19	12	15	67	58	+9	69	
12	Crawley Town	46	17	10	19	56	66	−10	61	
13	Leyton Orient	46	14	16	16	62	47	+15	58	
14	Bradford City	46	14	16	16	53	55	−2	58	
15	Colchester United	46	14	13	19	48	60	−12	55	
16	Walsall	46	14	12	20	47	60	−13	54	
17	Hartlepool United	46	14	12	20	44	64	−20	54	
18	Rochdale	46	12	17	17	51	59	−8	53	
19	Harrogate Town	46	14	11	21	64	75	−11	53	
20	Carlisle United	46	14	11	21	39	62	−23	53	
21	Stevenage	46	11	14	21	45	68	−23	47	
22	Barrow	46	10	14	22	44	57	−13	44	
23	Oldham Athletic (R)	46	9	11	26	46	75	−29	38	Relegation to National League
24	Scunthorpe United (R)	46	4	14	28	29	90	−61	26	Relegation to National League

Source: EFL Official Website
Rules for classification: 1) Points; 2) Goal difference; 3) Number of goals scored; 4) Head-to-head results; 5) Wins; 6) Away goals; 7) Penalty points (sec 9.5); 8) 12-point sending off offences
(C) Champions; (O) Play-off winners; (P) Promoted; (R) Relegated

=== Play-offs ===
Semi-finals
4	Northampton Town	1	0	1
7	Mansfield Town	2	1	3
5	Port Vale	1	1	2
6	Swindon Town	2	0	2

Final
7	Mansfield Town	0
5	Port Vale	3

First leg

14 May 2022
19:45

Mansfield Town	2–1	Northampton Town
Oates 13'; Bowery 32'	Report	Koiki 61'

Field Mill, Mansfield
Attendance: 7,469
Referee: Anthony Backhouse
15 May 2022
12:00

Swindon Town	2–1	Port Vale
McKirdy 26', 68'	Report	Wilson 83'

County Ground, Swindon
Attendance: 14,086
Referee: Ross Joyce

Second leg

18 May 2022
19:45

Northampton Town	0–1	Mansfield Town
	Report	McLaughlin 32'

Sixfields Stadium, Northampton
Attendance: 7,619
Referee: Ben Toner

Mansfield Town won 3–1 on aggregate.

19 May 2022
19:45

Port Vale	1–0	Swindon Town
	Report

Vale Park, Burslem
Attendance: 11,669
Referee: Seb Stockbridge

Port Vale won 2-2 on aggregate, 6-5 on penalties.

=== Final ===
28 May 2022
16:00 BST

Mansfield Town	0–3	Port Vale
	Report	Harratt 20'; Wilson 24'; Benning 85'

Wembley Stadium, London
Attendance: 37,303
Referee: Jarred Gillett

=== Results ===
Home \ Away	BRW	BRA	BRI	CAR	COL	CRA	EXE	FOR	HAR	HAT	LEY	MAN	NEW	NOR	OLD	POR	ROC	SAL	SCU	STE	SUT	SWI	TRA	WAL
Barrow	—	1–2	1–1	1–2	2–3	0–1	0–0	4–0	0–0	3–2	1–1	1–3	2–1	1–3	0–0	1–2	1–2	0–2	1–1	0–0	1–0	2–0	1–1	1–1
Bradford City	1–1	—	2–2	2–0	0–0	1–2	0–1	1–1	1–3	1–3	1–1	0–2	0–0	1–1	2–1	1–2	2–0	2–1	2–1	4–1	2–2	1–2	1–1	1–1
Bristol Rovers	1–0	2–1	—	3–0	1–0	1–0	1–1	0–0	3–0	2–0	1–3	0–0	1–3	2–1	1–0	1–2	4–2	1–0	7–0	0–2	2–0	1–3	2–2	1–0
Carlisle United	0–0	2–0	1–0	—	0–0	1–1	0–1	0–2	0–2	0–0	1–1	1–0	1–2	2–1	0–0	1–3	2–0	2–1	2–2	2–1	0–2	0–3	0–1	1–0
Colchester United	0–2	3–0	1–1	2–2	—	0–1	3–1	0–1	1–0	1–2	2–2	1–1	1–1	0–1	1–1	1–0	1–1	0–2	2–1	0–2	1–3	1–1	1–0	2–2
Crawley Town	1–0	2–1	1–2	2–1	3–1	—	1–3	2–1	2–2	0–1	0–2	1–2	1–1	0–0	2–2	1–4	1–0	2–1	0–0	2–2	0–1	3–1	0–1	1–0
Exeter City	2–1	0–0	4–1	2–1	2–0	2–1	—	0–0	4–3	0–0	1–0	2–1	2–2	1–2	2–1	0–1	2–0	0–0	2–0	2–1	2–0	3–1	0–1	2–2
Forest Green Rovers	2–0	0–2	2–0	3–0	2–0	6–3	0–0	—	1–3	1–1	1–1	1–0	2–0	1–0	2–0	0–2	2–1	3–1	1–0	2–0	2–1	0–2	0–0	0–1
Harrogate Town	2–1	2–0	0–1	3–0	1–2	1–3	1–1	1–4	—	1–2	0–3	0–0	2–2	1–2	3–0	1–1	3–2	0–2	6–1	0–0	0–2	1–4	2–2	1–1
Hartlepool United	3–1	0–2	1–0	2–1	0–2	1–0	1–1	1–3	3–2	—	0–0	2–2	1–2	2–1	0–0	0–1	2–1	0–2	0–0	1–1	1–1	0–3	1–0	2–0
Leyton Orient	2–0	2–0	0–2	0–1	0–1	1–2	3–0	1–1	0–2	5–0	—	0–0	0–1	2–4	4–0	0–0	3–1	0–2	3–0	2–2	4–1	4–1	0–1	0–0
Mansfield Town	0–1	2–3	2–1	1–0	2–1	2–0	2–1	2–2	1–3	3–2	2–0	—	2–1	1–0	0–0	1–1	1–1	2–1	3–1	2–0	2–3	3–2	2–0	2–0
Newport County	2–1	0–0	1–0	2–2	1–2	1–2	0–1	1–1	4–0	2–3	2–2	1–1	—	0–1	3–3	2–1	0–2	0–2	3–0	5–0	3–2	1–2	4–2	2–1
Northampton Town	0–1	0–0	0–1	3–0	3–0	0–1	1–1	1–1	3–0	2–0	1–0	2–0	1–0	—	2–1	1–0	1–3	1–0	2–0	3–0	0–2	1–1	3–2	1–1
Oldham Athletic	0–3	2–0	2–1	1–2	1–2	3–3	0–2	5–5	1–2	0–0	2–0	1–2	0–1	0–2	—	3–2	0–0	1–2	1–3	3–0	1–3	1–3	0–1	1–3
Port Vale	3–1	1–1	1–3	0–0	3–0	4–1	0–0	1–1	2–0	2–0	3–2	3–1	1–2	0–0	3–2	—	2–3	0–1	1–0	2–0	2–0	1–3	0–0	0–1
Rochdale	0–0	0–0	3–4	2–0	1–1	0–1	1–1	1–2	3–3	2–1	2–2	0–1	3–0	1–0	0–1	1–1	—	1–1	0–0	2–2	3–2	0–0	1–0	1–0
Salford City	2–2	1–0	1–1	2–1	0–3	2–1	1–2	1–1	2–0	2–0	1–1	2–2	3–0	2–2	2–0	0–1	0–0	—	5–1	1–0	0–0	0–1	1–1	2–1
Scunthorpe United	0–1	1–1	2–3	0–1	1–3	2–1	0–4	0–2	0–3	1–1	1–1	0–4	0–1	0–0	0–1	0–1	1–2	1–1	—	1–1	1–1	1–3	1–0	1–0
Stevenage	1–0	0–1	0–4	0–2	1–0	2–1	2–2	0–4	3–0	2–0	0–0	1–2	0–2	1–2	0–1	1–1	1–0	4–2	1–1	—	3–3	1–1	2–0	3–1
Sutton United	1–0	1–4	1–1	4–0	3–2	3–0	2–1	1–1	1–0	1–0	1–0	2–0	1–0	0–0	1–2	4–3	3–0	0–0	4–1	2–1	—	1–2	1–1	0–1
Swindon Town	2–1	1–3	1–1	1–2	0–0	1–1	1–2	2–1	1–1	3–1	1–2	1–0	0–1	5–2	1–0	1–2	2–2	1–2	3–0	0–0	2–1	—	0–0	5–0
Tranmere Rovers	2–0	2–1	1–1	2–2	2–0	2–1	2–0	0–4	2–0	1–0	1–0	3–2	0–1	0–2	2–0	1–1	2–0	2–0	4–0	1–0	0–1	3–0	—	1–0
Walsall	2–2	1–2	1–2	1–0	3–0	1–1	0–2	1–3	1–3	3–1	0–2	3–1	3–3	0–1	2–1	2–0	0–0	2–1	1–1	1–0	1–0	0–3	1–0	—

Legend: Blue = home team win; Yellow = draw; Red = away team win.
For upcoming matches, an "a" indicates there is an article about the rivalry between the two participants.

== Managerial changes ==
Team	Outgoing manager	Manner of departure	Date of vacancy	Position in table	Incoming manager	Date of appointment	Position in table
Northampton Town	(England) Keith Curle	Sacked	10 February 2021	2020–21 English Football League	(Australia) Jon Brady	8 May 2021	Pre-season
Barrow	(England) Michael Jolley	Sacked	21 February 2021	2020–21 English Football League	(England) Mark Cooper	28 May 2021	Pre-season
Colchester United	(England) Steve Ball	Sacked	23 February 2021	2020–21 English Football League	(England) Hayden Mullins	13 May 2021	Pre-season
Leyton Orient	(England) Ross Embleton	Sacked	27 February 2021	2020–21 English Football League	(Wales) Kenny Jackett	21 May 2021	Pre-season
Doncaster Rovers	(Jamaica) Darren Moore	Appointed by Sheffield Wednesday	1 March 2021	2020–21 English Football League	(England) Richie Wellens	17 May 2021	Pre-season
Sheffield United	(England) Chris Wilder	Sacked	13 March 2021	2020–21 Premier League	(Serbia) Slaviša Jokanović	27 May 2021	Pre-season
Preston North End	(Scotland) Alex Neil	Sacked	21 March 2021	2020–21 English Football League	(Scotland) Frankie McAvoy	10 May 2021	Pre-season
Forest Green Rovers	(England) Mark Cooper	Sacked	11 April 2021	2020–21 English Football League	(Wales) Rob Edwards	27 May 2021	Pre-season
Swindon Town	(Republic of Ireland) John Sheridan	Resigned	18 April 2021	2020–21 English Football League	(England) John McGreal	26 May 2021	Pre-season
Walsall	(England) Brian Dutton	Sacked	10 May 2021	Pre-season	(England) Matthew Taylor	19 May 2021	Pre-season
Bradford City	(England) Mark Trueman (England) Conor Sellars	Sacked	10 May 2021	Pre-season	(Scotland) Derek Adams	4 June 2021	Pre-season
Tranmere Rovers	(England) Keith Hill	Sacked	11 May 2021	2020–21 English Football League	(Scotland) Micky Mellon	31 May 2021	Pre-season
West Bromwich Albion	(England) Sam Allardyce	Resigned	19 May 2021	2020–21 Premier League	(France) Valérien Ismaël	24 June 2021	Pre-season
Morecambe	(Scotland) Derek Adams	Resigned	2 June 2021	Pre-season	(Northern Ireland) Stephen Robinson	7 June 2021	Pre-season
Barnsley	(France) Valérien Ismaël	Appointed by West Bromwich Albion	24 June 2021	Pre-season	(Austria) Markus Schopp	29 June 2021	Pre-season
Swindon Town	(England) John McGreal	Resigned	25 June 2021	Pre-season	(England) Ben Garner	21 July 2021	Pre-season
Bournemouth	(England) Jonathan Woodgate	End of contract	27 June 2021	Pre-season	(England) Scott Parker	28 June 2021	Pre-season
Fulham	(England) Scott Parker	Appointed by Bournemouth	28 June 2021	Pre-season	(Portugal) Marco Silva	1 July 2021	Pre-season
Rochdale	(Republic of Ireland) Brian Barry-Murphy	Resigned	30 June 2021	Pre-season	(Scotland) Robbie Stockdale	10 July 2021	Pre-season
Swansea City	(Wales) Steve Cooper	Resigned	21 July 2021	Pre-season	(Scotland) Russell Martin	1 August 2021	Pre-season
Milton Keynes Dons	(Scotland) Russell Martin	Appointed by Swansea City	1 August 2021	Pre-season	(England) Liam Manning	13 August 2021	8th
Nottingham Forest	(Republic of Ireland) Chris Hughton	Sacked	16 September 2021	24th	(Wales) Steve Cooper	21 September 2021	24th
Newport County	(Wales) Michael Flynn	Resigned	1 October 2021	15th	(Wales) James Rowberry	19 October 2021	13th
Carlisle United	(England) Chris Beech	Sacked	10 October 2021	22nd	(England) Keith Millen	26 October 2021	22nd
Charlton Athletic	(England) Nigel Adkins	Sacked	21 October 2021	22nd	(England) Johnnie Jackson	17 December 2021	11th
Cardiff City	(Republic of Ireland) Mick McCarthy	Mutual consent	23 October 2021	21st	(Wales) Steve Morison	12 November 2021	20th
Scunthorpe United	(England) Neil Cox	Sacked	1 November 2021	24th	(England) Keith Hill	5 November 2021	24th
Barnsley	(Austria) Markus Schopp	Sacked	1 November 2021	23rd	(Sweden) Poya Asbaghi	17 November 2021	23rd
Hartlepool United	(England) Dave Challinor	Appointed by Stockport County	1 November 2021	10th	(England) Graeme Lee	1 December 2021	17th
Middlesbrough	(England) Neil Warnock	Mutual consent	6 November 2021	14th	(England) Chris Wilder	7 November 2021	14th
Stevenage	(England) Alex Revell	Sacked	15 November 2021	21st	(England) Paul Tisdale	28 November 2021	21st
Fleetwood Town	(England) Simon Grayson	Sacked	24 November 2021	22nd	(Scotland) Stephen Crainey	21 December 2021	18th
Oldham Athletic	(England) Keith Curle	Sacked	24 November 2021	22nd	(Republic of Ireland) John Sheridan	22 January 2022	24th
Sheffield United	(Serbia) Slaviša Jokanović	Sacked	25 November 2021	16th	(England) Paul Heckingbottom	25 November 2021	16th
Doncaster Rovers	(England) Richie Wellens	Sacked	2 December 2021	23rd	(England) Gary McSheffrey	29 December 2021	23rd
Ipswich Town	(England) Paul Cook	Sacked	4 December 2021	11th	(Northern Ireland) Kieran McKenna	16 December 2021	12th
Preston North End	(Scotland) Frankie McAvoy	Sacked	6 December 2021	18th	(England) Ryan Lowe	7 December 2021	18th
Plymouth Argyle	(England) Ryan Lowe	Appointed by Preston North End	7 December 2021	4th	(England) Steven Schumacher	7 December 2021	4th
Gillingham	(Scotland) Steve Evans	Mutual consent	9 January 2022	22nd	(England) Neil Harris	31 January 2022	23rd
Colchester United	(England) Hayden Mullins	Sacked	19 January 2022	22nd	(England) Wayne Brown	17 May 2022	2022–23 English Football League
Hull City	(Northern Ireland) Grant McCann	Sacked	25 January 2022	19th	(Georgia (country)) Shota Arveladze	27 January 2022	19th
Sunderland	(England) Lee Johnson	Sacked	30 January 2022	3rd	(Scotland) Alex Neil	11 February 2022	4th
West Bromwich Albion	(France) Valérien Ismaël	Sacked	2 February 2022	5th	(England) Steve Bruce	3 February 2022	5th
Walsall	(England) Matthew Taylor	Sacked	9 February 2022	21st	(Wales) Michael Flynn	15 February 2022	18th
Bradford City	(Scotland) Derek Adams	Sacked	15 February 2022	11th	(Wales) Mark Hughes	24 February 2022	14th
Reading	(Serbia) Veljko Paunović	Mutual consent	19 February 2022	21st	(England) Paul Ince	16 May 2022	2022–23 English Football League
Peterborough United	(Scotland) Darren Ferguson	Resigned	20 February 2022	23rd	(Northern Ireland) Grant McCann	24 February 2022	23rd
Morecambe	(Northern Ireland) Stephen Robinson	Appointed by St Mirren	22 February 2022	21st	(Scotland) Derek Adams	24 February 2022	21st
Leyton Orient	(Wales) Kenny Jackett	Sacked	23 February 2022	18th	(England) Richie Wellens	9 March 2022	20th
Carlisle United	(England) Keith Millen	Mutual Consent	23 February 2022	23rd	(England) Paul Simpson	23 February 2022	23rd
Stevenage	(England) Paul Tisdale	Sacked	16 March 2022	22nd	(Scotland) Steve Evans	16 March 2022	22nd
Barrow	(England) Mark Cooper	Mutual consent	20 March 2022	21st	(England) Phil Brown	21 March 2022	21st
AFC Wimbledon	(England) Mark Robinson	Mutual consent	28 March 2022	21st	(Wales) Mark Bowen	30 March 2022	21st
Crewe Alexandra	(Gibraltar) David Artell	Sacked	11 April 2022	24th	(England) Alex Morris	28 April 2022	24th
Barnsley	(Sweden) Poya Asbaghi	Mutual consent	24 April 2022	24th	(Northern Ireland) Michael Duff	13 June 2022	2022–23 English Football League
