= 1938–39 Southern Football League =

The 1938–39 season was the 41st in the history of the Southern League. Colchester United won the title. Three clubs applied to join the Football League, although none were successful. The following season saw the league split into Eastern and Western sections as part an emergency war-time competition, after which the league was discontinued until the end of World War II.

== Final table ==
Southern Football League
- Season: 1938–39
- Champions: Colchester United (1st title)
- Promoted: none
- Matches: 506
- Goals: 1,855 (3.67 per match)

A total of 23 teams contest the division, including 17 sides from previous season, one team relegated from The Football League and five new teams.

Team relegated from 1937–38 Football League:

- Gillingham

Newly elected teams:

- Chelmsford City from the Essex County League
- Worcester City from the Birmingham & District League
- Arsenal II
- Cardiff City II
- Ipswich Town II from the Eastern Counties League

| Pos | Team | Pld | W | D | L | GF | GA | GR | Pts | Result (Note: Number of goals for and/or against is inaccurate.) |
|---|---|---|---|---|---|---|---|---|---|---|
| 1 | Colchester United | 44 | 31 | 5 | 8 | 110 | 37 | 2.973 | 67 | Left league at end of season |
| 2 | Guildford City | 44 | 30 | 6 | 8 | 126 | 52 | 2.423 | 66 | |
| 3 | Gillingham | 44 | 29 | 6 | 9 | 104 | 57 | 1.825 | 64 | Left league at end of season |
| 4 | Plymouth Argyle II | 44 | 26 | 5 | 13 | 128 | 63 | 2.032 | 57 | Left league at end of season |
| 5 | Yeovil & Petters United | 44 | 22 | 10 | 12 | 85 | 70 | 1.214 | 54 | |
| 6 | Arsenal II | 44 | 21 | 9 | 14 | 92 | 57 | 1.614 | 51 | Left league at end of season |
| 7 | Cardiff City II | 44 | 24 | 3 | 17 | 105 | 72 | 1.458 | 51 | Left league at end of season |
| 8 | Tunbridge Wells Rangers | 44 | 22 | 6 | 16 | 93 | 76 | 1.224 | 50 | |
| 9 | Norwich City II | 44 | 23 | 4 | 17 | 86 | 76 | 1.132 | 50 | |
| 10 | Chelmsford City | 44 | 18 | 8 | 18 | 74 | 73 | 1.014 | 44 | |
| 11 | Bath City | 44 | 16 | 12 | 16 | 58 | 74 | 0.784 | 44 | |
| 12 | Barry | 44 | 18 | 7 | 19 | 76 | 90 | 0.844 | 43 | |
| 13 | Cheltenham Town | 44 | 16 | 9 | 19 | 76 | 105 | 0.724 | 41 | |
| 14 | Ipswich Town II | 44 | 14 | 12 | 18 | 64 | 76 | 0.842 | 40 | Left league at end of season |
| 15 | Worcester City | 44 | 13 | 14 | 17 | 72 | 90 | 0.800 | 40 | |
| 16 | Folkestone | 44 | 16 | 6 | 22 | 74 | 85 | 0.871 | 38 | Left league at end of season |
| 17 | Newport County II | 44 | 13 | 10 | 21 | 74 | 108 | 0.685 | 36 | Left league at end of season |
| 18 | Exeter City II | 44 | 12 | 9 | 23 | 51 | 107 | 0.477 | 33 | Left league at end of season |
| 19 | Torquay United II | 44 | 12 | 8 | 24 | 53 | 89 | 0.596 | 32 | Left league at end of season |
| 20 | Swindon Town II | 44 | 11 | 9 | 24 | 66 | 101 | 0.653 | 31 | Left league at end of season |
| 21 | Aldershot II | 44 | 12 | 6 | 26 | 69 | 92 | 0.750 | 30 | Left league at end of season |
| 22 | Bristol Rovers II | 44 | 9 | 11 | 24 | 66 | 85 | 0.776 | 29 | Left league at end of season |
| 23 | Dartford | 44 | 8 | 5 | 31 | 53 | 119 | 0.445 | 21 | |

Rules for classification: The system of using goal average to separate two teams tied on points was used up until the 1976-77 season. The points system: 2 points for a win, 1 point for a draw and 0 points for losing.

== Football League election ==
Three Southern League clubs, Chelmsford City, Colchester United and Gillingham, applied to join the Football League. However, both League clubs were re-elected.

| Club | League | Votes |
|---|---|---|
| Bristol Rovers | Football League Third Division South | 45 |
| Walsall | Football League Third Division South | 36 |
| Gillingham | Southern League | 15 |
| Chelmsford City | Southern League | 1 |
| Colchester United | Southern League | 1 |
