= 2019–20 English Football League =

121st season of the English Football League

English Football League
- Season: 2019–20
- Champions: Leeds United
- Promoted: West Bromwich Albion; Fulham
- Relegated: Macclesfield Town
- Expelled: Bury
- New clubs in league: Leyton Orient; Salford City

The 2019–20 season was the 121st season of the English Football League (EFL) and the fourth season under that name after it was renamed from The Football League in 2016. For the seventh season running, the league was sponsored by Sky Betting & Gaming and was therefore known as the Sky Bet EFL.

The EFL is contested through three divisions: the Championship, League One and League Two. The winner and the runner-up of the Championship are automatically promoted to the Premier League along with the winner of the Championship play-off. Originally the bottom two teams in League Two were to be relegated to the National League, but because of the expulsion of Bury from League One, only the bottom team in League Two was relegated.

== Promotion and relegation ==
=== From the Premier League ===
Relegated to the Championship

- Cardiff City
- Fulham
- Huddersfield Town

=== From the Championship ===
Promoted to the Premier League

- Norwich City
- Sheffield United
- Aston Villa

Relegated to League One

- Rotherham United
- Bolton Wanderers
- Ipswich Town

=== From League One ===
Promoted to the Championship

- Luton Town
- Barnsley
- Charlton Athletic

Relegated to League Two

- Plymouth Argyle
- Walsall
- Scunthorpe United
- Bradford City

=== From League Two ===
Promoted to League One

- Lincoln City
- Bury
- Milton Keynes Dons
- Tranmere Rovers

Relegated to the National League

- Notts County
- Yeovil Town

=== From the National League ===
Promoted to League Two

- Leyton Orient
- Salford City

== Championship ==
=== Table ===
Pos	Team	Pld	W	D	L	GF	GA	GD	Pts	Promotion, qualification or relegation
1	Leeds United (C, P)	46	28	9	9	77	35	+42	93	Promotion to the Premier League
2	West Bromwich Albion (P)	46	22	17	7	77	45	+32	83	Promotion to the Premier League
3	Brentford	46	24	9	13	80	38	+42	81	Qualification for Championship play-offs (Note: Four teams play for one spot and promotion to the Premier League.)
4	Fulham (O, P)	46	23	12	11	64	48	+16	81	Qualification for Championship play-offs
5	Cardiff City	46	19	16	11	68	58	+10	73	Qualification for Championship play-offs
6	Swansea City	46	18	16	12	62	53	+9	70	Qualification for Championship play-offs
7	Nottingham Forest	46	18	16	12	58	50	+8	70	
8	Millwall	46	17	17	12	57	51	+6	68	
9	Preston North End	46	18	12	16	59	54	+5	66	
10	Derby County	46	17	13	16	62	64	−2	64	
11	Blackburn Rovers	46	17	12	17	66	63	+3	63	
12	Bristol City	46	17	12	17	60	65	−5	63	
13	Queens Park Rangers	46	16	10	20	67	76	−9	58	
14	Reading	46	15	11	20	59	58	+1	56	
15	Stoke City	46	16	8	22	62	68	−6	56	
16	Sheffield Wednesday	46	15	11	20	58	66	−8	56	
17	Middlesbrough	46	13	14	19	48	61	−13	53	
18	Huddersfield Town	46	13	12	21	52	70	−18	51	
19	Luton Town	46	14	9	23	54	82	−28	51	
20	Birmingham City	46	12	14	20	54	75	−21	50	
21	Barnsley	46	12	13	21	49	69	−20	49	
22	Charlton Athletic (R)	46	12	12	22	50	65	−15	48	Relegation to EFL League One
23	Wigan Athletic (R)	46	15	14	17	57	56	+1	47 (Note: As a result of Wigan Athletic entering administration, the club was subject to a 12-point deduction. In accordance with EFL regulations, the timing of the sporting sanction was only determined once final league placings in the Championship were determined. Since the club did not finish in the relegation places at the end of season, the sanction was applied to their 2019–20 total and final league standings were amended as appropriate.)	Relegation to EFL League One
24	Hull City (R)	46	12	9	25	57	87	−30	45	Relegation to EFL League One

Source: EFL Official Website
Rules for classification: 1) Points; 2) Goal difference; 3) Number of goals scored; 4) Head-to-head results; 5) Wins; 6) Away goals; 7) Penalty points (sec 9.5); 8) 12-point sending off offences
(C) Champions; (O) Play-off winners; (P) Promoted; (R) Relegated

=== Play-offs ===
Semi-finals
3	Brentford	0	3	3
6	Swansea City	1	1	2
4	Fulham	2	1	3
5	Cardiff City	0	2	2

Final
3	Brentford	1
4	Fulham	2

=== Results ===
Home \ Away	BAR	BIR	BLB	BRE	BRI	CAR	CHA	DER	FUL	HUD	HUL	LEE	LUT	MID	MIL	NOT	PNE	QPR	REA	SHW	STO	SWA	WBA	WIG
Barnsley	—	0–1	2–0	1–3	2–2	0–2	2–2	2–2	1–0	2–1	3–1	0–2	1–3	1–0	0–0	1–0	0–3	5–3	1–1	1–1	2–4	1–1	1–1	0–0
Birmingham City	2–0	—	1–0	1–1	1–1	1–1	1–1	1–3	0–1	0–3	3–3	4–5	2–1	2–1	1–1	2–1	0–1	0–2	1–3	3–3	2–1	1–3	2–3	2–3
Blackburn Rovers	3–2	1–1	—	1–0	3–1	0–0	1–2	1–0	0–1	2–2	3–0	1–3	1–2	1–0	2–0	1–1	1–1	2–1	4–3	2–1	0–0	2–2	1–1	0–0
Brentford	1–2	0–1	2–2	—	1–1	2–1	2–1	3–0	1–0	0–1	1–1	1–1	7–0	3–2	3–2	0–1	1–0	3–1	1–0	5–0	0–0	3–1	1–0	3–0
Bristol City	1–0	1–3	0–2	0–4	—	0–1	2–1	3–2	1–1	5–2	2–1	1–3	3–0	2–2	1–2	0–0	1–1	2–0	1–0	1–2	1–1	0–0	0–3	2–2
Cardiff City	3–2	4–2	2–3	2–2	0–1	—	0–0	2–1	1–1	2–1	3–0	2–0	2–1	1–0	1–1	0–1	0–0	3–0	1–1	1–1	1–0	0–0	2–1	2–2
Charlton Athletic	2–1	0–1	0–2	1–0	3–2	2–2	—	3–0	0–0	0–1	2–2	1–0	3–1	0–1	0–1	1–1	0–1	1–0	0–1	1–3	3–1	1–2	2–2	2–2
Derby County	2–1	3–2	3–0	1–3	1–2	1–1	2–1	—	1–1	1–1	1–0	1–3	2–0	2–0	0–1	1–1	1–0	1–1	2–1	1–1	4–0	0–0	1–1	1–0
Fulham	0–3	1–0	2–0	0–2	1–2	2–0	2–2	3–0	—	3–2	0–3	2–1	3–2	1–0	4–0	1–2	2–0	2–1	1–2	5–3	1–0	1–0	1–1	2–0
Huddersfield Town	2–1	1–1	2–1	0–0	2–1	0–3	4–0	1–2	1–2	—	3–0	0–2	0–2	0–0	1–1	2–1	0–0	2–0	0–2	0–2	2–5	1–1	2–1	0–2
Hull City	0–1	3–0	0–1	1–5	1–3	2–2	0–1	2–0	0–1	1–2	—	0–4	0–1	2–1	0–1	0–2	4–0	2–3	2–1	1–0	2–1	4–4	0–1	2–2
Leeds United	1–0	1–0	2–1	1–0	1–0	3–3	4–0	1–1	3–0	2–0	2–0	—	1–1	4–0	3–2	1–1	1–1	2–0	1–0	0–2	5–0	0–1	1–0	0–1
Luton Town	1–1	1–2	3–2	2–1	3–0	0–1	2–1	3–2	3–3	2–1	0–3	1–2	—	3–3	1–1	1–2	1–1	1–1	0–5	1–0	1–1	0–1	1–2	2–1
Middlesbrough	1–0	1–1	1–1	0–1	1–3	1–3	1–0	2–2	0–0	1–0	2–2	0–1	0–1	—	1–1	2–2	1–1	0–1	1–0	1–4	2–1	0–3	0–1	1–0
Millwall	1–2	0–0	1–0	1–0	1–1	2–2	2–1	2–3	1–1	4–1	1–1	2–1	3–1	0–2	—	2–2	1–0	1–2	2–0	1–0	2–0	1–1	0–2	2–2
Nottingham Forest	1–0	3–0	3–2	1–0	1–0	0–1	0–1	1–0	0–1	3–1	1–2	2–0	3–1	1–1	0–3	—	1–1	0–0	1–1	0–4	1–4	2–2	1–2	1–0
Preston North End	5–1	2–0	3–2	2–0	3–3	1–3	2–1	0–1	2–1	3–1	2–1	1–1	2–1	0–2	0–1	1–1	—	1–3	0–2	2–1	3–1	1–1	0–1	3–0
Queens Park Rangers	0–1	2–2	4–2	1–3	0–1	6–1	2–2	2–1	1–2	1–1	1–2	1–0	3–2	2–2	4–3	0–4	2–0	—	2–2	0–3	4–2	1–3	0–2	3–1
Reading	2–0	2–3	1–2	0–3	0–1	3–0	0–2	3–0	1–4	0–0	1–1	0–1	3–0	1–2	2–1	1–1	1–0	1–0	—	1–3	1–1	1–4	1–2	0–3
Sheffield Wednesday	2–0	1–1	0–5	2–1	1–0	1–2	1–0	1–3	1–1	0–0	0–1	0–0	1–0	1–2	0–0	1–1	1–3	1–2	0–3	—	1–0	2–2	0–3	1–0
Stoke City	4–0	2–0	1–2	1–0	1–2	2–0	3–1	2–2	2–0	0–1	5–1	0–3	3–0	0–2	0–0	2–3	0–2	1–2	0–0	3–2	—	2–0	0–2	2–1
Swansea City	0–0	3–0	1–1	0–3	1–0	1–0	1–0	2–3	1–2	3–1	2–1	0–1	0–1	3–1	0–1	0–1	3–2	0–0	1–1	2–1	1–2	—	0–0	2–1
West Bromwich Albion	2–2	0–0	3–2	1–1	4–1	4–2	2–2	2–0	0–0	4–2	4–2	1–1	2–0	0–2	1–1	2–2	2–0	2–2	1–1	2–1	0–1	5–1	—	0–1
Wigan Athletic	0–0	1–0	2–0	0–3	0–2	3–2	2–0	1–1	1–1	1–1	8–0	0–2	0–0	2–2	1–0	1–0	1–2	1–0	1–3	2–1	3–0	1–2	1–1	—

Source: EFL Official Website
Legend: Blue = home team win; Yellow = draw; Red = away team win.
For upcoming matches, an "a" indicates there is an article about the rivalry between the two participants.

== League One ==
=== Table ===
Pos	Team	Pld	W	D	L	GF	GA	GD	Pts	PPG	Promotion, qualification or relegation
1	Coventry City (C, P)	34	18	13	3	48	30	+18	67	1.97	Promotion to the EFL Championship
2	Rotherham United (P)	35	18	8	9	61	38	+23	62	1.77	Promotion to the EFL Championship
3	Wycombe Wanderers (O, P)	34	17	8	9	45	40	+5	59	1.74	Qualification for League One play-offs (Note: Four teams play for one spot and promotion to the EFL Championship.)
4	Oxford United	35	17	9	9	61	37	+24	60	1.71	Qualification for League One play-offs
5	Portsmouth	35	17	9	9	53	36	+17	60	1.71	Qualification for League One play-offs
6	Fleetwood Town	35	16	12	7	51	38	+13	60	1.71	Qualification for League One play-offs
7	Peterborough United	35	17	8	10	68	40	+28	59	1.69	
8	Sunderland	36	16	11	9	48	32	+16	59	1.64	
9	Doncaster Rovers	34	15	9	10	51	33	+18	54	1.59	
10	Gillingham	35	12	15	8	42	34	+8	51	1.46	
11	Ipswich Town	36	14	10	12	46	36	+10	52	1.44	
12	Burton Albion	35	12	12	11	50	50	0	48	1.37	
13	Blackpool	35	11	12	12	44	43	+1	45	1.29	
14	Bristol Rovers	35	12	9	14	38	49	−11	45	1.29	
15	Shrewsbury Town	34	10	11	13	31	42	−11	41	1.21	
16	Lincoln City	35	12	6	17	44	46	−2	42	1.20	
17	Accrington Stanley	35	10	10	15	47	53	−6	40	1.14	
18	Rochdale	34	10	6	18	39	57	−18	36	1.06	
19	Milton Keynes Dons	35	10	7	18	36	47	−11	37	1.06	
20	AFC Wimbledon	35	8	11	16	39	52	−13	35	1.00	
21	Tranmere Rovers (R)	34	8	8	18	36	60	−24	32	0.94	Relegation to EFL League Two
22	Southend United (R)	35	4	7	24	39	85	−46	19	0.54	Relegation to EFL League Two
23	Bolton Wanderers (R)	34	5	11	18	27	66	−39	14 (Note: Bolton Wanderers deducted 12 points for entering administration.)	0.41	Relegation to EFL League Two
24	Bury (E, R)	0	0	0	0	0	0	0	−12 (Note: Bury deducted 12 points for entering into an insolvency event, before later being expelled from the EFL on 27 August 2019. At the time of their expulsion, they had played no matches.)	—	Club expelled

Source: EFL Official Website
Rules for classification: 1) Points per game; 2) Goal difference; 3) Number of goals scored; 4) Head-to-head results; 5) Wins; 6) Away goals; 7) Penalty points (sec 9.5); 8) 12-point sending-off offences
(C) Champions; (E) Eliminated; (O) Play-off winners; (P) Promoted; (R) Relegated

=== Play-offs ===
Semi-finals
3	Wycombe Wanderers	4	2	6
6	Fleetwood Town	1	2	3
4	Oxford United	1	1	2 (5)
5	Portsmouth	1	1	2 (4)

final
3	Wycombe Wanderers	2
4	Oxford United	1

=== Results ===
Home \ Away	ACC	WIM	BLP	BOL	BRI	BRT	COV	DON	FLE	GIL	IPS	LIN	MKD	OXF	PET	POR	ROC	ROT	SHR	STD	SUN	TRA	WYC
Accrington Stanley	—	2–1	1–1	7–1		2–0				0–1	2–0	4–3	2–1	2–2	0–2	4–1	1–2	1–2	2–3	1–2	1–3	1–2	
AFC Wimbledon	1–1	—	0–0	0–0	1–3	2–2		2–1	1–2	1–0	0–0	1–1	a	1–2	1–0	1–0	3–2	1–2	1–1	1–1			0–0
Blackpool	0–1	2–0	—	2–1	2–0				3–1	2–3	2–1	2–1	0–3	2–1	4–3	1–1		1–2	0–1	2–1		1–2	1–1
Bolton Wanderers	0–0	2–2	0–0	—	1–1	3–4	0–0		2–1		0–5		1–0	0–0		0–1	1–3		1–1	3–2	1–1	2–0	0–2
Bristol Rovers	3–3	1–2	2–1	0–2	—		1–2	0–2	0–0	1–1			1–0	3–1	0–0	2–2		1–0	0–1	4–2	2–0	2–0	0–0
Burton Albion	1–1	1–0	0–0	2–2	2–0	—	0–0		1–0	0–0	0–1	0–2	1–0	2–2	1–1		3–1	0–1		1–1		4–2	
Coventry City	0–0	2–1	3–2	2–1	2–0		—	1–1	2–1	1–0	1–1	1–0	1–1			1–0	2–1	1–1		1–0	1–0	0–1	
Doncaster Rovers	1–1		0–1	2–1	2–0	2–2	0–1	—	3–2	1–1		2–1	1–1	1–0	2–0	1–2	1–1	2–1	2–0	3–1	1–2		3–1
Fleetwood Town	2–0	2–1	0–0		0–0	4–1	0–0	2–1	—	1–1	0–1		1–0	2–1	2–1	1–0	2–1		2–2		1–1	2–1	1–1
Gillingham		1–2	2–2	5–0		1–2		2–1		—	0–1	1–0	3–1	1–1	1–2	1–1	1–0	0–3	2–0	3–1	1–0		2–0
Ipswich Town	4–1	2–1	2–2		1–2	4–1	0–1	0–0	0–1	0–0	—	1–0		0–1	1–4			0–2	3–0		1–1	4–1	0–0
Lincoln City	2–0		1–0	5–1	0–1	3–2			2–0	0–0	5–3	—	1–1	0–6	2–1	0–2		0–1	0–0	4–0	2–0	1–0	
MK Dons		2–1		1–0	3–0	0–3	0–0	0–1			0–1	2–1	—	1–0	0–4	3–1	2–1	2–3	1–0	0–1	0–1	1–3	2–0
Oxford United	3–0	5–0	2–1			2–4	3–3	3–0		3–0	0–0	1–0		—	1–0		3–0	1–3	0–0	2–1	0–1	3–0	1–0
Peterborough United	4–0	3–2		1–0		1–0	2–2	0–3	1–3	0–0	2–2	2–0		4–0	—	2–0	6–0	2–1		4–0	3–0		4–0
Portsmouth		2–1		1–0		2–2	3–3		2–2	0–0	1–0	1–0	3–1	1–1	2–2	—	3–0	3–2	2–0	4–1	2–0	2–0	2–0
Rochdale	2–1		0–0	2–0	1–2		1–2	1–1	2–3	2–2	0–1	1–1	2–0			0–3	—	3–1	1–0		1–2		0–3
Rotherham United	1–0	2–2	2–1	6–1	3–0	3–2	4–0		2–2		1–0	0–2	1–1	1–2	4–0		0–1	—	0–0			1–1	0–1
Shrewsbury Town	0–2				3–4	0–0	2–1	1–0	0–3	1–1		1–1	1–1	2–3	1–0	1–0	0–0	1–2	—	4–3	1–0	2–3	
Southend United	0–1	1–4	1–3		3–1	2–3	0–2	1–7	3–3	0–1	1–3	2–1	2–2	0–4	0–2		0–3	2–2		—		0–0	
Sunderland		3–1	1–1	0–0	3–0	1–2	1–1	0–0	1–1	2–2	1–0	3–1	2–1	1–1		2–1	3–0	1–1		1–0	—	5–0	4–0
Tranmere Rovers	1–1	1–0	1–1	5–0	0–0	2–1	1–4	0–3		2–2	1–2				2–2	0–2	2–3		0–1	1–1	0–1	—	0–2
Wycombe Wanderers	1–1		2–1	2–0	3–1	2–0	1–4	1–0	0–1		1–1	3–1	3–2		3–3	1–0	2–1		1–0	4–3	1–0	3–1	—

Updated to match(es) played on 10 March 2020. Source: EFL Official Website
Legend: Blue = home team win; Yellow = draw; Red = away team win.
For upcoming matches, an "a" indicates there is an article about the rivalry between the two participants.

== League Two ==
=== Table ===
Pos	Team	Pld	W	D	L	GF	GA	GD	Pts	PPG	Promotion, qualification or relegation
1	Swindon Town (C, P)	36	21	6	9	62	39	+23	69	1.92	Promotion to EFL League One
2	Crewe Alexandra (P)	37	20	9	8	67	43	+24	69	1.86	Promotion to EFL League One
3	Plymouth Argyle (P)	37	20	8	9	61	39	+22	68	1.84	Promotion to EFL League One
4	Cheltenham Town	36	17	13	6	52	27	+25	64	1.78	Qualification for League Two play-offs (Note: Four teams play for one spot and promotion to EFL League One.)
5	Exeter City	37	18	11	8	53	43	+10	65	1.76	Qualification for League Two play-offs
6	Colchester United	37	15	13	9	52	37	+15	58	1.57	Qualification for League Two play-offs
7	Northampton Town (O, P)	37	17	7	13	54	40	+14	58	1.57	Qualification for League Two play-offs
8	Port Vale	37	14	15	8	50	44	+6	57	1.54	
9	Bradford City	37	14	12	11	44	40	+4	54	1.46	
10	Forest Green Rovers	36	13	10	13	43	40	+3	49	1.36	
11	Salford City	37	13	11	13	49	46	+3	50	1.35	
12	Walsall	36	13	8	15	40	49	−9	47	1.31	
13	Crawley Town	37	11	15	11	51	47	+4	48	1.30	
14	Newport County	36	12	10	14	32	39	−7	46	1.28	
15	Grimsby Town	37	12	11	14	45	51	−6	47	1.27	
16	Cambridge United	37	12	9	16	40	48	−8	45	1.22	
17	Leyton Orient	36	10	12	14	47	55	−8	42	1.17	
18	Carlisle United	37	10	12	15	39	56	−17	42	1.14	
19	Oldham Athletic	37	9	14	14	44	57	−13	41	1.11	
20	Scunthorpe United	37	10	10	17	44	56	−12	40	1.08	
21	Mansfield Town	36	9	11	16	48	55	−7	38	1.06	
22	Morecambe	37	7	11	19	35	60	−25	32	0.86	
23	Stevenage	36	3	13	20	24	50	−26	22	0.61	Reprieved from relegation (Note: As a result of Bury's expulsion from League One, only one team is relegated to maintain League Two at 24 teams.)
24	Macclesfield Town (R)	37	7	15	15	32	47	−15	19 (Note: Macclesfield Town were deducted a total of 17 points for various infractions. They were deducted six points for failing to both pay their players' wages and to fulfil a fixture, reduced to four points after appeal. A further seven-point deduction was given for failing to play December's match against Plymouth Argyle. A further two-point deduction was given for breaches of regulations over non-payment of wages. On 3 July the EFL appealed against the independent disciplinary panel's sanctions, and a further four points were deducted on 11 August 2020, resulting in Macclesfield Town being relegated.)	0.51	Relegation to the National League

Source: EFL Official Website
Rules for classification: 1) Points per game; 2) Goal difference; 3) Number of goals scored; 4) Head-to-head results; 5) Wins; 6) Away goals; 7) Penalty points (sec 9.5); 8) 12-point sending off offences
(C) Champions; (O) Play-off winners; (P) Promoted; (R) Relegated

=== Play-offs ===
Semi-finals
4	Cheltenham Town	2	0	2
7	Northampton Town	0	3	3
5	Exeter City	0	3	3
6	Colchester United	1	1	2

Final
7	Northampton Town	4
5	Exeter City	0

=== Results ===
Home \ Away	BRA	CAM	CAR	CHE	COL	CRA	CRE	EXE	FGR	GRI	LEY	MAC	MAN	MOR	NEW	NOR	OLD	PLY	POR	SAL	SCU	STE	SWI	WAL
Bradford City	—	0–0	3–1	1–1		2–1		2–0	0–1	1–1			2–0	1–0	1–0	2–1	3–0	2–1	1–2	1–1	2–2	3–1	2–1	
Cambridge United	2–1	—	1–2		2–1	2–1		4–0	0–1	0–0	2–3	2–2	2–3	1–0	0–0		1–2	1–0		0–4	3–2	0–4	0–1	
Carlisle United	0–0	0–0	—	0–1	0–3	2–1	2–4	1–3	0–0	0–0		2–1	0–2	2–2	2–0	0–2	1–0	0–3		2–2			1–1	2–1
Cheltenham Town	3–2	1–1	2–0	—	1–1		1–1		1–2		2–1	3–0	1–0	2–1		2–1	3–0	0–1	0–0		4–1	4–2	2–2	3–1
Colchester United	0–0	1–2	3–0	0–2	—	1–1		2–2		2–3	2–1	2–1		0–1	3–1	1–0		3–0	1–1	1–0		3–1	3–1	0–0
Crawley Town	2–1		0–0	1–0	2–1	—	1–2	0–1	1–1	3–2			1–0	1–1		4–0	3–0	2–2	0–0	2–0	3–1	2–0	0–4	2–3
Crewe Alexandra	2–1	2–3	4–1	1–0	0–0	2–1	—	1–1			2–0	2–0	1–1	5–0			2–1	0–3	0–1	4–1	3–1	3–1	3–1	1–0
Exeter City		2–0		0–0	0–0	1–1	1–1	—	1–0	1–3	2–2	1–0	1–0		1–0	3–2	5–1	4–0	2–0			2–1	1–1	3–3
Forest Green Rovers			1–4		1–0	3–1	0–0	0–1	—	1–0		1–0	2–2		0–2		1–0	0–1	2–3	1–2	0–2	0–0	2–2	1–2
Grimsby Town	1–1			0–0	2–2	1–1	0–2	0–1	2–2	—	0–4	1–0	0–1	2–1	4–2	0–3			5–2	1–0	0–1	3–1	0–3	
Leyton Orient	0–0	2–1	1–1	1–0	1–3	2–3	1–2		2–4	1–1	—	1–1	2–1		2–1	1–1	2–2		3–3		0–2	0–0	1–3	3–1
Macclesfield Town	1–1	1–0			1–1	1–1	1–1	2–3	2–1	1–1	3–0	—	0–0	0–1	1–1	0–1	1–1	1–1	2–1	0–2	1–0			
Mansfield Town	3–0	0–4	2–2	0–3	2–3				3–4	0–1	2–3		—	2–2	1–0	1–1	6–1	0–1	2–2	1–2	2–0	0–0		
Morecambe	1–2	1–1	1–1	0–0	1–1		1–1	2–3	0–2	0–2	1–0	2–0	1–1	—	2–1	2–2	1–2		2–1	2–2				0–1
Newport County	2–1	0–1	1–0	1–1		1–1	1–0	1–1			1–1	1–0	2–2	1–0	—		0–1	1–0	1–0	1–2	2–1	1–1	2–0	0–0
Northampton Town		2–0		1–1		2–2	4–1	2–0	1–0	2–0	0–1	1–2	1–2	4–1	2–0	—		3–1	0–1	2–0	3–0	1–0	0–1	0–1
Oldham Athletic	3–0		1–1	1–1	0–1	2–1	1–2	0–0	1–1	2–2	1–1	0–1	3–1	3–1	5–0	2–2	—			1–4	0–2			2–0
Plymouth Argyle	2–1	0–0	2–0	0–2	1–0	2–2	2–1			3–0	4–0	3–0	3–1	3–0	1–0		2–2	—		2–2	2–2	2–1	1–2	3–0
Port Vale		1–0	2–1	1–1	3–0			3–1	2–1		1–0	2–2	2–2	3–1		1–1	0–0	1–0	—	1–1	2–2	1–1	2–0	0–1
Salford City	2–0	1–0		0–2	1–2	0–0	3–1	0–1	0–4	1–0	1–1	0–0				1–2	1–1	2–3	1–1	—	1–1	2–0	2–3	1–2
Scunthorpe United	1–1	0–2	0–1	1–0	2–2	2–2	2–2	3–1	1–0	0–2				3–0	1–2	3–0	2–2	1–3	2–1		—	0–0	0–2	0–2
Stevenage	0–1	1–1	2–3		0–0	0–0	1–5	0–1	0–0	2–1	0–3	2–2		1–0		0–1	0–0	1–2	0–1	0–1		—		
Swindon Town	1–1	4–0	3–2		0–3		3–1	2–1	0–2	3–1		3–0	1–0	3–1	0–2	0–1	2–0	1–1	3–0		2–0	1–0	—	2–1
Walsall	0–1	2–1	1–2	1–2		2–1	1–2	3–1	1–1	1–3	1–0	1–1	1–2	0–2	0–0	3–2			2–2	0–3	1–0	0–0		—

Updated to match(es) played on 10 March 2020. Source: EFL Official Website
Legend: Blue = home team win; Yellow = draw; Red = away team win.
For upcoming matches, an "a" indicates there is an article about the rivalry between the two participants.

== Managerial changes ==
Team	Outgoing manager	Manner of departure	Date of vacancy	Position in table	Incoming manager	Date of appointment	Position in table
West Bromwich Albion	(Jamaica) Darren Moore	Sacked	9 March 2019	2018–19 season	(Croatia) Slaven Bilić	13 June 2019	Pre-season
Oldham Athletic	(England) Paul Scholes	Resigned	14 March 2019	2018–19 season	(France) Laurent Banide	11 June 2019	Pre-season
Scunthorpe United	(Scotland) Stuart McCall	Sacked	24 March 2019	2018–19 season	(England) Paul Hurst	13 May 2019	Pre-season
Queens Park Rangers	(England) Steve McClaren	Sacked	1 April 2019	2018–19 season	(England) Mark Warburton	9 May 2019	Pre-season
Walsall	(England) Dean Keates	Sacked	6 April 2019	2018–19 season	(England) Darrell Clarke	10 May 2019	Pre-season
Gillingham	(Wales) Steve Lovell	Sacked	26 April 2019	2018–19 season	(Scotland) Steve Evans	1 June 2019	Pre-season
Plymouth Argyle	(Scotland) Derek Adams	Sacked	28 April 2019	2018–19 season	(England) Ryan Lowe	5 June 2019	Pre-season
Brighton & Hove Albion	(Republic of Ireland) Chris Hughton	Sacked	13 May 2019	Pre-season	(England) Graham Potter	20 May 2019	Pre-season
Mansfield Town	(England) David Flitcroft	Sacked	14 May 2019	Pre-season	(Scotland) John Dempster	14 May 2019	Pre-season
Middlesbrough	(Wales) Tony Pulis	End of contract	17 May 2019	Pre-season	(England) Jonathan Woodgate	14 June 2019	Pre-season
Swansea City	(England) Graham Potter	Signed by Brighton & Hove Albion	20 May 2019	Pre-season	(Wales) Steve Cooper	13 June 2019	Pre-season
Bury	(England) Ryan Lowe	Signed by Plymouth Argyle	5 June 2019	Pre-season	(England) Paul Wilkinson	2 July 2019	Pre-season
Leyton Orient	(England) Justin Edinburgh	Deceased	8 June 2019	Pre-season	(Wales) Carl Fletcher	16 October 2019	17th
Hull City	(England) Nigel Adkins	End of contract	8 June 2019	Pre-season	(Northern Ireland) Grant McCann	21 June 2019	Pre-season
Birmingham City	(England) Garry Monk	Sacked	18 June 2019	Pre-season	(Spain) Pep Clotet	4 December 2019	15th
Doncaster Rovers	(Northern Ireland) Grant McCann	Signed by Hull City	21 June 2019	Pre-season	(Jamaica) Darren Moore	10 July 2019	Pre-season
Nottingham Forest	(Northern Ireland) Martin O’Neill	Sacked	28 June 2019	Pre-season	(France) Sabri Lamouchi	28 June 2019	Pre-season
Derby County	(England) Frank Lampard	Signed by Chelsea	4 July 2019	Pre-season	(Netherlands) Phillip Cocu	5 July 2019	Pre-season
Blackpool	(England) Terry McPhillips	Resigned	5 July 2019	Pre-season	(England) Simon Grayson	6 July 2019	Pre-season
Sheffield Wednesday	(England) Steve Bruce	Resigned	15 July 2019	Pre-season	(England) Garry Monk	6 September 2019	11th
Macclesfield Town	(England) Sol Campbell	Mutual consent	15 August 2019	8th	(Republic of Ireland) Daryl McMahon	19 August 2019	4th
Huddersfield Town	(Germany) Jan Siewert	Sacked	16 August 2019	20th	(England) Danny Cowley	9 September 2019	23rd
Bolton Wanderers	(England) Phil Parkinson	Resigned	22 August 2019	23rd	(England) Keith Hill	31 August 2019	23rd
Southend United	(England) Kevin Bond	Resigned	6 September 2019	22nd	(England) Sol Campbell	22 October 2019	22nd
Stevenage	(Tunisia) Dino Maamria	Sacked	9 September 2019	23rd	(England) Graham Westley	15 December 2019	23rd
Lincoln City	(England) Danny Cowley	Signed by Huddersfield Town	9 September 2019	5th	(England) Michael Appleton	20 September 2019	8th
Oldham Athletic	(France) Laurent Banide	Sacked	19 September 2019	21st	(Tunisia) Dino Maamria	19 September 2019	21st
Millwall	(England) Neil Harris	Resigned	3 October 2019	18th	(England) Gary Rowett	21 October 2019	17th
Barnsley	(Germany) Daniel Stendel	Sacked	8 October 2019	23rd	(Austria) Gerhard Struber	20 November 2019	24th
Sunderland	(Scotland) Jack Ross	Sacked	8 October 2019	6th	(England) Phil Parkinson	17 October 2019	6th
Reading	(Portugal) José Gomes	Sacked	9 October 2019	22nd	(Wales) Mark Bowen	14 October 2019	22nd
AFC Wimbledon	(England) Wally Downes	Mutual consent	20 October 2019	21st	(Wales) Glyn Hodges	23 October 2019	21st
Morecambe	(England) Jim Bentley	Signed by AFC Fylde	28 October 2019	24th	(Scotland) Derek Adams	7 November 2019	24th
Stoke City	(Wales) Nathan Jones	Sacked	1 November 2019	23rd	(Northern Ireland) Michael O'Neill	8 November 2019	24th
Milton Keynes Dons	(England) Paul Tisdale	Mutual consent	2 November 2019	21st	(Scotland) Russell Martin	3 November 2019	21st
Cardiff City	(England) Neil Warnock	Resigned	11 November 2019	14th	(England) Neil Harris	16 November 2019	14th
Carlisle United	(Scotland) Steven Pressley	Sacked	13 November 2019	19th	(England) Chris Beech	26 November 2019	21st
Leyton Orient	(Wales) Carl Fletcher	Sacked	14 November 2019	16th	(England) Ross Embleton	7 January 2020	19th
Grimsby Town	(England) Michael Jolley	Sacked	15 November 2019	18th	(England) Ian Holloway	31 December 2019	21st
Crawley Town	(Italy) Gabriele Cioffi	Mutual consent	2 December 2019	17th	(England) John Yems	5 December 2019	17th
Mansfield Town	(Scotland) John Dempster	Sacked	14 December 2019	18th	(Republic of Ireland) Graham Coughlan	17 December 2019	18th
Bristol Rovers	(Republic of Ireland) Graham Coughlan	Signed by Mansfield Town	17 December 2019	4th	(England) Ben Garner	23 December 2019	4th
Macclesfield Town	(Republic of Ireland) Daryl McMahon	Resigned	2 January 2020	22nd	(Republic of Ireland) Mark Kennedy	16 January 2020	22nd
Cambridge United	(Scotland) Colin Calderwood	Mutual consent	29 January 2020	18th	(England) Mark Bonner	9 March 2020	16th
Scunthorpe United	(England) Paul Hurst	Sacked	29 January 2020	15th	(England) Neil Cox	7 August 2020	2020–21 English Football League
Bradford City	(England) Gary Bowyer	Sacked	3 February 2020	8th	(Scotland) Stuart McCall	4 February 2020	8th
Blackpool	(England) Simon Grayson	Sacked	12 February 2020	15th	(England) Neil Critchley	2 March 2020	13th
Stevenage	(England) Graham Westley	Resigned	16 February 2020	24th	(England) Alex Revell	16 February 2020	24th
Luton Town	(England) Graeme Jones	Mutual consent	24 April 2020	23rd	(Wales) Nathan Jones	28 May 2020	23rd
Burton Albion	(England) Nigel Clough	Resigned	18 May 2020	12th	(England) Jake Buxton	18 May 2020	12th
Bolton Wanderers	(England) Keith Hill	End of contract	12 June 2020	23rd	(England) Ian Evatt	1 July 2020	23rd
Middlesbrough	(England) Jonathan Woodgate	Sacked	23 June 2020	21st	(England) Neil Warnock	23 June 2020	21st
Southend United	(England) Sol Campbell	Mutual consent	30 June 2020	22nd	(England) Mark Molesley	13 August 2020	2020–21 English Football League
Bristol City	(England) Lee Johnson	Sacked	4 July 2020	12th	(England) Dean Holden	10 August 2020	2020–21 English Football League
Tranmere Rovers	(Scotland) Micky Mellon	Signed by Dundee United	6 July 2020	21st	(England) Mike Jackson	18 July 2020	21st
Birmingham City	(Spain) Pep Clotet	Mutual consent	8 July 2020	20th	(Spain) Aitor Karanka	31 July 2020	20th
Colchester United	(England) John McGreal	Sacked	14 July 2020	6th	(England) Steve Ball	28 July 2020	6th
Huddersfield Town	(England) Danny Cowley	Sacked	19 July 2020	18th	(Spain) Carlos Corberán	23 July 2020	18th
