= 1949–50 Southern Football League =

Southern Football League
- Season: 1949–50
- Champions: Merthyr Tydfil
- Matches: 552
- Goals: 1,987 (3.6 per match)

The 1949–50 Southern Football League season was the 47th in the history of the league, an English football competition.

The league consisted of 24 clubs, including all 22 clubs from the previous season, and two newly elected clubs – Headington United and Weymouth. Merthyr Tydfil were champions, winning their second Southern League title. At the end of the season the Football League expanded from 88 to 92 clubs. Six Southern League clubs applied to join, with Colchester United and Gillingham succeeding.

== League table ==
Pos	Team	Pld	W	D	L	GF	GA	GR	Pts	Results
1	Merthyr Tydfil	46	34	3	9	143	62	2.306	71	
2	Colchester United	46	31	9	6	109	51	2.137	71	Elected to the Football League Third Division South
3	Yeovil Town	46	29	7	10	104	45	2.311	65	
4	Chelmsford City	46	26	9	11	121	64	1.891	61	
5	Gillingham	46	23	9	14	92	61	1.508	55	Elected to the Football League Third Division South
6	Dartford	46	20	9	17	70	65	1.077	49	
7	Worcester City	46	21	7	18	85	80	1.063	49	
8	Guildford City	46	18	11	17	79	73	1.082	47	
9	Weymouth	46	19	9	18	80	81	0.988	47	
10	Barry Town	46	18	10	18	78	72	1.083	46	
11	Exeter City II	46	16	14	16	73	83	0.880	46	
12	Lovells Athletic	46	17	10	19	86	78	1.103	44	
13	Tonbridge	46	16	12	18	65	76	0.855	44	
14	Hastings United	46	17	8	21	92	140	0.657	42	
15	Gravesend & Northfleet	46	16	9	21	88	81	1.086	41	
16	Torquay United II	46	14	12	20	80	89	0.899	40	
17	Bath City	46	16	7	23	61	78	0.782	39	
18	Gloucester City	46	14	11	21	72	101	0.713	39	
19	Hereford United	46	15	8	23	74	76	0.974	38	
20	Headington United	46	13	11	22	75	96	0.781	37	
21	Cheltenham Town	46	15	7	24	72	97	0.742	37	
22	Bedford Town	46	12	11	23	63	79	0.797	35	
23	Kidderminster Harriers	46	12	11	23	64	108	0.593	35	
24	Chingford Town	46	10	6	30	63	151	0.417	26	

Source: rsssf.com
Rules for classification: 1) points; 2) goal ratio.

== Football League elections ==
As the Football League's Division Three South was expanded from 20 to 22 clubs, no League clubs put up for re-election, but two places were available for non-League clubs. Six Southern League clubs applied, with Gillingham and Colchester United topping the ballot, despite Merthyr winning the league.

Club	League	Votes
Gillingham	Southern League	44
Colchester United	Southern League	28
Worcester City	Southern League	11
Chelmsford City	Southern League	8
Peterborough United	Midland League	5
Merthyr Tydfil	Southern League	1
Yeovil Town	Southern League	1
Llanelly	Welsh National League (South)	0
Cradley Heath	Birmingham & District League	0
Nuneaton Borough	Worcestershire Combination	0

== Southern League Cup ==
Colchester United won the Southern League Cup, beating Bath City 6–4 on aggregate in the final.
