= 1990–91 Football Conference =

Football Conference
- Season: 1990–91
- Champions: Barnet (1st Football Conference title)
- Promoted to the Football League: Barnet
- Conference League Cup winners: Sutton United
- FA Trophy winners: Wycombe Wanderers
- Relegated to Level 6: Fisher Athletic, Sutton United
- Matches: 462
- Goals: 1,364 (2.95 per match)
- Top goalscorer: Gary Bull (Barnet), 30
- Biggest home win: Altrincham – Merthyr Tydfil 9–2 (16 February 1991); Barnet – Fisher Athletic 8–1 (16 October 1990); Merthyr Tydfil – Fisher Athletic 7–0 (24 November 1990)
- Biggest away win: Gateshead – Sutton 0–9 (22 September 1990)
- Highest scoring: Altrincham – Merthyr Tydfil 9–2 (16 February 1991); Barnet – Fisher Athletic 8–1 (16 October 1990); Yeovil Town –Slough Town 7–2 (6 April 1991); Welling United – Northwich Victoria 4–5 (29 September 1990); Gateshead – Sutton 0–9 (22 September 1990)
- Longest winning run: Barnet, Kettering Town, 7 matches
- Longest unbeaten run: Altrincham, 28 matches
- Longest losing run: Yeovil Town, 7 matches
- Highest attendance: Colchester United v Altrincham, 7,221 (20 April 1991)
- Lowest attendance: ?
- Average attendance: 1,415 (– 0.09% compared to previous season)

The Football Conference season of 1990–91 (known as the GM Vauxhall Conference for sponsorship reasons) was the twelfth season of the Football Conference.

== Overview ==
Barnet finished the season as Conference champions and were promoted to the Football League Fourth Division, finishing narrowly ahead of Colchester United, who had been relegated to the Conference a year earlier.

There was no relegation from the Fourth Division to the Conference this year, due to expansion of the Football League.

== New teams in the league this season ==
- Bath City (promoted 1989–90)
- Colchester United (relegated from the Football League 1989–90)
- Gateshead (promoted 1989–90)
- Slough Town (promoted 1989–90)

== Final league table ==
Pos	Team	Pld	W	D	L	GF	GA	GD	Pts	Promotion or relegation
1	Barnet (C, P)	42	26	9	7	103	52	+51	87	Promotion to the Football League Fourth Division
2	Colchester United	42	25	10	7	68	35	+33	85	
3	Altrincham	42	23	13	6	87	46	+41	82	
4	Kettering Town	42	23	11	8	67	45	+22	80	
5	Wycombe Wanderers	42	21	11	10	75	46	+29	74	
6	Telford United	42	20	7	15	62	52	+10	67	
7	Macclesfield Town	42	17	12	13	63	52	+11	63	
8	Runcorn	42	16	10	16	69	67	+2	58	
9	Merthyr Tydfil	42	16	9	17	62	61	+1	57	
10	Barrow	42	15	12	15	59	65	−6	57	
11	Welling United	42	13	15	14	55	57	−2	54	
12	Northwich Victoria	42	13	13	16	65	75	−10	52	
13	Kidderminster Harriers	42	14	10	18	56	67	−11	52	
14	Yeovil Town	42	13	11	18	58	58	0	50	
15	Stafford Rangers	42	12	14	16	48	51	−3	50	
16	Cheltenham Town	42	12	12	18	54	72	−18	48	
17	Gateshead	42	14	6	22	52	92	−40	48	
18	Boston United	42	12	11	19	55	69	−14	47	
19	Slough Town	42	13	6	23	51	80	−29	45	
20	Bath City	42	10	12	20	55	61	−6	42	
21	Sutton United (R)	42	10	9	23	62	82	−20	39	Relegation to the Isthmian League Premier Division
22	Fisher Athletic (R)	42	5	15	22	38	79	−41	30	Relegation to the Southern League Premier Division

(C) Champions; (P) Promoted; (R) Relegated

== Results ==
Home \ Away	ALT	BAR	BRW	BAT	BOS	CHL	COL	FIS	GAT	KET	KID	MAC	MER	NOR	RUN	SLO	STA	SUT	TEL	WEL	WYC	YEO
Altrincham		4–1	1–1	2–0	1–1	3–0	2–2	0–0	4–1	3–2	1–2	5–2	9–2	0–2	1–0	3–0	0–0	4–1	2–1	0–1	1–0	2–2
Barnet	0–0		3–1	2–0	5–0	2–1	1–3	8–1	1–1	0–1	2–3	3–1	2–3	1–1	2–0	6–1	2–0	1–0	0–0	1–1	2–2	1–0
Barrow	1–0	4–2		1–1	1–1	0–0	2–2	3–1	3–1	0–1	1–3	1–1	0–2	2–2	2–1	2–1	2–0	3–1	2–1	1–1	2–2	1–0
Bath City	2–3	1–4	1–1		1–0	2–0	1–2	0–1	3–0	3–3	4–1	0–2	0–0	4–1	6–1	4–0	0–1	2–2	0–1	2–1	1–2	2–1
Boston United	2–6	1–3	0–2	3–0		2–1	1–3	4–1	5–1	1–2	3–1	1–1	3–0	4–1	2–2	0–1	0–2	2–2	2–1	0–0	0–1	4–0
Cheltenham Town	1–4	1–4	3–1	0–0	5–0		1–2	0–0	1–0	2–2	0–0	2–2	0–1	1–1	1–3	2–0	1–2	3–2	0–1	3–0	1–0	1–0
Colchester United	1–1	0–0	1–0	2–0	3–1	3–1		2–1	3–0	3–1	2–0	1–0	3–1	4–0	2–2	2–1	2–0	1–0	2–0	2–1	2–2	0–1
Fisher Athletic	0–0	2–4	1–2	0–3	1–2	1–1	0–0		0–2	0–0	1–1	1–2	0–0	5–2	0–1	1–1	1–3	1–1	2–0	1–1	2–3	2–1
Gateshead	0–3	1–3	5–1	2–0	0–1	3–3	1–2	1–0		1–2	2–1	1–1	1–0	0–4	3–1	1–0	2–1	0–9	5–1	0–3	2–1	1–1
Kettering Town	1–1	1–3	2–0	1–1	1–1	5–1	1–0	3–2	1–0		4–1	2–0	2–0	1–0	3–0	0–0	2–0	5–2	2–5	0–0	0–1	1–1
Kidderminster Harriers	0–1	0–3	3–1	3–2	3–3	2–0	0–0	3–3	2–3	3–0		0–0	1–2	3–1	3–1	1–2	2–1	1–0	1–3	1–2	1–2	0–0
Macclesfield Town	0–1	3–2	3–0	3–1	2–0	5–1	1–0	1–1	4–0	1–2	0–0		0–1	1–2	2–1	1–2	2–1	4–2	1–2	2–1	0–0	2–1
Merthyr Tydfil	0–2	1–1	0–2	0–0	2–0	3–0	3–0	7–0	3–1	1–3	1–2	0–2		3–2	0–0	3–0	1–1	3–0	2–3	1–0	2–4	1–1
Northwich Victoria	1–1	0–2	2–2	2–0	3–1	5–2	2–2	0–0	3–2	0–1	1–1	4–1	0–3		1–4	1–0	1–1	1–0	2–4	1–2	1–1	2–0
Runcorn	1–3	3–2	3–1	1–1	2–1	2–2	0–3	5–1	2–0	2–1	5–1	1–2	2–1	2–1		3–1	1–0	5–1	0–0	2–3	1–1	0–3
Slough Town	3–3	1–3	3–0	2–0	2–0	0–3	0–2	1–0	1–1	0–3	0–0	0–1	1–2	2–4	2–1		2–1	1–2	2–0	3–0	3–3	2–0
Stafford Rangers	2–1	2–2	2–2	2–1	1–2	2–2	0–2	2–0	0–1	0–0	3–1	2–2	2–0	0–0	1–1	3–4		1–2	1–1	1–0	2–1	1–1
Sutton United	1–2	0–1	2–1	1–1	0–0	2–3	0–1	3–1	3–3	1–2	1–2	3–1	1–1	2–2	1–3	5–2	0–3		0–3	1–1	1–0	1–0
Telford United	1–2	1–1	0–1	2–2	1–0	1–2	2–0	3–1	1–2	0–1	1–0	1–2	3–1	1–0	2–0	2–1	0–0	4–2		2–1	1–0	1–2
Welling United	2–2	1–4	4–2	2–1	0–0	0–0	1–1	1–1	6–0	0–0	1–0	0–0	2–1	4–5	2–2	2–0	2–1	1–2	1–1		1–1	0–3
Wycombe Wanderers	3–0	1–3	2–1	0–0	3–0	0–2	1–0	2–0	4–0	5–1	2–3	0–0	2–1	3–0	1–1	2–1	3–0	4–1	3–2	4–1		2–0
Yeovil Town	2–3	1–4	0–3	3–2	1–1	4–0	2–0	0–1	4–1	0–1	2–0	2–1	3–3	1–1	1–0	7–2	0–0	2–1	1–2	0–1	2–2	

Updated to match(es) played on unknown. Source: Rothmans Football Yearbook 1991–92. Queen Anne Press, Macdonald Futura Publishers, London & Sydney, 1991.
Legend: Blue = home team win; Yellow = draw; Red = away team win.
Locations of the Football Conference teams 1990–1991
Locations of the Football Conference teams 1990–1991

== Top scorers in order of league goals ==
Rank	Player	Club	League	FA Cup	FA Trophy	League Cup	Total
1	(England) Gary Bull	Barnet	30	2	0	0	32
2	(England) Mark West	Wycombe Wanderers	24	6	3	0	33
3	(England) Ken McKenna	Altrincham	22	3	3	2	30
4	(England) Mark Carter	Barnet	19	0	1	1	21
=	(England) Paul Randall	Bath City	19	0	3	0	22
6	(England) Colin Cowperthwaite	Barrow	18	0	1	2	21
=	(England) Terry Robbins	Welling United	18	2	0	1	21
8	(England) Mario Walsh	Colchester United	17	0	1	0	18
9	(England) Paul Cavell	Boston United	16	5	2	1	24
=	(England) Nicky Evans	Barnet	16	5	0	0	21
11	(England) Charlie Butler	Gateshead	15	0	0	1	16
=	(England) Peter Howell	Kidderminster Harriers	15	0	4	1	20
13	(England) John Askey	Macclesfield Town	14	0	0	0	14
=	(England) John Brady	Altrincham	14	1	2	0	17
=	(England) Kim Casey	Cheltenham Town	14	2	1	0	17

== Promotion and relegation ==
=== Promoted ===
- Barnet (to the Football League Fourth Division)
- Farnborough Town (from the Southern Premier League)
- Redbridge Forest (from the Isthmian League)
- Witton Albion (from the Northern Premier League)

=== Relegated ===
- Fisher Athletic (to the Southern Premier League)
- Sutton United (to the Isthmian League)
