= 1937–38 Southern Football League =

The 1937–38 season was the 40th in the history of the Southern League. Guildford City won the title. Ipswich Town were again the only Southern League club to apply for election to the Football League, and this time were successful.

== Final table ==
Southern Football League
- Season: 1937–38
- Champions: Guildford City (1st title)
- Promoted: Ipswich Town
- Relegated: none
- Matches: 306
- Goals: 1,212 (3.96 per match)

A total of 18 teams contest the division, including 15 sides from previous season and three new teams.

Newly elected teams:

- Colchester United from the Eastern Counties League
- Bristol Rovers II from the Birmingham & District League
- Swindon Town II from the Western League

Pos	Team	Pld	W	D	L	GF	GA	GR	Pts	Qualification
1	Guildford City	34	22	5	7	94	60	1.567	49	
2	Plymouth Argyle II	34	18	9	7	98	58	1.690	45	
3	Ipswich Town	34	19	6	9	89	54	1.648	44	Elected to Football League Third Division South
4	Yeovil & Petters United	34	14	14	6	72	45	1.600	42	
5	Norwich City II	34	15	11	8	77	55	1.400	41	
6	Colchester United	34	15	8	11	90	58	1.552	38	
7	Bristol Rovers II	34	14	8	12	63	62	1.016	36	
8	Swindon Town II	34	14	7	13	70	76	0.921	35	
9	Tunbridge Wells Rangers	34	14	6	14	68	74	0.919	34	
10	Aldershot II	34	10	12	12	42	55	0.764	32	
11	Cheltenham Town	34	13	5	16	72	68	1.059	31	
12	Exeter City II	34	13	5	16	71	75	0.947	31	
13	Dartford	34	9	11	14	51	70	0.729	29	
14	Bath City	34	9	9	16	45	65	0.692	27	
15	Folkestone	34	10	6	18	58	82	0.707	26	
16	Newport County II	34	10	6	18	56	86	0.651	26	
17	Barry	34	8	7	19	50	88	0.568	23	
18	Torquay United II	34	8	7	19	46	81	0.568	23	

Rules for classification: The system of using goal average to separate two teams tied on points was used up until the 1976-77 season. The points system: 2 points for a win, 1 point for a draw and 0 points for losing.

== Football League election ==
Ipswich Town were the only non-League club to apply for election to the Football League Third Division South. Having been unsuccessful the previous season, this time they won more votes than both Football League clubs, the first time a non-League club had topped an admission ballot since 1920.

Club	League	Votes
Ipswich Town	Southern League	36
Walsall	Football League Third Division South	34
Gillingham	Football League Third Division South	24
