= 1939–40 Southern Football League =

The 1939–40 season was the 42nd in the history of the Southern League. The league was split into two sections, Eastern and Western as part of an emergency war-time competition. Chelmsford City won the Eastern Section and Lovell's Athletic won the Western one. A championship play-off between the two clubs was drawn 3–3 and they were declared joint champions. After this season, the Southern Football League did not resume until World War II had ended in 1945.

== Eastern Section ==
Southern Football League Eastern Division
- Season: 1939–40
- Matches: 18
- Goals: 102 (5.67 per match)

Pos	Team	Pld	W	D	L	GF	GA	GR	Pts	Result
1	Chelmsford City	7	5	0	2	29	9	3.222	10	
2	Guildford City	8	4	1	3	26	13	2.000	9	Did not return to league after World War II
3	Tunbridge Wells Rangers	7	2	3	2	21	16	1.313	7	Did not return to league after World War II
4	Dartford	7	2	1	4	17	30	0.567	5	Did not return to league after World War II
5	Norwich City II	7	2	1	4	9	34	0.265	5	Did not return to league after World War II

Rules for classification: The system of using goal average to separate two teams tied on points was used until the 1976-77 season. The points system: 2 points for a win, 1 point for a draw and 0 points for losing.

== Western Section ==
Southern Football League Western Division
- Season: 1939–40
- Matches: 55
- Goals: 291 (5.29 per match)

The Western Section featured three new clubs:

- Gloucester City
- Hereford United
- Lovell's Athletic

Pos	Team	Pld	W	D	L	GF	GA	GR	Pts	Result
1	Lovell's Athletic	14	11	1	2	53	22	2.409	23	Did not return to league after World War II
2	Worcester City	14	9	2	3	55	30	1.833	20	
3	Hereford United	14	8	0	6	45	31	1.452	16	
4	Yeovil & Petters United	14	7	2	5	30	24	1.250	16	
5	Gloucester City	14	5	0	9	35	49	0.714	10	Did not return to league after World War II
6	Barry	14	4	1	9	31	56	0.554	9	
7	Cheltenham Town	13	3	2	8	21	38	0.553	8	
8	Bath City	13	3	2	8	21	41	0.512	8	

Rules for classification: The system of using goal average to separate two teams tied on points was used until the 1976-77 season. The points system: 2 points for a win, 1 point for a draw and 0 points for losing.
