= EFL Golden Glove =

Award for goalkeepers in the English Football League

The EFL Golden Glove, formerly Football League Golden Glove, is an annual association football award, given to the goalkeeper who has kept the most clean sheets in each of the three EFL divisions. Originally, clean sheets in the league (Championship, League One and League Two), EFL Cup, EFL Trophy and FA Cup all counted towards the Golden Glove but, since 2018, only non-playoff league fixtures qualify.

The award was first given after the 2006–07 season, with sponsorship from Puma. Macron, the official kits and ball supplier of the Football League, later sponsored the award. In the 2010–11 season no Golden Glove award was given. The 2011–12 season saw the introduction of a monthly award in addition to an annual award under new sponsors Precision Training. In 2018, the EFL and sponsors Sky Bet announced the return of the award.

== Winners ==
=== Seasonal awards ===
Season	Division	Player	Club	Clean Sheets	Games	Games per clean Sheet	Source
Puma Golden Glove
2006–07	Championship	(England) Matt Murray	Wolverhampton Wanderers	17	47	2.76	
2006–07	League One	(Republic of Ireland) Joe Murphy	Scunthorpe United	24	52	2.17	
2006–07	League Two	(England) Steve Phillips	Bristol Rovers	28	56	2	
2007–08	Championship	(Republic of Ireland) Dean Kiely	West Bromwich Albion	18	53	2.94	
2007–08	League One	(England) Paul Smith	Nottingham Forest	25	52	2.08	
2007–08	League Two	(France) Willy Guéret	Milton Keynes Dons	23	52	2.26	
2008–09	Championship	(Czech Republic) Radek Černý	Queens Park Rangers	19	47	2.47	
2008–09	Championship	(Republic of Ireland) Paddy Kenny	Sheffield United	19	47	2.47	
2008–09	League One	(Wales) Danny Coyne	Tranmere Rovers	20	47	2.35	
2008–09	League Two	(England) Ben Hamer	Brentford	20	49	2.45	
Macron Golden Glove
2009–10	Championship	(Netherlands) Dorus de Vries	Swansea City	25	48	1.92	
2009–10	League One	(England) Fraser Forster	Norwich City	22	46	2.09	
2009–10	League Two	(Denmark) Kasper Schmeichel	Notts County	24	48	2	
Precision Goalkeeping Golden Glove
2011–12	Championship	(Australia) Adam Federici	Reading	20	47	2.35	
2011–12	League One	(England) Chris Day	Stevenage	18	49	2.72	
2011–12	League Two	(England) Wes Foderingham	Swindon Town	23	40	1.74	
Sky Bet Golden Glove
2017–18	Championship	(England) John Ruddy	Wolverhampton Wanderers	24	45	1.88	
2017–18	League One	(England) Christian Walton	Wigan Athletic	19	31	1.63	
2017–18	League Two	(England) Aaron Chapman	Accrington Stanley	18	45	2.5	
2018–19	Championship	(England) Dean Henderson	Sheffield United	21	46	2.19	
2018–19	League One	(Wales) Adam Davies	Barnsley	19	42	2.21	
2018–19	League One	(England) James Shea	Luton Town	19	41	2.16	
2018–19	League Two	(England) Scott Davies	Tranmere Rovers	19	46	2.42	
2019–20	Championship	(Poland) Bartosz Bialkowski	Millwall	16	45	2.81	
2019–20	Championship	(Spain) David Raya	Brentford	16	46	2.87	
2019–20	League One	(England) Christy Pym	Peterborough United	15	35	2.3	
2019–20	League Two	(England) Alex Palmer	Plymouth Argyle	14	37	2.64	
2020–21	Championship	(England) Freddie Woodman	Swansea City	20	45	2.25	
2020–21	League One	(Wales) Chris Maxwell	Blackpool	21	43	2.05	
2020–21	League Two	(Czech Republic) Václav Hladký	Salford City	21	46	2.19	
2021–22	Championship	(Republic of Ireland) Mark Travers	AFC Bournemouth	20	45	2.25	
2021–22	League One	(England) Michael Cooper	Plymouth Argyle	18	46	2.56	
2021–22	League One	(England) David Stockdale	Wycombe Wanderers	18	46	2.56	
2021–22	League Two	(England) Liam Roberts	Northampton Town	21	46	2.19	
2022–23	Championship	(England) Ben Wilson	Coventry City	20	43	2.15	
2022–23	League One	(England) Christian Walton	Ipswich Town	23	46	2	
2022–23	League Two	(Chile) Lawrence Vigouroux	Leyton Orient	24	44	1.83	
2023–24	Championship	(France) Illan Meslier	Leeds United	18	44	2.45	
2023–24	Championship	(England) Alex Palmer	West Bromwich Albion	18	46	2.56	
2023–24	League One	(England) Joe Wildsmith	Derby County	20	40	2	
2023–24	League Two	(England) Ben Hinchliffe	Stockport County	17	46	2.71	
2024–25	Championship	(England) James Trafford	Burnley	29	45	1.55	
2024–25	League One	(England) Ryan Allsop	Birmingham City	21	38	1.81	
2024–25	League Two	(England) Owen Goodman	AFC Wimbledon	21	46	2.19	
2024–25	League Two	(England) Matt Macey	Colchester United	21	46	2.19	
2025–26	Championship	(England) Carl Rushworth	Coventry City	17	46	2.71	
2025–26	League One	(Republic of Ireland) Josh Keeley	Luton Town	11			
2025–26	League One	(England) Nathan Trott	Cardiff City	11			
2025–26	League Two	(England) Mathew Hudson	Oldham Athletic	19			

=== 2011–12 monthly awards ===
In addition to the annual award, the 2011–12 season saw the introduction of a monthly award, given to the best performing goalkeeper in the Football League across all three divisions. The monthly award was also known as the "Precision Goalkeeping Golden Glove Award". The monthly goalkeeping awards were scrapped after one season.

Month	Player	Club
October	(Wales) Boaz Myhill	Birmingham City
November	(England) Chris Day	Stevenage
December	(England) Ryan Clarke	Oxford United
January	(England) Ben Hamer	Charlton Athletic
February	(Australia) Adam Federici	Reading
March	(England) Kelvin Davis	Southampton
April	(England) Wes Foderingham	Swindon Town
