= Luton Town F.C. league record by opponent =

Luton Town's first-team competed in the Southern League during the 1909–10 season. Club captain Robert Hawkes, who had become Luton's first international player in 1907, is sitting in the centre of this picture; first to his right is Fred Hawkes (no relation), a player who went on to represent Luton 549 times.

Luton Town Football Club is an English football club based in Luton, Bedfordshire, which competes in the Championship, the second tier of English football, for the 2020–21 season. Formed in 1885 as the product of a merger, Luton Town became the first professional team in the south of England six years later and joined the Football League in 1897. After leaving the League in 1900 because of financial difficulties, Luton Town settled at their Kenilworth Road ground in 1905 and competed in the Southern League until 1920, when the club rejoined the Football League. The team was relegated to the Football Conference in 2009, after 89 consecutive years of League membership, following a 30-point deduction imposed by the football authorities. Five seasons later, the club won promotion back to the Football League.

Luton Town's first team has competed in a number of nationally contested leagues, and its record against each club faced in these competitions is listed below. The team that the club has met most in league competition is Queens Park Rangers, against whom Luton Town have contested 117 league matches; having lost 46 of these matches, the side has lost more league games to Queens Park Rangers than to any other club. The club against whom Luton Town have recorded the most league victories is Watford, whom the Bedfordshire club have beaten 45 times out of 103 league meetings. Luton have drawn more matches with Millwall than with any other club;^{[K]} out of the 107 league matches between the two teams, 34 have finished without a winner.

== Key ==
- The records include the results of matches played in the Southern Football League (from 1894 to 1896, and then again from 1900 to 1920), the United League (from 1896 to 1897), the Football League (from 1897 to 1900, 1920 to 2009 and then again from 2014 to the present day) and the Football Conference (from 2009 to 2014). Play-off matches are not included.
- For simplicity, present-day names are used throughout: for example, results against Newton Heath, Millwall Athletic and Woolwich Arsenal are integrated into the records against Manchester United, Millwall and Arsenal, respectively.
- The season given as the "first" denotes the season in which Luton Town first played a league match against that team.
- The season given as the "last" designates the most recent season to have included a league match between Luton Town and that side. Current divisional rivals that the club has never met in the league have a blank entry, indicating that the first league meeting of the season has not yet taken place.
- ^{†} Teams with this background and symbol in the "Club" column are current divisional rivals of Luton Town.
- ^{‡} Clubs with this background and symbol in the "Club" column are defunct.
- P = matches played; W = matches won; D = matches drawn; L = matches lost; Win% = percentage of total matches won

== All-time league record ==
Statistics are correct as of match played 6 February 2021.^{[a]}

Club	Home				Away				Total				Win%	First	Last	Notes
Club	P	W	D	L	P	W	D	L	P	W	D	L	Win%	First	Last	Notes
Aberdare Athletic ^{‡}	8	5	2	1	8	4	1	3	16	9	3	4	56.25	1912–13	1926–27	
Abertillery ^{‡}	1	1	0	0	1	1	0	0	2	2	0	0	100.00	1913–14	1913–14	
Accrington Stanley	6	3	0	3	6	3	3	0	12	6	3	3	50.00	2008–09	2018–19	
AFC Bournemouth ^{†}	28	13	8	7	28	7	7	14	56	20	15	21	35.71	1923–24	2020–21	^{[A]}
AFC Telford United	2	0	1	1	2	1	1	0	4	1	2	1	25.00	2011–12	2012–13	
AFC Wimbledon	5	2	1	2	5	1	2	2	10	3	3	4	30.00	2009–10	2018–19	
Aldershot ^{‡}	8	6	2	0	8	4	2	2	16	10	4	2	62.50	1932–33	1966–67	
Aldershot Town	2	2	0	0	2	0	1	1	4	2	1	1	50.00	2008–09	2013–14	
Alfreton Town	3	3	0	0	3	1	1	1	6	4	1	1	66.67	2011–12	2013–14	
Altrincham	2	1	1	0	2	2	0	0	4	3	1	0	75.00	2009–10	2010–11	
Arsenal	20	6	7	7	20	2	1	17	40	8	8	24	20.00	1896–97	1991–92	^{[B]}
Aston Villa	16	12	3	1	16	5	1	10	32	17	4	11	53.13	1937–38	1991–92	
Barnet	5	5	0	0	5	2	1	2	10	7	1	2	70.00	2008–09	2017–18	
Barnsley ^{†}	28	14	7	7	29	8	2	19	57	22	9	26	38.60	1898–99	2020–21	
Barrow	8	7	1	0	8	3	1	4	16	10	2	4	62.50	1966–67	2012–13	
Barry Town	1	1	0	0	1	1	0	0	2	2	0	0	100.00	1913–14	1913–14	
Bath City	2	2	0	0	2	0	2	0	4	2	2	0	50.00	2010–11	2011–12	
Birmingham City ^{†}	28	7	9	12	27	4	8	15	55	11	17	27	20.00	1897–98	2020–21	^{[C]}
Blackburn Rovers ^{†}	20	12	8	0	20	3	5	12	40	15	13	12	37.50	1937–38	2020–21	
Blackpool	22	14	4	4	22	6	5	11	44	20	9	15	45.45	1897–98	2018–19	
Bolton Wanderers	15	6	5	4	15	3	3	9	30	9	8	13	30.00	1899–1900	1994–95	
Bradford City	7	3	2	2	7	2	3	2	14	5	5	4	35.71	1965–66	2018–19	
Bradford Park Avenue	10	6	3	1	10	1	3	6	20	7	6	7	35.00	1907–08	1966–67	
Braintree Town	3	1	0	2	3	1	0	2	6	2	0	4	33.33	2011–12	2013–14	
Brentford ^{†}	48	31	9	8	48	12	10	26	96	43	19	34	44.79	1901–02	2020–21	
Brighton & Hove Albion	39	27	8	4	39	5	10	24	78	32	18	28	41.03	1903–04	2007–08	
Bristol City ^{†}	30	14	9	7	29	6	7	16	59	20	16	23	33.90	1900–01	2020–21	
Bristol Rovers	55	33	12	10	55	10	13	32	110	43	25	42	39.09	1900–01	2018–19	
Burnley	23	10	3	10	23	5	7	11	46	15	10	21	32.61	1897–98	2006–07	
Burton Albion	2	1	0	1	2	0	0	2	4	1	0	3	25.00	2014–15	2018–19	
Burton Swifts ^{‡}	3	2	1	0	3	0	1	2	6	2	2	2	33.33	1897–98	1899–1900	
Bury	19	11	5	3	19	6	3	10	38	17	8	13	44.74	1937–38	2014–15	
Caerphilly ^{‡}	1	1	0	0	1	1	0	0	2	2	0	0	100.00	1913–14	1913–14	
Cambridge United	16	8	7	1	16	6	7	3	32	14	14	4	43.75	1978–79	2017–18	
Cardiff City ^{†}	31	16	11	4	32	6	7	19	63	22	18	23	34.92	1914–15	2020–21	
Carlisle United	15	7	5	3	15	5	6	4	30	12	11	7	40.00	1964–65	2017–18	
Charlton Athletic	33	23	4	6	33	7	8	18	66	30	12	24	45.45	1921–22	2019–20	
Chatham Town	2	2	0	0	2	0	1	1	4	2	1	1	50.00	1894–95	1895–96	
Chelsea	19	8	6	5	19	4	5	10	38	12	11	15	31.58	1955–56	1991–92	
Cheltenham Town	6	3	2	1	6	0	5	1	12	3	7	2	25.00	2001–02	2017–18	
Chester City ^{‡}	4	2	2	0	4	1	3	0	8	3	5	0	37.50	1965–66	2008–09	^{[D]}
Chester	1	1	0	0	1	0	1	0	2	1	1	0	50.00	2013–14	2013–14	
Chesterfield	20	12	5	3	20	5	6	9	40	17	11	12	42.50	1899–1900	2017–18	
Clapton	2	2	0	0	2	1	1	0	4	3	1	0	75.00	1894–95	1895–96	
Colchester United	12	6	3	3	12	2	5	5	24	8	8	8	33.33	1963–64	2017–18	
Coventry City ^{†}	38	18	7	13	39	3	9	27	77	21	16	40	27.27	1908–09	2020–21	
Crawley Town	5	3	0	2	5	0	2	3	10	3	2	5	30.00	2009–10	2017–18	
Crewe Alexandra	11	8	2	1	11	3	1	7	22	11	3	8	50.00	1963–64	2017–18	
Croydon Common ^{‡}	4	3	1	0	4	1	2	1	8	4	3	1	50.00	1909–10	1914–15	
Crystal Palace	33	17	8	8	33	6	8	19	66	23	16	27	34.85	1906–07	2006–07	
Dagenham & Redbridge	3	3	0	0	3	1	1	1	6	4	1	1	66.67	2008–09	2015–16	
Darlington	6	5	0	1	6	1	2	3	12	6	2	4	50.00	1965–66	2011–12	
Dartford	2	1	0	1	2	1	0	1	4	2	0	2	50.00	2012–13	2013–14	
Darwen ^{‡}	2	2	0	0	2	1	1	0	4	3	1	0	75.00	1897–98	1898–99	
Derby County ^{†}	20	13	2	5	19	3	7	9	39	16	9	14	41.03	1953–54	2020–21	
Doncaster Rovers	13	9	2	2	13	3	4	6	26	12	6	8	46.15	1947–48	2018–19	
Eastbourne Borough	2	2	0	0	2	2	0	0	4	4	0	0	100.00	2009–10	2010–11	
Ebbsfleet United	3	2	0	1	3	2	1	0	6	4	1	1	66.67	2009–10	2012–13	
Everton	19	9	5	5	19	5	3	11	38	14	8	16	36.84	1951–52	1991–92	
Exeter City	32	20	6	6	32	13	8	11	64	33	14	17	51.56	1908–09	2017–18	
FC Halifax Town	1	1	0	0	1	0	0	1	2	1	0	1	50.00	2013–14	2013–14	
Fleetwood Town	3	1	0	2	3	3	0	0	6	4	0	2	66.67	2010–11	2018–19	
Forest Green Rovers	6	4	2	0	6	4	1	1	12	8	3	1	66.67	2009–10	2017–18	
Fulham	29	17	3	9	29	5	5	19	58	22	8	28	37.93	1903–04	2019–20	
Gainsborough Trinity	3	3	0	0	3	1	2	0	6	4	2	0	66.67	1897–98	1899–1900	
Gateshead	5	3	2	0	5	1	2	2	10	4	4	2	40.00	2009–10	2013–14	
Gillingham	42	29	8	5	42	12	11	19	84	41	19	24	48.81	1895–96	2018–19	^{[E]}
Glossop North End	1	0	0	1	1	0	0	1	2	0	0	2	0.00	1898–99	1898–99	^{[F]}
Gravesend United ^{‡}	1	1	0	0	1	0	1	0	2	1	1	0	50.00	1900–01	1900–01	
Grays Athletic	1	1	0	0	1	1	0	0	2	2	0	0	100.00	2009–10	2009–10	
Grimsby Town	24	10	8	6	24	7	7	10	48	17	15	16	35.42	1897–98	2017–18	
Halifax Town ^{‡}	5	4	1	0	5	2	2	1	10	6	3	1	60.00	1965–66	2001–02	
Hartlepool United	11	9	1	1	11	4	1	6	22	13	2	7	59.09	1965–66	2016–17	
Hayes & Yeading United	3	2	1	0	3	2	1	0	6	4	2	0	66.67	2009–10	2011–12	
Hereford United ^{‡}	3	2	1	0	3	1	1	1	6	3	2	1	50.00	1976–77	2013–14	
Histon	2	2	0	0	2	2	0	0	4	4	0	0	100.00	2009–10	2010–11	
Huddersfield Town ^{†}	12	5	2	5	12	5	3	4	24	10	5	9	41.67	1952–53	2020–21	
Hull City	20	7	4	9	20	10	4	6	40	17	8	15	42.50	1949–50	2019–20	
Hyde	2	1	0	1	2	2	0	0	4	3	0	1	75.00	2012–13	2013–14	
Ilford ^{‡}	2	1	1	0	2	1	0	1	4	2	1	1	50.00	1894–95	1895–96	
Ipswich Town	10	6	1	3	10	3	2	5	20	9	3	8	45.00	1954–55	2006–07	
Kettering Town	8	6	1	1	8	3	3	2	16	9	4	3	56.25	1896–97	2011–12	^{[G]}
Kidderminster Harriers	6	4	1	1	6	5	1	0	12	9	2	1	75.00	2001–02	2013–14	
Leeds United	22	8	10	4	22	4	6	12	44	12	16	16	27.27	1947–48	2019–20	
Leicester City	28	13	6	9	28	4	13	11	56	17	19	20	30.36	1897–98	2006–07	^{[H]}
Leyton ^{‡}	6	4	1	1	6	0	1	5	12	4	2	6	33.33	1906–07	1911–12	
Leyton Orient	27	17	4	6	27	7	10	10	54	24	14	16	44.44	1929–30	2016–17	^{[I]}
Lincoln City	18	14	2	2	18	5	9	4	36	19	11	6	52.78	1897–98	2017–18	
Liverpool	14	6	3	5	14	0	6	8	28	6	9	13	21.43	1954–55	1991–92	
Llanelli	2	2	0	0	2	0	1	1	4	2	1	1	50.00	1912–13	1913–14	
Loughborough ^{‡}	4	3	1	0	4	1	1	2	8	4	2	2	50.00	1896–97	1899–1900	
Macclesfield Town	5	2	2	1	5	1	2	2	10	3	4	3	30.00	1998–99	2013–14	
Manchester City	17	8	6	3	17	3	5	9	34	11	11	12	32.35	1897–98	1991–92	
Manchester United	19	3	7	9	19	1	0	18	38	4	7	27	10.53	1897–98	1991–92	^{[J]}
Mansfield Town	16	8	5	3	16	1	8	7	32	9	13	10	28.13	1931–32	2017–18	
Mardy	2	2	0	0	2	2	0	0	4	4	0	0	100.00	1912–13	1913–14	
Merthyr Town ^{‡}	11	9	1	1	11	3	3	5	22	12	4	6	54.55	1919–20	1929–30	
Mid Rhondda ^{‡}	2	1	1	0	2	1	1	0	4	2	2	0	50.00	1912–13	1913–14	
Middlesbrough ^{†}	14	8	3	3	15	5	4	6	29	13	7	9	44.83	1899–1900	2020–21	
Millwall ^{†}	53	18	18	17	54	11	16	27	107	29	34	44	27.10	1894–95	2020–21	^{[K]}
Milton Keynes Dons	1	1	0	0	1	1	0	0	2	2	0	0	100.00	2004–05	2004–05	
Morecambe	5	3	1	1	5	3	1	1	10	6	2	2	60.00	2008–09	2017–18	
New Brighton Tower ^{‡}	2	0	0	2	2	0	0	2	4	0	0	4	0.00	1898–99	1899–1900	
Newcastle United	23	14	5	4	23	1	5	17	46	15	10	21	32.61	1898–99	1992–93	
Newport County	30	21	9	0	30	7	8	15	60	28	17	15	46.67	1912–13	2017–18	
Northampton Town	38	25	7	6	38	9	7	22	76	34	14	28	44.74	1901–02	2015–16	
Norwich City ^{†}	44	21	13	10	43	7	12	24	87	28	25	34	32.18	1905–06	2020–21	
Nottingham Forest ^{†}	30	14	9	7	29	6	6	17	59	20	15	24	33.90	1937–38	2020–21	
Notts County	35	21	9	5	35	13	13	9	70	34	22	14	48.57	1930–31	2017–18	
Nuneaton Town	2	2	0	0	2	1	1	0	4	3	1	0	75.00	2012–13	2013–14	
Oldham Athletic	22	10	8	4	22	6	7	9	44	16	15	13	36.36	1953–54	2007–08	
Oxford United	17	9	3	5	17	7	5	5	34	16	8	10	47.06	1970–71	2018–19	
Peterborough United	10	5	3	2	10	3	5	2	20	8	8	4	40.00	1963–64	2018–19	
Plymouth Argyle	48	17	19	12	48	9	11	28	96	26	30	40	27.08	1903–04	2018–19	
Pontypridd ^{‡}	2	1	1	0	2	1	0	1	4	2	1	1	50.00	1912–13	1913–14	
Port Vale	17	10	5	2	17	5	2	10	34	15	7	12	44.12	1898–99	2017–18	^{[L]}
Portsmouth	37	23	6	8	37	4	8	25	74	27	14	33	36.49	1900–01	2018–19	
Preston North End ^{†}	23	10	6	7	22	2	4	16	45	12	10	23	26.67	1949–50	2020–21	
Queens Park Rangers ^{†}	59	29	19	11	58	10	13	35	117	39	32	46	33.33	1900–01	2020–21	
Reading ^{†}	38	22	6	10	39	10	9	20	77	32	15	30	41.56	1894–95	2020–21	
Rochdale	7	5	1	1	7	2	2	3	14	7	3	4	50.00	1965–66	2018–19	
Rotherham United ^{†}	13	8	2	3	14	4	5	5	27	12	7	8	44.44	1951–52	2020–21	
Royal Ordnance Factories ^{‡}	2	2	0	0	2	0	1	1	4	2	1	1	50.00	1894–95	1895–96	
Rushden ^{‡}	1	1	0	0	1	1	0	0	2	2	0	0	100.00	1896–97	1896–97	
Rushden & Diamonds ^{‡}	4	3	0	1	4	2	2	0	8	5	2	1	62.50	2001–02	2010–11	
Salisbury City ^{‡}	2	2	0	0	2	0	2	0	4	2	2	0	50.00	2009–10	2013–14	
Scunthorpe United	7	3	2	2	7	3	0	4	14	6	2	6	42.86	1960–61	2018–19	
Sheffield United	18	9	3	6	18	3	6	9	36	12	9	15	33.33	1937–38	2005–06	
Sheffield Wednesday ^{†}	29	13	10	6	30	5	10	15	59	18	20	21	30.51	1899–1900	2020–21	
Shrewsbury Town	12	7	4	1	12	6	1	5	24	13	5	6	54.17	1963–64	2018–19	
Southampton	45	19	10	16	45	9	9	27	90	28	19	43	31.11	1894–95	2006–07	^{[M]}
Southend United	37	21	11	5	37	12	6	19	74	33	17	24	44.59	1908–09	2018–19	
Southport	8	6	2	0	8	2	2	4	16	8	4	4	50.00	1965–66	2013–14	
Stevenage	5	2	0	3	5	2	2	1	10	4	2	4	40.00	2009–10	2017–18	^{[N]}
Stockport County	11	7	3	1	11	4	3	4	22	11	6	5	50.00	1937–38	2012–13	
Stoke City ^{†}	23	6	8	9	22	5	7	10	45	11	15	19	24.44	1911–12	2020–21	^{[O]}
Sunderland	24	10	3	11	24	3	8	13	48	13	11	24	27.08	1955–56	2018–19	
Swansea City ^{†}	28	17	5	6	29	6	7	16	57	23	12	22	40.35	1912–13	2020–21	^{[P]}
Swindon Town	46	30	9	7	46	10	12	24	92	40	21	31	43.48	1894–95	2017–18	
Tamworth	5	4	1	0	5	3	1	1	10	7	2	1	70.00	2009–10	2013–14	
Thames ^{‡}	2	2	0	0	2	1	0	1	4	3	0	1	75.00	1930–31	1931–32	
Ton Pentre ^{‡}	2	2	0	0	2	1	0	1	4	3	0	1	75.00	1912–13	1913–14	
Torquay United	15	13	1	1	15	5	6	4	30	18	7	5	60.00	1927–28	2004–05	
Tottenham Hotspur	32	11	13	8	32	6	8	18	64	17	21	26	26.56	1896–97	1991–92	
Tranmere Rovers	14	10	3	1	14	5	1	8	28	15	4	9	53.57	1938–39	2014–15	
Treharris Athletic Western	2	2	0	0	2	2	0	0	4	4	0	0	100.00	1912–13	1913–14	^{[Q]}
Walsall	21	14	2	5	21	5	4	12	42	19	6	17	45.24	1897–98	2018–19	
Watford ^{†}	51	30	11	10	52	15	13	24	103	45	24	34	43.69	1900–01	2020–21	
Welling United	1	1	0	0	1	1	0	0	2	2	0	0	100.00	2013–14	2013–14	
Wellingborough Town ^{‡}	5	4	0	1	5	0	2	3	10	4	2	4	40.00	1896–97	1904–05	
West Bromwich Albion	20	7	6	7	20	3	2	15	40	10	8	22	25.00	1938–39	2019–20	
West Ham United	39	16	13	10	39	9	9	21	78	25	22	31	32.05	1900–01	1992–93	
Wigan Athletic	6	1	2	3	6	1	3	2	12	2	5	5	16.67	1997–98	2019–20	
Wimbledon ^{‡}	6	2	3	1	6	2	0	4	12	4	3	5	33.33	1986–87	1991–92	
Woking	2	1	0	1	2	1	0	1	4	2	0	2	50.00	2012–13	2013–14	
Wolverhampton Wanderers	14	6	3	5	14	5	2	7	28	11	5	12	39.29	1955–56	2006–07	
Workington	2	1	1	0	2	1	0	1	4	2	1	1	50.00	1964–65	1967–68	
Wrexham	20	11	5	4	20	2	4	14	40	13	9	18	32.50	1963–64	2013–14	
Wycombe Wanderers ^{†}	14	6	3	5	13	6	7	0	27	12	10	5	44.44	1996–97	2020–21	
Yeovil Town	4	2	2	0	4	2	1	1	8	4	3	1	50.00	2007–08	2017–18	
York City	12	8	3	1	12	4	5	3	24	12	8	4	50.00	1966–67	2015–16	

a Results in the Southern Football League, the United League and the Football League until 1997 sourced to Bailey, The Definitive Luton Town F.C. This list excludes games played in the abandoned 1939–40 season. Results in the Football League post-1997 and the Football Conference sourced to Soccerbase.

== Footnotes ==
A. Record against Bournemouth & Boscombe Athletic included
B. Record against Woolwich Arsenal included
C. Record against Small Heath included; record against Birmingham included
D. Record against Chester (1885) included
E. Record against New Brompton included
F. Record against Glossop included
G. Record against Kettering included
H. Record against Leicester Fosse included
I. Record against Clapton Orient included; record against Orient included
J. Record against Newton Heath included
K. ^{a} ^{b} Record against Millwall Athletic included
L. Record against Burslem Port Vale included
M. Record against Southampton St. Mary's included
N. Record against Stevenage Borough included
O. Record against Stoke included
P. Record against Swansea Town included
Q. Record against Treharris included
