= Gareth Evans (footballer, born 1988) =

English footballer

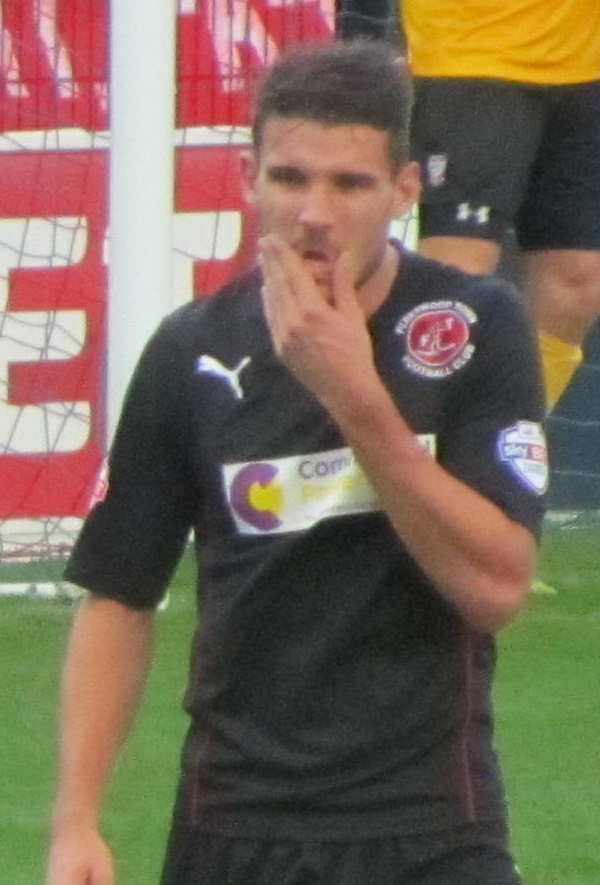
- Evans playing for Fleetwood Town in 2013

Personal information
- Full name: Gareth Charles Evans
- Date of birth: 26 April 1988 (age 38)
- Place of birth: Macclesfield, England
- Height: 6 ft 0 in (1.83 m)
- Position: Midfielder

Team information
- Current team: Radcliffe

Youth career
- 1994–1995: Crewe Alexandra
- 1995–2002: Manchester United
- 2002–2006: Crewe Alexandra

Senior career*
Years	Team	Apps	(Gls)
2006–2007	Crewe Alexandra	0	(0)
2006	→ Leigh RMI (loan)		
2007	→ Alsager Town (loan)		
2007–2009	Macclesfield Town	82	(19)
2009–2011	Bradford City	79	(14)
2011–2013	Rotherham United	45	(9)
2013–2015	Fleetwood Town	93	(10)
2015–2020	Portsmouth	173	(32)
2020–2022	Bradford City	47	(3)
2022–	Radcliffe	15	(1)
- * Club domestic league appearances and goals as of 12:03, 3 January 2023 (UTC)

Gareth Charles Evans (born 26 April 1988) is an English professional footballer who plays as a winger for Radcliffe. He can also play as a midfielder and at right back.

Evans began his career as a youth player with both Manchester United and Crewe Alexandra. He went professional in 2006, but struggled to break into the Crewe first team and went on loans to Leigh RMI in 2006, and Alsager Town in 2007, then moved to his hometown club, Macclesfield Town in that same year. He signed for Bradford City in 2009, before he left them to sign for Yorkshire rivals Rotherham United in June 2011. Evans joined Fleetwood Town on the opening day of the 2013 January transfer window following his departure from Rotherham. Evans signed for Portsmouth FC on 28 July 2015.

== Career ==
=== Crewe Alexandra ===
Born in Macclesfield, Evans started his career with Manchester United as part of the youth setup.

Despite being touted as a future star by Alex Ferguson he decided to re-join Crewe Alexandra under Dario Gradi due to their excellent record for mentoring youth players. He had previously been with Crewe from the age of seven before joining Manchester United where he stayed until 14 years of age.

Due to the relegation of Crewe in 2005–06 season and the judgement of the new Manager, Steve Holland, Evans was released by the club.

=== Macclesfield Town ===
After leaving Crewe, Evans played in the PFA exit trials and joined Port Vale under Martin Foyle. He scored and impressed in pre-season for them and went on the pre-season tour, but as Foyle had already signed several players that summer, no budget was available for younger inexperienced players. As a result, however, he was recommended to Ian Brightwell at Macclesfield Town so that he could gain experience of league football. Evans signed for the League Two side during the 2007–08 season. He was given the number 26 jersey. Still just 20, he became a first team regular scoring twelve goals and with a number of assists including a goal at West Ham in the League Cup. His energy and work rate made him a big hit with the Macclesfield fans.

=== Bradford City ===
On 1 July 2009, Bradford signed Evans from Macclesfield for an undisclosed fee believed to be £30,000. He made his debut on the opening day of the season, coming on as a second-half substitute against eventual league winners Notts County. He scored his first Bradford goal in a 5–4 away win to Cheltenham. In November during a 1–1 home draw against Accrington, Evans missed a last minute penalty, that hit a fan in the lower tier of the stand behind the goal, knocking them to the ground. He finished his first season with the Bantams with 11 goals, including two braces in wins against Torquay and Northampton. The first goal in the match against Northampton was nominated for Mitre Goal of the Year and finished in the top 10. His finished his second season with three goals, coming in wins against Stevenage, Stockport and Lincoln. He was released by Bradford at the end of the season, and signed for Yorkshire neighbours and League Two rivals Rotherham United on 3 June 2011.

=== Rotherham United ===
He scored two goals on his debut for the Millers against Plymouth, as Rotherham won 4–1. He scored again in two home wins against Gillingham and Dagenham, and then in successive away draws against Morecambe and Northampton. He returned to face former club Bradford for the first time in November, however he was injured after just 12 minutes and had to be substituted. On 28 April 2012, he scored a penalty in a 2–2 draw against Aldershot Town. His first two goals of the following season came against former club Bradford on 1 September 2012.

=== Fleetwood Town ===
On 1 January 2013, Evans moved to League Two side Fleetwood Town on a free transfer. He scored his first goal for the club on 23 March, in a 2–1 win against Dagenham & Redbridge.

=== Portsmouth ===
On 28 July 2015, Evans completed a move to League Two side Portsmouth on a one-year deal. In his first season, Evans was a regular choice as the right-winger in Paul Cook's preferred 4-2-3-1 formation; playing as a more traditional wide-player than Kyle Bennett on the opposite flank, hugging the touchline, getting crosses into the box and seeking to provide a goalscoring threat. Evans managed to scored 10 League goals as he racked up 48 appearances in all competitions.

Despite a summer overhaul by the manager, during which Carl Baker was brought in to challenge for Evans' spot, and the resurgence of Kal Naismith, Evans remained a key member of the Portsmouth squad in the 2016/17 promotion campaign. Though the midfielder missed pre-season with an injury sustained in the previous campaign's playoff semi-final, upon his return Evans quickly established himself in the first-team in a new position: at right-back. Evans successfully kept natural right-back and summer signing Drew Talbot on the bench throughout the season, as Portsmouth claimed promotion via the League Two Championship, making more than 40 appearances across all competitions and establishing himself as the team's first-choice penalty taker.

On 18 May 2017 Evans signed a new 2-year contract at Portsmouth, keeping him at the club until 2019. During the 2018–2019 season, Evans primarily has started as a midfielder under manager Kenny Jackett, playing behind wingers Jamal Lowe and Ronan Curtis. In the 2017-18 league one season, Evans played vice-captain role to Brett Pitman. In the 2018–19 season, with the inconsistent form of Pitman, Evans has become the squads' first-choice captain.

On 25 September 2020, Evans left Portsmouth by mutual consent, after spending 5 seasons at the club, appearing 173 times, (more than any other Portsmouth player since Linvoy Primus in 2009), and netting 32 goals.

=== Return to Bradford City ===
Not long after leaving Portsmouth, on 25 September 2020, Evans returned to Bradford City on a free transfer after he left Portsmouth by mutual consent, signing a two-year contract. Evans departed the club upon the expiration of this contract, at the end of the 2021–22 season.

=== Radcliffe ===
On 10 September 2022, Evans signed for Northern Premier League Premier Division club Radcliffe.

== Career statistics ==
As of end of 2021–22 season

Appearances and goals by club, season and competition
Club	Season	League			FA Cup		League Cup		Other		Total	
Club	Season	Division	Apps	Goals	Apps	Goals	Apps	Goals	Apps	Goals	Apps	Goals
Macclesfield Town	2007–08	League Two	42	7	1	0	1	0	1	0	45	7
Macclesfield Town	2008–09	League Two	40	12	2	0	2	1	0	0	44	13
Macclesfield Town	Total		82	19	3	0	3	1	1	0	89	20
Bradford City	2009–10	League Two	43	11	1	0	1	0	2	0	47	11
Bradford City	2010–11	League Two	36	3	1	0	1	0	0	0	38	3
Bradford City	Total		79	14	2	0	2	0	2	0	85	14
Rotherham United	2011–12	League Two	32	7	1	0	1	0	0	0	34	7
Rotherham United	2012–13	League Two	13	2	0	0	1	0	1	0	15	2
Rotherham United	Total		45	9	1	0	2	0	1	0	49	9
Fleetwood Town	2012–13	League Two	16	1	0	0	0	0	0	0	16	1
Fleetwood Town	2013–14	League Two	34	6	3	0	2	1	6	0	45	7
Fleetwood Town	2014–15	League One	43	3	1	0	1	0	1	1	46	4
Fleetwood Town	Total		93	10	4	0	3	1	7	1	107	12
Portsmouth	2015–16	League Two	40	10	4	0	2	0	2	0	48	10
Portsmouth	2016–17	League Two	41	5	1	1	1	0	3	0	46	6
Portsmouth	2017–18	League One	32	2	0	0	1	0	4	1	37	3
Portsmouth	2018–19	League One	42	10	5	0	1	0	8	3	56	13
Portsmouth	2019–20	League One	17	5	3	0	2	0	6	0	28	5
Portsmouth	2020–21	League One	1	0	0	0	1	1	1	0	3	1
Portsmouth	Total		173	32	13	1	8	1	24	4	218	38
Bradford City	2020–21	League Two	27	2	1	0	0	0	0	0	28	2
Bradford City	2021–22	League Two	20	1	1	0	0	0	3	0	24	1
Bradford City	Total		47	3	2	0	0	0	3	0	52	3
Career total			519	87	25	1	18	3	38	5	600	96

== Honours ==
Rotherham United

- Football League Two second-place promotion: 2012–13

Fleetwood Town

- Football League Two play-offs: 2014

Portsmouth

- EFL League Two: 2016–17
- EFL Trophy: 2018–19
