= 2018–19 English Football League =

120th season of the English Football League

English Football League
- Season: 2018–19
- Champions: Norwich City
- Promoted: Sheffield United; Aston Villa
- Relegated: Notts County; Yeovil Town
- New clubs in league: Macclesfield Town; Tranmere Rovers

The 2018–19 season was the 120th season of the English Football League (EFL) and the third season under that name after it was renamed from The Football League in 2016. It began on 3 August 2018 and concluded on 5 May 2019, with the promotion play-off finals at Wembley Stadium on 25–27 May 2019. For the sixth season running, the league was sponsored by Sky Betting & Gaming and was therefore known as the Sky Bet EFL.

The EFL is contested through three divisions: the Championship, League One and League Two. The winner and the runner-up of the Championship are automatically promoted to the Premier League and they are joined by the winner of the Championship play-off. The bottom two teams in League Two are relegated to the National League.

The 2018–19 season marked the start of an initial two-year partnership between the EFL and its official charity partner Mind. The mental health charity had its logo displayed on the shirts of all EFL clubs and worked with the EFL to promote mental health within football and the wider community. Also, this season saw one of the EFL's original members, Notts County, relegated from the league for the first time ever.

== Promotion and relegation ==
=== From the Premier League ===
Relegated to the Championship

- West Bromwich Albion
- Stoke City
- Swansea City

=== From the Championship ===
Promoted to the Premier League

- Wolverhampton Wanderers
- Cardiff City
- Fulham

Relegated to League One

- Barnsley
- Burton Albion
- Sunderland

=== From League One ===
Promoted to the Championship

- Wigan Athletic
- Blackburn Rovers
- Rotherham United

Relegated to League Two

- Oldham Athletic
- Northampton Town
- MK Dons
- Bury

=== From League Two ===
Promoted to League One

- Accrington Stanley
- Luton Town
- Wycombe Wanderers
- Coventry City

Relegated to the National League

- Barnet
- Chesterfield

=== From the National League ===
Promoted to League Two

- Macclesfield Town
- Tranmere Rovers

== Championship ==
=== Table ===
Pos	Team	Pld	W	D	L	GF	GA	GD	Pts	Promotion, qualification or relegation
1	Norwich City (C, P)	46	27	13	6	93	57	+36	94	Promotion to the Premier League
2	Sheffield United (P)	46	26	11	9	78	41	+37	89	Promotion to the Premier League
3	Leeds United	46	25	8	13	73	50	+23	83	Qualification for Championship play-offs (Note: Four teams play for one spot and promotion to the Premier League.)
4	West Bromwich Albion	46	23	11	12	87	62	+25	80	Qualification for Championship play-offs
5	Aston Villa (O, P)	46	20	16	10	82	61	+21	76	Qualification for Championship play-offs
6	Derby County	46	20	14	12	69	54	+15	74	Qualification for Championship play-offs
7	Middlesbrough	46	20	13	13	49	41	+8	73	
8	Bristol City	46	19	13	14	59	53	+6	70	
9	Nottingham Forest	46	17	15	14	61	54	+7	66	
10	Swansea City	46	18	11	17	65	62	+3	65	
11	Brentford	46	17	13	16	73	59	+14	64 (Note: Brentford were awarded a 1–0 win over Bolton due to Bolton's inability to hold the fixture.)	
12	Sheffield Wednesday	46	16	16	14	60	62	−2	64	
13	Hull City	46	17	11	18	66	68	−2	62	
14	Preston North End	46	16	13	17	67	67	0	61	
15	Blackburn Rovers	46	16	12	18	64	69	−5	60	
16	Stoke City	46	11	22	13	45	52	−7	55	
17	Birmingham City	46	14	19	13	64	58	+6	52 (Note: Birmingham City were deducted 9 points for failure to comply with the EFL profitability and sustainability rules.)	
18	Wigan Athletic	46	13	13	20	51	64	−13	52	
19	Queens Park Rangers	46	14	9	23	53	71	−18	51	
20	Reading	46	10	17	19	49	66	−17	47	
21	Millwall	46	10	14	22	48	64	−16	44	
22	Rotherham United (R)	46	8	16	22	52	83	−31	40	Relegation to EFL League One
23	Bolton Wanderers (R)	46	8	8	30	29	78	−49	32	Relegation to EFL League One
24	Ipswich Town (R)	46	5	16	25	36	77	−41	31	Relegation to EFL League One

Source: Sky Sports Archived 25 September 2019 at the Wayback Machine
Rules for classification: 1) Points; 2) Goal difference; 3) Number of goals scored; 4) Head-to-head results
(C) Champions; (O) Play-off winners; (P) Promoted; (R) Relegated

=== Play-offs ===
Semi-finals
3	Leeds United	1	2	3
6	Derby County	0	4	4
4	West Bromwich Albion	1	1	2 (3)
5	Aston Villa	2	0	2 (4)

Final
6	Derby County	1
5	Aston Villa	2

=== Results ===
Home \ Away	AST	BIR	BLB	BOL	BRE	BRI	DER	HUL	IPS	LEE	MID	MIL	NOR	NOT	PNE	QPR	REA	ROT	SHU	SHW	STO	SWA	WBA	WIG
Aston Villa	—	4–2	2–1	2–0	2–2	2–1	4–0	2–2	2–1	2–3	3–0	1–0	1–2	5–5	3–3	2–2	1–1	2–0	3–3	1–2	2–2	1–0	0–2	3–2
Birmingham City	0–1	—	2–2	0–1	0–0	0–1	2–2	3–3	2–2	1–0	1–2	0–2	2–2	2–0	3–0	0–0	2–1	3–1	1–1	3–1	2–0	0–0	1–1	1–1
Blackburn Rovers	1–1	2–2	—	2–0	1–0	0–1	2–0	3–0	2–0	2–1	0–1	0–0	0–1	2–2	0–1	1–0	2–2	1–1	0–2	4–2	0–1	2–2	2–1	3–0
Bolton Wanderers	0–2	1–0	0–1	—	0–1	2–2	1–0	0–1	1–2	0–1	0–2	2–1	0–4	0–3	1–2	1–2	1–1	2–1	0–3	0–2	0–0	0–1	0–2	1–1
Brentford	1–0	1–1	5–2	1–0	—	0–1	3–3	5–1	2–0	2–0	1–2	2–0	1–1	2–1	3–0	3–0	2–2	5–1	2–3	2–0	3–1	2–3	0–1	2–0
Bristol City	1–1	1–2	4–1	2–1	1–1	—	0–2	1–0	1–1	0–1	0–2	1–1	2–2	1–1	0–1	2–1	1–1	1–0	1–0	1–2	0–1	2–0	3–2	2–2
Derby County	0–3	3–1	0–0	4–0	3–1	1–1	—	2–0	2–0	1–4	1–1	0–1	1–1	0–0	2–0	2–0	2–1	6–1	2–1	1–1	0–0	2–1	3–1	2–1
Hull City	1–3	2–0	0–1	6–0	2–0	1–1	1–2	—	2–0	0–1	1–1	2–1	0–0	0–2	1–1	2–2	3–1	2–2	0–3	3–0	2–0	3–2	1–0	2–1
Ipswich Town	1–1	1–1	2–2	0–0	1–1	2–3	1–1	0–2	—	3–2	0–2	2–3	1–1	1–1	1–1	0–2	1–2	1–0	1–1	0–1	1–1	0–1	1–2	1–0
Leeds United	1–1	1–2	3–2	2–1	1–1	2–0	2–0	0–2	2–0	—	0–0	3–2	1–3	1–1	3–0	2–1	1–0	2–0	0–1	1–0	3–1	2–1	4–0	1–2
Middlesbrough	0–3	1–0	1–1	2–0	1–2	0–1	1–1	1–0	2–0	1–1	—	1–1	0–1	0–2	1–2	2–0	2–1	0–0	3–0	0–1	1–0	0–0	1–0	2–0
Millwall	2–1	0–2	0–2	1–1	1–1	1–2	2–1	2–2	3–0	1–1	2–2	—	1–3	1–0	1–3	0–0	1–0	0–0	2–3	0–0	0–0	1–2	2–0	2–1
Norwich City	2–1	3–1	2–1	3–2	1–0	3–2	3–4	3–2	3–0	0–3	1–0	4–3	—	3–3	2–0	4–0	2–2	3–1	2–2	2–2	0–1	1–0	3–4	1–0
Nottingham Forest	1–3	2–2	1–2	1–0	2–1	0–1	1–0	3–0	2–0	4–2	3–0	2–2	1–2	—	0–1	0–1	1–0	1–0	1–0	2–1	0–0	2–1	1–1	3–1
Preston North End	1–1	1–0	4–1	2–2	4–3	1–1	0–0	1–2	4–0	0–2	1–1	3–2	3–1	0–0	—	1–0	2–3	1–1	0–1	3–3	2–2	1–1	2–3	4–0
Queens Park Rangers	1–0	3–4	1–2	1–2	3–2	0–3	1–1	2–3	3–0	1–0	2–1	2–0	0–1	0–1	1–4	—	0–0	1–2	1–2	3–0	0–0	4–0	2–3	1–0
Reading	0–0	0–0	2–1	0–1	2–1	3–2	1–2	3–0	2–2	0–3	0–1	3–1	1–2	2–0	2–1	0–1	—	1–1	0–2	1–2	2–2	1–4	0–0	3–2
Rotherham United	1–2	1–3	3–2	1–1	2–4	0–0	1–0	2–3	1–0	1–2	1–2	1–0	1–2	2–1	2–1	2–2	1–1	—	2–2	2–2	2–2	2–1	0–4	1–1
Sheffield United	4–1	0–0	3–0	2–0	2–0	2–3	3–1	1–0	2–0	0–1	1–0	1–1	2–1	2–0	3–2	1–0	4–0	2–0	—	0–0	1–1	1–2	1–2	4–2
Sheffield Wednesday	1–3	1–1	4–2	1–0	2–0	2–0	1–2	1–1	2–1	1–1	1–2	2–1	0–4	3–0	1–0	1–2	0–0	2–2	0–0	—	2–2	3–1	2–2	1–0
Stoke City	1–1	0–1	2–3	2–0	1–1	0–2	2–1	2–0	2–0	2–1	0–0	1–0	2–2	2–0	0–2	2–2	0–0	2–2	2–2	0–0	—	1–0	0–1	0–3
Swansea City	0–1	3–3	3–1	2–0	3–0	0–1	1–1	2–2	2–3	2–2	3–1	1–0	1–4	0–0	1–0	3–0	2–0	4–3	1–0	2–1	3–1	—	1–2	2–2
West Bromwich Albion	2–2	3–2	1–1	1–2	1–1	4–2	1–4	3–2	1–1	4–1	2–3	2–0	1–1	2–2	4–1	7–1	4–1	2–1	0–1	1–1	2–1	3–0	—	2–0
Wigan Athletic	3–0	0–3	3–1	5–2	0–0	1–0	0–1	2–1	1–1	1–2	0–0	1–0	1–1	2–2	2–0	2–1	0–0	1–0	0–3	3–2	0–0	0–0	1–0	—

Source: EFL Official Website
Legend: Blue = home team win; Yellow = draw; Red = away team win.
For upcoming matches, an "a" indicates there is an article about the rivalry between the two participants.

== League One ==
=== Table ===
Pos	Team	Pld	W	D	L	GF	GA	GD	Pts	Promotion, qualification or relegation
1	Luton Town (C, P)	46	27	13	6	90	42	+48	94	Promotion to the EFL Championship
2	Barnsley (P)	46	26	13	7	80	39	+41	91	Promotion to the EFL Championship
3	Charlton Athletic (O, P)	46	26	10	10	73	40	+33	88	Qualification for League One play-offs (Note: Four teams play for one spot and promotion to the EFL Championship.)
4	Portsmouth	46	25	13	8	83	51	+32	88	Qualification for League One play-offs
5	Sunderland	46	22	19	5	80	47	+33	85	Qualification for League One play-offs
6	Doncaster Rovers	46	20	13	13	76	58	+18	73	Qualification for League One play-offs
7	Peterborough United	46	20	12	14	71	62	+9	72	
8	Coventry City	46	18	11	17	54	54	0	65	
9	Burton Albion	46	17	12	17	66	57	+9	63	
10	Blackpool	46	15	17	14	50	52	−2	62	
11	Fleetwood Town	46	16	13	17	58	52	+6	61	
12	Oxford United	46	15	15	16	58	64	−6	60	
13	Gillingham	46	15	10	21	61	72	−11	55	
14	Accrington Stanley	46	14	13	19	51	67	−16	55	
15	Bristol Rovers	46	13	15	18	47	50	−3	54	
16	Rochdale	46	15	9	22	54	87	−33	54	
17	Wycombe Wanderers	46	14	11	21	55	67	−12	53	
18	Shrewsbury Town	46	12	16	18	51	59	−8	52	
19	Southend United	46	14	8	24	55	68	−13	50	
20	AFC Wimbledon	46	13	11	22	42	63	−21	50	
21	Plymouth Argyle (R)	46	13	11	22	56	80	−24	50	Relegation to EFL League Two
22	Walsall (R)	46	12	11	23	49	71	−22	47	Relegation to EFL League Two
23	Scunthorpe United (R)	46	12	10	24	53	83	−30	46	Relegation to EFL League Two
24	Bradford City (R)	46	11	8	27	49	77	−28	41	Relegation to EFL League Two

Source: EFL Official Website
Rules for classification: 1) Points; 2) Goal difference; 3) Number of goals scored; 4) Head-to-head results
(C) Champions; (O) Play-off winners; (P) Promoted; (R) Relegated

=== Play-offs ===
Semi-finals
3	Charlton Athletic (p)	2	2	4 (4)
6	Doncaster Rovers	1	3	4 (3)
4	Portsmouth	0	0	0
5	Sunderland	1	0	1

Final
3	Charlton Athletic	2
5	Sunderland	1

=== Results ===
Home \ Away	ACC	WIM	BAR	BLP	BRA	BRR	BRT	CHA	COV	DON	FLE	GIL	LUT	OXF	PET	PLY	POR	ROC	SCU	SHR	STD	SUN	WAL	WYC
Accrington Stanley	—	2–1	0–2	1–2	3–1	0–0	1–1	1–1	0–1	1–0	0–1	0–2	0–3	4–2	0–4	5–1	1–1	0–1	1–1	2–1	1–1	0–3	2–1	1–2
AFC Wimbledon	1–1	—	1–4	0–0	0–1	1–1	0–2	1–2	0–0	2–0	0–3	2–4	0–2	2–1	1–0	2–1	1–2	1–1	2–3	1–2	2–1	1–2	1–3	2–1
Barnsley	2–0	0–0	—	2–1	3–0	1–0	0–0	2–1	2–2	1–1	4–2	2–1	3–2	4–0	2–0	1–1	1–1	2–1	2–0	2–1	1–0	0–0	1–1	2–1
Blackpool	1–1	2–0	0–1	—	3–2	0–3	3–0	2–1	2–0	1–1	2–1	0–3	0–0	0–1	0–1	2–2	1–2	2–2	1–0	0–0	2–2	0–1	2–0	2–2
Bradford City	3–0	0–0	0–2	1–4	—	0–0	1–0	0–2	2–4	0–1	0–1	1–1	0–1	2–0	3–1	0–0	0–1	0–2	2–0	4–3	0–4	1–2	4–0	1–2
Bristol Rovers	1–2	2–0	2–1	4–0	3–2	—	0–0	0–0	3–1	0–4	2–1	1–2	1–2	0–0	2–2	0–0	1–2	0–1	1–2	1–1	0–1	0–2	0–1	0–1
Burton Albion	5–2	3–0	3–1	3–0	1–1	1–0	—	1–2	1–0	1–0	0–1	2–3	2–1	0–0	1–2	1–1	1–2	1–2	0–0	2–1	1–2	2–1	0–0	3–1
Charlton Athletic	1–0	2–0	2–0	0–0	1–0	3–1	2–1	—	1–2	2–0	0–0	2–0	3–1	1–1	0–1	2–1	2–1	4–0	4–0	2–1	1–1	1–1	2–1	3–2
Coventry City	1–1	1–1	1–0	0–2	2–0	0–0	1–2	2–1	—	2–1	2–1	1–1	1–2	0–1	1–1	1–0	0–1	0–1	1–2	1–1	1–0	1–1	3–0	1–0
Doncaster Rovers	1–2	2–1	0–0	2–0	2–1	4–1	2–2	1–1	2–0	—	0–4	3–3	2–1	2–2	3–1	2–0	0–0	5–0	3–0	0–0	3–0	0–1	3–1	3–0
Fleetwood Town	1–1	0–1	1–3	3–2	2–1	0–0	1–0	1–0	3–0	3–0	—	1–1	1–2	2–2	1–1	2–0	2–5	2–2	0–1	2–1	2–2	2–1	0–0	1–1
Gillingham	0–0	0–1	1–4	0–1	4–0	0–1	3–1	0–2	1–1	1–3	3–0	—	1–3	1–0	2–4	3–1	2–0	1–1	1–0	0–2	0–2	1–4	0–3	2–2
Luton Town	4–1	2–2	0–0	2–2	4–0	1–0	2–0	2–2	1–1	4–0	2–0	2–2	—	3–1	4–0	5–1	3–2	2–0	3–2	3–2	2–0	1–1	2–0	3–0
Oxford United	2–3	0–0	2–2	2–0	1–0	0–2	3–1	2–1	1–2	2–2	0–2	1–0	1–2	—	0–1	2–0	2–1	4–2	2–1	3–0	0–1	1–1	1–2	2–1
Peterborough United	0–1	1–0	0–4	2–2	1–1	2–1	3–1	0–0	1–2	1–1	1–0	2–0	3–1	2–2	—	0–1	1–2	2–1	0–2	1–2	2–0	1–1	1–1	4–2
Plymouth Argyle	0–3	1–0	0–3	0–1	3–3	2–2	2–3	0–2	2–1	2–3	2–1	3–1	0–0	3–0	1–5	—	1–1	5–1	3–2	2–1	1–1	0–2	2–1	1–1
Portsmouth	1–1	2–1	0–0	0–1	5–1	1–1	2–2	1–2	2–1	1–1	1–0	0–2	1–0	4–1	2–3	3–0	—	4–1	2–0	1–1	2–0	3–1	2–0	2–2
Rochdale	1–0	3–4	0–4	2–1	0–4	0–0	0–4	1–0	0–1	2–3	1–1	3–0	0–0	0–0	1–4	1–2	1–3	—	3–1	2–1	1–0	1–2	1–2	1–0
Scunthorpe United	2–0	1–2	2–2	0–0	2–3	0–1	0–3	5–3	2–1	1–1	0–5	0–2	0–2	3–3	0–2	1–4	1–2	3–3	—	1–0	4–1	1–1	1–1	1–0
Shrewsbury Town	1–0	0–0	3–1	0–0	0–1	1–1	1–1	0–3	1–0	2–0	0–0	2–2	0–3	2–3	2–2	2–0	0–2	3–2	1–1	—	2–0	0–2	0–0	2–1
Southend United	3–0	0–1	0–3	1–2	2–0	1–2	3–2	1–2	1–2	2–3	1–0	2–0	0–1	0–0	2–3	2–3	3–3	1–2	2–0	0–2	—	2–1	3–0	0–2
Sunderland	2–2	1–0	4–2	1–1	1–0	2–1	1–1	2–1	4–5	2–0	1–1	4–2	1–1	1–1	2–2	2–0	1–1	4–1	3–0	1–1	3–0	—	2–1	1–1
Walsall	0–1	0–1	0–1	0–0	3–2	1–3	1–3	0–2	2–1	1–4	2–0	2–1	2–2	1–3	3–0	2–1	2–3	1–2	1–2	0–0	1–1	2–2	—	3–2
Wycombe Wanderers	1–3	1–2	1–0	0–0	0–0	1–2	2–1	0–1	0–2	3–2	1–0	0–1	1–1	0–0	1–0	1–0	2–3	3–0	3–2	3–2	2–3	1–1	1–0	—

Updated to match(es) played on 4 May 2019. Source: EFL Official Website
Legend: Blue = home team win; Yellow = draw; Red = away team win.
For upcoming matches, an "a" indicates there is an article about the rivalry between the two participants.

== League Two ==
=== Table ===
Pos	Team	Pld	W	D	L	GF	GA	GD	Pts	Promotion, qualification or relegation
1	Lincoln City (C, P)	46	23	16	7	73	43	+30	85	Promotion to EFL League One
2	Bury (P)	46	22	13	11	82	56	+26	79	Promotion to EFL League One
3	Milton Keynes Dons (P)	46	23	10	13	71	49	+22	79	Promotion to EFL League One
4	Mansfield Town	46	20	16	10	69	41	+28	76	Qualification for League Two play-offs (Note: Four teams play for one spot and promotion to EFL League One.)
5	Forest Green Rovers	46	20	14	12	68	47	+21	74	Qualification for League Two play-offs
6	Tranmere Rovers (O, P)	46	20	13	13	63	50	+13	73	Qualification for League Two play-offs
7	Newport County	46	20	11	15	59	59	0	71	Qualification for League Two play-offs
8	Colchester United	46	20	10	16	65	53	+12	70	
9	Exeter City	46	19	13	14	60	49	+11	70	
10	Stevenage	46	20	10	16	59	55	+4	70	
11	Carlisle United	46	20	8	18	67	62	+5	68	
12	Crewe Alexandra	46	19	8	19	60	59	+1	65	
13	Swindon Town	46	16	16	14	59	56	+3	64	
14	Oldham Athletic	46	16	14	16	67	60	+7	62	
15	Northampton Town	46	14	19	13	64	63	+1	61	
16	Cheltenham Town	46	15	12	19	57	68	−11	57	
17	Grimsby Town	46	16	8	22	45	56	−11	56	
18	Morecambe	46	14	12	20	54	70	−16	54	
19	Crawley Town	46	15	8	23	51	68	−17	53	
20	Port Vale	46	12	13	21	39	55	−16	49	
21	Cambridge United	46	12	11	23	40	66	−26	47	
22	Macclesfield Town	46	10	14	22	48	74	−26	44	
23	Notts County (R)	46	9	14	23	48	84	−36	41	Relegation to the National League
24	Yeovil Town (R)	46	9	13	24	41	66	−25	40	Relegation to the National League

Source: EFL Official Website
Rules for classification: 1) Points; 2) Goal difference; 3) Number of goals scored; 4) Head-to-head results
(C) Champions; (O) Play-off winners; (P) Promoted; (R) Relegated

=== Play-offs ===
Semi-finals
4	Mansfield Town	1	0	1 (3)
7	Newport County (p)	1	0	1 (5)
5	Forest Green Rovers	0	1	1
6	Tranmere Rovers	1	1	2

Final
7	Newport County	0
6	Tranmere Rovers	1

=== Results ===
Home \ Away	BUR	CAM	CAR	CHL	COL	CRA	CRE	EXE	FGR	GRI	LIN	MAC	MAN	MKD	MOR	NEW	NOR	NOT	OLD	POR	STE	SWI	TRA	YEO
Bury	—	0–3	0–1	4–1	2–0	1–1	3–1	2–0	1–1	4–0	3–3	3–0	2–2	4–3	3–2	1–1	3–1	4–0	3–1	1–1	4–0	1–3	2–1	1–0
Cambridge United	2–2	—	1–2	0–1	0–1	2–1	0–0	0–2	1–3	1–0	1–2	1–0	1–1	0–1	1–2	0–3	3–2	3–2	1–1	1–0	2–0	0–0	0–0	0–0
Carlisle United	3–2	2–2	—	2–0	4–0	4–2	1–0	1–1	1–2	0–1	1–0	2–1	3–2	2–3	0–2	3–2	2–2	1–3	6–0	2–1	0–1	2–1	0–2	0–1
Cheltenham Town	1–1	2–0	0–1	—	1–3	0–1	0–0	1–1	2–2	2–1	0–2	3–2	2–2	3–1	2–2	2–1	3–1	4–1	0–0	1–0	0–2	3–2	1–3	1–0
Colchester United	1–2	3–0	1–1	3–0	—	3–1	6–0	1–1	0–3	1–0	1–0	1–0	2–3	2–0	0–0	3–0	1–2	3–3	0–2	2–0	1–2	1–0	0–2	3–1
Crawley Town	3–2	2–0	2–3	1–0	2–0	—	3–0	1–1	1–2	2–1	0–3	1–1	0–0	0–4	2–0	4–1	0–1	1–1	0–3	0–1	1–3	2–2	3–1	3–1
Crewe Alexandra	1–1	2–0	2–1	1–3	2–1	6–1	—	1–2	4–3	2–0	2–1	3–0	0–3	0–0	6–0	3–2	0–2	3–0	0–2	0–1	1–0	1–0	3–2	2–0
Exeter City	0–1	1–0	3–1	3–1	3–0	1–3	1–0	—	1–2	1–2	0–3	0–1	1–4	3–1	0–0	1–1	2–2	5–1	1–0	2–0	1–0	2–0	0–1	2–1
Forest Green Rovers	1–2	2–1	1–1	1–1	0–1	1–0	1–0	0–0	—	3–0	1–2	2–0	1–1	1–2	0–1	1–1	2–1	1–2	1–1	1–1	0–0	1–1	3–1	3–0
Grimsby Town	0–0	0–2	1–0	1–0	1–0	1–0	2–0	0–0	1–4	—	1–1	0–2	0–1	1–0	1–2	3–0	0–0	4–0	0–3	2–0	0–2	2–1	5–2	0–1
Lincoln City	2–1	1–1	2–2	1–1	0–3	0–1	1–0	1–1	2–1	1–0	—	1–1	1–1	2–1	3–1	3–2	1–1	3–1	2–0	1–1	2–2	4–1	0–0	1–0
Macclesfield Town	1–4	1–1	2–1	1–1	1–1	2–0	3–3	3–2	1–1	0–2	1–2	—	1–1	1–3	1–1	0–0	0–5	0–1	2–1	0–0	2–2	1–2	1–1	1–0
Mansfield Town	2–1	1–0	1–0	4–2	1–1	1–0	1–2	1–2	1–0	2–1	1–1	3–1	—	1–1	4–0	3–0	4–0	2–0	0–0	1–0	1–2	0–0	3–0	0–1
Milton Keynes Dons	1–0	6–0	2–0	3–0	0–1	1–0	0–1	1–0	1–1	1–1	0–2	2–0	1–0	—	2–0	2–0	1–0	2–1	2–1	1–1	1–1	2–3	1–1	2–0
Morecambe	2–3	3–0	0–2	4–0	0–1	1–0	2–2	0–2	3–0	1–1	0–2	2–1	0–1	4–2	—	1–1	1–0	1–1	0–2	2–2	1–2	0–1	3–4	2–1
Newport County	3–1	4–2	2–0	1–0	2–0	0–0	1–0	1–0	1–4	1–0	1–0	3–3	1–0	0–1	1–1	—	3–1	3–2	2–0	0–0	2–1	0–0	0–0	0–6
Northampton Town	0–0	2–2	3–0	1–3	0–4	0–0	2–0	2–1	2–1	2–2	0–1	3–1	1–1	2–2	1–1	1–0	—	0–0	2–1	1–2	1–1	1–1	1–1	2–2
Notts County	0–0	0–1	1–1	0–3	0–0	3–1	2–1	0–1	1–3	2–1	1–1	1–2	1–0	1–2	0–0	1–4	2–2	—	0–0	0–0	3–3	1–2	3–2	0–4
Oldham Athletic	4–2	3–1	1–3	2–0	3–3	2–1	1–1	2–3	0–0	2–0	1–1	3–1	3–2	1–2	1–2	0–1	2–5	2–0	—	0–1	1–1	2–2	2–0	4–1
Port Vale	1–0	3–0	0–1	2–2	0–3	1–0	1–0	1–1	0–2	0–1	2–6	0–1	2–1	0–2	0–1	1–2	2–0	2–2	1–4	—	1–4	0–1	1–2	3–0
Stevenage	0–1	0–1	3–0	2–0	3–1	2–1	0–1	1–1	0–2	1–0	0–1	1–0	1–3	3–2	1–0	1–0	1–2	0–3	3–2	0–0	—	2–0	2–2	1–0
Swindon Town	1–2	0–2	0–4	0–0	3–0	0–1	1–2	0–2	2–0	1–1	2–2	3–2	0–0	1–1	4–0	2–1	1–1	3–1	0–0	0–0	3–2	—	3–2	1–1
Tranmere Rovers	1–1	1–0	3–0	1–0	1–1	5–1	1–0	2–0	0–1	4–1	1–0	1–0	0–0	2–1	3–1	0–1	1–2	1–0	1–1	1–0	2–0	1–2	—	0–0
Yeovil Town	0–1	1–0	0–0	1–4	1–1	0–1	1–1	2–2	1–2	1–3	0–2	0–2	2–2	1–1	3–2	1–3	1–1	2–0	0–0	0–3	2–0	0–3	0–0	—

Updated to match(es) played on 4 May 2019. Source: EFL Official Website
Legend: Blue = home team win; Yellow = draw; Red = away team win.
For upcoming matches, an "a" indicates there is an article about the rivalry between the two participants.

== Managerial changes ==
Team	Outgoing manager	Manner of departure	Date of vacancy	Position in table	Incoming manager	Date of appointment	Position in table
Charlton Athletic	(England) Karl Robinson	Signed by Oxford United	22 March 2018	2017–18 season	(England) Lee Bowyer	6 September 2018	10th
Scunthorpe United	(Scotland) Graham Alexander	Sacked	24 March 2018	2017–18 season	(England) Nick Daws	25 May 2018	Pre-season
West Bromwich Albion	(England) Alan Pardew	Sacked	2 April 2018	2017–18 Premier League season	(Jamaica) Darren Moore	18 May 2018	Pre-season
Northampton Town	(Netherlands) Jimmy Floyd Hasselbaink	Sacked	2 April 2018	2017–18 season	(England) Dean Austin	12 May 2018	Pre-season
Ipswich Town	(Republic of Ireland) Mick McCarthy	Resigned	10 April 2018	2017–18 season	(England) Paul Hurst	30 May 2018	Pre-season
Milton Keynes Dons	(England) Dan Micciche	Sacked	22 April 2018	2017–18 season	(England) Paul Tisdale	6 June 2018	Pre-season
Sunderland	(Wales) Chris Coleman	Released	29 April 2018	2017–18 season	(Scotland) Jack Ross	25 May 2018	Pre-season
Carlisle United	(England) Keith Curle	Resigned	5 May 2018	Pre-season	(Republic of Ireland) John Sheridan	5 June 2018	Pre-season
Barnsley	(Portugal) José Morais	Sacked	6 May 2018	Pre-season	(Germany) Daniel Stendel	6 June 2018	Pre-season
Bradford City	(England) Simon Grayson	End of contract	8 May 2018	Pre-season	(Republic of Ireland) Michael Collins	18 June 2018	Pre-season
Queens Park Rangers	(England) Ian Holloway	Sacked	10 May 2018	Pre-season	(England) Steve McClaren	18 May 2018	Pre-season
Swansea City	(Portugal) Carlos Carvalhal	End of contract	18 May 2018	Pre-season	(England) Graham Potter	11 June 2018	Pre-season
Stoke City	(Scotland) Paul Lambert	Sacked	18 May 2018	Pre-season	(England) Gary Rowett	22 May 2018	Pre-season
Derby County	(England) Gary Rowett	Signed by Stoke City	22 May 2018	Pre-season	(England) Frank Lampard	31 May 2018	Pre-season
Shrewsbury Town	(England) Paul Hurst	Signed by Ipswich Town	30 May 2018	Pre-season	(England) John Askey	1 June 2018	Pre-season
Leeds United	(England) Paul Heckingbottom	Sacked	1 June 2018	Pre-season	(Argentina) Marcelo Bielsa	15 June 2018	Pre-season
Exeter City	(England) Paul Tisdale	End of contract	1 June 2018	Pre-season	(England) Matt Taylor	1 June 2018	Pre-season
Macclesfield Town	(England) John Askey	Signed by Shrewsbury Town	1 June 2018	Pre-season	(England) Mark Yates	19 June 2018	Pre-season
Fleetwood Town	(Republic of Ireland) John Sheridan	End of contract	2 June 2018	Pre-season	(England) Joey Barton	2 June 2018	Pre-season
Doncaster Rovers	(Scotland) Darren Ferguson	Resigned	4 June 2018	Pre-season	(Northern Ireland) Grant McCann	27 June 2018	Pre-season
Oldham Athletic	(England) Richie Wellens	Sacked	8 June 2018	Pre-season	(England) Frankie Bunn	13 June 2018	Pre-season
Blackpool	(England) Gary Bowyer	Resigned	8 August 2018	12th	(England) Terry McPhillips	10 September 2018	9th
Cheltenham Town	(England) Gary Johnson	Sacked	21 August 2018	22nd	(Northern Ireland) Michael Duff	10 September 2018	18th
Scunthorpe United	(England) Nick Daws	Sacked	24 August 2018	18th	(Scotland) Stuart McCall	24 August 2018	18th
Notts County	(England) Kevin Nolan	Sacked	26 August 2018	24th	(Australia) Harry Kewell	31 August 2018	24th
Crawley Town	(Australia) Harry Kewell	Signed by Notts County	31 August 2018	14th	(Italy) Gabriele Cioffi	7 September 2018	16th
Bradford City	(Republic of Ireland) Michael Collins	Sacked	3 September 2018	17th	(Scotland) David Hopkin	4 September 2018	17th
Northampton Town	(England) Dean Austin	Sacked	30 September 2018	21st	(England) Keith Curle	1 October 2018	21st
Aston Villa	(England) Steve Bruce	Sacked	3 October 2018	12th	(England) Dean Smith	10 October 2018	15th
Macclesfield Town	(England) Mark Yates	Sacked	8 October 2018	24th	(England) Sol Campbell	27 November 2018	
Brentford	(England) Dean Smith	Signed by Aston Villa	10 October 2018	6th	(Denmark) Thomas Frank	16 October 2018	7th
Ipswich Town	(England) Paul Hurst	Sacked	25 October 2018	24th	(Scotland) Paul Lambert	26 October 2018	24th
Swindon Town	(England) Phil Brown	Sacked	12 November 2018	17th	(England) Richie Wellens	13 November 2018	17th
AFC Wimbledon	(England) Neal Ardley	Mutual consent	12 November 2018	23rd	(England) Wally Downes	4 December 2018	23rd
Shrewsbury Town	(England) John Askey	Sacked	12 November 2018	18th	(Wales) Sam Ricketts	3 December 2018	15th
Notts County	(Australia) Harry Kewell	Sacked	13 November 2018	22nd	(England) Neal Ardley	23 November 2018	23rd
Cambridge United	(Republic of Ireland) Joe Dunne	Sacked	1 December 2018	21st	(Scotland) Colin Calderwood	19 December 2018	22nd
Reading	(England) Paul Clement	Sacked	6 December 2018	21st	(Portugal) José Gomes	22 December 2018	21st
Bristol Rovers	(England) Darrell Clarke	Mutual consent	13 December 2018	21st	(Republic of Ireland) Graham Coughlan	6 January 2019	20th
Sheffield Wednesday	(Netherlands) Jos Luhukay	Sacked	21 December 2018	18th	(England) Steve Bruce	2 January 2019	16th
Oldham Athletic	(England) Frankie Bunn	Sacked	27 December 2018	12th	(England) Paul Scholes	11 February 2019	14th
Carlisle United	(Republic of Ireland) John Sheridan	Resigned	4 January 2019	7th	(Scotland) Steven Pressley	16 January 2019	6th
Stoke City	(England) Gary Rowett	Sacked	8 January 2019	14th	(Wales) Nathan Jones	9 January 2019	14th
Luton Town	(Wales) Nathan Jones	Signed by Stoke City	9 January 2019	2nd	(England) Graeme Jones	7 May 2019	1st
Nottingham Forest	(Spain) Aitor Karanka	Resigned	11 January 2019	7th	(Northern Ireland) Martin O'Neill	15 January 2019	9th
Peterborough United	(Scotland) Steve Evans	Sacked	26 January 2019	6th	(Scotland) Darren Ferguson	26 January 2019	6th
Port Vale	(England) Neil Aspin	Resigned	30 January 2019	18th	(England) John Askey	4 February 2019	18th
Bradford City	(Scotland) David Hopkin	Resigned	25 February 2019	23rd	(England) Gary Bowyer	4 March 2019	23rd
Rochdale	(England) Keith Hill	Sacked	4 March 2019	22nd	(Republic of Ireland) Brian Barry-Murphy	3 April 2019	23rd
West Bromwich Albion	(Jamaica) Darren Moore	Sacked	9 March 2019	4th	(Croatia) Slaven Bilić	13 June 2019	2019–20 season
Oldham Athletic	(England) Paul Scholes	Resigned	14 March 2019	14th	(France) Laurent Banide	11 June 2019	2019–20 season
Scunthorpe United	(Scotland) Stuart McCall	Sacked	24 March 2019	18th	(England) Paul Hurst	13 May 2019	2019–20 season
Yeovil Town	(England) Darren Way	Sacked	24 March 2019	22nd	(England) Darren Sarll	19 June 2019	2019–20 National League season
Southend United	(England) Chris Powell	Sacked	26 March 2019	20th	(England) Kevin Bond	2 April 2019	20th
Queens Park Rangers	(England) Steve McClaren	Sacked	1 April 2019	17th	(England) Mark Warburton	9 May 2019	2019–20 season
Walsall	(England) Dean Keates	Sacked	6 April 2019	22nd	(England) Darrell Clarke	10 May 2019	2019–20 season
Gillingham	(Wales) Steve Lovell	Sacked	26 April 2019	12th	(Scotland) Steve Evans	1 June 2019	2019–20 season
Plymouth Argyle	(Scotland) Derek Adams	Sacked	28 April 2019	21st	(England) Ryan Lowe	5 June 2019	2019–20 season
