= 2017–18 English Football League =

119th season of the English Football League

English Football League
- Season: 2017–18
- Champions: Wolverhampton Wanderers
- Promoted: Cardiff City; Fulham
- Relegated: Barnet; Chesterfield
- New clubs in league: Lincoln City; Forest Green Rovers

The 2017–18 English Football League (known as the Sky Bet Football League for sponsorship reasons) was the 119th season of the English Football League and was the second under its current name. It began on 4 August 2017 and concluded on 6 May 2018, with the promotion play-off finals at Wembley Stadium on 26–28 May 2018. The EFL is contested through three divisions. The divisions are the Championship, League One and League Two. The winner and the runner-up of the Championship are automatically promoted to the Premier League and they are joined by the winner of the Championship play-off. The bottom two teams in League Two are relegated to the National League.

== Promotion and relegation ==
=== From the Premier League ===
Relegated to the Championship

- Hull City
- Middlesbrough
- Sunderland

=== From the Championship ===
Promoted to the Premier League

- Brighton & Hove Albion
- Newcastle United
- Huddersfield Town

Relegated to League One

- Rotherham United
- Wigan Athletic
- Blackburn Rovers

=== From League One ===
Promoted to the Championship

- Sheffield United
- Bolton Wanderers
- Millwall

Relegated to League Two

- Chesterfield
- Coventry City
- Swindon Town
- Port Vale

=== From League Two ===
Promoted to League One

- Doncaster Rovers
- Plymouth Argyle
- Portsmouth
- Blackpool

Relegated to the National League

- Leyton Orient
- Hartlepool United

=== From the National League ===
Promoted to League Two

- Lincoln City
- Forest Green Rovers

== Championship ==
=== Table ===
Pos	Team	Pld	W	D	L	GF	GA	GD	Pts	Promotion, qualification or relegation
1	Wolverhampton Wanderers (C, P)	46	30	9	7	82	39	+43	99	Promotion to the Premier League
2	Cardiff City (P)	46	27	9	10	69	39	+30	90	Promotion to the Premier League
3	Fulham (O, P)	46	25	13	8	79	46	+33	88	Qualification for Championship play-offs (Note: Four teams play for one spot and promotion to the Premier League.)
4	Aston Villa	46	24	11	11	72	42	+30	83	Qualification for Championship play-offs
5	Middlesbrough	46	22	10	14	67	45	+22	76	Qualification for Championship play-offs
6	Derby County	46	20	15	11	70	48	+22	75	Qualification for Championship play-offs
7	Preston North End	46	19	16	11	57	46	+11	73	
8	Millwall	46	19	15	12	56	45	+11	72	
9	Brentford	46	18	15	13	62	52	+10	69	
10	Sheffield United	46	20	9	17	62	55	+7	69	
11	Bristol City	46	17	16	13	67	58	+9	67	
12	Ipswich Town	46	17	9	20	57	60	−3	60	
13	Leeds United	46	17	9	20	59	64	−5	60	
14	Norwich City	46	15	15	16	49	60	−11	60	
15	Sheffield Wednesday	46	14	15	17	59	60	−1	57	
16	Queens Park Rangers	46	15	11	20	58	70	−12	56	
17	Nottingham Forest	46	15	8	23	51	65	−14	53	
18	Hull City	46	11	16	19	70	70	0	49	
19	Birmingham City	46	13	7	26	38	68	−30	46	
20	Reading	46	10	14	22	48	70	−22	44	
21	Bolton Wanderers	46	10	13	23	39	74	−35	43	
22	Barnsley (R)	46	9	14	23	48	72	−24	41	Relegation to EFL League One
23	Burton Albion (R)	46	10	11	25	38	81	−43	41	Relegation to EFL League One
24	Sunderland (R)	46	7	16	23	52	80	−28	37	Relegation to EFL League One

Source: English Football League
Rules for classification: 1) Points; 2) Goal difference; 3) Number of goals scored
(C) Champions; (O) Play-off winners; (P) Promoted; (R) Relegated

=== Play-offs ===
Semi-finals
3	Fulham	0	2	2
6	Derby County	1	0	1
4	Aston Villa	1	0	1
5	Middlesbrough	0	0	0

Final
3	Fulham	1
4	Aston Villa	0

=== Results ===
Home \ Away	AST	BAR	BIR	BOL	BRE	BRI	BRT	CAR	DER	FUL	HUL	IPS	LEE	MID	MIL	NOR	NOT	PNE	QPR	REA	SHU	SHW	SUN	WOL
Aston Villa	—	3–1	2–0	1–0	0–0	5–0	3–2	1–0	1–1	2–1	1–1	2–0	1–0	0–0	0–0	4–2	2–1	1–1	1–3	3–0	2–2	1–2	2–1	4–1
Barnsley	0–3	—	2–0	2–2	2–0	2–2	1–2	0–1	0–3	1–3	0–1	1–2	0–2	2–2	0–2	1–1	2–1	0–0	1–1	1–1	3–2	1–1	3–0	0–0
Birmingham City	0–0	0–2	—	0–0	0–2	2–1	1–1	1–0	0–3	3–1	3–0	1–0	1–0	0–1	0–1	0–2	1–0	1–3	1–2	0–2	2–1	1–0	3–1	0–1
Bolton Wanderers	1–0	3–1	0–1	—	0–3	1–0	0–1	2–0	1–2	1–1	1–0	1–1	2–3	0–3	0–2	2–1	3–2	1–3	1–1	2–2	0–1	2–1	1–0	0–4
Brentford	2–1	0–0	5–0	2–0	—	2–2	1–1	1–3	1–1	3–1	1–1	1–0	3–1	1–1	1–0	0–1	3–4	1–1	2–1	1–1	1–1	2–0	3–3	0–0
Bristol City	1–1	3–1	3–1	2–0	0–1	—	0–0	2–1	4–1	1–1	5–5	1–0	0–3	2–1	0–0	0–1	2–1	1–2	2–0	2–0	2–3	4–0	3–3	1–2
Burton Albion	0–4	2–4	2–1	2–0	0–2	0–0	—	0–1	3–1	2–1	0–5	1–2	1–2	1–1	0–1	0–0	0–0	1–2	1–3	1–3	1–3	1–1	0–2	0–4
Cardiff City	3–0	2–1	3–2	2–0	2–0	1–0	3–1	—	0–0	2–4	1–0	3–1	3–1	1–0	0–0	3–1	2–1	0–1	2–1	0–0	2–0	1–1	4–0	0–1
Derby County	2–0	4–1	1–1	3–0	3–0	0–0	1–0	3–1	—	1–2	5–0	0–1	2–2	1–2	3–0	1–1	2–0	1–0	2–0	2–4	1–1	2–0	1–4	0–2
Fulham	2–0	2–1	1–0	1–1	1–1	0–2	6–0	1–1	1–1	—	2–1	4–1	2–0	1–1	1–0	1–1	2–0	2–2	2–2	1–0	3–0	0–1	2–1	2–0
Hull City	0–0	1–1	6–1	4–0	3–2	2–3	4–1	0–2	0–0	2–2	—	2–2	0–0	1–3	1–2	4–3	2–3	1–2	4–0	0–0	1–0	0–1	1–1	2–3
Ipswich Town	0–4	1–0	1–0	2–0	2–0	1–3	0–0	0–1	1–2	0–2	0–3	—	1–0	2–2	2–2	0–1	4–2	3–0	0–0	2–0	0–0	2–2	5–2	0–1
Leeds United	1–1	2–1	2–0	2–1	1–0	2–2	5–0	1–4	1–2	0–0	1–0	3–2	—	2–1	3–4	1–0	0–0	0–0	2–0	0–1	1–2	1–2	1–1	0–3
Middlesbrough	0–1	3–1	2–0	2–0	2–2	2–1	2–0	0–1	0–3	0–1	3–1	2–0	3–0	—	2–0	0–1	2–0	0–0	3–2	2–1	1–0	0–0	1–0	1–2
Millwall	1–0	1–3	2–0	1–1	1–0	2–0	0–1	1–1	0–0	0–3	0–0	3–4	1–0	2–1	—	4–0	2–0	1–1	1–0	2–1	3–1	2–1	1–1	2–2
Norwich City	3–1	1–1	1–0	0–0	1–2	0–0	0–0	0–2	1–2	0–2	1–1	1–1	2–1	1–0	2–1	—	0–0	1–1	2–0	3–2	1–2	3–1	1–3	0–2
Nottingham Forest	0–1	3–0	2–1	3–2	0–1	0–0	2–0	0–2	0–0	1–3	0–2	2–1	0–2	2–1	1–0	1–0	—	0–3	4–0	1–1	2–1	0–3	0–1	1–2
Preston North End	0–2	1–1	1–1	0–0	2–3	2–1	2–1	3–0	0–1	1–2	2–1	0–1	3–1	2–3	0–0	0–0	1–1	—	1–0	1–0	1–0	1–0	2–2	1–1
Queens Park Rangers	1–2	1–0	3–1	2–0	2–2	1–1	0–0	2–1	1–1	1–2	2–1	2–1	1–3	0–3	2–2	4–1	2–5	1–2	—	2–0	1–0	4–2	1–0	2–1
Reading	2–1	3–0	0–2	1–1	0–1	0–1	1–2	2–2	3–3	1–1	1–1	0–4	2–2	0–2	0–2	1–2	3–1	1–0	1–0	—	1–3	0–0	2–2	0–2
Sheffield United	0–1	1–0	1–1	0–1	1–0	1–2	2–0	1–1	3–1	4–5	4–1	1–0	2–1	2–1	1–1	0–1	0–0	0–1	2–1	2–1	—	0–0	3–0	2–0
Sheffield Wednesday	2–4	1–1	1–3	1–1	2–1	0–0	0–3	0–0	2–0	0–1	2–2	1–2	3–0	1–2	2–1	5–1	3–1	4–1	1–1	3–0	2–4	—	1–1	0–1
Sunderland	0–3	0–1	1–1	3–3	0–2	1–2	1–2	1–2	1–1	1–0	1–0	0–2	0–2	3–3	2–2	1–1	0–1	0–2	1–1	1–3	1–2	1–3	—	3–0
Wolverhampton Wanderers	2–0	2–1	2–0	5–1	3–0	3–3	3–1	1–2	2–0	2–0	2–2	1–0	4–1	1–0	1–0	2–2	0–2	3–2	2–1	3–0	3–0	0–0	0–0	—

Source: BBC Sport
Legend: Blue = home team win; Yellow = draw; Red = away team win.
For upcoming matches, an "a" indicates there is an article about the rivalry between the two participants.

== League One ==
=== Table ===
Pos	Team	Pld	W	D	L	GF	GA	GD	Pts	Promotion, qualification or relegation
1	Wigan Athletic (C, P)	46	29	11	6	89	29	+60	98	Promotion to the EFL Championship
2	Blackburn Rovers (P)	46	28	12	6	82	40	+42	96	Promotion to the EFL Championship
3	Shrewsbury Town	46	25	12	9	60	39	+21	87	Qualification for League One play-offs (Note: Four teams play for one spot and promotion to the EFL Championship.)
4	Rotherham United (O, P)	46	24	7	15	73	53	+20	79	Qualification for League One play-offs
5	Scunthorpe United	46	19	17	10	65	50	+15	74	Qualification for League One play-offs
6	Charlton Athletic	46	20	11	15	58	51	+7	71	Qualification for League One play-offs
7	Plymouth Argyle	46	19	11	16	58	59	−1	68	
8	Portsmouth	46	20	6	20	57	56	+1	66	
9	Peterborough United	46	17	13	16	68	60	+8	64	
10	Southend United	46	17	12	17	58	62	−4	63	
11	Bradford City	46	18	9	19	57	67	−10	63	
12	Blackpool	46	15	15	16	60	55	+5	60	
13	Bristol Rovers	46	16	11	19	60	66	−6	59	
14	Fleetwood Town	46	16	9	21	59	68	−9	57	
15	Doncaster Rovers	46	13	17	16	52	52	0	56	
16	Oxford United	46	15	11	20	61	66	−5	56	
17	Gillingham	46	13	17	16	50	55	−5	56	
18	AFC Wimbledon	46	13	14	19	47	58	−11	53	
19	Walsall	46	13	13	20	53	66	−13	52	
20	Rochdale	46	11	18	17	49	57	−8	51	
21	Oldham Athletic (R)	46	11	17	18	58	75	−17	50	Relegation to EFL League Two
22	Northampton Town (R)	46	12	11	23	43	77	−34	47	Relegation to EFL League Two
23	Milton Keynes Dons (R)	46	11	12	23	43	69	−26	45	Relegation to EFL League Two
24	Bury (R)	46	8	12	26	41	71	−30	36	Relegation to EFL League Two

Source: BBC Sport
Rules for classification: 1) Points; 2) Goal difference; 3) Number of goals scored
(C) Champions; (O) Play-off winners; (P) Promoted; (R) Relegated

=== Play-offs ===
Semi-finals
3	Shrewsbury Town	1	1	2
6	Charlton Athletic	0	0	0
4	Rotherham United	2	2	4
5	Scunthorpe United	2	0	2

Final
3	Shrewsbury Town	1
4	Rotherham United	2

=== Results ===
Home \ Away	WIM	BLB	BLP	BRA	BRR	BRY	CHA	DON	FLE	GIL	MKD	NOR	OLD	OXF	PET	PLY	POR	ROC	ROT	SCU	SHR	STD	WAL	WIG
AFC Wimbledon		0–3	2–0	2–1	1–0	2–2	1–0	2–0	0–1	1–1	0–2	1–3	2–2	2–1	2–2	0–1	0–2	0–0	3–1	1–1	0–1	2–0	1–2	0–4
Blackburn Rovers	0–1		3–0	2–0	2–1	2–0	2–0	1–3	2–2	1–0	4–1	1–1	2–2	2–1	3–1	1–1	3–0	2–0	2–0	2–2	3–1	1–0	3–1	2–2
Blackpool	1–0	2–4		5–0	0–0	2–1	1–0	1–2	2–1	1–1	1–0	3–0	2–1	3–1	1–1	2–2	2–3	0–0	1–2	2–3	1–1	1–1	2–2	1–3
Bradford City	0–4	0–1	2–1		3–1	2–2	0–1	2–0	0–3	1–0	2–0	1–2	1–1	3–2	1–3	0–1	3–1	4–3	1–0	1–2	0–0	0–2	1–1	0–1
Bristol Rovers	1–3	1–1	3–1	3–1		2–1	1–1	0–1	3–1	1–1	2–0	1–1	2–3	0–1	1–4	2–1	2–1	3–2	2–1	1–1	1–2	3–0	2–1	1–1
Bury	2–1	0–3	1–1	3–1	2–3		0–1	0–1	0–2	2–1	0–2	2–3	2–2	3–0	0–1	0–0	1–0	0–2	0–3	0–1	1–0	0–0	1–0	0–2
Charlton Athletic	1–0	1–0	1–1	1–1	1–0	1–1		1–0	0–0	1–2	2–2	4–1	1–0	2–3	2–2	2–0	0–1	2–1	3–1	0–1	0–2	2–1	3–1	0–3
Doncaster Rovers	0–0	0–1	3–3	2–0	1–3	3–3	1–1		3–0	0–0	2–1	3–0	1–1	0–1	0–0	1–1	2–1	2–0	1–1	0–1	1–2	4–1	0–3	0–1
Fleetwood Town	2–0	1–2	0–0	1–2	2–0	3–2	1–3	0–0		0–2	1–1	2–0	2–2	2–0	2–3	1–1	1–2	2–2	2–0	2–3	1–2	2–4	2–0	0–4
Gillingham	2–2	0–0	0–3	0–1	4–1	1–1	1–0	0–0	2–1		1–2	1–2	0–0	1–1	1–1	5–2	0–1	2–1	0–1	0–0	1–2	3–3	0–0	1–1
Milton Keynes Dons	0–0	1–2	0–0	1–4	0–1	2–1	1–2	1–2	1–0	1–0		0–0	4–4	1–1	1–0	0–1	1–2	3–2	3–2	0–2	1–1	1–1	1–1	0–1
Northampton Town	0–1	1–1	1–0	0–1	0–6	0–0	0–4	1–0	0–1	1–2	2–1		2–2	0–0	1–4	2–0	3–1	0–1	0–3	0–3	1–1	3–1	2–1	0–1
Oldham Athletic	0–0	1–0	2–1	2–1	1–1	2–1	3–4	0–0	1–2	1–1	1–0	5–1		0–2	3–2	1–2	0–2	3–1	1–1	2–3	1–2	0–3	1–1	0–2
Oxford United	3–0	2–4	1–0	2–2	1–2	1–2	1–1	1–0	0–1	3–0	3–1	1–2	0–0		2–1	0–1	3–0	2–1	3–3	1–1	1–1	2–0	1–2	0–7
Peterborough United	1–1	2–3	0–1	1–3	1–1	3–0	4–1	1–1	2–0	0–1	2–0	2–0	3–0	1–4		2–1	2–1	0–1	2–1	2–2	1–0	0–1	2–1	3–2
Plymouth Argyle	4–2	2–0	1–3	1–0	3–2	3–0	2–0	0–3	1–2	2–1	0–1	2–0	4–1	0–4	2–1		0–0	1–1	2–1	0–4	1–1	4–0	1–0	1–3
Portsmouth	2–1	1–2	0–2	0–1	3–0	1–0	0–1	2–2	4–1	1–3	2–0	3–1	1–2	3–0	2–0	1–0		2–0	0–1	1–1	0–1	1–0	1–1	2–1
Rochdale	1–1	0–3	1–2	1–1	1–0	0–0	1–0	2–1	0–2	3–0	0–0	2–2	0–0	0–0	2–0	1–1	3–3		0–1	1–1	3–1	0–0	1–1	1–4
Rotherham United	2–0	1–1	1–0	2–0	2–0	3–2	0–2	2–1	3–2	1–3	2–1	1–0	5–1	3–1	1–1	1–1	1–0	0–1		2–0	1–2	5–0	5–1	1–3
Scunthorpe United	1–1	0–1	0–0	1–1	1–0	1–0	2–0	1–1	1–1	1–3	2–2	2–2	0–2	1–0	2–1	2–0	2–0	1–1	1–2		1–2	3–1	1–0	1–2
Shrewsbury Town	1–0	1–1	1–0	0–1	4–0	1–1	0–2	2–2	1–0	1–1	0–1	1–0	1–0	3–2	3–1	1–2	2–0	3–2	0–1	2–0		1–0	2–0	1–0
Southend United	1–0	2–1	2–1	1–2	0–0	1–0	3–1	0–0	1–2	4–0	4–0	2–2	2–0	1–1	1–1	1–1	3–1	0–0	2–0	3–2	1–2		0–3	3–1
Walsall	2–3	1–2	1–1	3–3	0–0	1–0	2–2	4–2	4–2	0–1	1–0	1–0	2–1	2–1	1–1	2–1	0–1	0–3	1–2	1–0	1–1	0–1		0–3
Wigan Athletic	1–1	0–0	0–2	1–2	3–0	4–1	0–0	3–0	2–0	2–0	5–1	1–0	3–0	1–0	0–0	1–0	1–1	1–0	0–0	3–3	0–0	3–0	2–0	

Updated to match(es) played on 1 May 2018. Source: BBC Sport
Legend: Blue = home team win; Yellow = draw; Red = away team win.

== League Two ==
=== Table ===
Pos	Team	Pld	W	D	L	GF	GA	GD	Pts	Promotion, qualification or relegation
1	Accrington Stanley (C, P)	46	29	6	11	76	46	+30	93	Promotion to EFL League One
2	Luton Town (P)	46	25	13	8	94	46	+48	88	Promotion to EFL League One
3	Wycombe Wanderers (P)	46	24	12	10	79	60	+19	84	Promotion to EFL League One
4	Exeter City	46	24	8	14	64	54	+10	80	Qualification for League Two play-offs (Note: Four teams play for one spot and promotion to EFL League One.)
5	Notts County	46	21	14	11	71	48	+23	77	Qualification for League Two play-offs
6	Coventry City (O, P)	46	22	9	15	64	47	+17	75	Qualification for League Two play-offs
7	Lincoln City	46	20	15	11	64	48	+16	75	Qualification for League Two play-offs
8	Mansfield Town	46	18	18	10	67	52	+15	72	
9	Swindon Town	46	20	8	18	67	65	+2	68	
10	Carlisle United	46	17	16	13	62	54	+8	67	
11	Newport County	46	16	16	14	56	58	−2	64	
12	Cambridge United	46	17	13	16	56	60	−4	64	
13	Colchester United	46	16	14	16	53	52	+1	62	
14	Crawley Town	46	16	11	19	58	66	−8	59	
15	Crewe Alexandra	46	17	5	24	62	75	−13	56	
16	Stevenage	46	14	13	19	60	65	−5	55	
17	Cheltenham Town	46	13	12	21	67	73	−6	51	
18	Grimsby Town	46	13	12	21	42	66	−24	51	
19	Yeovil Town	46	12	12	22	59	75	−16	48	
20	Port Vale	46	11	14	21	49	67	−18	47	
21	Forest Green Rovers	46	13	8	25	54	77	−23	47	
22	Morecambe	46	9	19	18	41	56	−15	46	
23	Barnet (R)	46	12	10	24	46	65	−19	46	Relegation to the National League
24	Chesterfield (R)	46	10	8	28	47	83	−36	38	Relegation to the National League

Source: BBC Sport
Rules for classification: 1) Points; 2) Goal difference; 3) Number of goals scored
(C) Champions; (O) Play-off winners; (P) Promoted; (R) Relegated

=== Play-offs ===
Semi-finals
4	Exeter City	0	3	3
7	Lincoln City	0	1	1
5	Notts County	1	1	2
6	Coventry City	1	4	5

Final
4	Exeter City	1
6	Coventry City	3

=== Results ===
Home \ Away	ACC	BAR	CAM	CRL	CHL	CHF	COL	COV	CRA	CRE	EXE	FGR	GRI	LIN	LUT	MAN	MOR	NPC	NTC	PTV	STE	SWI	WYC	YEO
Accrington Stanley		4–1	1–0	3–0	1–1	4–0	3–1	1–0	2–3	1–0	1–1	3–1	1–2	1–0	0–2	2–1	1–0	1–1	1–0	3–2	3–2	2–1	1–0	2–0
Barnet	1–1		3–1	1–3	0–2	3–0	0–1	0–0	1–2	2–1	1–2	1–0	0–2	1–1	1–0	1–1	2–1	2–0	1–0	1–1	0–1	1–2	0–2	1–1
Cambridge United	0–0	1–0		1–2	4–3	2–1	1–0	2–1	3–1	3–1	2–3	3–0	3–1	0–0	1–1	0–0	0–0	1–2	1–0	5–0	1–0	1–3	1–3	2–1
Carlisle United	3–1	1–1	1–1		3–0	2–0	1–1	0–1	2–2	1–0	0–1	1–0	2–0	0–1	1–1	1–1	1–1	1–1	1–1	1–2	0–2	1–2	3–3	4–0
Cheltenham Town	0–2	1–1	0–0	0–1		1–1	3–1	1–6	1–0	1–0	3–4	0–1	2–3	1–0	2–2	3–0	3–0	1–1	1–1	5–1	0–1	2–1	0–2	0–2
Chesterfield	1–2	2–1	2–3	2–2	0–2		0–0	0–0	1–2	0–2	1–0	3–2	1–3	1–3	2–0	0–1	0–2	1–0	3–1	2–0	0–1	2–1	1–2	2–3
Colchester United	0–1	0–1	0–0	0–1	1–4	1–1		2–1	3–1	3–1	3–1	5–1	1–1	1–0	2–1	2–0	0–0	2–0	1–3	1–1	1–1	0–0	1–2	0–1
Coventry City	0–2	1–0	3–1	2–0	2–1	1–0	0–0		1–1	1–0	2–0	0–1	4–0	2–4	2–2	0–1	0–0	0–1	3–0	1–0	3–1	3–1	3–2	2–6
Crawley Town	2–1	2–0	0–1	0–1	3–5	0–2	0–2	1–2		1–2	3–1	1–1	3–0	3–1	0–0	2–0	1–1	1–2	0–1	1–3	1–0	1–1	2–3	2–0
Crewe Alexandra	0–2	1–0	0–1	0–5	2–1	5–1	1–0	1–2	3–0		1–2	3–1	2–0	1–4	1–2	2–2	1–0	1–1	2–0	2–2	1–0	0–3	2–3	0–0
Exeter City	2–0	2–1	1–0	1–1	2–1	2–1	1–0	1–0	2–2	3–0		2–0	2–0	1–0	1–4	0–1	4–1	1–0	0–3	0–1	2–1	3–1	1–1	0–0
Forest Green Rovers	0–1	2–2	5–2	0–1	1–1	4–1	1–2	2–1	2–0	3–2	1–3		0–3	0–1	0–2	2–0	2–0	0–4	1–2	1–0	3–1	0–2	1–2	4–3
Grimsby Town	0–3	2–2	0–0	0–1	1–1	1–0	2–2	0–2	0–0	1–0	0–1	1–0		0–0	0–1	1–1	0–2	1–2	2–1	1–1	0–0	3–2	2–3	2–1
Lincoln City	2–0	2–1	0–0	4–1	1–0	2–1	2–1	1–2	0–0	1–4	3–2	2–1	3–1		0–0	0–1	1–1	3–1	2–2	3–1	3–0	2–2	0–0	1–1
Luton Town	1–2	2–0	7–0	3–0	2–2	1–0	3–0	0–3	4–1	3–1	1–0	3–1	2–0	4–2		2–1	1–0	3–1	1–1	2–0	7–1	0–3	2–3	8–2
Mansfield Town	0–1	3–1	2–1	3–1	3–2	2–2	1–1	1–1	1–1	3–4	1–1	2–0	4–1	1–1	2–2		2–1	5–0	3–1	1–1	1–0	1–3	0–0	0–0
Morecambe	1–2	0–1	0–0	1–1	2–1	2–2	0–0	2–0	0–1	0–1	2–1	1–1	0–0	0–0	0–0	1–2		2–1	1–4	0–3	1–1	0–1	2–1	4–3
Newport County	2–1	1–2	2–1	3–3	1–0	4–1	1–2	1–1	2–1	1–2	2–1	3–3	1–0	0–0	1–1	1–1	1–1		0–0	1–1	0–1	2–1	0–0	2–0
Notts County	2–2	2–1	3–3	2–1	3–1	2–0	2–1	2–1	1–2	4–1	1–2	1–1	0–0	4–1	0–0	1–1	2–0	3–0		1–0	2–0	1–0	0–0	4–1
Port Vale	1–2	1–0	2–0	1–2	3–1	2–1	2–2	1–0	1–2	0–1	0–1	1–1	1–2	1–0	4–0	0–4	0–0	0–0	0–1		2–2	0–3	2–3	1–1
Stevenage	3–2	4–1	0–2	0–0	4–1	5–1	0–1	1–1	1–1	2–2	3–1	1–2	3–1	1–2	1–1	1–1	2–1	3–3	1–1	2–0		0–1	0–0	4–1
Swindon Town	3–0	1–4	2–0	0–0	0–3	2–2	2–3	1–2	0–3	4–3	1–1	1–0	0–1	0–1	0–5	1–0	1–1	0–1	1–0	3–2	3–2		1–0	2–2
Wycombe Wanderers	0–4	3–1	1–1	4–3	3–3	1–0	3–1	0–1	4–0	3–2	0–0	3–1	2–1	2–2	1–2	1–2	2–4	2–0	2–4	0–0	1–0	3–2		2–1
Yeovil Town	3–2	2–0	2–0	0–1	0–0	1–2	0–1	2–0	1–2	2–0	3–1	0–0	3–0	0–2	0–3	2–3	2–2	0–2	1–1	1–1	3–0	1–2	0–1	

Updated to match(es) played on 5 May 2018. Source: BBC Sport
Legend: Blue = home team win; Yellow = draw; Red = away team win.

== Managerial changes ==
Team	Outgoing manager	Manner of departure	Date of vacancy	Position in table at time of departure	Incoming manager	Date of appointment	Position in table at time of appointment
Port Vale	(Portugal) Bruno Ribeiro	Resigned	26 December 2016	2016–17 season	(England) Michael Brown	3 May 2017	Pre-season
Newport County	(England) Graham Westley	Sacked	9 March 2017	2016–17 season	(Wales) Michael Flynn	9 May 2017	Pre-season
Norwich City	(Scotland) Alex Neil	Sacked	10 March 2017	2016–17 season	(Germany) Daniel Farke	25 May 2017	Pre-season
Wigan Athletic	(England) Warren Joyce	Sacked	13 March 2017	2016–17 season	(England) Paul Cook	31 May 2017	Pre-season
Middlesbrough	(Spain) Aitor Karanka	Sacked	16 March 2017	2016–17 Premier League season	(England) Garry Monk	9 June 2017	Pre-season
Barnet	(England) Kevin Nugent	Sacked	15 April 2017	2016–17 season	(England) Rossi Eames	19 May 2017	Pre-season
Crawley Town	(Republic of Ireland) Dermot Drummy	Sacked	4 May 2017	Pre-season	(Australia) Harry Kewell	22 May 2017	Pre-season
Swindon Town	(England) Luke Williams	Mutual Consent	5 May 2017	Pre-season	(England) David Flitcroft	5 June 2017	Pre-season
Sunderland	(Scotland) David Moyes	Resigned	22 May 2017	Pre-season	(England) Simon Grayson	29 June 2017	Pre-season
Leeds United	(England) Garry Monk	Resigned	25 May 2017	Pre-season	(Spain) Thomas Christiansen	15 June 2017	Pre-season
Hull City	(Portugal) Marco Silva	Resigned	25 May 2017	Pre-season	(Russia) Leonid Slutsky	9 June 2017	Pre-season
Wolverhampton Wanderers	(Scotland) Paul Lambert	Resigned	30 May 2017	Pre-season	(Portugal) Nuno Espírito Santo	31 May 2017	Pre-season
Portsmouth	(England) Paul Cook	Signed by Wigan Athletic	31 May 2017	Pre-season	(Wales) Kenny Jackett	2 June 2017	Pre-season
Oxford United	(England) Michael Appleton	Appointed Leicester City Assistant Manager	20 June 2017	Pre-season	(Spain) Pep Clotet	1 July 2017	Pre-season
Preston North End	(England) Simon Grayson	Signed by Sunderland	29 June 2017	Pre-season	(Scotland) Alex Neil	4 July 2017	Pre-season
Northampton Town	(England) Justin Edinburgh	Sacked	31 August 2017	24th	(Netherlands) Jimmy Floyd Hasselbaink	4 September 2017	24th
Birmingham City	(England) Harry Redknapp	Sacked	16 September 2017	22nd	(England) Steve Cotterill	29 September 2017	22nd
Port Vale	(England) Michael Brown	Sacked	16 September 2017	24th	(England) Neil Aspin	4 October 2017	23rd
Chesterfield	(Scotland) Gary Caldwell	Sacked	16 September 2017	23rd	(England) Jack Lester	29 September 2017	23rd
Oldham Athletic	(Republic of Ireland) John Sheridan	Mutual consent	25 September 2017	24th	(England) Richie Wellens	18 October 2017	19th
Gillingham	(England) Adrian Pennock	Mutual consent	25 September 2017	22nd	(Wales) Steve Lovell	16 November 2017	22nd
Bury	(England) Lee Clark	Sacked	30 October 2017	23rd	(England) Chris Lucketti	22 November 2017	24th
Sunderland	(England) Simon Grayson	Sacked	31 October 2017	22nd	(Wales) Chris Coleman	17 November 2017	24th
Barnet	(England) Rossi Eames	Took over as Head of Development	13 November 2017	23rd	(Scotland) Mark McGhee	14 November 2017	23rd
Hull City	(Russia) Leonid Slutsky	Mutual consent	3 December 2017	20th	(England) Nigel Adkins	7 December 2017	20th
Middlesbrough	(England) Garry Monk	Mutual consent	23 December 2017	9th	(Wales) Tony Pulis	26 December 2017	9th
Sheffield Wednesday	(Portugal) Carlos Carvalhal	Mutual consent	24 December 2017	15th	(Netherlands) Jos Luhukay	5 January 2018	16th
Nottingham Forest	(England) Mark Warburton	Sacked	31 December 2017	14th	(Spain) Aitor Karanka	8 January 2018	14th
Bury	(England) Chris Lucketti	Sacked	15 January 2018	24th	(England) Ryan Lowe	15 January 2018	24th
Barnet	(Scotland) Mark McGhee	Appointed as Head of Technical	15 January 2018	24th	(England) Graham Westley	15 January 2018	24th
Southend United	(England) Phil Brown	Resigned	17 January 2018	18th	(England) Chris Powell	23 January 2018	20th
Milton Keynes Dons	(Scotland) Robbie Neilson	Mutual consent	20 January 2018	21st	(England) Dan Micciche	23 January 2018	21st
Oxford United	(Spain) Pep Clotet	Sacked	22 January 2018	10th	(England) Karl Robinson	22 March 2018	16th
Leeds United	(Spain) Thomas Christiansen	Sacked	4 February 2018	10th	(England) Paul Heckingbottom	6 February 2018	10th
Bradford City	(Scotland) Stuart McCall	Sacked	5 February 2018	6th	(England) Simon Grayson	11 February 2018	6th
Barnsley	(England) Paul Heckingbottom	Signed by Leeds United	6 February 2018	21st	(Portugal) José Morais	16 February 2018	22nd
Cambridge United	(England) Shaun Derry	Mutual consent	9 February 2018	14th	(Republic of Ireland) Joe Dunne	2 May 2018	13th
Grimsby Town	(England) Russell Slade	Sacked	11 February 2018	17th	(England) Michael Jolley	2 March 2018	20th
Fleetwood Town	(Germany) Uwe Rösler	Sacked	16 February 2018	20th	(Republic of Ireland) John Sheridan	22 February 2017	21st
Peterborough United	(Northern Ireland) Grant McCann	Sacked	25 February 2018	10th	(Scotland) Steve Evans	28 February 2018	8th
Mansfield Town	(Scotland) Steve Evans	Signed by Peterborough United	27 February 2018	5th	David Flitcroft	1 March 2018	5th
Swindon Town	David Flitcroft	Signed by Mansfield Town	1 March 2018	7th	(England) Phil Brown	12 March 2018	9th
Birmingham City	(England) Steve Cotterill	Sacked	3 March 2018	22nd	(England) Garry Monk	4 March 2018	22nd
Walsall	(England) Jon Whitney	Sacked	12 March 2018	14th	(England) Dean Keates	16 March 2018	15th
Stevenage	(England) Darren Sarll	Sacked	18 March 2018	16th	(Tunisia) Dino Maamria	20 March 2018	16th
Barnet	(England) Graham Westley	Sacked	19 March 2018	24th	(England) Martin Allen	19 March 2018	24th
Reading	(Netherlands) Jaap Stam	Sacked	21 March 2018	18th	(England) Paul Clement	23 March 2018	20th
Charlton Athletic	(England) Karl Robinson	Signed by Oxford United	22 March 2018	9th	(England) Lee Bowyer	6 September 2018	2018–19 season
Scunthorpe United	(Scotland) Graham Alexander	Sacked	24 March 2016	5th	(England) Nick Daws	25 May 2018	2018–19 season
Northampton Town	(Netherlands) Jimmy Floyd Hasselbaink	Sacked	2 April 2018	23rd	(England) Dean Austin	12 May 2018	2018–19 season
Ipswich Town	(Republic of Ireland) Mick McCarthy	Resigned	10 April 2018	12th	(England) Paul Hurst	30 May 2018	2018–19 season
