= 2020–21 English Football League =

122nd season of the English Football League

English Football League
- Season: 2020–21
- Champions: Norwich City
- Promoted: Watford; Brentford
- Relegated: Southend United; Grimsby Town
- New clubs in league: Barrow; Harrogate Town

The 2020–21 season was the 122nd season of the English Football League (EFL) and the fifth season under that name after it was renamed from The Football League in 2016. For the eighth season running, the league was sponsored by Sky Betting & Gaming and therefore known as the Sky Bet EFL.

The EFL is contested through three divisions: the Championship, League One and League Two. The winner and the runner-up of the Championship were automatically promoted to the Premier League and they were joined by the winner of the Championship play-off. The bottom two teams in League Two were relegated to the National League.

This season marked the extension by another two years of the league's partnership with official charity Mind. The mental health charity had its logo displayed on the shirts of all EFL clubs and worked with the EFL to promote mental health within football and the wider community.

== Promotion and relegation ==
=== From the Premier League ===
Relegated to the Championship

- Bournemouth
- Watford
- Norwich City

=== From the Championship ===
Promoted to the Premier League

- Leeds United
- West Bromwich Albion
- Fulham

Relegated to League One

- Charlton Athletic
- Wigan Athletic
- Hull City

=== From League One ===
Promoted to the Championship

- Coventry City
- Rotherham United
- Wycombe Wanderers

Relegated to League Two

- Tranmere Rovers
- Southend United
- Bolton Wanderers

=== From League Two ===
Promoted to League One

- Swindon Town
- Crewe Alexandra
- Plymouth Argyle
- Northampton Town

Relegated to the National League

- Macclesfield Town

=== From the National League ===
Promoted to League Two

- Barrow
- Harrogate Town

== Championship ==
=== Table ===
Pos	Team	Pld	W	D	L	GF	GA	GD	Pts	Promotion, qualification or relegation
1	Norwich City (C, P)	46	29	10	7	75	36	+39	97	Promotion to the Premier League
2	Watford (P)	46	27	10	9	63	30	+33	91	Promotion to the Premier League
3	Brentford (O, P)	46	24	15	7	79	42	+37	87	Qualification for Championship play-offs
4	Swansea City	46	23	11	12	56	39	+17	80	Qualification for Championship play-offs
5	Barnsley	46	23	9	14	58	50	+8	78	Qualification for Championship play-offs
6	Bournemouth	46	22	11	13	73	46	+27	77	Qualification for Championship play-offs
7	Reading	46	19	13	14	62	54	+8	70	
8	Cardiff City	46	18	14	14	66	49	+17	68	
9	Queens Park Rangers	46	19	11	16	57	55	+2	68	
10	Middlesbrough	46	18	10	18	55	53	+2	64	
11	Millwall	46	15	17	14	47	52	−5	62	
12	Luton Town	46	17	11	18	41	52	−11	62	
13	Preston North End	46	18	7	21	49	56	−7	61	
14	Stoke City	46	15	15	16	50	52	−2	60	
15	Blackburn Rovers	46	15	12	19	65	54	+11	57	
16	Coventry City	46	14	13	19	49	61	−12	55	
17	Nottingham Forest	46	12	16	18	37	45	−8	52	
18	Birmingham City	46	13	13	20	37	61	−24	52	
19	Bristol City	46	15	6	25	46	68	−22	51	
20	Huddersfield Town	46	12	13	21	50	71	−21	49	
21	Derby County	46	11	11	24	36	58	−22	44	
22	Wycombe Wanderers (R)	46	11	10	25	39	69	−30	43	Relegation to EFL League One
23	Rotherham United (R)	46	11	9	26	44	60	−16	42	Relegation to EFL League One
24	Sheffield Wednesday (R)	46	12	11	23	40	61	−21	41 (Note: Sheffield Wednesday received a 12 point deduction for breaching the League's Profitability and Sustainability Rules. This was later reduced to 6 points by an Independent League Arbitration panel.)	Relegation to EFL League One

Source: EFL Official Website
Rules for classification: 1) Points; 2) Goal difference; 3) Number of goals scored; 4) Head-to-head results; 5) Wins; 6) Away goals; 7) Penalty points (sec 9.5); 8) 12-point sending off offences
(C) Champions; (O) Play-off winners; (P) Promoted; (R) Relegated

=== Play-offs ===
Semi-finals
3	Brentford	0	3	3
6	Bournemouth	1	1	2
4	Swansea City	1	1	2
5	Barnsley	0	1	1

Final
3	Brentford	2
4	Swansea City	0

First leg

17 May 2021
18:00

Bournemouth	1–0	Brentford
Danjuma 55'	Report

Dean Court, Boscombe
Attendance: 2,000
Referee: Tim Robinson
17 May 2021
20:15

Barnsley	0–1	Swansea City
	Report	A. Ayew 39'

Oakwell, Barnsley
Attendance: 4,000
Referee: Geoff Eltringham

Second leg

22 May 2021
12:30

Brentford	3–1	Bournemouth
Toney 16' (pen.); Janelt 50'; Forss 81'	Report	Danjuma 5'

Brentford Community Stadium, London
Referee: Jarred Gillett
22 May 2021
17:30

Swansea City	1–1	Barnsley
Grimes 39'		Woodrow 71'

Liberty Stadium, Swansea
Referee: John Brooks

=== Final ===
29 May 2021
15:00 BST

Brentford	2–0	Swansea City
Toney 10' (pen.); Marcondes 20'	Report

Wembley Stadium, London
Attendance: 11,689
Referee: Chris Kavanagh

=== Results ===
Home \ Away	BAR	BIR	BLA	BOU	BRE	BRI	CAR	COV	DER	HUD	LUT	MID	MIL	NOR	NOT	PNE	QPR	REA	ROT	SHW	STO	SWA	WAT	WYC
Barnsley	—	1–0	2–1	0–4	0–1	2–2	2–2	0–0	0–0	2–1	0–1	2–0	2–1	2–2	2–0	2–1	3–0	1–1	1–0	1–2	2–0	0–2	1–0	2–1
Birmingham City	1–2	—	0–2	1–3	1–0	0–3	0–4	1–1	0–4	2–1	0–1	1–4	0–0	1–3	1–1	0–1	2–1	2–1	1–1	0–1	2–0	1–0	0–1	1–2
Blackburn Rovers	2–1	5–2	—	0–2	0–1	0–0	0–0	1–1	2–1	5–2	1–0	0–0	2–1	1–2	0–1	1–2	3–1	2–4	2–1	1–1	1–1	1–1	2–3	5–0
Bournemouth	2–3	3–2	3–2	—	0–1	1–0	1–2	4–1	1–1	5–0	0–1	3–1	1–1	1–0	2–0	2–3	0–0	4–2	1–0	1–2	0–2	3–0	1–0	1–0
Brentford	0–2	0–0	2–2	2–1	—	3–2	1–1	2–0	0–0	3–0	1–0	0–0	0–0	1–1	1–1	2–4	2–1	3–1	1–0	3–0	2–1	1–1	2–0	7–2
Bristol City	0–1	0–1	1–0	1–2	1–3	—	0–2	2–1	1–0	2–1	2–3	0–1	0–2	1–3	0–0	2–0	0–2	0–2	0–2	2–0	0–2	1–1	0–0	2–1
Cardiff City	3–0	3–2	2–2	1–1	2–3	0–1	—	3–1	4–0	3–0	4–0	1–1	1–1	1–2	0–1	4–0	0–1	1–2	1–1	0–2	0–0	0–2	1–2	2–1
Coventry City	2–0	0–0	0–4	1–3	2–0	3–1	1–0	—	1–0	0–0	0–0	1–2	6–1	0–2	1–2	0–1	3–2	3–2	3–1	2–0	0–0	1–1	0–0	0–0
Derby County	0–2	1–2	0–4	1–0	2–2	1–0	1–1	1–1	—	2–0	2–0	2–1	0–1	0–1	1–1	0–1	0–1	0–2	0–1	3–3	0–0	2–0	0–1	1–1
Huddersfield Town	0–1	1–1	2–1	1–2	1–1	1–2	0–0	1–1	1–0	—	1–1	3–2	0–1	0–1	1–0	1–2	2–0	1–2	0–0	2–0	1–1	4–1	2–0	2–3
Luton Town	1–2	1–1	1–1	0–0	0–3	2–1	0–2	2–0	2–1	1–1	—	1–1	1–1	3–1	1–1	3–0	0–2	0–0	0–0	3–2	0–2	0–1	1–0	2–0
Middlesbrough	2–1	0–1	0–1	1–1	1–4	1–3	1–1	2–0	3–0	2–1	1–0	—	3–0	0–1	1–0	2–0	1–2	0–0	0–3	3–1	3–0	2–1	1–1	0–3
Millwall	1–1	2–0	0–2	1–4	1–1	4–1	1–1	1–2	0–1	0–3	2–0	1–0	—	0–0	1–1	2–1	1–1	1–1	1–0	4–1	0–0	0–3	0–0	0–0
Norwich City	1–0	1–0	1–1	1–3	1–0	2–0	2–0	1–1	0–1	7–0	3–0	0–0	0–0	—	2–1	2–2	1–1	4–1	1–0	2–1	4–1	1–0	0–1	2–1
Nottingham Forest	0–0	0–0	1–0	0–0	1–3	1–2	0–2	2–1	1–1	0–2	0–1	1–2	3–1	0–2	—	1–2	3–1	1–1	1–1	2–0	1–1	0–1	0–0	2–0
Preston North End	2–0	1–2	0–3	1–1	0–5	1–0	0–1	2–0	3–0	3–0	0–1	3–0	0–2	1–1	0–1	—	0–0	0–0	1–2	1–0	0–1	0–1	0–1	2–2
Queens Park Rangers	1–3	0–0	1–0	2–1	2–1	1–2	3–2	3–0	0–1	0–1	3–1	1–1	3–2	1–3	2–0	0–2	—	0–1	3–2	4–1	0–0	0–2	1–1	1–0
Reading	2–0	1–2	1–0	3–1	1–3	3–1	1–1	3–0	3–1	2–2	2–1	0–2	1–2	1–2	2–0	0–3	1–1	—	3–0	3–0	0–3	2–2	1–0	1–0
Rotherham United	1–2	0–1	1–1	2–2	0–2	2–0	1–2	0–1	3–0	1–1	0–1	1–2	0–1	1–2	0–1	2–1	3–1	0–1	—	3–0	3–3	1–3	1–4	0–3
Sheffield Wednesday	1–2	0–1	1–0	1–0	1–2	1–1	5–0	1–0	1–0	1–1	0–1	2–1	0–0	1–2	0–0	1–0	1–1	1–1	1–2	—	0–0	0–2	0–0	2–0
Stoke City	2–2	1–1	1–0	0–1	3–2	0–2	1–2	2–3	1–0	4–3	3–0	1–0	1–2	2–3	1–1	0–0	0–2	0–0	1–0	1–0	—	1–2	1–2	2–0
Swansea City	2–0	0–0	2–0	0–0	1–1	1–3	0–1	1–0	2–1	1–2	2–0	2–1	2–1	2–0	1–0	0–1	0–1	0–0	1–0	1–1	2–0	—	2–1	2–2
Watford	1–0	3–0	3–1	1–1	1–1	6–0	0–1	3–2	2–1	2–0	1–0	1–0	1–0	1–0	1–0	4–1	1–2	2–0	2–0	1–0	3–2	2–0	—	2–0
Wycombe Wanderers	1–3	0–0	1–0	1–0	0–0	2–1	2–1	1–2	1–2	0–0	1–3	1–3	1–2	0–2	0–3	1–0	1–1	1–0	0–1	1–0	0–1	0–2	1–1	—

Updated to match(es) played on 8 May 2021. Source: "Championship Results". Sky Sports.
Legend: Blue = home team win; Yellow = draw; Red = away team win.
For upcoming matches, an "a" indicates there is an article about the rivalry between the two participants.

== League One ==
=== Table ===
Pos	Team	Pld	W	D	L	GF	GA	GD	Pts	Promotion, qualification or relegation
1	Hull City (C, P)	46	27	8	11	80	38	+42	89	Promotion to the EFL Championship
2	Peterborough United (P)	46	26	9	11	83	46	+37	87	Promotion to the EFL Championship
3	Blackpool (O, P)	46	23	11	12	60	37	+23	80	Qualification for League One play-offs
4	Sunderland	46	20	17	9	70	42	+28	77	Qualification for League One play-offs
5	Lincoln City	46	22	11	13	69	50	+19	77	Qualification for League One play-offs
6	Oxford United	46	22	8	16	77	56	+21	74	Qualification for League One play-offs
7	Charlton Athletic	46	20	14	12	70	56	+14	74	
8	Portsmouth	46	21	9	16	65	51	+14	72	
9	Ipswich Town	46	19	12	15	46	46	0	69	
10	Gillingham	46	19	10	17	63	60	+3	67	
11	Accrington Stanley	46	18	13	15	63	68	−5	67	
12	Crewe Alexandra	46	18	12	16	56	61	−5	66	
13	Milton Keynes Dons	46	18	11	17	64	62	+2	65	
14	Doncaster Rovers	46	19	7	20	63	67	−4	64	
15	Fleetwood Town	46	16	12	18	49	46	+3	60	
16	Burton Albion	46	15	12	19	61	73	−12	57	
17	Shrewsbury Town	46	13	15	18	50	57	−7	54	
18	Plymouth Argyle	46	14	11	21	53	80	−27	53	
19	AFC Wimbledon	46	12	15	19	54	70	−16	51	
20	Wigan Athletic	46	13	9	24	54	77	−23	48	
21	Rochdale (R)	46	11	14	21	61	78	−17	47	Relegation to EFL League Two
22	Northampton Town (R)	46	11	12	23	41	67	−26	45	Relegation to EFL League Two
23	Swindon Town (R)	46	13	4	29	55	89	−34	43	Relegation to EFL League Two
24	Bristol Rovers (R)	46	10	8	28	40	70	−30	38	Relegation to EFL League Two

Source: EFL Official Website
Rules for classification: 1) Points; 2) Goal difference; 3) Number of goals scored; 4) Head-to-head results; 5) Wins; 6) Away goals; 7) Penalty points (sec 9.5); 8) 12-point sending off offences
(C) Champions; (O) Play-off winners; (P) Promoted; (R) Relegated

=== Play-offs ===
Semi-finals
3	Blackpool	3	3	6
6	Oxford United	0	3	3
4	Sunderland	0	2	2
5	Lincoln City	2	1	3

Final
3	Blackpool	2
5	Lincoln City	1

First leg

18 May 2021
18:00

Oxford United	0–3	Blackpool
	Report	Turton 23'; Simms 26', 74'

Kassam Stadium, Oxford
Attendance: 3,224
Referee: Bobby Madley
19 May 2021
18:00

Lincoln City	2–0	Sunderland
Hopper 51'; Johnson 77'	Report

Sincil Bank, Lincoln
Attendance: 3,145
Referee: Craig Hicks

Second leg

21 May 2021
19:45

Blackpool	3–3	Oxford United
Embleton 11'; Dougall 13'; Yates 54'	Report	Taylor 7'; Atkinson 52'; Shodipo 74'

Bloomfield Road, Blackpool
Attendance: 4,000
Referee: Keith Stroud
22 May 2021
15:00

Sunderland	2–1	Lincoln City
Stewart 13'; Wyke 33'	Report	Hopper 56'

Stadium of Light, Sunderland
Attendance: 10,000
Referee: Michael Salisbury

Final

30 May 2021
15:00 BST

Blackpool	2–1	Lincoln City
Dougall 34', 54'	Report	Turton 1' (o.g.)

Wembley Stadium, London
Attendance: 9,751
Referee: Tony Harrington

=== Results ===
Home \ Away	ACC	WIM	BLA	BRI	BRT	CHA	CRE	DON	FLE	GIL	HUL	IPS	LIN	MKD	NOR	OXF	PET	PLY	POR	ROC	SHR	SUN	SWI	WIG
Accrington Stanley	—	1–5	0–0	6–1	0–0	1–1	1–0	2–1	1–0	0–1	2–0	1–2	0–0	2–1	0–0	1–4	2–0	0–1	3–3	2–1	1–1	0–2	2–1	3–1
AFC Wimbledon	1–2	—	1–0	2–4	0–1	2–2	1–2	2–2	0–1	1–0	0–3	3–0	1–2	0–2	1–0	2–1	2–1	4–4	1–3	3–3	0–1	0–3	4–1	1–1
Blackpool	0–0	1–1	—	1–0	1–1	0–1	1–1	2–0	0–0	4–1	3–2	1–4	2–3	1–0	2–0	0–0	3–1	2–2	1–0	1–0	0–1	1–0	2–0	1–0
Bristol Rovers	4–1	0–0	2–1	—	1–1	0–1	0–1	2–1	1–4	0–2	1–3	0–2	0–1	0–2	2–0	0–2	0–2	3–0	3–1	1–2	2–1	0–1	0–1	1–2
Burton Albion	2–1	1–1	1–2	1–0	—	4–2	1–1	1–3	5–2	1–1	1–0	0–1	0–1	1–2	1–3	1–5	2–1	1–1	2–4	0–1	1–2	0–3	2–1	3–4
Charlton Athletic	0–2	5–2	0–3	3–2	1–2	—	2–2	1–3	3–2	2–3	1–0	0–0	3–1	0–1	2–1	2–0	0–1	2–2	1–3	4–4	1–1	0–0	2–2	1–0
Crewe Alexandra	2–0	1–1	1–1	3–2	0–3	0–2	—	1–0	1–1	0–1	1–2	1–1	0–1	2–0	2–1	0–6	2–0	2–1	0–0	1–1	3–2	2–2	4–2	3–0
Doncaster Rovers	0–1	2–0	3–2	4–1	0–3	0–1	1–2	—	0–1	2–1	3–3	4–1	1–0	1–1	0–0	3–2	1–4	2–1	2–1	1–0	0–1	1–1	2–1	1–4
Fleetwood Town	1–1	0–1	0–1	0–0	2–1	1–1	0–2	3–1	—	1–0	4–1	2–0	0–0	1–1	0–0	2–0	0–1	5–1	0–1	1–0	1–0	1–1	0–2	1–1
Gillingham	0–2	2–1	2–0	2–0	0–1	1–1	4–1	2–2	0–2	—	0–2	3–1	0–3	3–2	2–2	3–1	1–3	1–0	0–2	2–2	0–0	0–2	2–0	1–0
Hull City	3–0	1–0	1–1	2–0	2–0	2–0	1–0	2–1	2–1	1–1	—	0–1	0–0	0–1	3–0	2–0	1–2	1–0	0–2	2–0	0–1	2–2	1–0	3–1
Ipswich Town	2–0	0–0	2–0	2–1	2–1	0–2	1–0	2–1	3–1	1–0	0–3	—	1–1	0–0	0–0	0–0	0–1	1–0	0–2	2–0	2–1	0–1	2–3	2–0
Lincoln City	2–2	0–0	2–2	1–2	5–1	2–0	3–0	0–1	1–2	0–3	1–2	1–0	—	4–0	2–1	2–0	1–1	2–0	1–3	1–2	0–1	0–4	2–2	2–1
Milton Keynes Dons	3–2	1–1	0–1	2–0	1–1	0–1	0–2	1–0	3–1	2–0	1–3	1–1	1–2	—	4–3	1–1	1–1	2–1	1–0	0–3	2–2	2–2	5–0	2–0
Northampton Town	0–1	2–2	0–3	1–1	0–2	0–2	0–1	0–2	1–0	3–1	0–2	3–0	0–4	0–0	—	1–0	0–2	2–0	4–1	0–0	1–0	0–0	2–1	0–1
Oxford United	1–2	2–0	0–2	2–0	4–0	0–0	0–2	3–0	1–0	3–2	1–1	0–0	2–1	3–2	4–0	—	0–0	3–1	0–1	3–1	4–1	0–2	1–2	2–1
Peterborough United	7–0	3–0	1–2	0–0	2–2	2–1	2–0	2–2	2–1	0–1	1–3	2–1	3–3	3–0	3–1	2–0	—	1–0	1–0	4–1	5–1	1–1	3–1	2–1
Plymouth Argyle	2–2	1–0	1–0	2–0	2–0	0–6	1–1	2–1	1–0	1–0	0–3	1–2	4–3	1–0	2–1	2–3	0–3	—	2–2	0–4	1–1	1–3	4–2	0–2
Portsmouth	0–1	4–0	0–1	1–0	1–2	0–2	4–1	0–1	0–0	1–1	0–4	2–1	0–1	2–1	4–0	1–1	2–0	2–2	—	2–1	0–0	0–2	2–0	1–2
Rochdale	3–1	0–1	1–0	1–1	0–2	0–2	3–3	1–2	2–1	1–4	0–3	0–0	0–2	1–4	1–1	3–4	3–3	0–0	0–0	—	0–2	2–2	2–1	3–3
Shrewsbury Town	2–2	1–1	1–0	0–1	1–1	1–1	0–1	0–2	0–2	1–1	1–1	0–0	0–1	4–2	1–2	2–3	2–0	3–0	1–2	1–2	—	2–1	3–3	1–2
Sunderland	3–3	1–1	0–1	1–1	1–1	1–2	1–0	4–1	2–0	2–2	1–1	2–1	1–1	1–2	1–1	3–1	1–0	1–2	1–3	2–0	1–0	—	1–0	0–1
Swindon Town	0–3	0–1	0–2	1–0	4–2	2–2	2–1	1–2	0–1	1–3	2–1	1–2	0–1	1–4	2–1	1–2	0–3	0–2	3–1	3–1	0–1	0–2	—	1–0
Wigan Athletic	4–3	2–3	0–5	0–0	1–1	0–1	2–0	1–0	0–0	2–3	0–5	0–0	1–2	3–0	2–3	1–2	0–1	1–1	0–1	0–5	1–1	2–1	3–4	—

Updated to match(es) played on 9 May 2021. Source: https://www.bbc.co.uk/sport/football/league-one/table
Legend: Blue = home team win; Yellow = draw; Red = away team win.
For upcoming matches, an "a" indicates there is an article about the rivalry between the two participants.

== League Two ==
=== Table ===
Pos	Team	Pld	W	D	L	GF	GA	GD	Pts	Promotion, qualification or relegation
1	Cheltenham Town (C, P)	46	24	10	12	61	39	+22	82	Promotion to the EFL League One
2	Cambridge United (P)	46	24	8	14	73	49	+24	80	Promotion to the EFL League One
3	Bolton Wanderers (P)	46	23	10	13	59	50	+9	79	Promotion to the EFL League One
4	Morecambe (O, P)	46	23	9	14	69	58	+11	78	Qualification for League Two play-offs
5	Newport County	46	20	13	13	57	42	+15	73	Qualification for League Two play-offs
6	Forest Green Rovers	46	20	13	13	59	51	+8	73	Qualification for League Two play-offs
7	Tranmere Rovers	46	20	13	13	55	50	+5	73	Qualification for League Two play-offs
8	Salford City	46	19	14	13	54	34	+20	71	
9	Exeter City	46	18	16	12	71	50	+21	70	
10	Carlisle United	46	18	12	16	60	51	+9	66	
11	Leyton Orient	46	17	10	19	53	55	−2	61	
12	Crawley Town	46	16	13	17	56	62	−6	61	
13	Port Vale	46	17	9	20	57	57	0	60	
14	Stevenage	46	14	18	14	41	41	0	60	
15	Bradford City	46	16	11	19	48	53	−5	59	
16	Mansfield Town	46	13	19	14	57	55	+2	58	
17	Harrogate Town	46	16	9	21	52	61	−9	57	
18	Oldham Athletic	46	15	9	22	72	81	−9	54	
19	Walsall	46	11	20	15	45	53	−8	53	
20	Colchester United	46	11	18	17	44	61	−17	51	
21	Barrow	46	13	11	22	53	59	−6	50	
22	Scunthorpe United	46	13	9	24	41	64	−23	48	
23	Southend United (R)	46	10	15	21	29	58	−29	45	Relegation to National League
24	Grimsby Town (R)	46	10	13	23	37	69	−32	43	Relegation to National League

Updated to match(es) played on 31 May 2021. Source: EFL Official Website
Rules for classification: 1) Points; 2) Goal difference; 3) Number of goals scored; 4) Head-to-head results; 5) Wins; 6) Away goals; 7) Penalty points (sec 9.5); 8) 12-point sending off offences
(C) Champions; (O) Play-off winners; (P) Promoted; (R) Relegated

=== Play-offs ===
Semi-finals
4	Morecambe	2	1	3
7	Tranmere Rovers	1	1	2
5	Newport County	2	3	5
6	Forest Green Rovers	0	4	4

Final
4	Morecambe	1
5	Newport County	0

First leg

18 May 2021
20:15

Newport County	2–0	Forest Green Rovers
Dolan 31'; Lewis Collins 56'	Report

Rodney Parade, Newport
Attendance: 900
Referee: Charles Breakspear
20 May 2021
18:00

Tranmere Rovers	1–2	Morecambe
Clarke 19'	Report	Knight-Percival 15'; McAlinden 45+1'

Prenton Park, Tranmere
Referee: Darren Drysdale

Second leg

23 May 2021
12:30

Morecambe	1–1	Tranmere Rovers
Wildig 9'	Report	Vaughan 53'

Mazuma Stadium, Morecambe
Referee: Thomas Bramall
23 May 2021
18:30

Forest Green Rovers	4–3 (a.e.t.)	Newport County
Adams 7'; Aaron Collins 8'; Cadden 53'; Matt 87'	Report	Ellison 70'; Labadie 77'; Maynard 119'

New Lawn, Nailsworth
Attendance: 1,300
Referee: Martin Coy

Final

31 May 2021
15:00 BST

Morecambe	1–0 (a.e.t.)	Newport County
Mendes Gomes 107' (pen.)	Report

Wembley Stadium, London
Attendance: 9,083
Referee: Bobby Madley

=== Results ===
Home \ Away	BRW	BOL	BRA	CAM	CAR	CHE	COL	CRA	EXE	FOR	GRI	HAR	LEY	MAN	MOR	NEW	OLD	POR	SAL	SCU	SOU	STE	TRA	WAL
Barrow	—	3–3	1–0	0–2	2–2	3–0	1–1	3–2	2–1	2–2	0–1	0–1	1–1	2–0	1–2	2–1	3–4	0–2	0–1	1–0	1–2	1–1	1–1	2–2
Bolton Wanderers	1–0	—	1–0	2–1	1–0	1–1	0–0	0–1	1–2	0–1	0–0	2–1	2–0	1–1	1–1	0–2	1–2	3–6	2–0	2–0	3–0	1–0	0–3	2–1
Bradford City	2–1	1–1	—	1–0	0–1	1–2	0–0	0–2	2–2	4–1	1–0	0–1	1–0	1–0	2–1	0–3	0–0	0–0	0–1	0–0	3–0	2–1	0–1	1–1
Cambridge United	1–1	1–1	0–0	—	3–0	0–1	2–1	3–1	1–4	1–0	3–0	2–1	2–1	0–1	2–1	2–1	1–2	3–1	2–1	0–1	0–0	0–1	0–0	1–0
Carlisle United	1–0	3–3	3–1	1–2	—	1–2	3–2	2–0	1–0	1–2	1–1	1–1	0–1	1–0	3–1	3–2	1–3	0–0	2–1	2–0	2–0	4–0	2–3	0–0
Cheltenham Town	0–2	0–1	0–2	1–1	1–1	—	1–0	2–0	5–3	2–1	1–3	4–1	1–0	0–0	1–2	1–1	2–0	3–2	2–0	1–0	1–0	1–1	4–0	3–0
Colchester United	1–1	2–0	1–2	1–1	2–1	0–0	—	1–1	1–2	1–0	2–1	2–1	2–1	2–2	1–2	0–2	3–3	0–1	1–0	0–1	2–0	3–1	2–2	2–1
Crawley Town	4–2	1–4	1–1	2–1	0–3	1–0	1–0	—	2–0	0–0	1–2	1–3	0–0	1–0	4–0	1–1	1–4	1–3	1–0	1–0	1–1	0–1	4–0	1–1
Exeter City	1–1	1–1	3–2	2–0	1–0	0–1	6–1	2–1	—	1–1	3–2	1–2	4–0	0–0	0–2	0–0	1–2	0–2	1–0	3–1	0–0	3–1	5–0	0–0
Forest Green Rovers	0–2	0–1	2–2	2–0	1–0	0–0	3–0	1–2	0–0	—	1–0	2–1	2–1	1–2	2–2	1–1	4–3	1–1	0–2	3–2	1–3	1–0	2–1	1–1
Grimsby Town	1–0	2–1	1–2	1–2	1–1	1–1	0–0	2–1	1–4	1–2	—	1–2	0–1	1–1	0–3	0–2	0–0	1–0	0–4	1–0	0–0	1–2	0–0	1–1
Harrogate Town	1–0	1–2	2–1	5–4	1–0	0–1	3–0	1–1	0–0	0–1	1–0	—	2–2	1–0	0–1	2–1	0–3	0–2	0–1	2–5	0–1	0–0	0–1	2–2
Leyton Orient	2–0	4–0	1–0	2–4	2–3	0–2	0–0	1–2	1–1	0–1	2–3	3–0	—	2–2	2–0	2–1	2–1	1–1	1–0	1–1	2–0	0–0	1–3	0–0
Mansfield Town	2–4	2–3	1–3	0–3	1–1	3–1	1–1	3–3	1–2	0–0	2–2	0–1	0–2	—	1–0	1–1	4–1	4–0	2–1	3–0	1–1	0–0	0–0	1–1
Morecambe	1–0	0–1	2–0	0–5	3–1	1–0	3–0	3–1	2–2	1–2	3–1	1–0	2–1	1–1	—	1–3	4–3	1–0	2–1	4–1	1–1	1–1	0–1	1–1
Newport County	2–1	1–0	2–1	0–1	0–0	1–0	2–1	2–0	1–1	0–2	1–0	2–1	0–1	2–1	2–1	—	2–4	1–0	0–0	4–0	0–1	0–0	1–0	1–1
Oldham Athletic	0–1	0–2	3–1	2–4	1–1	2–1	5–2	2–3	2–1	0–3	1–2	1–2	0–1	2–3	2–3	3–2	—	1–2	2–1	0–2	0–0	0–1	0–1	2–3
Port Vale	0–2	0–1	2–1	0–1	0–1	2–1	1–1	2–0	1–0	1–1	3–0	0–0	2–3	0–3	1–0	2–1	0–0	—	1–0	0–1	5–1	0–0	3–4	1–3
Salford City	1–0	0–1	3–0	4–1	1–1	0–0	0–0	1–1	2–2	0–0	1–1	2–2	3–0	2–0	2–1	1–1	2–0	1–0	—	1–1	3–0	2–1	2–2	2–0
Scunthorpe United	2–1	0–1	2–0	0–5	1–0	0–2	0–1	0–0	0–2	1–4	3–0	3–1	2–0	2–3	1–1	1–1	1–1	2–0	0–1	—	1–1	0–1	0–0	0–2
Southend United	1–0	0–1	1–3	1–2	0–2	0–2	2–0	0–0	2–2	0–1	3–1	0–4	2–1	0–1	1–2	1–1	1–2	0–2	0–0	1–0	—	0–0	0–2	0–0
Stevenage	2–1	1–2	1–1	1–0	3–1	0–1	0–0	3–3	0–1	3–0	0–0	1–0	0–2	0–1	2–2	0–1	3–0	2–1	0–1	3–1	0–0	—	0–0	1–1
Tranmere Rovers	1–0	2–1	0–1	1–1	1–0	0–3	0–0	0–1	2–1	3–2	5–0	3–2	0–1	1–1	0–1	1–0	2–2	3–1	0–0	2–0	2–0	0–1	—	1–3
Walsall	0–1	2–1	1–2	0–2	0–2	1–2	1–1	1–0	0–0	2–1	1–0	0–0	2–1	1–1	0–2	0–1	1–1	4–3	0–2	1–2	0–1	1–1	1–0	—

Updated to match(es) played on 8 May 2021. Source:
Legend: Blue = home team win; Yellow = draw; Red = away team win.
For upcoming matches, an "a" indicates there is an article about the rivalry between the two participants.

== Managerial changes ==
Team	Outgoing manager	Manner of departure	Date of vacancy	Position in table	Incoming manager	Date of appointment	Position in table
Scunthorpe United	(England) Paul Hurst	Sacked	29 January 2020	2019–20 English Football League	(England) Neil Cox	7 August 2020	Pre-season
Southend United	(England) Sol Campbell	Mutual consent	30 June 2020	2019–20 English Football League	(England) Mark Molesley	13 August 2020	Pre-season
Bristol City	(England) Lee Johnson	Sacked	4 July 2020	2019–20 English Football League	(England) Dean Holden	10 August 2020	Pre-season
Watford	(England) Nigel Pearson	Sacked	19 July 2020	2019–20 Premier League	(Serbia) Vladimir Ivić	15 August 2020	Pre-season
Oldham Athletic	(Tunisia) Dino Maamria	Sacked	31 July 2020	Pre-season	(Australia) Harry Kewell	1 August 2020	Pre-season
Bournemouth	(England) Eddie Howe	Mutual consent	1 August 2020	Pre-season	(England) Jason Tindall	8 August 2020	Pre-season
Wigan Athletic	(England) Paul Cook	Resigned	1 August 2020	Pre-season	(Republic of Ireland) John Sheridan	11 September 2020	Pre-season
Reading	(Wales) Mark Bowen	Appointed Director of Football	29 August 2020	Pre-season	(Serbia) Veljko Paunović	29 August 2020	Pre-season
Barnsley	(Austria) Gerhard Struber	Appointed by New York Red Bulls	6 October 2020	21st	(France) Valérien Ismaël	23 October 2020	21st
Nottingham Forest	(France) Sabri Lamouchi	Sacked	6 October 2020	22nd	(Republic of Ireland) Chris Hughton	6 October 2020	22nd
Salford City	(Scotland) Graham Alexander	Sacked	12 October 2020	5th	(England) Richie Wellens	4 November 2020	10th
Mansfield Town	(Republic of Ireland) Graham Coughlan	Sacked	28 October 2020	22nd	(England) Nigel Clough	6 November 2020	22nd
Tranmere Rovers	(England) Mike Jackson	Sacked	31 October 2020	18th	(England) Keith Hill	21 November 2020	13th
Swindon Town	(England) Richie Wellens	Appointed by Salford City	4 November 2020	20th	(Republic of Ireland) John Sheridan	13 November 2020	20th
Sheffield Wednesday	(England) Garry Monk	Sacked	9 November 2020	23rd	(Wales) Tony Pulis	13 November 2020	23rd
Wigan Athletic	(Republic of Ireland) John Sheridan	Appointed by Swindon Town	13 November 2020	24th	(England) Leam Richardson	21 April 2021	20th
Derby County	(Netherlands) Phillip Cocu	Sacked	14 November 2020	24th	(England) Wayne Rooney	15 January 2021	22nd
Bristol Rovers	(England) Ben Garner	Sacked	14 November 2020	18th	(England) Paul Tisdale	19 November 2020	18th
Shrewsbury Town	(Wales) Sam Ricketts	Sacked	25 November 2020	23rd	(England) Steve Cotterill	27 November 2020	23rd
Sunderland	(England) Phil Parkinson	Sacked	29 November 2020	8th	(England) Lee Johnson	5 December 2020	8th
Bradford City	(Scotland) Stuart McCall	Sacked	13 December 2020	22nd	(England) Mark Trueman (England) Conor Sellars	22 February 2021	13th
Barrow	(England) David Dunn	Sacked	13 December 2020	21st	(England) Michael Jolley	23 December 2020	22nd
Watford	(Serbia) Vladimir Ivić	Sacked	19 December 2020	5th	(Spain) Xisco Munoz	20 December 2020	5th
Grimsby Town	(England) Ian Holloway	Resigned	23 December 2020	20th	(England) Paul Hurst	30 December 2020	22nd
Sheffield Wednesday	(Wales) Tony Pulis	Sacked	28 December 2020	23rd	(Jamaica) Darren Moore	1 March 2021	23rd
Burton Albion	(England) Jake Buxton	Sacked	29 December 2020	24th	(Netherlands) Jimmy Floyd Hasselbaink	1 January 2021	24th
Fleetwood Town	(England) Joey Barton	Sacked	4 January 2021	10th	(England) Simon Grayson	31 January 2021	14th
Port Vale	(England) John Askey	Sacked	4 January 2021	17th	(England) Darrell Clarke	15 February 2021	18th
Cardiff City	(England) Neil Harris	Sacked	21 January 2021	15th	(Republic of Ireland) Mick McCarthy	22 January 2021	15th
AFC Wimbledon	(Wales) Glyn Hodges	Mutual consent	30 January 2021	21st	(England) Mark Robinson	17 February 2021	20th
Bournemouth	(England) Jason Tindall	Sacked	3 February 2021	6th	(England) Jonathan Woodgate	21 February 2021	6th
Bristol Rovers	(England) Paul Tisdale	Sacked	10 February 2021	20th	(England) Joey Barton	22 February 2021	19th
Northampton Town	(England) Keith Curle	Sacked	10 February 2021	23rd	(Australia) Jon Brady	8 May 2021	2021–22 English Football League
Walsall	(England) Darrell Clarke	Appointed by Port Vale	15 February 2021	11th	(England) Brian Dutton	15 February 2021	11th
Bristol City	(England) Dean Holden	Sacked	17 February 2021	13th	(England) Nigel Pearson	22 February 2021	15th
Barrow	(England) Michael Jolley	Sacked	21 February 2021	23rd	(England) Mark Cooper	28 May 2021	2021–22 English Football League
Colchester United	(England) Steve Ball	Sacked	23 February 2021	21st	(England) Hayden Mullins	13 May 2021	2021–22 English Football League
Leyton Orient	(England) Ross Embleton	Sacked	27 February 2021	14th	(England) Kenny Jackett	21 May 2021	2021–22 English Football League
Doncaster Rovers	(Jamaica) Darren Moore	Appointed by Sheffield Wednesday	1 March 2021	6th	(England) Richie Wellens	17 May 2021	2021–22 English Football League
Ipswich Town	(Scotland) Paul Lambert	Mutual consent	1 March 2021	8th	(England) Paul Cook	2 March 2021	8th
Oldham Athletic	(Australia) Harry Kewell	Sacked	7 March 2021	16th	(England) Keith Curle	8 March 2021	16th
Portsmouth	(England) Kenny Jackett	Sacked	14 March 2021	7th	(England) Danny Cowley	19 March 2021	7th
Charlton Athletic	(England) Lee Bowyer	Resigned	15 March 2021	8th	(England) Nigel Adkins	18 March 2021	6th
Birmingham City	(Spain) Aitor Karanka	Resigned	16 March 2021	21st	(England) Lee Bowyer	16 March 2021	21st
Preston North End	(Scotland) Alex Neil	Sacked	21 March 2021	16th	(Scotland) Frankie McAvoy	10 May 2021	2021–22 English Football League
Salford City	(England) Richie Wellens	Mutual consent	22 March 2021	9th	(England) Gary Bowyer	23 March 2021	9th
Southend United	(England) Mark Molesley	Sacked	9 April 2021	23rd	(England) Phil Brown	9 April 2021	23rd
Forest Green Rovers	(England) Mark Cooper	Sacked	11 April 2021	6th	(Wales) Rob Edwards	27 May 2021	2021–22 English Football League
Swindon Town	(Republic of Ireland) John Sheridan	Resigned	18 April 2021	23rd	(England) John McGreal	26 May 2021	2021–22 English Football League
Tranmere Rovers	(England) Keith Hill	Sacked	11 May 2021	7th	(Scotland) Micky Mellon	31 May 2021	2021–22 English Football League
