= Leeds United F.C.–Millwall F.C. rivalry =

English football club rivalry

Leeds United v Millwall
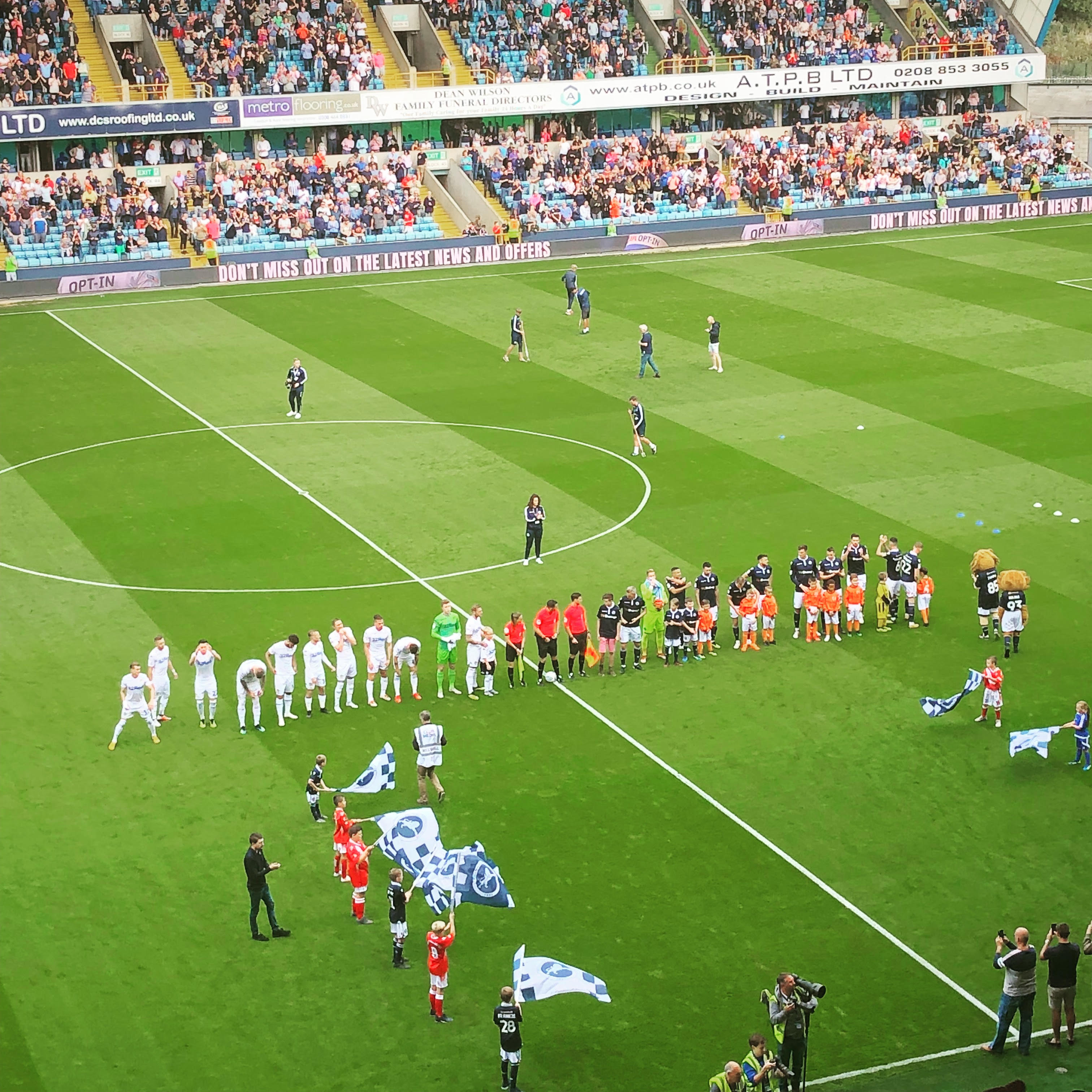
- Millwall v Leeds United at The Den in September 2018
- Location: West Yorkshire and South London
- Teams: Leeds United and Millwall
- First meeting: Leeds United 0–1 Millwall (Division Two, 7 September 1931)
- Latest meeting: Leeds United 2–0 Millwall (Championship, 12 March 2025)
- Stadiums: Elland Road (Leeds); The Den (Millwall)

Statistics
- Total meetings: 45
- Most wins: Tied (20)
- Most player appearances: Alan Dunne (16)
- Top scorer: Tony Cascarino (5)
- All-time series: Leeds United: 20; Millwall: 20; Drawn: 5
- Largest victory: Millwall 0–3 Leeds United (Championship, 17 September 2023)

The rivalry between Leeds United and Millwall is a North–South divide rivalry in English football. Millwall were founded in London in 1885 and Leeds United in Yorkshire in 1919, over 170 miles (270 km) apart. Both sides entered the Football League in 1920–21 season, albeit in different divisions. From 1920 to 2003 the sides met just 12 times; competing in different tiers for the majority of their histories, and neither considering the other a rival on the pitch. From 2004 to 2020, the teams met 28 times when Leeds were relegated from the Premier League. The rivalry began in League One during the 2007–08 season, with disorder and violent clashes between both sets of fans and the police at Elland Road. It continued into the 2008–09 season; where the teams were vying for promotion to the Championship, culminating in Millwall knocking Leeds out of the League One playoffs at the semi-final stage.

The rivalry between the teams is intensified by both clubs' passionate fans and association with football hooliganism. The clubs' two hooligan firms; the Leeds United Service Crew and the Millwall Bushwackers were notorious in the 1970s and 80s for their violence, being called "dirty Leeds" and "the scourge of football" respectively. Leeds and Millwall are two of the most hated clubs in British football, with supporters of other teams still attaching a stigma of trouble to the clubs and their fans. As a result of fighting and disorder between supporters in 2007, kick-off times in future fixtures between the sides were made earlier and matches heavily policed at The Den by the Metropolitan Police and at Elland Road by the West Yorkshire Police. An 'anti-hooligan operation' was introduced by West Yorkshire Police in 2010 for Millwall fans to exchange vouchers for tickets at Woolley Edge service station, severely limiting the number of supporters attending away games at Elland Road. Despite heavier policing measures, there has still been numerous incidents in fixtures; including racial chanting and abuse of players, tragedy chanting from supporters mocking the death of fans, and assault on a player by a fan who entered the field of play.

According to a survey conducted during the 2012–13 season, Leeds fans consider Millwall to be their joint-third biggest rival along with West Yorkshire side Huddersfield Town. Millwall's main rival is fellow London club West Ham United. The clubs have played each other 45 times and are evenly matched. Both teams have won 20, with five games drawn and both sides being dominant at home. As of the 2025–26 season, Leeds play in the Premier League and Millwall play in the Championship. The clubs have competed in different divisions for the best part of their 99 seasons in the Football League, and have spent twenty seasons together in the same tier.

== History of the rivalry ==
=== Founding of the clubs and entering the Football League: 1885–1930 ===
Millwall was formed in 1885 on the Isle of Dogs in the East End of London. They were founding members of the Southern League in 1894; which they competed in for 22 seasons, claiming the title twice. Millwall relocated south of the River Thames to a new stadium in New Cross in 1910. In 1919, Leeds United was formed out of the demise of Leeds City, which was expelled from the Football League for financial irregularities. Based in West Yorkshire; United they played in the Midland League for one season, before both Millwall and Leeds joined the Football League in 1920–21 season. Leeds were elected to the Second Division and Millwall were invited to join the newly created Third Division. Leeds spent their first few years in the Football League yo-yoing between the First and Second Division, they were promoted to the First in 1923–24 and 1927–28 seasons and relegated to the Second Division in 1926–27 and 1930–31 seasons. Millwall spent eight seasons in the Third tier, before being promoted to the Second as Champions in the 1927–28 season.

=== Different leagues (12 meetings in 72 years): 1931–2003 ===
Leeds were relegated from the First to the Second Division in the 1930–31 season, joining Millwall in the same tier for the first time. The clubs met for their first competitive fixture on 7 September 1931, where 9,000 fans saw Millwall win 1–0 at Elland Road with a goal from Jimmy Poxton. Leeds won the return fixture at The Den a week later 3–2. The sides didn't meet again until after World War II in the 1947–48 season. Leeds won 2–1 at Elland Road and the teams drew 1–1 at the Den. It was 37 years before the teams would play another game, with both sides competing in different leagues in the 1950s, 60s and 70s. The teams were both in the Second Division for the 1985–86, 1986–87 and 1987–88 seasons. On 9 November 1985, Millwall won 3–1 at The Den and Leeds won the return match at Elland Road in April 1986 by the same score. Teddy Sheringham scored the only goal in a 1–0 win at The Den for Millwall the following season, and Andy Ritchie and Ian Baird scored the goals in a 2–0 win for Leeds at Elland Road. In the 1987–88 season; Millwall were promoted as Champions to the First Division for the first time in their history and enjoyed their best run of form against Leeds, winning the next four games. On 14 November 1987, Tony Cascarino scored a hat-trick in a 3–1 win at The Den and Terry Hurlock and Cascarino scored the goals a 2–1 win at Elland Road, the first League double in the fixture. The teams also played two games in the Full Members' Cup in 1987 and 1988 at The Den, both 2–0 wins for Millwall. Tony Cascarino scored his fifth goal against Leeds in the 2–0 cup win on 29 November 1988, and in doing so became the record goalscorer in the fixture.

=== Rising hostilities and League One promotion battles: 2004–2010 ===
"There is always a bit of added excitement when we play Leeds United. They are a massive club with a great tradition, and our rivalry dates back to some epic encounters we had with them in League One as we both endeavoured to win promotion to the Championship."

— John Berylson, Millwall chairman (15 November 2012)

Leeds were relegated from the Premier League to the Championship in 2003–04 season, joining Millwall in the same tier for the first time in 16 years. During the 2004–05 season both games were drawn 1–1. The teams had mixed fortunes in the 2005–06 season; Leeds won their first League double in the fixture, winning 2–1 at Elland Road with a brace from David Healy, and 1–0 at The Den, with Ben May scoring a last-minute own goal. They finished the season in a playoff place, while Millwall were relegated to League One. Leeds lost in the 2006 Championship play-off final to Watford and were themselves relegated the following season to League One, the first time Leeds had been in the third tier of the Football League. The rivalry between the fans intensified in League One during the 2007–08 season. On 27 October 2007, fans had to be segregated by police after Millwall fans smashed the windows of buses that were transporting them from Leeds railway station to Elland Road. Leeds fans were waiting for the buses to arrive by the Billy Bremner statue outside the stadium, amid violent clashes mounted police had to charge to keep both sets of fans apart. The game ended in a 4–2 win for Leeds, with David Prutton, Jermaine Beckford, and a Jonathan Douglas brace putting the Whites 4–0 up, before Will Hoskins and Ahmet Brkovic pulled two consolation goals back for the Lions. On 19 April 2008, Leeds completed their second League double over Millwall, with goals from David Prutton and Andy Hughes in a 2–0 win at The Den. This is Leeds best streak in the fixture, winning four in a row and going six games unbeaten. Due to the disorder in the 2007–08 season, kick-off times in future fixtures were made earlier and matches heavily policed at The Den by the Metropolitan Police and at Elland Road by the West Yorkshire Police. Leeds finished the season in fifth and reached the 2008 League One play-off final, losing 1–0 to Doncaster Rovers.

The sides met four times in the 2008–09 season, with both teams vying for promotion to the Championship. On 18 October 2008, Luciano Becchio gave Leeds the lead at the Den, but goals from Dave Martin and a brace from Neil Harris secured a 3–1 win for Millwall. Jermaine Beckford scored both goals in the return fixture in a 2–0 win for Leeds. Both teams finished in the League One play-offs; Leeds in fourth on 84 points and Millwall in fifth place with 82 points, which set up a two-legged semi-final. Millwall won the first leg at the Den 1–0, with a goal from Neil Harris in the 71st minute. In the return leg at Elland Road, a record 37,036 fans saw the biggest game between the two sides. Leeds evened the tie on aggregate at 1–1, with a goal by Luciano Becchio in the 53rd minute. A goal from Jimmy Abdou in the 74th minute won the semi-final for Millwall, sending them to Wembley. The Lions went on to lose the 2009 League One play-off final 2–3 to Scunthorpe United. Both teams were again battling for promotion in the 2009–10 season. Due to trouble in previous seasons, a hugely unpopular 'anti-hooligan operation' was introduced by West Yorkshire Police in 2010 for Millwall fans to exchange vouchers for tickets at Woolley Edge service station on the M1 motorway near Wakefield. The restriction severely affected the atmosphere in the ground; limiting the number of supporters attending away games at Elland Road, from the capacity of 3,000 visiting fans down to just 150.

The Whites were top of the table for most of the first half of the 2009–10 season, and only lost once in their first 24 games. That defeat was a 2–1 loss at the Den, with goals from Neil Harris and Gary Alexander. Leeds manager Simon Grayson said of the October 2009 fixture, “It will be a very intense atmosphere. We know what Millwall are like and the rivalry that exists between the teams." In March 2010, Millwall completed their second League double over Leeds, with Steve Morison and Shaun Batt securing a 2–0 win at Elland Road. It was their first away win in the fixture in 22 years. At the end of the season Leeds finished second in League One on 86 points and were promoted automatically. Millwall finished third on 85 points and were promoted via the play-offs, with a 1–0 win over Swindon Town in the 2010 League One play-off final.

=== Animosity continues into the Championship: 2011– ===
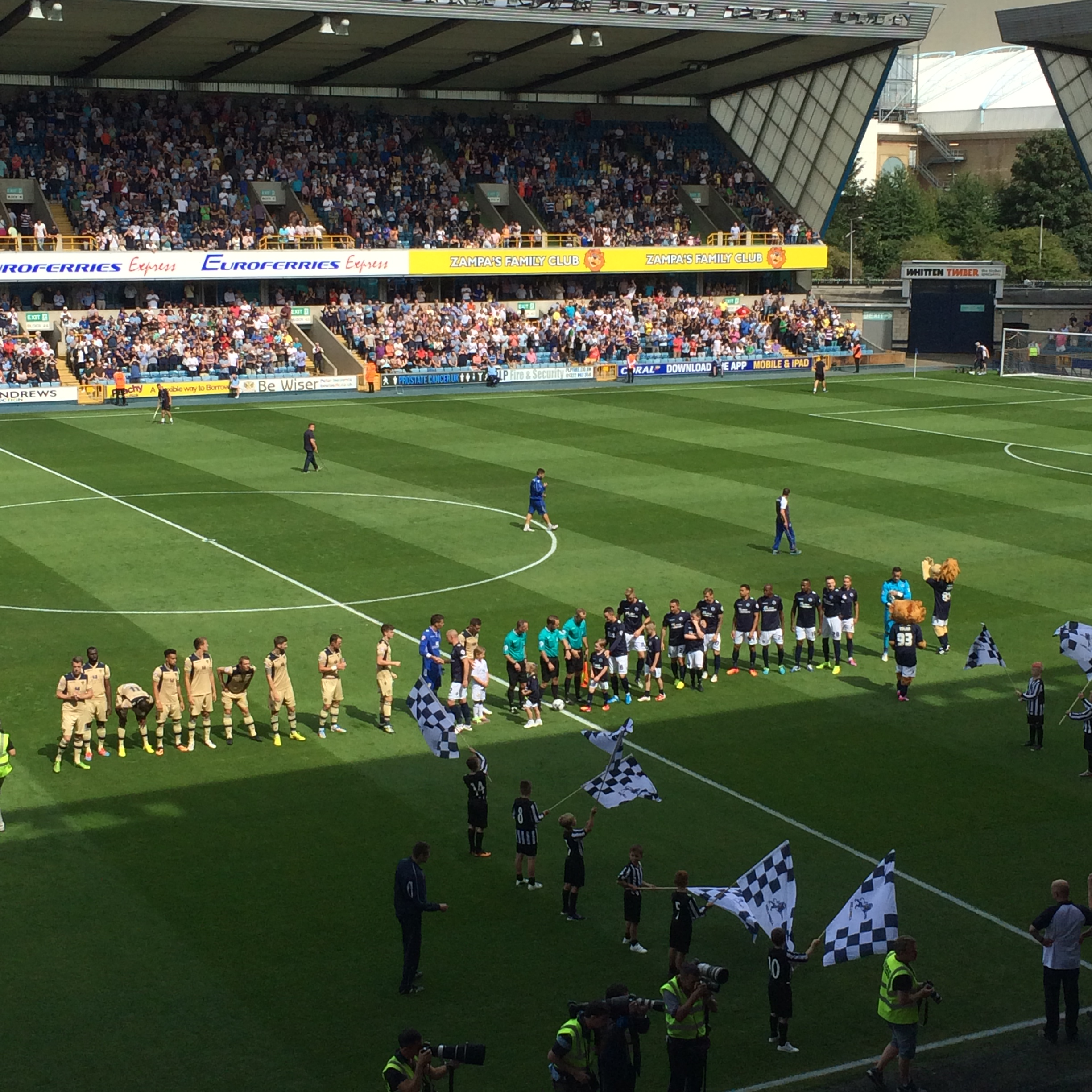
Millwall and Leeds United players shake hands before kick-off at The Den on 9 August 2014

Since both clubs were promoted into the Championship the majority of games in the fixture have been won by the home side. Between the 2010–11 and 2017–18 seasons, Leeds have won five and lost one game at Elland Road. Millwall have also won five games and lost one at the Den. On 21 August 2010, Leeds won 3–1 at Elland Road with a brace from Davide Somma. In the return fixture at the Den in April 2011, four Millwall fans were ejected and banned for waving Turkish flags, mocking the deaths of two Leeds supporters who were murdered in Turkey before a match against Galatasaray in 2000. The game ended in a 3–2 win for Millwall, with James Henry, Liam Trotter, and Steve Morison scoring for the Lions. Leeds completed their third league double over Millwall in the 2011–12 season. Two Robert Snodgrass goals gave the Whites a 2–0 win at Elland Road in December, 2011. A solitary Ross McCormack goal secured the win at the Den in March, 2012. A Chris Wood goal in the 85th minute gave Millwall a 1–0 win at the Den in November, 2012. This began a run of seven successive wins for the home team in the fixture. The game was notable for racial chanting by Millwall fans toward the Leeds player El Hadji Diouf, with one supporter receiving a football banning order of five years. In March 2013, a penalty by Stephen Warnock won the game for Leeds in the return fixture in the 2012–13 season. On 28 September 2013, goals from Martyn Woolford and Scott Malone gave Millwall a 2–0 victory at the Den. Leeds won 2–1 at Elland Road the following March, with Matt Smith and Ross McCormack scoring the goals for the Whites. On the opening day of the 2014–15 season, Millwall supporters goaded Leeds fans with songs about paedophile Jimmy Savile (who was born in Leeds). Millwall manager at the time Ian Holloway called the songs, "obscene and disrespectful to Savile's victims." The Lions won the game 2–0, with a goal from Mark Beevers and a Shaun Williams penalty. Leeds won the return fixture at Elland Road 1–0, with a goal from Alex Mowatt. Millwall finished 22nd in the Championship, and were relegated to League One for the 2015–16 season. The Lions finished in the play-offs, before losing in the 2016 League One play-off final to Barnsley 1–3. In the 2016–17 season, Millwall finished in the play-offs again and returned to Wembley, this time defeating Bradford City 1–0 in the 2017 League One play-off final, gaining promotion to the Championship.

In the 2017–18 season, Millwall rejoined Leeds in the Championship after a two-year absence. The sides met at the Den on 16 September 2017, with Leeds unbeaten and top of the Championship table. An Aiden O'Brien goal won the game for Millwall 1–0, with Leeds conceding their first goal in over ten hours of football. After the win, Millwall manager Neil Harris said, "The fact Millwall versus Leeds is a rivalry based on previous seasons adds to it, of course it does. It builds the atmosphere in the ground, both sets of supporters look forward to it, and a lot is said in the press about it. It is important we give our fans bragging rights." In the return fixture at Elland Road on 20 January 2018; Millwall beat Leeds 4–3, the highest ever scoring game between the sides. In a highly eventful match, Leeds came back from 0–2 and a man down after their captain Liam Cooper was sent-off to lead 3–2, but two late goals in the final two minutes gave Millwall their third league double over Leeds and first away win of the season. The sides played out a 1–1 draw at the Den the following season, with Jed Wallace giving the Lions the lead just after half-time, and a late equaliser by Jack Harrison in the 89th minute sharing the points. Leeds won the return fixture at Elland Road 3–2. Millwall twice took the lead, but a Pablo Hernández double secured all three points for the Whites. In the 2019–20 season, managerless Millwall won 2–1 at home against Leeds, their eighth victory in the last ten games against Leeds at the Den. A penalty from Jed Wallace and a goal from Tom Bradshaw gave Millwall a two-goal lead, before Ezgjan Alioski pulled a goal back for Leeds. Gaetano Berardi was sent off for Leeds, his seventh red card for the club. In January 2020, Leeds came from behind to beat Millwall 3–2 at Elland Road. Millwall took a 2–0 lead in the first 23 minutes, with goals from Shaun Hutchinson and Jed Wallace. After half-time Leeds scored three goals in 15 minutes, with a brace from Patrick Bamford and Pablo Hernández scoring the other goal. At the end of the season, Leeds were promoted to the Premier League as champions and Millwall finished eighth. Leeds spent three seasons in the Premier League, before being relegated back into the Championship.

The rivalry was renewed in the 2023–24 season, Leeds completed their fourth double over Millwall, including a 3–0 win at the Den, the biggest winning margin in the fixture. In the 2024–25 season, Millwall won 1–0 win at the Den on 6 November 2024 with a goal from Japhet Tanganga. The two sides were drawn against each other in the FA Cup for the first time, with Millwall winning the Fourth round tie 2–0 at Elland Road. The game on 8 February 2025 was marred by tragedy chanting, with Millwall supporters mocking the deaths of two Leeds supporters who were murdered in Turkey.

== Notable matches ==
- Leeds United 0–1 Millwall (7 September 1931, Second Division)

The first game between the sides. 9,000 fans at Elland Road saw Millwall win 1–0, with a goal from winger Jimmy Poxton. It was only one of four home defeats in the 1931–32 season for Leeds, who finished runners-up in the Second Division and were promoted. Millwall finished ninth.

- Millwall 1–0 Leeds United (9 May 2009, League One Playoff Semi-final 1st leg)

In the 2008–09 season Leeds finished fourth (on 84 points) and Millwall fifth (82 points) in League One, setting up a two-legged playoff semi-final. Millwall won the first leg at The Den 1–0, with a goal from former Millwall manager Neil Harris in the 71st minute. There was a pitch invasion after the goal, with Leeds goalkeeper Casper Ankergren being involved in an accident with a fan who was arrested on suspicion of assault. The FA launched an investigation into the trouble, with Ankergren saying, "I was pushed in the back by one of the fans that came on the pitch too. It's very bad for football and Millwall should be punished."

- Leeds United 1–1 Millwall (14 May 2009, League One Playoff Semi-final 2nd leg)

37,036 fans at Elland Road saw the most important game between the two sides, the largest ever attendance in the fixture and largest outside of the Premier League in the 2008–09 season. Leeds dominated early possession and were awarded a penalty. Millwall keeper David Forde saved a weak spot-kick by Jermaine Beckford. Leeds pressure eventually paid off, with a goal by Luciano Becchio in the 53rd minute which evened the tie at 1–1. Millwall soaked up more pressure before catching United on the counter-attack, with a goal by defensive midfielder Jimmy Abdou in the 74th minute. Millwall held on to win 2–1 on aggregate. They went on to lose the playoff final 2–3 to Scunthorpe United. The following season; Leeds finished second and were promoted automatically and Millwall finished third and were promoted via the playoffs.

- Leeds United 3–4 Millwall (20 January 2018, The Championship)

The highest scoring game in the fixture. Millwall led at half-time through goals from Aiden O'Brien and Lee Gregory, with Leeds down to ten men after Liam Cooper was sent-off. In the second half Leeds turned the game on its head by scoring three goals in 17 minutes (Kemar Roofe and Pierre-Michel Lasogga with a brace). Millwall finished off a highly eventful topsy-turvy game with an equaliser from Tom Elliott in the 88th minute, and the winner from Jed Wallace two minutes into stoppage-time. This game was Millwall's first away win of the 2017–18 season and third league double over Leeds.

== Results ==
As of 12 March 2025.

=== By competition ===
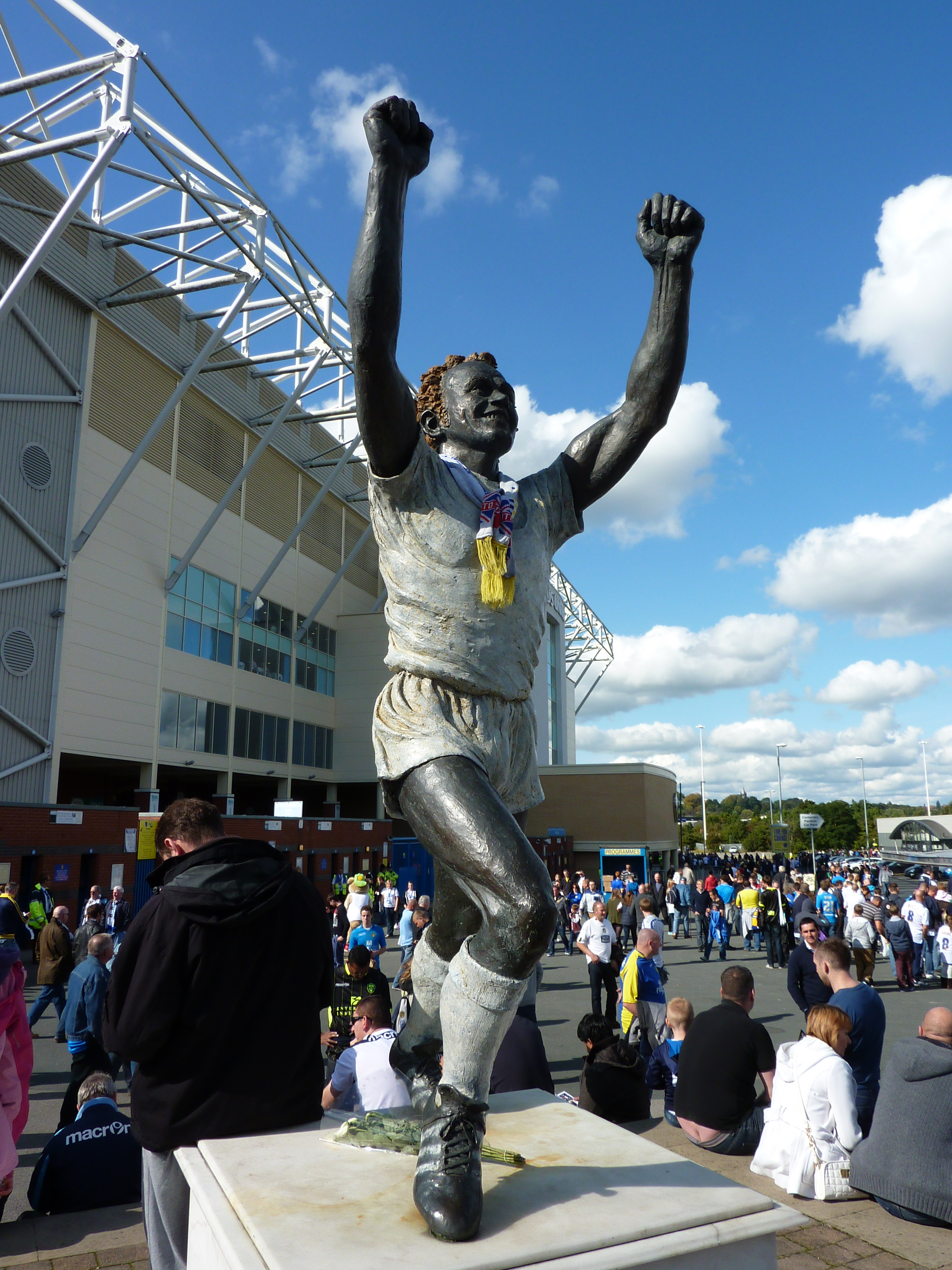
On 27 October 2007, Leeds and Millwall fans clashed with mounted police by the Billy Bremner statue outside Elland Road.

Competition	Played	Leeds wins	Drawn	Millwall wins	Leeds goals	Millwall goals
Football League	40	20	4	16	59	50
FA Cup	1	0	0	1	0	2
Play-offs	2	0	1	1	1	2
Full Members' Cup	2	0	0	2	0	4
Total	45	20	5	20	60	58

This table only includes competitive first-team games, excluding all pre-season games, friendlies, abandoned matches, testimonials and games played during the First and Second World Wars.

=== Full list of results ===
Score lists home team first.

Date	Score	Winner	Competition	Venue	Attendance	Notes
7 September 1931	0–1	Millwall	Second Division	Elland Road	9,000	First ever game between the teams.
14 September 1931	2–3	Leeds United	Second Division	The Den	11,844	
22 November 1947	2–1	Leeds United	Second Division	Elland Road	24,000	
10 April 1948	1–1	Draw	Second Division	The Den	21,426	
9 November 1985	3–1	Millwall	Second Division	The Den	9,758	First game between the sides in 37 years, longest period without meeting.
12 April 1986	3–1	Leeds United	Second Division	Elland Road	15,067	
8 November 1986	1–0	Millwall	Second Division	The Den	6,869	
4 April 1987	2–0	Leeds United	Second Division	Elland Road	18,304	
14 November 1987	3–1	Millwall	Second Division	The Den	8,014	Tony Cascarino hat-trick.
8 December 1987	2–0	Millwall	Full Members' Cup	The Den	5,034	Second round.
6 April 1988	1–2	Millwall	Second Division	Elland Road	24,241	League double (1st for Millwall), first win at Elland Road for 57 years.
29 November 1988	2–0	Millwall	Full Members' Cup	The Den	4,178	Second round, last game between the sides at the Old Den.
19 December 2004	1–1	Draw	Championship	Elland Road	26,265	First game in 16 years.
6 March 2005	1–1	Draw	Championship	The Den	11,510	First game at the New Den between the teams.
7 August 2005	2–1	Leeds United	Championship	Elland Road	20,440	
26 November 2005	0–1	Leeds United	Championship	The Den	8,134	League double (1st for Leeds), Leeds first win at The Den for 74 years.
27 October 2007	4–2	Leeds United	League One	Elland Road	30,319	Violent clashes between both sets of fans and police occur before and after game.
19 April 2008	0–2	Leeds United	League One	The Den	13,395	League double (2nd for Leeds)
18 October 2008	3–1	Millwall	League One	The Den	13,041	
9 February 2009	2–0	Leeds United	League One	Elland Road	19,314	Jermaine Beckford scores his second and third goals against Millwall in the fixture.
9 May 2009	1–0	Millwall	Playoff Semi-final	The Den	13,228	First leg.
14 May 2009	1–1	Draw	Playoff Semi-final	Elland Road	37,036	Second leg. Millwall advanced to the League One Playoff Final winning 2–1 on aggregate.
24 October 2009	2–1	Millwall	League One	The Den	14,165	Former Millwall manager Neil Harris scores his fourth goal against Leeds.
22 March 2010	0–2	Millwall	League One	Elland Road	21,348	League double (2nd for Millwall), first win at Elland Road for 22 years.
21 August 2010	3–1	Leeds United	Championship	Elland Road	25,067	
9 April 2011	3–2	Millwall	Championship	The Den	16,724	Luciano Becchio scores his third goal against Millwall in the defeat.
3 December 2011	2–0	Leeds United	Championship	Elland Road	27,161	
24 March 2012	0–1	Leeds United	Championship	The Den	14,309	League double (3rd for Leeds).
18 November 2012	1–0	Millwall	Championship	The Den	13,117	Future Leeds player Chris Wood scores the 85th-minute winner for Millwall.
2 March 2013	1–0	Leeds United	Championship	Elland Road	19,002	
28 September 2013	2–0	Millwall	Championship	The Den	13,063	
22 March 2014	2–1	Leeds United	Championship	Elland Road	23,211	
9 August 2014	2–0	Millwall	Championship	The Den	16,205	
14 February 2015	1–0	Leeds United	Championship	Elland Road	24,000	Alan Dunne makes his 16th and last appearance in the fixture, a record.
16 September 2017	1–0	Millwall	Championship	The Den	16,447	Seventh game in a row won by the home team.
20 January 2018	3–4	Millwall	Championship	Elland Road	33,564	League double (3rd for Millwall). Highest ever scoring game in the fixture.
15 September 2018	1–1	Draw	Championship	The Den	17,195	First draw in fifteen games.
30 March 2019	3–2	Leeds United	Championship	Elland Road	34,910	
5 October 2019	2–1	Millwall	Championship	The Den	16,311	Jed Wallace scored his third goal against Leeds for Millwall.
28 January 2020	3–2	Leeds United	Championship	Elland Road	34,006	Leeds came from 2–0 down at half-time. In the last three games at Elland Road there have been 17 goals.
17 September 2023	0–3	Leeds United	Championship	The Den	17,909	Largest victory in the fixture.
17 March 2024	2–0	Leeds United	Championship	Elland Road	34,813	League double (4th for Leeds).
6 November 2024	1–0	Millwall	Championship	The Den	16,693	
8 February 2025	0–2	Millwall	FA Cup	Elland Road	34,923	Fourth round.
12 March 2025	2–0	Leeds United	Championship	Elland Road	34,401	

== Statistics ==
As of 12 March 2025.

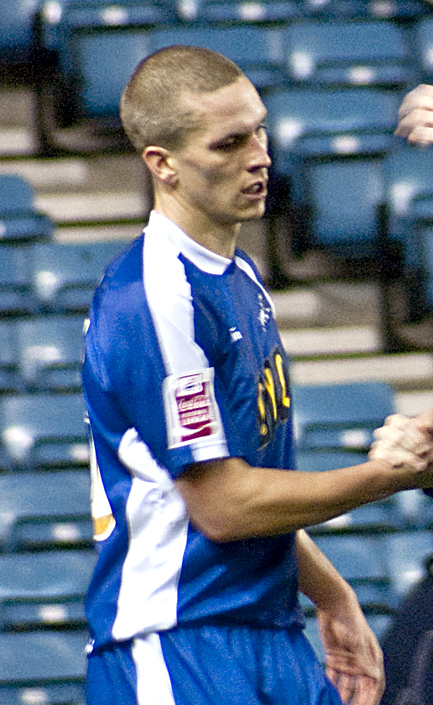
Steve Morison has played for both clubs, scoring 92 goals for Millwall and 5 for Leeds.

=== Firsts ===
- First ever meeting: Leeds United 0–1 Millwall (Second Division), 7 September 1931
- First away victory for Leeds United: Millwall 2–3 Leeds United (Second Division), 14 September 1931

=== Results ===
- Highest scoring game: 7 goals
  - Leeds United 3–4 Millwall (Championship), 20 January 2018
- Largest winning margin (Leeds United): 3 goals (One time)
- Largest winning margin (Millwall): 2 goals (nine times)
- League doubles: 7
  - Leeds United (2005–06, 2007–08, 2011–12 and 2023–24)
  - Millwall (1987–88, 2009–10, and 2017–18)

=== Trends ===
- Most consecutive wins (Leeds United): 4, 7 August 2005 – 19 April 2008
- Most consecutive wins (Millwall): 4, 14 November 1987 – 29 November 1988
- Longest undefeated run (Leeds United): 6 (four wins, two draws), 19 December 2004 – 19 April 2008
- Longest undefeated run (Millwall): 6 (four wins, two draws), 14 November 1987 – 6 March 2005
- Home form:
  - Leeds United (Won 14, drawn 2 and lost 5)
  - Millwall (Won 14, drawn 3 and lost 5)
- Away form:
  - Leeds United (Won 5, drawn 3 and lost 14)
  - Millwall (Won 5, drawn 2 and lost 14)
- Most consecutive draws: 2, 19 December 2004 – 6 March 2005
- Most consecutive games without a draw: 14, 24 October 2009 – 20 January 2018
- Most games played against each other in a season: 3 (1987–88 season)
- Longest period without playing each other: 37 years, 6 months, 30 days. 10 April 1948 – 9 November 1985
- Record highest attendance: 37,036. 14 May 2009, Elland Road. Leeds United 1 Millwall 1
- Record lowest attendance: 4,178. 29 November 1988, The Den. Millwall 2 Leeds United 0
- Average Leeds home attendance: 24,013 (over 18 games)
- Average Millwall home attendance: 12,569 (over 21 games)
- Most player appearances: Alan Dunne (16), Millwall. He made his first appearance coming on as a substitute in the 69th minute at Elland Road in a 1–1 draw on 19 December 2004, and his last in a 1–0 defeat at Elland Road on 14 February 2015.
- Record goal scorer: Tony Cascarino (5), Millwall. Scored a hat-trick on 14 November 1987, one goal on 6 April 1988 and his last on 29 November 1988.

=== League One finishing positions ===
The clubs' last two seasons together in League One were very evenly matched, and the rivalry intensified with both teams pushing for promotion. This table shows their finishing positions.

Pos	2008–09 season	Pld	W	D	L	GF	GA	GD	Pts
4	Leeds United	46	26	6	14	77	49	+28	84
5	Millwall	46	25	7	14	63	53	+10	82
Pos	2009–10 season	Pld	W	D	L	GF	GA	GD	Pts
2	Leeds United (P)	46	25	11	10	77	44	+33	86
3	Millwall (PO)	46	24	13	9	76	44	+32	85

(P) = Promoted; (PO) = Promoted (play-off winner)

== Crossing the divide ==
=== Managers and coaches ===
Dennis Wise was player-manager at Millwall from 2003 to 2005, where he led them to the FA Cup final and European football for the first time in their history. He took charge of Leeds in 2006 but couldn't stop them being relegated to the third tier of English football for the first time in their history. Wise resigned in January 2008 with Leeds eighth in the League, to take up a role at Newcastle United.

=== Players ===
Players who have played for both teams.

- (Argentina) Federico Bessone
- (England) Paul Connolly
- (England) Charlie Cresswell
- (England) Shaun Derry
- (England) Dan Harding
- (South Africa) Chad Harpur
- (England) Darren Huckerby
- (England) Rob Hulse
- (Republic of the Congo) Trésor Kandol
- (Republic of Ireland) Andy Keogh
- (England) David Livermore
- (Australia) Shane Lowry
- (England) Dave Mangnall
- (England) David Martin
- (Republic of Ireland) Stephen McPhail
- (Wales) Steve Morison
- (England) Jamie Shackleton
- (England) Adam Smith
- (England) Richard Naylor
- (England) Henry O'Grady
- (England) Matt Smith
- (Republic of Ireland) Graham Stack
- (Scotland) Peter Sweeney
- (Northern Ireland) Maik Taylor
- (England) Michael Tonge
- (England) Andros Townsend
- (Trinidad and Tobago) Tony Warner
- (England) Byron Webster
- (England) Noel Whelan
- (New Zealand) Chris Wood
- (England) Jermaine Wright

== See also ==
- List of sports rivalries in the United Kingdom
- Leeds United F.C.–Manchester United F.C. rivalry
- Millwall F.C.–West Ham United F.C. rivalry
- South London derby
- West Yorkshire derby
