= 2008–09 Football League =

110th season of the Football League

The Football League
- Season: 2008–09
- Champions: Wolverhampton Wanderers
- Promoted: Wolverhampton Wanderers; Birmingham City; Burnley
- Relegated: Chester City; Luton Town
- New clubs in league: Aldershot Town; Exeter City

The 2008–09 Football League (known as the Coca-Cola Football League for sponsorship reasons) was the 110th completed season of the Football League. It began in August 2008 and concluded in May 2009, with the promotion play-off finals.

The Football League is contested through three Divisions: the Championship, League One and League Two. The winner and the runner-up of the League Championship are automatically promoted to the Premier League and they are joined by the winner of the Championship play-off. The bottom two teams in League Two are relegated to the Conference Premier.

== Promotion and relegation ==
As a consequence of results in the 2008–09 English football season, the following promotions and relegations involving teams within, or entering or exiting the Football League occurred. These changes take effect for the 2009–10 season.

=== From Premier League ===
Relegated to Championship

- West Bromwich Albion
- Middlesbrough
- Newcastle United

=== From Championship ===
Promoted to Premier League

- Wolverhampton Wanderers
- Birmingham City
- Burnley

Relegated to League One

- Norwich City
- Southampton
- Charlton Athletic

=== From Football League One ===
Promoted to Championship

- Leicester City
- Peterborough United
- Scunthorpe United

Relegated to League Two

- Northampton Town
- Crewe Alexandra
- Cheltenham Town
- Hereford United

=== From Football League Two ===
Promoted to League One

- Brentford
- Exeter City
- Wycombe Wanderers
- Gillingham

Relegated to Conference Premier

- Chester City
- Luton Town

=== From Conference Premier ===
Promoted to League Two

- Burton Albion
- Torquay United

== Championship ==
=== Table ===
Pos	Team	Pld	W	D	L	GF	GA	GD	Pts	Promotion, qualification or relegation
1	Wolverhampton Wanderers (C, P)	46	27	9	10	80	52	+28	90	Promotion to the Premier League
2	Birmingham City (P)	46	23	14	9	54	37	+17	83	Promotion to the Premier League
3	Sheffield United	46	22	14	10	64	39	+25	80	Qualification for Championship play-offs
4	Reading	46	21	14	11	72	40	+32	77	Qualification for Championship play-offs
5	Burnley (O, P)	46	21	13	12	72	60	+12	76	Qualification for Championship play-offs
6	Preston North End	46	21	11	14	66	54	+12	74	Qualification for Championship play-offs
7	Cardiff City	46	19	17	10	65	53	+12	74	
8	Swansea City	46	16	20	10	63	50	+13	68	
9	Ipswich Town	46	17	15	14	62	53	+9	66	
10	Bristol City	46	15	16	15	54	54	0	61	
11	Queens Park Rangers	46	15	16	15	42	44	−2	61	
12	Sheffield Wednesday	46	16	13	17	51	58	−7	61	
13	Watford	46	16	10	20	68	72	−4	58	
14	Doncaster Rovers	46	17	7	22	42	53	−11	58	
15	Crystal Palace	46	15	12	19	52	55	−3	56 (Note: Crystal Palace were give a one-point deduction for using an ineligible player during a match against Sheffield United on 3 May 2009.)	
16	Blackpool	46	13	17	16	47	58	−11	56	
17	Coventry City	46	13	15	18	47	58	−11	54	
18	Derby County	46	14	12	20	55	67	−12	54	
19	Nottingham Forest	46	13	14	19	50	65	−15	53	
20	Barnsley	46	13	13	20	45	58	−13	52	
21	Plymouth Argyle	46	13	12	21	44	57	−13	51	
22	Norwich City (R)	46	12	10	24	57	70	−13	46	Relegation to Football League One
23	Southampton (R)	46	10	15	21	46	69	−23	45 (Note: Southampton were given a ten-point deduction for breaching insolvency regulations, regarding their holding company. As they finished in the bottom three in the 2008–09 season, the points deduction was applied during the 2009–10 season in League One.)	Relegation to Football League One
24	Charlton Athletic (R)	46	8	15	23	52	74	−22	39	Relegation to Football League One

Updated to match(es) played on 3 May 2009. Source: The Football League
Rules for classification: 1) points; 2) goal difference; 3) number of goals scored.
(C) Champions; (O) Play-off winners; (P) Promoted; (R) Relegated

=== Play-offs ===
Semi-finals
3	Sheffield United	1	1	2
6	Preston North End	1	0	1
4	Reading	0	0	0
5	Burnley	1	2	3

Final
3	Sheffield United	0
5	Burnley	1

=== Results ===
Home \ Away	BAR	BIR	BLP	BRI	BUR	CAR	CHA	COV	CRY	DER	DON	IPS	NWC	NOT	PLY	PNE	QPR	REA	SHU	SHW	SOU	SWA	WAT	WOL
Barnsley		1–1	0–1	0–0	3–2	0–1	0–0	1–2	3–1	2–0	4–1	1–2	0–0	1–1	2–0	1–1	2–1	0–1	1–2	2–1	0–1	1–3	2–1	1–1
Birmingham City	2–0		0–1	1–0	1–1	1–1	3–2	0–1	1–0	1–0	1–0	2–1	1–1	2–0	1–1	1–2	1–0	1–3	1–0	3–1	1–0	0–0	3–2	2–0
Blackpool	1–0	2–0		0–1	0–1	1–1	2–0	1–1	2–2	3–2	2–3	0–1	2–0	1–1	0–1	1–3	0–3	2–2	1–3	0–2	1–1	1–1	0–2	2–2
Bristol City	2–0	1–2	0–0		1–2	1–1	2–1	2–0	1–0	1–1	4–1	1–1	1–0	2–2	2–2	1–1	1–1	1–4	0–0	1–1	2–0	0–0	1–1	2–2
Burnley	1–2	1–1	2–0	4–0		2–2	2–1	1–1	4–2	3–0	0–0	0–3	2–0	5–0	0–0	3–1	1–0	1–0	1–0	2–4	3–2	0–2	3–2	1–0
Cardiff City	3–1	1–2	2–0	0–0	3–1		2–0	2–1	2–1	4–1	3–0	0–3	2–2	2–0	1–0	2–0	0–0	2–2	0–3	2–0	2–1	2–2	2–1	1–2
Charlton Athletic	1–3	0–0	2–2	0–2	1–1	2–2		1–2	1–0	2–2	1–2	2–1	4–2	0–2	2–0	0–0	2–2	4–2	2–5	1–2	0–0	2–0	2–3	1–3
Coventry City	1–1	1–0	2–1	0–3	1–3	0–2	0–0		0–2	1–1	1–0	2–2	2–0	2–2	0–1	0–0	1–0	0–0	1–2	2–0	4–1	1–1	2–3	2–1
Crystal Palace	3–0	0–0	0–1	4–2	0–0	0–2	1–0	1–1		1–0	2–1	1–4	3–1	1–2	1–2	2–1	0–0	0–0	0–0	1–1	3–0	2–0	0–0	0–1
Derby County	0–0	1–1	4–1	2–1	1–1	1–1	1–0	2–1	1–2		0–1	0–1	3–1	1–1	2–1	2–2	0–2	0–2	2–1	3–0	0–1	2–2	1–0	2–3
Doncaster Rovers	0–1	0–2	0–0	1–0	2–1	1–1	0–1	1–0	2–0	2–1		1–0	1–1	0–0	1–0	0–2	2–0	0–1	0–2	1–0	0–2	0–0	1–2	0–1
Ipswich Town	3–0	0–1	1–1	3–1	1–1	1–2	1–1	2–1	1–1	2–0	1–3		3–2	2–1	0–0	1–2	2–0	2–0	1–1	1–1	0–3	2–2	0–0	0–2
Norwich City	4–0	1–1	1–1	1–2	1–1	2–0	1–0	1–2	1–2	1–2	2–1	2–0		2–3	1–0	2–2	0–1	0–2	1–0	0–1	2–2	2–3	2–0	5–2
Nottingham Forest	1–0	1–1	0–0	3–2	1–2	0–1	0–0	1–0	0–2	1–3	2–4	1–1	1–2		2–0	2–1	2–2	0–0	0–1	2–1	3–1	1–1	3–2	0–1
Plymouth Argyle	1–2	0–1	1–2	0–2	1–2	2–1	2–2	4–0	1–3	0–3	0–3	1–3	1–2	1–0		1–0	1–1	2–2	2–2	4–0	2–0	0–1	2–1	2–2
Preston North End	2–1	1–0	0–1	2–0	2–1	6–0	2–1	2–1	2–0	2–0	1–0	3–2	1–0	2–1	1–1		2–1	2–1	0–0	1–1	2–3	0–2	2–0	1–3
Queens Park Rangers	2–1	1–0	1–1	2–1	1–2	1–0	2–1	1–1	0–0	0–2	2–0	1–3	0–1	2–1	0–0	3–2		0–0	0–0	3–2	4–1	1–0	0–0	1–0
Reading	0–0	1–2	1–0	0–2	3–1	1–1	2–2	3–1	4–2	3–0	2–1	0–1	2–0	0–1	2–0	0–0	0–0		0–1	6–0	1–2	4–0	4–0	1–0
Sheffield United	2–1	2–1	2–2	3–0	2–3	0–0	3–1	1–1	2–2	4–2	0–1	2–0	1–0	0–0	2–0	1–0	3–0	0–2		1–2	0–0	1–0	2–1	1–3
Sheffield Wednesday	0–1	1–1	1–1	0–0	4–1	1–0	4–1	0–1	2–0	0–1	1–0	0–0	3–2	1–0	0–1	1–1	1–0	1–2	1–0		2–0	0–0	2–0	0–1
Southampton	0–0	1–2	0–1	0–1	2–2	1–0	2–3	1–1	1–0	1–1	1–2	2–2	2–0	0–2	0–0	3–1	0–0	1–1	1–2	1–1		2–2	0–3	1–2
Swansea City	2–2	2–3	0–1	1–0	1–1	2–2	1–1	0–0	1–3	1–1	3–1	3–0	2–1	3–1	1–0	4–1	0–0	2–0	1–1	1–1	3–0		3–1	3–1
Watford	1–1	0–1	3–4	2–4	3–0	2–2	1–0	2–1	2–0	3–1	1–1	2–1	2–1	2–1	1–2	2–1	3–0	2–2	0–2	2–2	2–2	2–0		2–3
Wolverhampton Wanderers	2–0	1–1	2–0	2–0	2–0	2–2	2–1	2–1	2–1	3–0	1–0	0–0	3–3	5–1	0–1	1–3	1–0	0–3	1–1	4–1	3–0	2–1	3–1	

Source: The Football League
Legend: Blue = home team win; Yellow = draw; Red = away team win.

=== Managerial changes ===
Team	Outgoing manager	Manner of departure	Date of vacancy	Replaced by	Date of appointment	Position in table
Queens Park Rangers	Iain Dowie	Contract terminated	24 October 2008	Paulo Sousa	19 November 2008	9th
Watford	Aidy Boothroyd	Mutual consent	3 November 2008	Brendan Rodgers	24 November 2008	21st
Charlton Athletic	Alan Pardew	Mutual Consent	22 November 2008	Phil Parkinson	31 December 2008	22nd
Blackpool	Simon Grayson	Signed by Leeds United (Mutual Consent)	23 December 2008	Ian Holloway	21 May 2009	16th
Nottingham Forest	Colin Calderwood	Contract terminated	26 December 2008	Billy Davies	1 January 2009	22nd
Derby County	Paul Jewell	Resigned	28 December 2008	Nigel Clough	6 January 2009	18th
Norwich City	Glenn Roeder	Contract terminated	14 January 2009	Bryan Gunn	21 January 2009	21st
Southampton	Jan Poortvliet	Resigned	23 January 2009	Mark Wotte	23 January 2009	23rd
Queens Park Rangers	Paulo Sousa	Contract terminated	9 April 2009			10th
Ipswich Town	Jim Magilton	Contract terminated	22 April 2009	Roy Keane	23 April 2009	9th
Reading	Steve Coppell	Resigned	13 May 2009			4th

=== Top scorers ===
Pos	Player	Team	Goals
1	(England) Sylvan Ebanks-Blake	Wolverhampton Wanderers	25
2	(Trinidad and Tobago) Jason Scotland	Swansea City	21
2	(Scotland) Ross McCormack	Cardiff City	21
4	(Republic of Ireland) Kevin Doyle	Reading	18
5	(England) Tommy Smith	Watford	17
6	(England) Rob Hulse	Derby County	15
7	(Scotland) Chris Iwelumo	Wolverhampton Wanderers	14
7	(England) Kevin Phillips	Birmingham City	14
7	(England) Marcus Tudgay	Sheffield Wednesday	14
10	(Antigua and Barbuda) Dexter Blackstock	Nottingham Forest	13
10	(England) Nicky Bailey	Charlton Athletic	13
10	(Scotland) Paul Gallagher	Plymouth Argyle	13

== League One ==
=== Table ===
Pos	Team	Pld	W	D	L	GF	GA	GD	Pts	Promotion or relegation
1	Leicester City (C, P)	46	27	15	4	84	39	+45	96	Promotion to Football League Championship
2	Peterborough United (P)	46	26	11	9	78	54	+24	89	Promotion to Football League Championship
3	Milton Keynes Dons	46	26	9	11	83	47	+36	87	Qualification for League One play-offs
4	Leeds United	46	26	6	14	77	49	+28	84	Qualification for League One play-offs
5	Millwall	46	25	7	14	63	53	+10	82	Qualification for League One play-offs
6	Scunthorpe United (O, P)	46	22	10	14	82	63	+19	76	Qualification for League One play-offs
7	Tranmere Rovers	46	21	11	14	62	49	+13	74	
8	Southend United	46	21	8	17	58	61	−3	71	
9	Huddersfield Town	46	18	14	14	62	65	−3	68	
10	Oldham Athletic	46	16	17	13	66	65	+1	65	
11	Bristol Rovers	46	17	12	17	79	61	+18	63	
12	Colchester United	46	18	9	19	58	58	0	63	
13	Walsall	46	17	10	19	61	66	−5	61	
14	Leyton Orient	46	15	11	20	45	57	−12	56	
15	Swindon Town	46	12	17	17	68	71	−3	53	
16	Brighton & Hove Albion	46	13	13	20	55	70	−15	52	
17	Yeovil Town	46	12	15	19	41	66	−25	51	
18	Stockport County	46	16	12	18	59	57	+2	50 (Note: Stockport County deducted 10 points for entering administration.)	
19	Hartlepool United	46	13	11	22	66	79	−13	50	
20	Carlisle United	46	12	14	20	56	69	−13	50	
21	Northampton Town (R)	46	12	13	21	61	65	−4	49	Relegation to Football League Two
22	Crewe Alexandra (R)	46	12	10	24	59	82	−23	46	Relegation to Football League Two
23	Cheltenham Town (R)	46	9	12	25	51	91	−40	39	Relegation to Football League Two
24	Hereford United (R)	46	9	7	30	42	79	−37	34	Relegation to Football League Two

Updated to match(es) played on 2 May 2009. Source: The Football League
Rules for classification: 1) points; 2) goal difference; 3) number of goals scored.
(C) Champions; (O) Play-off winners; (P) Promoted; (R) Relegated

=== Play-offs ===
Semi-finals
6	Scunthorpe United	1	0 (7)	1
3	Milton Keynes Dons	1	0 (6)	1
5	Millwall	1	1	2
4	Leeds United	0	1	1

Final
6	Scunthorpe United	3
5	Millwall	2

=== Results ===
Home \ Away	B&HA	BRR	CRL	CHL	COL	CRE	HAR	HER	HUD	LEE	LEI	LEY	MIL	MKD	NOR	OLD	PET	SCU	STD	STP	SWI	TRA	WAL	YEO
Brighton & Hove Albion		1–1	0–2	3–3	1–2	0–4	2–1	0–0	0–1	0–2	3–2	0–0	4–1	2–4	1–1	3–1	2–4	1–4	1–3	1–0	2–3	0–0	0–1	5–0
Bristol Rovers	1–2		2–3	3–2	0–0	0–0	4–1	6–1	1–2	2–2	0–1	2–1	4–2	1–2	1–0	2–0	0–1	1–2	4–2	2–0	2–2	2–0	1–3	3–0
Carlisle United	3–1	1–1		1–0	0–2	4–2	0–1	1–2	3–0	0–2	1–2	1–3	2–0	3–2	1–1	1–1	3–3	1–1	2–1	1–2	1–1	1–2	1–1	4–1
Cheltenham Town	2–2	2–1	1–1		4–3	1–0	2–0	2–3	1–2	0–1	0–4	0–1	1–3	3–5	0–1	1–1	3–6	1–2	0–0	2–2	2–0	1–0	0–0	1–0
Colchester United	0–1	0–1	5–0	3–1		0–1	1–1	1–2	0–0	0–1	0–1	1–0	1–2	0–3	2–1	2–2	0–1	0–0	0–1	1–0	3–2	0–1	0–2	1–0
Crewe Alexandra	1–2	1–1	1–2	1–2	2–0		0–0	2–1	3–1	2–3	0–3	0–2	0–1	2–2	1–3	0–3	1–1	3–2	3–4	0–3	1–0	2–1	2–1	2–0
Hartlepool United	1–0	1–1	2–2	4–1	4–2	1–4		4–2	5–3	0–1	2–2	0–1	2–3	1–3	2–0	3–3	1–2	2–3	3–0	0–1	3–3	2–1	2–2	0–0
Hereford United	1–2	0–3	1–0	3–0	0–2	2–0	1–1		0–1	2–0	1–3	2–1	0–2	0–1	0–2	5–0	0–1	1–2	0–1	0–1	1–1	2–2	0–0	1–2
Huddersfield Town	2–2	1–1	1–0	2–2	2–2	3–2	1–1	2–0		1–0	2–3	0–1	1–2	1–3	3–2	1–1	1–0	2–0	0–1	1–1	2–1	1–2	2–1	0–0
Leeds United	3–1	2–2	0–2	2–0	1–2	5–2	4–1	1–0	1–2		1–1	2–1	2–0	2–0	3–0	0–2	3–1	3–2	2–0	1–0	1–0	3–1	3–0	4–0
Leicester City	0–0	2–1	2–2	4–0	1–1	2–1	1–0	2–1	4–2	1–0		3–0	0–1	2–0	0–0	0–0	4–0	2–2	3–0	1–1	1–1	3–1	2–2	1–0
Leyton Orient	2–1	1–2	0–0	1–2	2–1	1–0	1–0	2–1	1–1	2–2	1–3		0–0	1–2	1–3	2–1	2–3	2–2	1–1	0–3	1–2	0–1	0–1	0–1
Millwall	0–1	3–2	1–0	2–0	0–1	0–0	2–0	1–0	2–1	3–1	0–1	2–1		0–4	1–0	2–3	2–0	1–2	1–1	1–0	1–1	1–0	3–1	1–1
Milton Keynes Dons	2–0	2–1	3–1	3–1	1–1	2–2	3–1	3–0	1–1	3–1	2–2	1–2	0–1		1–0	6–2	1–2	0–2	2–0	1–2	1–2	1–0	0–1	3–0
Northampton Town	2–2	0–0	1–0	4–2	1–2	5–1	1–0	2–1	1–1	2–1	1–2	1–1	0–0	0–1		0–1	1–1	3–3	2–3	4–0	3–4	1–1	0–2	3–0
Oldham Athletic	1–1	0–2	0–0	4–0	0–1	1–1	2–1	4–0	1–1	1–1	1–1	1–1	4–3	2–0	2–1		1–2	3–0	1–1	3–1	0–0	0–2	3–2	0–2
Peterborough United	0–0	5–4	1–0	1–1	2–1	4–2	1–2	2–0	4–0	2–0	2–0	3–0	1–0	0–0	1–0	2–2		2–1	1–2	1–0	2–2	2–2	1–0	1–3
Scunthorpe United	2–0	0–2	2–1	3–0	3–0	3–0	3–0	3–0	1–2	1–2	1–2	2–1	3–2	0–1	4–4	2–0	1–0		1–1	2–1	3–3	1–1	1–1	2–0
Southend United	0–2	1–0	3–0	2–0	3–3	0–1	3–2	1–0	0–1	1–0	0–2	3–0	0–1	0–2	1–0	1–2	1–0	2–0		1–1	2–1	2–1	2–0	0–1
Stockport County	2–0	3–1	3–0	1–0	1–2	4–3	2–1	4–1	1–1	1–3	0–0	0–1	2–2	0–1	1–1	3–1	1–3	0–3	3–1		1–1	0–0	1–2	0–0
Swindon Town	0–2	2–1	1–1	2–2	1–3	0–0	0–1	3–0	1–3	1–3	2–2	0–1	1–2	1–1	2–1	2–0	2–2	4–2	3–0	1–1		3–1	3–2	2–3
Tranmere Rovers	1–0	2–0	4–1	2–0	3–4	2–0	1–0	2–1	3–1	2–1	2–0	0–0	1–3	1–1	4–1	0–1	1–1	2–0	2–2	2–1	1–0		2–1	1–1
Walsall	3–0	0–5	2–1	1–1	2–0	1–1	2–3	1–1	2–3	1–0	1–4	0–2	1–2	0–3	3–1	1–2	1–2	2–1	5–2	1–0	2–1	0–1		2–0
Yeovil Town	1–1	2–2	1–1	1–1	0–2	3–2	2–3	2–2	1–0	1–1	0–2	0–0	2–0	0–0	1–0	2–2	0–1	1–2	1–2	2–4	1–0	1–0	1–1	

Source: The Football League
Legend: Blue = home team win; Yellow = draw; Red = away team win.

=== Managerial changes ===
Team	Outgoing manager	Manner of departure	Date of vacancy	Replaced by	Date of appointment	Position in table
Milton Keynes Dons	Paul Ince	Signed by Blackburn Rovers (Mutual Consent)	22 June 2008	Roberto Di Matteo	2 July 2008	Pre-season
Cheltenham Town	Keith Downing	Mutual consent	13 September 2008	Martin Allen	15 September 2008	24th
Colchester United	Geraint Williams	Mutual consent	22 September 2008	Paul Lambert	9 October 2008	23rd
Carlisle United	John Ward	Mutual consent	3 November 2008	Greg Abbott	5 December 2008	20th
Huddersfield Town	Stan Ternent	Contract terminated	4 November 2008	Lee Clark	11 December 2008	16th
Swindon Town	Maurice Malpas	Mutual consent	14 November 2008	Danny Wilson	26 December 2008	17th
Crewe Alexandra	Steve Holland		18 November 2008	Guðjón Thórðarson	24 December 2008	24th
Hartlepool United	Danny Wilson	Contract terminated	15 December 2008			13th
Leeds United	Gary McAllister	Contract terminated	21 December 2008	Simon Grayson	23 December 2008	9th
Walsall	Jimmy Mullen	Contract terminated	10 January 2009	Chris Hutchings	20 January 2009	12th
Leyton Orient	Martin Ling	Mutual Consent	18 January 2009	Geraint Williams	5 February 2009	21st
Yeovil Town	Russell Slade	Mutual Consent	16 February 2009	Terry Skiverton	18 February 2009	16th
Brighton & Hove Albion	Micky Adams	Mutual Consent	21 February 2009	Russell Slade	6 March 2009	21st
Oldham Athletic	John Sheridan	Mutual Consent	15 March 2009	Joe Royle	15 March 2009	8th

=== Top scorers ===
Pos	Player	Club	Goals
1	(England) Rickie Lambert	Bristol Rovers	29
1	(Republic of Ireland) Simon Cox	Swindon Town	29
3	(Jamaica) Jermaine Beckford	Leeds United	27
3	(England) Matty Fryatt	Leicester City	27
5	(England) Gary Hooper	Scunthorpe United	24
6	(Scotland) Craig Mackail-Smith	Peterborough United	23
7	(England) Aaron McLean	Peterborough United	18
7	(Australia) Joel Porter	Hartlepool United	18
9	(England) Paul Hayes	Scunthorpe United	17
10	(England) Aaron Wilbraham	Milton Keynes Dons	16

== League Two ==
=== Table ===
Pos	Team	Pld	W	D	L	GF	GA	GD	Pts	Promotion, qualification or relegation
1	Brentford (C, P)	46	23	16	7	65	36	+29	85	Promotion to Football League One
2	Exeter City (P)	46	22	13	11	65	50	+15	79	Promotion to Football League One
3	Wycombe Wanderers (P)	46	20	18	8	54	33	+21	78	Promotion to Football League One
4	Bury	46	21	15	10	63	43	+20	78	Qualification for League Two play-offs
5	Gillingham (O, P)	46	21	12	13	58	55	+3	75	Qualification for League Two play-offs
6	Rochdale	46	19	13	14	70	59	+11	70	Qualification for League Two play-offs
7	Shrewsbury Town	46	17	18	11	61	44	+17	69	Qualification for League Two play-offs
8	Dagenham & Redbridge	46	19	11	16	77	53	+24	68	
9	Bradford City	46	18	13	15	66	55	+11	67	
10	Chesterfield	46	16	15	15	62	57	+5	63	
11	Morecambe	46	15	18	13	53	56	−3	63	
12	Darlington	46	20	12	14	61	44	+17	62 (Note: Darlington deducted 10 points for entering administration.)	
13	Lincoln City	46	14	17	15	53	52	+1	59	
14	Rotherham United	46	21	12	13	60	46	+14	58 (Note: Rotherham United deducted 17 points for leaving administration without a Company Voluntary Agreement.)	
15	Aldershot Town	46	14	12	20	59	80	−21	54	
16	Accrington Stanley	46	13	11	22	42	59	−17	50	
17	Barnet	46	11	15	20	56	74	−18	48	
18	Port Vale	46	13	9	24	44	66	−22	48	
19	Notts County	46	11	14	21	49	69	−20	47	
20	Macclesfield Town	46	13	8	25	45	77	−32	47	
21	Bournemouth	46	17	12	17	59	51	+8	46 (Note: Bournemouth deducted 17 points for leaving administration without a Company Voluntary Agreement.)	
22	Grimsby Town	46	9	14	23	51	69	−18	41	
23	Chester City (R)	46	8	13	25	43	81	−38	37	Relegated to Conference National
24	Luton Town (R)	46	13	17	16	58	65	−7	26 (Note: Luton Town deducted 30 points; 20 points for leaving administration without a Company Voluntary Agreement, and 10 points for making illegal payments to agents.)	Relegated to Conference National

Source: The Football League
Rules for classification: 1) points; 2) goal difference; 3) number of goals scored.
(C) Champions; (O) Play-off winners; (P) Promoted; (R) Relegated

=== Play-offs ===
Semifinals
7	Shrewsbury Town	0	1 (4)	1
4	Bury	1	0 (3)	1
6	Rochdale	0	1	1
5	Gillingham	0	2	2

Final at Wembley
Shrewsbury Town	0
Gillingham	1

=== Results ===
Home \ Away	ACC	ALD	BAR	BOU	BRA	BRE	BRY	CHE	CHF	D&R	DAR	EXE	GIL	GRI	LIN	LUT	MAC	MOR	NTC	PTV	ROC	ROT	SHR	WYC
Accrington Stanley		0–1	1–1	3–0	2–3	1–1	1–2	0–1	1–0	0–0	1–0	2–1	0–2	3–1	0–2	0–0	2–0	1–0	1–1	2–0	1–3	1–3	2–1	0–1
Aldershot Town	3–1		1–1	1–1	3–2	1–1	3–3	2–2	1–1	1–2	2–1	1–0	2–1	2–2	2–0	2–1	1–1	0–2	2–2	1–0	2–4	0–1	0–0	3–2
Barnet	2–1	0–3		1–0	4–1	0–1	1–2	3–1	1–3	1–1	0–1	0–1	2–2	3–3	3–2	1–1	1–3	1–1	0–4	1–2	2–1	2–0	0–0	1–1
Bournemouth	1–0	2–0	0–2		4–1	0–1	2–0	1–0	1–1	2–1	3–1	0–1	1–1	2–1	0–1	1–1	0–1	0–0	0–1	0–0	4–0	0–0	1–0	3–1
Bradford City	1–1	5–0	3–3	1–3		1–1	1–0	0–0	3–2	1–1	0–0	4–1	2–2	2–0	1–1	1–1	1–0	4–0	2–1	0–1	2–0	3–0	0–0	1–0
Brentford	3–0	3–0	1–0	2–0	2–1		1–0	3–0	0–1	2–1	1–1	1–1	1–1	4–0	1–1	2–0	1–0	3–1	1–1	2–0	1–2	0–0	1–1	3–3
Bury	1–0	2–1	1–0	1–0	1–0	1–0		1–1	1–2	2–2	2–2	0–1	4–0	0–2	3–1	1–2	3–0	2–1	2–0	3–0	2–1	1–2	2–1	0–0
Chester City	2–0	0–1	5–1	0–2	0–0	3–0	1–1		1–3	2–2	1–2	0–0	0–1	1–1	0–2	2–2	0–2	1–2	2–0	1–2	0–2	1–5	1–1	0–2
Chesterfield	1–1	5–1	1–1	1–0	0–2	0–1	1–3	1–1		1–1	0–0	2–1	0–1	2–1	1–1	2–2	2–4	1–2	3–1	2–1	3–0	1–0	2–2	0–1
Dagenham & Redbridge	0–0	3–1	2–0	0–1	3–0	3–1	1–3	6–0	3–0		0–1	1–2	2–0	4–0	0–3	2–1	2–1	0–2	6–1	1–1	3–2	1–1	1–2	0–1
Darlington	3–0	2–0	2–2	2–1	2–1	1–3	2–2	1–2	0–0	3–0		1–1	1–2	1–0	2–0	5–1	1–2	0–0	1–0	2–1	1–2	1–0	1–1	1–2
Exeter City	2–1	3–2	2–1	1–3	1–0	0–2	0–0	2–0	1–6	2–1	2–0		3–0	0–0	2–1	0–1	4–0	2–2	2–2	1–0	4–1	1–1	0–1	1–0
Gillingham	1–0	4–4	0–2	1–0	0–2	1–1	0–0	2–0	2–1	2–1	1–0	1–0		3–0	1–2	0–1	3–1	5–0	2–2	1–0	1–1	4–0	2–2	1–1
Grimsby Town	0–1	1–0	0–1	3–3	1–3	0–1	1–2	1–3	0–1	1–1	1–2	2–2	3–0		5–1	2–2	0–0	2–3	0–1	3–0	0–0	3–0	1–0	1–1
Lincoln City	5–1	0–2	2–0	3–3	0–0	2–2	1–1	1–1	3–1	1–3	0–1	0–1	2–0	1–1		0–0	1–0	1–1	1–1	0–1	1–1	0–1	0–0	1–0
Luton Town	1–2	3–1	3–1	3–3	3–3	0–1	1–2	1–1	0–0	2–1	1–2	1–2	0–0	2–1	3–2		1–0	1–1	1–1	1–3	1–1	2–4	3–1	0–1
Macclesfield Town	0–2	4–2	2–1	0–2	0–2	2–0	1–1	3–1	1–1	0–4	0–6	1–4	0–1	1–0	1–2	2–1		0–1	1–1	0–2	0–1	1–2	3–0	0–0
Morecambe	1–1	2–0	2–1	0–4	2–1	2–0	0–0	3–1	2–2	1–2	1–0	1–1	0–1	1–1	1–1	1–2	4–1		1–0	1–1	1–1	1–3	1–0	0–0
Notts County	1–1	2–1	2–0	1–1	3–1	1–1	0–1	1–2	0–1	0–3	0–0	2–1	0–1	0–2	0–1	0–2	1–1	1–0		4–2	1–2	0–3	2–2	0–2
Port Vale	0–2	0–0	0–0	3–1	0–2	0–3	1–1	3–0	0–1	0–1	3–1	1–3	1–3	2–1	0–1	1–3	1–4	2–1	1–2		2–1	0–0	1–1	1–1
Rochdale	3–1	3–1	3–1	1–1	3–0	1–2	1–1	6–1	2–1	0–2	0–2	2–2	0–1	2–0	2–2	2–0	1–1	1–1	3–0	1–0		1–2	2–1	0–1
Rotherham United	0–0	1–2	3–4	1–0	0–2	0–0	1–1	3–1	3–0	1–1	0–1	0–1	2–0	4–1	1–0	1–0	2–0	3–2	2–1	1–0	2–2		1–2	0–0
Shrewsbury Town	2–0	1–0	2–2	4–1	2–0	1–3	1–0	1–0	2–1	2–1	1–0	1–1	7–0	1–1	0–0	3–0	4–0	0–0	3–2	1–2	1–1	1–0		0–1
Wycombe Wanderers	2–1	3–0	1–1	3–1	1–0	0–0	2–1	2–0	1–1	2–1	1–1	1–1	1–0	0–1	1–0	0–0	4–0	1–1	1–2	4–2	0–1	0–0	1–1	

Source: The Football League
Legend: Blue = home team win; Yellow = draw; Red = away team win.

=== Managerial changes ===
Team	Outgoing manager	Manner of departure	Date of vacancy	Replaced by	Date of appointment	Position in table
AFC Bournemouth	Kevin Bond	Contract terminated	1 September 2008	Jimmy Quinn	2 September 2008	23rd
Grimsby Town	Alan Buckley	Contract terminated	15 September 2008	Mike Newell	6 October 2008	20th
Port Vale	Lee Sinnott	Mutual consent	22 September 2008	Dean Glover	6 October 2008	16th
Chester City	Simon Davies	Contract terminated	11 November 2008	Mark Wright	14 November 2008	19th
Barnet	Paul Fairclough	Resigned	28 December 2008			21st
AFC Bournemouth	Jimmy Quinn	Contract terminated	31 December 2008	Eddie Howe	31 December 2008	23rd

=== Top scorers ===
Pos	Player	Team	Goals
1	(Canada) Simeon Jackson	Gillingham	21
2	(England) Grant Holt	Shrewsbury Town	20
2	(England) Jack Lester	Chesterfield	20
4	(England) Reuben Reid	Rotherham United	18
5	(England) Paul Benson	Dagenham & Redbridge	17
5	(Republic of Ireland) John O'Flynn	Barnet	17
5	(England) Adam Le Fondre	Rochdale	17
5	(England) Peter Thorne	Bradford City	17
5	(Jersey) Brett Pitman	AFC Bournemouth	17
10	(England) Andy Bishop	Bury	16
10	(England) Ryan Lowe	Chester City	16
10	(England) Charlie MacDonald	Brentford	16

== Notes ==
- Luton (−30), Bournemouth (−17) and Rotherham (−17) began the League Two season on negative points.
