= 2007–08 Football League One =

Football League One
- Season: 2007–08
- Promoted: Swansea City (champions); Nottingham Forest; Doncaster Rovers
- Relegated: AFC Bournemouth; Gillingham; Port Vale; Luton Town
- Goals: 1,335
- Average goals/game: 2.42
- Top goalscorer: Jason Scotland (24)
- Biggest home win: Swindon Town 6–0 Port Vale (19 April 2008)
- Biggest away win: Leyton Orient 0–5 Swansea City (6 October 2007)
- Highest scoring: Crewe Alexandra 4–3 Tranmere Rovers (1 January 2008); AFC Bournemouth 4–3 Luton Town (22 January 2008); Hartlepool United 4–3 Southend United (22 January 2008)
- Longest winning run: Carlisle United (8)
- Longest unbeaten run: Swansea City (25)
- Longest losing run: Port Vale (10)
- Highest attendance: Leeds United v Gillingham (38,256) (3 May 2008)
- Lowest attendance: Luton Town v Oldham Athletic (5,417) (15 March 2008)
- Average attendance: 7,993

The Football League 2007–08 (named Coca-Cola Football League for sponsorship reasons), was the sixteenth season under its current league division format. It began in August 2007 and concluded in May 2008, with the promotion play-off finals.

The Football League is contested through three Divisions. The second division of these is League One. The winner and the runner up of League One will be automatically promoted to the Football League Championship and they will be joined by the winner of the League One playoff. The bottom four teams in the league will be relegated to the third division, League Two.

Leeds United played at this level for the first time in their history having spent all their time in the top two divisions.

== Changes from last season ==
=== From League One ===
Promoted to Championship

- Scunthorpe United
- Bristol City
- Blackpool

Relegated to League Two

- Chesterfield
- Bradford City
- Rotherham United
- Brentford

=== To League One ===
Relegated from Championship

- Southend United
- Luton Town
- Leeds United

Promoted from League Two

- Walsall
- Hartlepool United
- Swindon Town
- Bristol Rovers

== League table ==
Pos	Team	Pld	W	D	L	GF	GA	GD	Pts	Promotion, qualification or relegation
1	Swansea City (C, P)	46	27	11	8	82	42	+40	92	Promotion to Football League Championship
2	Nottingham Forest (P)	46	22	16	8	64	32	+32	82	Promotion to Football League Championship
3	Doncaster Rovers (O, P)	46	23	11	12	65	41	+24	80	Qualification for League One play-offs
4	Carlisle United	46	23	11	12	64	46	+18	80	Qualification for League One play-offs
5	Leeds United	46	27	10	9	72	38	+34	76 (Note: Leeds deducted 15 points for failure to comply with rules on insolvency.)	Qualification for League One play-offs
6	Southend United	46	22	10	14	70	55	+15	76	Qualification for League One play-offs
7	Brighton & Hove Albion	46	19	12	15	58	50	+8	69	
8	Oldham Athletic	46	18	13	15	58	46	+12	67	
9	Northampton Town	46	17	15	14	60	55	+5	66	
10	Huddersfield Town	46	20	6	20	50	62	−12	66	
11	Tranmere Rovers	46	18	11	17	52	47	+5	65	
12	Walsall	46	16	16	14	52	46	+6	64	
13	Swindon Town	46	16	13	17	63	56	+7	61	
14	Leyton Orient	46	16	12	18	49	63	−14	60	
15	Hartlepool United	46	15	9	22	63	66	−3	54	
16	Bristol Rovers	46	12	17	17	45	53	−8	53	
17	Millwall	46	14	10	22	45	60	−15	52	
18	Yeovil Town	46	14	10	22	38	59	−21	52	
19	Cheltenham Town	46	13	12	21	42	64	−22	51	
20	Crewe Alexandra	46	12	14	20	47	65	−18	50	
21	AFC Bournemouth (R)	46	17	7	22	62	72	−10	48 (Note: Bournemouth deducted 10 points for entering administration.)	Relegation to Football League Two
22	Gillingham (R)	46	11	13	22	44	73	−29	46	Relegation to Football League Two
23	Port Vale (R)	46	9	11	26	47	81	−34	38	Relegation to Football League Two
24	Luton Town (R)	46	11	10	25	43	63	−20	33 (Note: Luton deducted 10 points each for entering administration.)	Relegation to Football League Two

Updated to match(es) played on unknown. Source: The Football League
Rules for classification: 1) points; 2) goal difference; 3) number of goals scored.
(C) Champions; (O) Play-off winners; (P) Promoted; (R) Relegated

== Play-offs ==
Semifinals
3	Doncaster Rovers	0	5	5
6	Southend United	0	1	1
4	Carlisle United	2	0	2
5	Leeds United	1	2	3

Final
3	Doncaster Rovers	1
5	Leeds United	0

== Results ==
Home \ Away	BOU	B&HA	BRR	CRL	CHL	CRE	DON	GIL	HAR	HUD	LEE	LEY	LUT	MIL	NOR	NOT	OLD	PTV	STD	SWA	SWI	TRA	WAL	YEO
AFC Bournemouth		0–2	2–1	1–3	2–2	1–0	0–2	1–0	2–0	0–1	1–3	3–1	4–3	2–0	1–1	2–0	0–3	0–1	1–4	1–4	2–2	2–1	1–1	2–0
Brighton & Hove Albion	3–2		0–0	2–2	2–1	3–0	1–0	4–2	2–1	1–1	0–1	0–0	3–1	3–0	2–1	0–2	1–0	2–3	3–2	0–1	2–1	0–0	1–1	1–2
Bristol Rovers	0–2	0–2		3–0	2–0	1–1	0–1	1–1	0–0	2–3	0–3	2–3	1–1	2–1	1–1	2–2	1–0	3–2	1–1	0–2	0–1	1–1	1–1	1–1
Carlisle United	1–1	2–0	1–1		1–0	1–0	1–0	2–0	4–2	2–1	3–1	1–0	2–1	4–0	2–0	0–2	1–0	3–2	1–2	0–0	3–0	0–1	2–1	2–1
Cheltenham Town	1–0	2–1	1–0	1–0		2–2	2–1	1–0	1–1	0–2	1–0	1–0	1–0	0–1	1–1	0–3	1–1	1–0	1–1	1–2	1–1	1–1	1–2	1–1
Crewe Alexandra	1–4	2–1	1–1	0–1	3–1		0–4	2–3	3–1	2–0	0–1	0–2	2–0	0–0	1–0	0–0	1–4	0–2	1–3	2–2	1–1	4–3	0–0	2–0
Doncaster Rovers	1–2	0–0	1–1	1–2	2–0	2–0		2–1	2–0	2–0	0–1	4–2	2–0	0–0	2–0	1–0	1–1	2–1	3–1	0–4	2–0	0–0	2–3	1–2
Gillingham	2–1	1–0	3–2	0–0	0–0	0–3	1–1		2–1	1–0	1–1	3–1	2–1	1–1	0–1	3–0	0–0	1–2	1–1	1–2	1–1	0–2	2–1	0–0
Hartlepool United	1–1	1–2	1–0	2–2	0–2	3–0	2–1	4–0		2–1	1–1	1–1	4–0	0–1	0–1	0–1	4–1	3–2	4–3	1–3	1–1	3–1	0–1	2–0
Huddersfield Town	1–0	2–1	2–1	0–2	2–3	1–1	2–2	1–3	2–0		1–0	0–1	2–0	1–0	1–2	1–1	1–1	3–1	1–2	0–1	1–0	1–0	2–0	1–0
Leeds United	2–0	0–0	1–0	3–2	1–2	1–1	0–1	2–1	2–0	4–0		1–1	1–0	4–2	3–0	1–1	1–3	3–0	4–1	2–0	2–1	0–2	2–0	1–0
Leyton Orient	1–0	2–2	3–1	0–3	2–0	0–1	1–1	0–0	2–4	0–1	0–2		2–1	0–1	2–2	0–1	1–0	3–1	2–2	0–5	2–1	3–0	1–0	0–0
Luton Town	1–4	1–2	1–2	0–0	1–1	2–1	1–1	3–1	2–1	0–1	1–1	0–1		1–1	4–1	2–1	3–0	2–1	1–0	1–3	0–1	1–0	0–1	1–0
Millwall	2–1	3–0	0–1	3–0	1–0	2–0	0–3	1–1	0–1	1–2	0–2	0–1	0–0		2–0	2–2	2–3	3–0	2–1	2–2	1–2	0–1	1–2	2–1
Northampton Town	4–1	1–0	0–1	2–2	2–1	0–0	2–0	4–0	1–1	3–0	1–1	2–0	2–1	1–1		1–2	2–0	2–1	0–1	4–2	1–1	2–1	0–2	1–2
Nottingham Forest	0–0	0–0	1–1	0–1	3–1	2–0	0–0	4–0	2–1	2–1	1–2	4–0	1–0	2–0	2–2		0–0	2–0	4–1	0–0	1–0	2–0	1–1	3–2
Oldham Athletic	2–0	1–1	0–1	2–0	2–1	3–2	1–1	2–1	0–1	4–1	0–1	2–0	1–1	1–1	0–1	0–0		1–1	0–1	2–1	2–2	3–1	0–2	3–0
Port Vale	1–3	0–1	1–1	1–1	3–0	0–1	1–3	2–1	0–2	0–0	3–3	2–1	1–2	3–1	2–2	0–2	0–3		1–2	0–2	2–1	0–0	1–1	2–2
Southend United	2–1	1–1	0–1	0–1	2–2	3–0	3–2	3–0	2–1	4–1	1–0	1–2	2–0	1–0	1–1	1–1	0–1	1–1		1–1	2–1	1–2	1–0	1–1
Swansea City	1–2	0–0	2–2	2–1	4–1	2–1	1–2	1–1	1–0	0–1	3–2	4–1	1–0	1–2	3–0	0–0	2–1	2–0	3–0		2–1	1–1	1–0	1–2
Swindon Town	4–1	0–3	1–0	2–2	3–0	1–1	1–2	5–0	2–1	3–2	0–1	1–1	2–1	2–1	1–1	2–1	3–0	6–0	0–1	1–1		1–0	0–3	0–1
Tranmere Rovers	3–1	2–0	0–2	2–0	1–0	1–1	0–1	2–0	3–1	3–0	1–2	1–1	2–1	2–0	2–2	0–2	0–1	2–0	1–0	0–1	2–1		0–0	2–1
Walsall	1–3	1–2	0–1	1–1	2–0	1–1	1–1	2–1	2–2	4–0	1–1	0–0	0–0	3–0	0–2	1–0	0–3	0–0	0–2	1–3	2–2	2–1		2–0
Yeovil Town	2–1	2–1	0–0	2–1	2–1	0–3	2–1	2–1	3–1	0–2	0–1	0–1	0–0	0–1	1–0	0–3	0–0	1–0	0–3	1–2	0–1	1–1	0–2	

Source: The Football League
Legend: Blue = home team win; Yellow = draw; Red = away team win.

== Top scorers ==
Pos	Player	Team	Goals
1	(Trinidad and Tobago) Jason Scotland	Swansea City	24
2	(Jamaica) Jermaine Beckford	Leeds United	20
3	(England) Nicky Forster	Brighton & Hove Albion	15
3	(England) Nicky Maynard	Crewe Alexandra	15
5	(England) Danny Graham	Carlisle United	14
5	(England) Rickie Lambert	Bristol Rovers	14
5	(England) Steven Gillespie	Cheltenham Town	14
5	(England) Adam Boyd	Leyton Orient	14
5	(England) Joe Garner	Carlisle United	14
5	(Republic of Ireland) Simon Cox	Swindon Town	14

== Key events ==
- On 4 August 2007, Leeds United are docked 15 points at start of the season for entering administration.
- On 22 November 2007, Luton Town were docked 10 points for being placed into administration after directors of the club decided to appoint administrators as a result of their loss of income.
- On 8 February 2008, AFC Bournemouth went to administration and were docked 10 points by the Football League with debts around £4 million.

== Managers ==
Club	Manager
AFC Bournemouth	Kevin Bond
Brighton & Hove Albion	Dean Wilkins
Bristol Rovers	Paul Trollope
Carlisle United	Neil McDonald
Cheltenham Town	John Ward
Crewe Alexandra	Steve Holland
Doncaster Rovers	Sean O'Driscoll
Gillingham	Ronnie Jepson
Hartlepool United	Danny Wilson
Huddersfield Town	Andy Ritchie
Leeds United	Dennis Wise
Leyton Orient	Martin Ling
Luton Town	Kevin Blackwell
Millwall	Willie Donachie
Northampton Town	Stuart Gray
Nottingham Forest	Colin Calderwood
Oldham Athletic	John Sheridan
Port Vale	Martin Foyle
Southend United	Steve Tilson
Swansea City	Roberto Martínez
Swindon Town	Paul Sturrock
Tranmere Rovers	Ronnie Moore
Walsall	Richard Money
Yeovil Town	Russell Slade

== Stadia and locations ==
Locations of the League One 2007–08 teams

Team	Stadium	Capacity
Leeds United	Elland Road	39,460
Nottingham Forest	City Ground	30,602
Huddersfield Town	Galpharm Stadium	24,500
Port Vale	Vale Park	22,356
Swansea City	Liberty Stadium	20,532
Millwall	The Den	20,146
Carlisle United	Brunton Park Stadium	16,981
Tranmere Rovers	Prenton Park	16,567
Swindon Town	The County Ground	15,728
Doncaster Rovers	Keepmoat Stadium	15,231
Southend United	Roots Hall	12,306
Bristol Rovers	Memorial Stadium	11,916
Gillingham	Priestfield Stadium	11,582
Walsall	Bescot Stadium	11,300
AFC Bournemouth	Dean Court	10,700
Oldham Athletic	Boundary Park	10,638
Luton Town	Kenilworth Road	10,260
Crewe Alexandra	Alexandra Stadium	10,046
Yeovil Town	Huish Park	9,978
Leyton Orient	Brisbane Road	9,271
Brighton & Hove Albion	Withdean Stadium	8,850
Hartlepool United	Victoria Park	7,691
Northampton Town	Sixfields Stadium	7,653
Cheltenham Town	Whaddon Road	7,408

== Managerial changes ==
Team	Outgoing manager	Manner of departure	Date of vacancy	Replaced by	Date of appointment	Position in table
Carlisle United	Neil McDonald	Contract terminated	13 August 2007	John Ward	2 October 2007	8th
Gillingham	Ronnie Jepson	Mutual consent	9 September 2007	Mark Stimson	1 November 2007	22nd
Port Vale	Martin Foyle	Mutual consent	26 September 2007	Lee Sinnott	5 November 2007	23rd
Cheltenham Town	John Ward	Mutual consent (hired by Carlisle United)	2 October 2007	Keith Downing	2 November 2007	23rd
Millwall	Willie Donachie	Contract terminated	8 October 2007	Kenny Jackett	6 November 2007	24th
Swindon Town	Paul Sturrock	Mutual consent (hired by Plymouth Argyle)	27 November 2007	Maurice Malpas	15 January 2008	11th
Luton Town	Kevin Blackwell	Contract terminated	16 January 2008	Mick Harford	16 January 2008	22nd
Leeds United	Dennis Wise	Mutual consent (hired by Newcastle United as executive director)	29 January 2008	Gary McAllister	29 January 2008	6th
Huddersfield Town	Andy Ritchie	Mutual consent	1 April 2008	Stan Ternent	24 April 2008	14th
Walsall	Richard Money	Mutual consent	22 April 2008	Jimmy Mullen	22 May 2008	8th
Brighton & Hove Albion	Dean Wilkins	Changing duties from manager to take over as first team coach	8 May 2008	Micky Adams	8 May 2008	7th
