= 2008–09 Football League One =

Football League One
- Season: 2008–09
- Champions: Leicester City
- Promoted: Leicester City; Peterborough United; Scunthorpe United
- Relegated: Northampton Town; Crewe Alexandra; Cheltenham Town; Hereford United
- Top goalscorer: Rickie Lambert; Simon Cox(29 each)

Locations of the League One 2008–09 teams

The Football League 2008–09 (named Coca-Cola Football League for sponsorship reasons), was the seventeenth season under its current league division format. It began in August 2008 and concluded in May 2009, with the promotion play-off finals.

The Football League is contested through three Divisions. The second division of these is League One. The winner and the runner up of League One will be automatically promoted to the Football League Championship and they will be joined by the winner of the League One playoff. The bottom four teams in the league will be relegated to the third division, League Two.

Leicester City played at this level for the first time in their history having spent all their time in the top two divisions. In the opposite direction, Hereford United made their first appearance in the third tier since 1978, after many seasons in non-league and lower-league football.

== Changes from last season ==
=== From League One ===
Promoted to Championship

- Swansea City
- Nottingham Forest
- Doncaster Rovers

Relegated to League Two

- Bournemouth
- Gillingham
- Port Vale
- Luton Town

=== To League One ===
Relegated from Championship

- Leicester City
- Colchester United
- Scunthorpe United

Promoted from League Two

- Milton Keynes Dons
- Peterborough United
- Hereford United
- Stockport County

== League table ==
| Pos | Team | Pld | W | D | L | GF | GA | GD | Pts | Promotion or relegation |
|---|---|---|---|---|---|---|---|---|---|---|
| 1 | Leicester City (C, P) | 46 | 27 | 15 | 4 | 84 | 39 | +45 | 96 | Promotion to Football League Championship |
| 2 | Peterborough United (P) | 46 | 26 | 11 | 9 | 78 | 54 | +24 | 89 | Promotion to Football League Championship |
| 3 | Milton Keynes Dons | 46 | 26 | 9 | 11 | 83 | 47 | +36 | 87 | Qualification for League One play-offs |
| 4 | Leeds United | 46 | 26 | 6 | 14 | 77 | 49 | +28 | 84 | Qualification for League One play-offs |
| 5 | Millwall | 46 | 25 | 7 | 14 | 63 | 53 | +10 | 82 | Qualification for League One play-offs |
| 6 | Scunthorpe United (O, P) | 46 | 22 | 10 | 14 | 82 | 63 | +19 | 76 | Qualification for League One play-offs |
| 7 | Tranmere Rovers | 46 | 21 | 11 | 14 | 62 | 49 | +13 | 74 | |
| 8 | Southend United | 46 | 21 | 8 | 17 | 58 | 61 | −3 | 71 | |
| 9 | Huddersfield Town | 46 | 18 | 14 | 14 | 62 | 65 | −3 | 68 | |
| 10 | Oldham Athletic | 46 | 16 | 17 | 13 | 66 | 65 | +1 | 65 | |
| 11 | Bristol Rovers | 46 | 17 | 12 | 17 | 79 | 61 | +18 | 63 | |
| 12 | Colchester United | 46 | 18 | 9 | 19 | 58 | 58 | 0 | 63 | |
| 13 | Walsall | 46 | 17 | 10 | 19 | 61 | 66 | −5 | 61 | |
| 14 | Leyton Orient | 46 | 15 | 11 | 20 | 45 | 57 | −12 | 56 | |
| 15 | Swindon Town | 46 | 12 | 17 | 17 | 68 | 71 | −3 | 53 | |
| 16 | Brighton & Hove Albion | 46 | 13 | 13 | 20 | 55 | 70 | −15 | 52 | |
| 17 | Yeovil Town | 46 | 12 | 15 | 19 | 41 | 66 | −25 | 51 | |
| 18 | Stockport County | 46 | 16 | 12 | 18 | 59 | 57 | +2 | 50 (Note: Stockport County deducted 10 points for entering administration.) | |
| 19 | Hartlepool United | 46 | 13 | 11 | 22 | 66 | 79 | −13 | 50 | |
| 20 | Carlisle United | 46 | 12 | 14 | 20 | 56 | 69 | −13 | 50 | |
| 21 | Northampton Town (R) | 46 | 12 | 13 | 21 | 61 | 65 | −4 | 49 | Relegation to Football League Two |
| 22 | Crewe Alexandra (R) | 46 | 12 | 10 | 24 | 59 | 82 | −23 | 46 | Relegation to Football League Two |
| 23 | Cheltenham Town (R) | 46 | 9 | 12 | 25 | 51 | 91 | −40 | 39 | Relegation to Football League Two |
| 24 | Hereford United (R) | 46 | 9 | 7 | 30 | 42 | 79 | −37 | 34 | Relegation to Football League Two |

Updated to match(es) played on 2 May 2009. Source: The Football League
Rules for classification: 1) points; 2) goal difference; 3) number of goals scored.
(C) Champions; (O) Play-off winners; (P) Promoted; (R) Relegated

=== Play-offs ===
Semi-finals
6 | Scunthorpe United | 1 | 0 (7) | 1
3 | Milton Keynes Dons | 1 | 0 (6) | 1
5 | Millwall | 1 | 1 | 2
4 | Leeds United | 0 | 1 | 1

Final
6 | Scunthorpe United | 3
5 | Millwall | 2

== Results ==
| Home \ Away | B&HA | BRR | CRL | CHL | COL | CRE | HAR | HER | HUD | LEE | LEI | LEY | MIL | MKD | NOR | OLD | PET | SCU | STD | STP | SWI | TRA | WAL | YEO |
|---|---|---|---|---|---|---|---|---|---|---|---|---|---|---|---|---|---|---|---|---|---|---|---|---|
| Brighton & Hove Albion | | 1–1 | 0–2 | 3–3 | 1–2 | 0–4 | 2–1 | 0–0 | 0–1 | 0–2 | 3–2 | 0–0 | 4–1 | 2–4 | 1–1 | 3–1 | 2–4 | 1–4 | 1–3 | 1–0 | 2–3 | 0–0 | 0–1 | 5–0 |
| Bristol Rovers | 1–2 | | 2–3 | 3–2 | 0–0 | 0–0 | 4–1 | 6–1 | 1–2 | 2–2 | 0–1 | 2–1 | 4–2 | 1–2 | 1–0 | 2–0 | 0–1 | 1–2 | 4–2 | 2–0 | 2–2 | 2–0 | 1–3 | 3–0 |
| Carlisle United | 3–1 | 1–1 | | 1–0 | 0–2 | 4–2 | 0–1 | 1–2 | 3–0 | 0–2 | 1–2 | 1–3 | 2–0 | 3–2 | 1–1 | 1–1 | 3–3 | 1–1 | 2–1 | 1–2 | 1–1 | 1–2 | 1–1 | 4–1 |
| Cheltenham Town | 2–2 | 2–1 | 1–1 | | 4–3 | 1–0 | 2–0 | 2–3 | 1–2 | 0–1 | 0–4 | 0–1 | 1–3 | 3–5 | 0–1 | 1–1 | 3–6 | 1–2 | 0–0 | 2–2 | 2–0 | 1–0 | 0–0 | 1–0 |
| Colchester United | 0–1 | 0–1 | 5–0 | 3–1 | | 0–1 | 1–1 | 1–2 | 0–0 | 0–1 | 0–1 | 1–0 | 1–2 | 0–3 | 2–1 | 2–2 | 0–1 | 0–0 | 0–1 | 1–0 | 3–2 | 0–1 | 0–2 | 1–0 |
| Crewe Alexandra | 1–2 | 1–1 | 1–2 | 1–2 | 2–0 | | 0–0 | 2–1 | 3–1 | 2–3 | 0–3 | 0–2 | 0–1 | 2–2 | 1–3 | 0–3 | 1–1 | 3–2 | 3–4 | 0–3 | 1–0 | 2–1 | 2–1 | 2–0 |
| Hartlepool United | 1–0 | 1–1 | 2–2 | 4–1 | 4–2 | 1–4 | | 4–2 | 5–3 | 0–1 | 2–2 | 0–1 | 2–3 | 1–3 | 2–0 | 3–3 | 1–2 | 2–3 | 3–0 | 0–1 | 3–3 | 2–1 | 2–2 | 0–0 |
| Hereford United | 1–2 | 0–3 | 1–0 | 3–0 | 0–2 | 2–0 | 1–1 | | 0–1 | 2–0 | 1–3 | 2–1 | 0–2 | 0–1 | 0–2 | 5–0 | 0–1 | 1–2 | 0–1 | 0–1 | 1–1 | 2–2 | 0–0 | 1–2 |
| Huddersfield Town | 2–2 | 1–1 | 1–0 | 2–2 | 2–2 | 3–2 | 1–1 | 2–0 | | 1–0 | 2–3 | 0–1 | 1–2 | 1–3 | 3–2 | 1–1 | 1–0 | 2–0 | 0–1 | 1–1 | 2–1 | 1–2 | 2–1 | 0–0 |
| Leeds United | 3–1 | 2–2 | 0–2 | 2–0 | 1–2 | 5–2 | 4–1 | 1–0 | 1–2 | | 1–1 | 2–1 | 2–0 | 2–0 | 3–0 | 0–2 | 3–1 | 3–2 | 2–0 | 1–0 | 1–0 | 3–1 | 3–0 | 4–0 |
| Leicester City | 0–0 | 2–1 | 2–2 | 4–0 | 1–1 | 2–1 | 1–0 | 2–1 | 4–2 | 1–0 | | 3–0 | 0–1 | 2–0 | 0–0 | 0–0 | 4–0 | 2–2 | 3–0 | 1–1 | 1–1 | 3–1 | 2–2 | 1–0 |
| Leyton Orient | 2–1 | 1–2 | 0–0 | 1–2 | 2–1 | 1–0 | 1–0 | 2–1 | 1–1 | 2–2 | 1–3 | | 0–0 | 1–2 | 1–3 | 2–1 | 2–3 | 2–2 | 1–1 | 0–3 | 1–2 | 0–1 | 0–1 | 0–1 |
| Millwall | 0–1 | 3–2 | 1–0 | 2–0 | 0–1 | 0–0 | 2–0 | 1–0 | 2–1 | 3–1 | 0–1 | 2–1 | | 0–4 | 1–0 | 2–3 | 2–0 | 1–2 | 1–1 | 1–0 | 1–1 | 1–0 | 3–1 | 1–1 |
| Milton Keynes Dons | 2–0 | 2–1 | 3–1 | 3–1 | 1–1 | 2–2 | 3–1 | 3–0 | 1–1 | 3–1 | 2–2 | 1–2 | 0–1 | | 1–0 | 6–2 | 1–2 | 0–2 | 2–0 | 1–2 | 1–2 | 1–0 | 0–1 | 3–0 |
| Northampton Town | 2–2 | 0–0 | 1–0 | 4–2 | 1–2 | 5–1 | 1–0 | 2–1 | 1–1 | 2–1 | 1–2 | 1–1 | 0–0 | 0–1 | | 0–1 | 1–1 | 3–3 | 2–3 | 4–0 | 3–4 | 1–1 | 0–2 | 3–0 |
| Oldham Athletic | 1–1 | 0–2 | 0–0 | 4–0 | 0–1 | 1–1 | 2–1 | 4–0 | 1–1 | 1–1 | 1–1 | 1–1 | 4–3 | 2–0 | 2–1 | | 1–2 | 3–0 | 1–1 | 3–1 | 0–0 | 0–2 | 3–2 | 0–2 |
| Peterborough United | 0–0 | 5–4 | 1–0 | 1–1 | 2–1 | 4–2 | 1–2 | 2–0 | 4–0 | 2–0 | 2–0 | 3–0 | 1–0 | 0–0 | 1–0 | 2–2 | | 2–1 | 1–2 | 1–0 | 2–2 | 2–2 | 1–0 | 1–3 |
| Scunthorpe United | 2–0 | 0–2 | 2–1 | 3–0 | 3–0 | 3–0 | 3–0 | 3–0 | 1–2 | 1–2 | 1–2 | 2–1 | 3–2 | 0–1 | 4–4 | 2–0 | 1–0 | | 1–1 | 2–1 | 3–3 | 1–1 | 1–1 | 2–0 |
| Southend United | 0–2 | 1–0 | 3–0 | 2–0 | 3–3 | 0–1 | 3–2 | 1–0 | 0–1 | 1–0 | 0–2 | 3–0 | 0–1 | 0–2 | 1–0 | 1–2 | 1–0 | 2–0 | | 1–1 | 2–1 | 2–1 | 2–0 | 0–1 |
| Stockport County | 2–0 | 3–1 | 3–0 | 1–0 | 1–2 | 4–3 | 2–1 | 4–1 | 1–1 | 1–3 | 0–0 | 0–1 | 2–2 | 0–1 | 1–1 | 3–1 | 1–3 | 0–3 | 3–1 | | 1–1 | 0–0 | 1–2 | 0–0 |
| Swindon Town | 0–2 | 2–1 | 1–1 | 2–2 | 1–3 | 0–0 | 0–1 | 3–0 | 1–3 | 1–3 | 2–2 | 0–1 | 1–2 | 1–1 | 2–1 | 2–0 | 2–2 | 4–2 | 3–0 | 1–1 | | 3–1 | 3–2 | 2–3 |
| Tranmere Rovers | 1–0 | 2–0 | 4–1 | 2–0 | 3–4 | 2–0 | 1–0 | 2–1 | 3–1 | 2–1 | 2–0 | 0–0 | 1–3 | 1–1 | 4–1 | 0–1 | 1–1 | 2–0 | 2–2 | 2–1 | 1–0 | | 2–1 | 1–1 |
| Walsall | 3–0 | 0–5 | 2–1 | 1–1 | 2–0 | 1–1 | 2–3 | 1–1 | 2–3 | 1–0 | 1–4 | 0–2 | 1–2 | 0–3 | 3–1 | 1–2 | 1–2 | 2–1 | 5–2 | 1–0 | 2–1 | 0–1 | | 2–0 |
| Yeovil Town | 1–1 | 2–2 | 1–1 | 1–1 | 0–2 | 3–2 | 2–3 | 2–2 | 1–0 | 1–1 | 0–2 | 0–0 | 2–0 | 0–0 | 1–0 | 2–2 | 0–1 | 1–2 | 1–2 | 2–4 | 1–0 | 1–0 | 1–1 | |

Source: The Football League
Legend: Blue = home team win; Yellow = draw; Red = away team win.

== Top scorers ==
Correct as of 8 May 2009

| Pos | Player | Club | Goals |
|---|---|---|---|
| 1 | (England) Rickie Lambert | Bristol Rovers | 29 |
| 1 | (Republic of Ireland) Simon Cox | Swindon Town | 29 |
| 3 | (England) Matty Fryatt | Leicester City | 27 |
| 3 | (Jamaica) Jermaine Beckford | Leeds United | 27 |
| 5 | (England) Gary Hooper | Scunthorpe United | 24 |
| 6 | (Scotland) Craig Mackail-Smith | Peterborough United | 23 |
| 7 | (England) Lee Hughes | Oldham Athletic | 18 |
| 7 | (England) Aaron McLean | Peterborough United | 18 |
| 7 | (Australia) Joel Porter | Hartlepool United | 18 |
| 10 | (England) Paul Hayes | Scunthorpe United | 17 |

== Dubious goals panel ==
- On 30 August 2008, Leeds United drew 2–2 with Bristol Rovers. The first goal was a Jermaine Beckford shot which deflected off Steve Elliott. The goal was originally an Elliott own goal, but was later awarded to Beckford.
- On 7 April 2009, Leyton Orient drew 2–2 with Leeds United. Orient's first goal was from a Sean Thornton free-kick, but it took a slight deflection from Simon Church on its way in. BBC Sport awarded the goal to Thornton, but it is still unclear what the final decision will be regarding the actual scorer. Church later claimed the goal and stated that he definitely got a vital touch on the ball.
- On 11 April 2009, Leyton Orient beat Colchester United 2–1. Orient's second goal was credited to Jimmy Smith, but it looked to have been put over the line by Scott McGleish, but it is unclear what the decision on the goalscorer will be at present.

== Key events ==
30 April 2009 – Stockport County are docked 10 points by the FA for entering administration.

== Stadiums ==
| Team | Stadium | Capacity |
|---|---|---|
| Leeds United | Elland Road | 39,460 |
| Leicester City | Walkers Stadium | 32,500 |
| Huddersfield Town | Galpharm Stadium | 24,500 |
| Milton Keynes Dons | stadium:mk | 22,000 |
| Millwall | The Den | 20,146 |
| Carlisle United | Brunton Park Stadium | 16,981 |
| Tranmere Rovers | Prenton Park | 16,567 |
| Swindon Town | The County Ground | 15,728 |
| Peterborough United | London Road Stadium | 15,460 |
| Southend United | Roots Hall | 12,306 |
| Bristol Rovers | Memorial Stadium | 11,916 |
| Walsall | Bescot Stadium | 11,300 |
| Stockport County | Edgeley Park | 10,651 |
| Oldham Athletic | Boundary Park | 10,638 |
| Crewe Alexandra | Alexandra Stadium | 10,046 |
| Colchester United | Colchester Community Stadium | 10,000 |
| Yeovil Town | Huish Park | 9,978 |
| Leyton Orient | Brisbane Road | 9,271 |
| Scunthorpe United | Glanford Park | 9,183 |
| Brighton & Hove Albion | Withdean Stadium | 8,850 |
| Hartlepool United | Victoria Park | 7,691 |
| Northampton Town | Sixfields Stadium | 7,653 |
| Cheltenham Town | Whaddon Road | 7,408 |
| Hereford United | Edgar Street | 7,100 |

== Managerial changes ==
| Team | Outgoing manager | Manner of departure | Date of vacancy | Replaced by | Date of appointment | Position in table |
|---|---|---|---|---|---|---|
| Milton Keynes Dons | Paul Ince | Signed by Blackburn Rovers (mutual consent) | 22 June 2008 | Roberto Di Matteo | 2 July 2008 | Pre-season |
| Cheltenham Town | Keith Downing | Mutual consent | 13 September 2008 | Martin Allen | 15 September 2008 | 24th |
| Colchester United | Geraint Williams | Mutual consent | 22 September 2008 | Paul Lambert | 24 September 2008 | 23rd |
| Carlisle United | John Ward | Mutual consent | 3 November 2008 | Greg Abbott | 5 December 2008 | 20th |
| Huddersfield Town | Stan Ternent | Mutual consent | 4 November 2008 | Lee Clark | 11 December 2008 | 16th |
| Swindon Town | Maurice Malpas | Mutual consent | 14 November 2008 | Danny Wilson | 26 December 2008 | 16th |
| Crewe Alexandra | Steve Holland | Contract terminated | 18 November 2008 | Guðjón Þórðarson | 24 December 2008 | 24th |
| Hartlepool United | Danny Wilson | Contract terminated | 15 December 2008 | Chris Turner | 15 December 2008 | 13th |
| Leeds United | Gary McAllister | Contract terminated | 21 December 2008 | Simon Grayson | 23 December 2008 | 9th |
| Walsall | Jimmy Mullen | Contract terminated | 10 January 2009 | Chris Hutchings | 20 January 2009 | 12th |
| Leyton Orient | Martin Ling | Mutual Consent | 18 January 2009 | Geraint Williams | 5 February 2009 | 21st |
| Yeovil Town | Russell Slade | Contract terminated | 16 February 2009 | Terry Skiverton | 18 February 2009 | 16th |
| Brighton & Hove Albion | Micky Adams | Contract terminated | 21 February 2009 | Russell Slade | 6 March 2009 | 21st |
| Oldham Athletic | John Sheridan | Mutual Consent | 15 March 2009 | Joe Royle | 15 March 2009 | 8th |
