= 2009–10 Football League =

111th season of the Football League

The Football League
- Season: 2009–10
- Champions: Newcastle United
- Promoted: Newcastle United; West Bromwich Albion; Blackpool
- Relegated: Grimsby Town; Darlington
- New clubs in league: Burton Albion; Torquay United

The 2009–10 Football League (known as the Coca-Cola Football League for sponsorship reasons) was the 111th completed season of the Football League. It began in August 2009 and concluded in May 2010, with the promotion play-off finals. The Football League is contested through three Divisions. The divisions are the League Championship, League One and League Two. The winner and the runner-up of the League Championship are automatically promoted to the Premier League and they are joined by the winner of the League Championship play-off. The bottom two teams in League Two are relegated to the Conference Premier.

The league was won by Newcastle United, with West Bromwich Albion as runners up. Both teams were promoted to the Premier League. Sheffield Wednesday, Plymouth Argyle and Peterborough United were relegated into League One. Grimsby Town and Darlington were relegated from the Football League. Attendance levels in the Football League in the 2009–10 season were the highest for 50 years, with 17.1m people paying to watch games in the three divisions.

== Promotion and relegation ==
The following teams were either promoted or relegated for the 2009–10 season based upon the results of the previous year.

From Premier League

- Relegated to Championship
  - Newcastle United
  - Middlesbrough
  - West Bromwich Albion

From Championship

- Promoted to Premier League
  - Wolverhampton Wanderers
  - Birmingham City
  - Burnley
- Relegated to League One
  - Norwich City
  - Southampton
  - Charlton Athletic

From Football League One

- Promoted to Championship
  - Leicester City
  - Peterborough United
  - Scunthorpe United
- Relegated to League Two
  - Northampton Town
  - Crewe Alexandra
  - Cheltenham Town
  - Hereford United

From Football League Two

- Promoted to League One
  - Brentford
  - Exeter City
  - Wycombe Wanderers
  - Gillingham
- Relegated to Conference Premier
  - Chester City
  - Luton Town

From Conference Premier

- Promoted to League Two
  - Burton Albion
  - Torquay United

== Championship ==
=== Table ===
Pos	Team	Pld	W	D	L	GF	GA	GD	Pts	Promotion, qualification or relegation
1	Newcastle United (C, P)	46	30	12	4	90	35	+55	102	Promotion to the Premier League
2	West Bromwich Albion (P)	46	26	13	7	89	48	+41	91	Promotion to the Premier League
3	Nottingham Forest	46	22	13	11	65	40	+25	79	Qualification for Championship play-offs
4	Cardiff City	46	22	10	14	73	54	+19	76	Qualification for Championship play-offs
5	Leicester City	46	21	13	12	61	45	+16	76	Qualification for Championship play-offs
6	Blackpool (O, P)	46	19	13	14	74	58	+16	70	Qualification for Championship play-offs
7	Swansea City	46	17	18	11	40	37	+3	69	
8	Sheffield United	46	17	14	15	62	55	+7	65	
9	Reading	46	17	12	17	68	63	+5	63	
10	Bristol City	46	15	18	13	56	65	−9	63	
11	Middlesbrough	46	16	14	16	58	50	+8	62	
12	Doncaster Rovers	46	15	15	16	59	58	+1	60	
13	Queens Park Rangers	46	14	15	17	58	65	−7	57	
14	Derby County	46	15	11	20	53	63	−10	56	
15	Ipswich Town	46	12	20	14	50	61	−11	56	
16	Watford	46	14	12	20	61	68	−7	54	
17	Preston North End	46	13	15	18	58	73	−15	54	
18	Barnsley	46	14	12	20	53	69	−16	54	
19	Coventry City	46	13	15	18	47	64	−17	54	
20	Scunthorpe United	46	14	10	22	62	84	−22	52	
21	Crystal Palace	46	14	17	15	50	53	−3	49 (Note: Crystal Palace were given a ten-point deduction for entering administration.)	
22	Sheffield Wednesday (R)	46	11	14	21	49	69	−20	47	Relegation to Football League One
23	Plymouth Argyle (R)	46	11	8	27	43	68	−25	41	Relegation to Football League One
24	Peterborough United (R)	46	8	10	28	46	80	−34	34	Relegation to Football League One

Source: The Football League
Rules for classification: 1) points; 2) goal difference; 3) number of goals scored.
(C) Champions; (O) Play-off winners; (P) Promoted; (R) Relegated

=== Play-offs ===
Semi-finals
6	Blackpool	2	4	6
3	Nottingham Forest	1	3	4
5	Leicester City	0	3	3
4	Cardiff City (p)	1	2	3

Final at Wembley
6	Blackpool	3
4	Cardiff City	2

=== First leg ===
8 May 2010
12:45 BST

Blackpool	2–1	Nottingham Forest
Southern 26'; Adam 57' (pen.)	(Report)	13' Cohen

Bloomfield Road, Blackpool
Attendance: 11,805
Referee: Phil Dowd
9 May 2010
13:15 BST

Leicester City	0–1	Cardiff City
	(Report)	13' Whittingham

Walkers Stadium, Leicester
Attendance: 29,165
Referee: Alan Wiley

=== Second leg ===
11 May 2010
19:45 BST

Nottingham Forest	3–4	Blackpool
Earnshaw 7', 66'; Adebola 90+2'	(Report)	56', 76', 79' Campbell; 72' Dobbie

City Ground, Nottingham
Attendance: 28,358
Referee: Mark Clattenburg

Blackpool win 6–4 on aggregate

12 May 2010
19:45 BST

Cardiff City	2 – 3 (a.e.t.)	Leicester City
Chopra 21'; Whittingham 69' (pen.)	(Report)	25' Fryatt; 36' (o.g.) Hudson; 49' King
Penalties
Chopra (penalty scored); McCormack (penalty scored); Ledley (penalty scored); Kennedy (penalty scored)	4–3	(penalty scored) Berner; (penalty scored) Howard; (penalty scored) Solano; (penalty missed) Kermorgant; (penalty missed) Waghorn

Cardiff City Stadium, Cardiff
Attendance: 26,033
Referee: Howard Webb

Cardiff City 3–3 Leicester City on aggregate. Cardiff City win 4–3 on penalties

=== Final ===
22 May 2010
15:00 BST

Blackpool	3–2	Cardiff City
Adam 12'; Taylor-Fletcher 39'; Ormerod 45'	(Report)	8' Chopra; 36' Ledley

Wembley Stadium, London
Attendance: 82,244
Referee: Andre Marriner

Blackpool are promoted to the Premier League

=== Results ===
Fixtures for the 2009–10 season were announced by The Football League on 17 June 2009.

Home \ Away	BAR	BLP	BRI	CAR	COV	CRY	DER	DON	IPS	LEI	MID	NEW	NOT	PET	PLY	PNE	QPR	REA	SCU	SHU	SHW	SWA	WAT	WBA
Barnsley		1–0	2–3	1–0	0–2	0–0	0–0	0–1	2–1	1–0	2–1	2–2	2–1	2–2	1–3	0–3	0–1	1–3	1–1	2–2	1–2	0–0	1–0	3–1
Blackpool	1–2		1–1	1–1	3–0	2–2	0–0	2–0	1–0	1–2	2–0	2–1	3–1	2–0	2–0	1–1	2–2	2–0	4–1	3–0	1–2	5–1	3–2	2–3
Bristol City	5–3	2–0		0–6	1–1	1–0	2–1	2–5	0–0	1–1	2–1	2–2	1–1	1–1	3–1	4–2	1–0	1–1	1–1	2–3	1–1	1–0	2–2	2–1
Cardiff City	0–2	1–1	3–0		2–0	1–1	6–1	2–1	1–2	2–1	1–0	0–1	1–1	2–0	0–1	1–0	0–2	0–0	4–0	1–1	3–2	2–1	3–1	1–1
Coventry City	3–1	1–1	1–1	1–2		1–1	0–1	1–0	2–1	1–1	2–2	0–2	1–0	3–2	1–1	1–1	1–0	1–3	2–1	3–2	1–1	0–1	0–4	0–0
Crystal Palace	1–1	4–1	0–1	1–2	0–1		1–0	0–3	3–1	0–1	1–0	0–2	1–1	2–0	1–1	3–1	0–2	1–3	0–4	1–0	0–0	0–1	3–0	1–1
Derby County	2–3	0–2	1–0	2–0	2–1	1–1		0–2	1–3	1–0	2–2	3–0	1–0	2–1	2–1	5–3	2–4	2–1	1–4	0–1	3–0	0–1	2–0	2–2
Doncaster Rovers	0–1	3–3	1–0	2–0	0–0	1–1	2–1		3–3	0–1	1–4	0–1	1–0	3–1	1–2	1–1	2–0	1–2	4–3	1–1	1–0	0–0	2–1	2–3
Ipswich Town	1–0	3–1	0–0	2–0	3–2	1–3	1–0	1–1		0–0	1–1	0–4	1–1	0–0	0–2	1–1	3–0	2–1	1–0	0–3	0–0	1–1	1–1	1–1
Leicester City	1–0	2–1	1–3	1–0	2–2	2–0	0–0	0–0	1–1		2–0	0–0	3–0	1–1	1–0	1–2	4–0	1–2	5–1	2–1	3–0	2–1	4–1	1–2
Middlesbrough	2–1	0–3	0–0	0–1	1–1	1–1	2–0	2–0	3–1	0–1		2–2	1–1	1–0	0–1	2–0	2–0	1–1	3–0	0–0	1–0	1–1	0–1	0–5
Newcastle United	6–1	4–1	0–0	5–1	4–1	2–0	0–0	2–1	2–2	1–0	2–0		2–0	3–1	3–1	3–0	1–1	3–0	3–0	2–1	1–0	3–0	2–0	2–2
Nottingham Forest	1–0	0–1	1–1	0–0	2–0	2–0	3–2	4–1	3–0	5–1	1–0	1–0		1–0	3–0	3–0	5–0	2–1	2–0	1–0	2–1	1–0	2–4	0–1
Peterborough United	1–2	0–1	1–0	4–4	0–1	1–1	0–3	1–2	3–1	1–2	2–2	2–3	1–2		1–2	0–1	1–0	3–2	3–0	1–0	1–1	2–2	2–1	2–3
Plymouth Argyle	0–0	0–2	3–2	1–3	0–1	0–1	1–0	2–1	1–1	1–1	0–2	0–2	0–1	1–2		1–1	1–1	4–1	2–1	0–1	1–3	1–1	0–1	0–1
Preston North End	1–4	0–0	2–2	3–0	3–2	1–1	0–0	1–1	2–0	0–1	2–2	0–1	3–2	2–0	2–0		2–2	1–2	3–2	2–1	2–2	2–0	1–1	0–0
Queens Park Rangers	5–2	1–1	2–1	0–1	2–2	1–1	1–1	2–1	1–2	1–2	1–5	0–1	1–1	1–1	2–0	4–0		4–1	0–1	1–1	1–1	1–1	1–0	3–1
Reading	1–0	2–1	2–0	0–1	3–0	2–4	4–1	0–0	1–1	0–1	0–2	1–2	0–0	6–0	2–1	4–1	1–0		1–1	1–3	5–0	1–1	1–1	1–1
Scunthorpe United	2–1	2–4	3–0	1–1	1–0	1–2	3–2	2–2	1–1	1–1	0–2	2–1	2–2	4–0	2–1	3–1	0–1	2–2		3–1	2–0	0–2	2–2	1–3
Sheffield United	0–0	3–0	2–0	3–4	1–0	2–0	1–1	1–1	3–3	1–1	1–0	0–1	0–0	1–0	4–3	1–0	1–1	3–0	0–1		3–2	2–0	2–0	2–2
Sheffield Wednesday	2–2	2–0	0–1	3–1	2–0	2–2	0–0	0–2	0–1	2–0	1–3	2–2	1–1	2–1	2–1	1–2	1–2	0–2	4–0	1–1		0–2	2–1	0–4
Swansea City	3–1	0–0	0–0	3–2	0–0	0–0	1–0	0–0	0–0	1–0	0–3	1–1	0–1	1–0	1–0	2–0	2–0	0–0	3–0	2–1	0–0		1–1	0–2
Watford	1–0	2–2	2–0	0–4	2–3	1–3	0–1	1–1	2–1	3–3	1–1	1–2	0–0	0–1	1–0	2–0	3–1	3–0	3–0	3–0	4–1	0–1		1–1
West Bromwich Albion	1–1	3–2	4–1	0–2	1–0	0–1	3–1	3–1	2–0	3–0	2–0	1–1	1–3	2–0	3–1	3–2	2–2	3–1	2–0	3–1	1–0	0–1	5–0	

Updated to match(es) played on 2 May 2010. Source: The Football League
Legend: Blue = home team win; Yellow = draw; Red = away team win.

=== Managerial changes ===
Team	Outgoing manager	Manner of departure	Date of vacancy	Replaced by	Date of appointment	Position in table
Blackpool	Simon Grayson	Signed by Leeds United	23 December 2008	Ian Holloway	21 May 2009	Pre-season
Queens Park Rangers	Paulo Sousa	Sacked	9 April 2009	Jim Magilton	3 June 2009	Pre-season
Reading	Steve Coppell	Resigned	13 May 2009	Brendan Rodgers	5 June 2009	Pre-season
Watford	Brendan Rodgers	Signed by Reading	5 June 2009	Malky Mackay	15 June 2009	Pre-season
Swansea City	Roberto Martínez	Signed by Wigan Athletic	15 June 2009	Paulo Sousa	23 June 2009	Pre-season
West Bromwich Albion	Tony Mowbray	Signed by Celtic	16 June 2009	Roberto Di Matteo	30 June 2009	Pre-season
Barnsley	Simon Davey	Mutual Consent	29 August 2009	Mark Robins	9 September 2009	24th
Middlesbrough	Gareth Southgate	Sacked	21 October 2009	Gordon Strachan	26 October 2009	4th
Peterborough United	Darren Ferguson	Mutual Consent	10 November 2009	Mark Cooper	14 November 2009	24th
Plymouth Argyle	Paul Sturrock	Sacked	10 December 2009	Paul Mariner	10 December 2009	23rd
Sheffield Wednesday	Brian Laws	Mutual Consent	13 December 2009	Alan Irvine	8 January 2010	22nd
Queens Park Rangers	Jim Magilton	Mutual Consent	16 December 2009	Paul Hart	17 December 2009	12th
Reading	Brendan Rodgers	Mutual Consent	17 December 2009	Brian McDermott	27 January 2010	21st
Preston North End	Alan Irvine	Sacked	29 December 2009	Darren Ferguson	6 January 2010	16th
Queens Park Rangers	Paul Hart	Mutual Consent	15 January 2010	Neil Warnock	2 March 2010	10th
Peterborough United	Mark Cooper	Sacked	1 February 2010	Jim Gannon	2 February 2010	24th
Crystal Palace	Neil Warnock	Signed by Queens Park Rangers	2 March 2010	Paul Hart	4 March 2010	21st
Bristol City	Gary Johnson	Mutual Consent	18 March 2010	Steve Coppell	22 April 2010	15th
Peterborough United	Jim Gannon	Mutual Consent	6 April 2010	Gary Johnson	6 April 2010	24th
Coventry City	Chris Coleman	Sacked	4 May 2010	Aidy Boothroyd	22 May 2010	19th
Plymouth Argyle	Paul Mariner	Mutual Consent	6 May 2010	Peter Reid	24 June 2010	23rd
Crystal Palace	Paul Hart	End of Contract	17 June 2010	George Burley	17 June 2010	21st

== League One ==
=== Table ===
Pos	Team	Pld	W	D	L	GF	GA	GD	Pts	Promotion, qualification or relegation
1	Norwich City (C, P)	46	29	8	9	89	47	+42	95	Promotion to Football League Championship
2	Leeds United (P)	46	25	11	10	77	44	+33	86	Promotion to Football League Championship
3	Millwall (O, P)	46	24	13	9	76	44	+32	85	Qualification for League One play-offs
4	Charlton Athletic	46	23	15	8	71	48	+23	84	Qualification for League One play-offs
5	Swindon Town	46	22	16	8	73	57	+16	82	Qualification for League One play-offs
6	Huddersfield Town	46	23	11	12	82	56	+26	80	Qualification for League One play-offs
7	Southampton	46	23	14	9	85	47	+38	73 (Note: Southampton were given a ten-point deduction for breaching insolvency regulations, regarding their holding company. As they finished in the bottom three last season, the points deduction were applied in the 2009–10 season.)	
8	Colchester United	46	20	12	14	64	52	+12	72	
9	Brentford	46	14	20	12	55	52	+3	62	
10	Walsall	46	16	14	16	60	63	−3	62	
11	Bristol Rovers	46	19	5	22	59	70	−11	62	
12	Milton Keynes Dons	46	17	9	20	60	68	−8	60	
13	Brighton & Hove Albion	46	15	14	17	56	60	−4	59	
14	Carlisle United	46	15	13	18	63	66	−3	58	
15	Yeovil Town	46	13	14	19	55	59	−4	53	
16	Oldham Athletic	46	13	13	20	39	57	−18	52	
17	Leyton Orient	46	13	12	21	53	63	−10	51	
18	Exeter City	46	11	18	17	48	60	−12	51	
19	Tranmere Rovers	46	14	9	23	45	72	−27	51	
20	Hartlepool United	46	14	11	21	59	67	−8	50 (Note: Hartlepool deducted 3 points for fielding an ineligible player.)	
21	Gillingham (R)	46	12	14	20	48	64	−16	50	Relegation to Football League Two
22	Wycombe Wanderers (R)	46	10	15	21	56	76	−20	45	Relegation to Football League Two
23	Southend United (R)	46	10	13	23	51	72	−21	43	Relegation to Football League Two
24	Stockport County (R)	46	5	10	31	35	95	−60	25	Relegation to Football League Two

Source: The Football League
Rules for classification: 1) points; 2) goal difference; 3) number of goals scored.
(C) Champions; (O) Play-off winners; (P) Promoted; (R) Relegated

=== Play-offs ===
Semi-finals
6	Huddersfield Town	0	0	0
3	Millwall	0	2	2
5	Swindon Town (p)	2	1	3
4	Charlton Athletic	1	2	3

Final at Wembley
3	Millwall	1
5	Swindon Town	0

=== First leg ===
14 May 2010
19:45 BST

Swindon Town	2–1	Charlton Athletic
Austin 52'; Ward 60'	(Report)	65' Burton

The County Ground, Swindon
Attendance: 13,560
Referee: James Linington

15 May 2010
12:15 BST

Huddersfield Town	0–0	Millwall
	(Report)

Galpharm Stadium, Huddersfield
Attendance: 14,654
Referee: Darren Deadman

=== Second leg ===
17 May 2010
19:45 BST

Charlton Athletic	2 – 1 (a.e.t.)	Swindon Town
Ferry 27' (o.g.); Mooney 45+3'; Miguel Llera (red card) 90+3'	(Report)	(red card) 67' Greer; 74' Ward
Penalties
Burton (penalty scored); Bailey (penalty missed); Forster (penalty scored); Dailly (penalty scored); Richardson (penalty scored)	4–5	(penalty scored) McGovern; (penalty scored) Austin; (penalty scored) Amankwaah; (penalty scored) Ward; (penalty scored) Darby

The Valley, London
Attendance: 21,521
Referee: Neil Swarbrick

Charlton Athletic 3–3 Swindon Town on aggregate. Swindon Town win 5–4 on penalties.

18 May 2010
19:45 BST

Millwall	2–0	Huddersfield Town
Morison 23'; Robinson 82'	(Report)

The Den, London
Attendance: 15,463
Referee: Tony Bates

Millwall win 2–0 on aggregate.

=== Final ===
29 May 2010
15:00 BST

Millwall	1–0	Swindon Town
Robinson 39'	(Report)

Wembley Stadium, London
Attendance: 73,108
Referee: Colin Webster

Millwall are promoted to the Football League Championship

=== Results ===
Home \ Away	BRE	B&HA	BRR	CRL	CHA	COL	EXE	GIL	HAR	HUD	LEE	LEY	MIL	MKD	NWC	OLD	SOU	STD	STP	SWI	TRA	WAL	WYC	YEO
Brentford		0–0	1–3	3–1	1–1	1–0	0–0	4–0	0–0	3–0	0–0	1–0	2–2	3–3	2–1	1–1	1–1	2–1	2–0	2–3	2–1	1–1	1–1	1–1
Brighton & Hove Albion	3–0		2–1	1–2	0–2	1–2	2–0	2–0	3–3	0–0	0–3	0–0	0–1	0–1	1–2	0–2	2–2	2–3	2–4	0–1	3–0	0–1	1–0	1–0
Bristol Rovers	0–0	1–1		3–2	2–1	3–2	1–0	2–1	2–0	1–0	0–4	1–2	2–0	1–0	0–3	1–0	1–5	4–3	1–0	3–0	0–0	0–1	2–3	1–2
Carlisle United	1–3	0–2	3–1		3–1	2–1	0–1	2–0	3–2	1–2	1–3	2–2	1–3	5–0	0–1	1–2	1–1	2–1	0–0	0–1	3–0	1–1	1–0	1–0
Charlton Athletic	2–0	1–2	4–2	1–0		1–0	2–1	2–2	2–1	2–1	1–0	0–1	4–4	5–1	0–1	0–0	1–1	1–0	2–0	2–2	1–1	2–0	3–2	2–0
Colchester United	3–3	0–0	1–0	2–1	3–0		2–2	2–1	2–0	1–0	1–2	1–0	1–2	2–0	0–5	1–0	2–1	2–0	2–0	3–0	1–1	2–1	1–1	2–1
Exeter City	3–0	0–1	1–0	2–3	1–1	2–0		1–1	3–1	2–1	2–0	0–0	1–1	1–2	1–1	1–1	1–1	1–0	0–1	1–1	2–1	2–1	1–1	1–1
Gillingham	0–1	1–1	1–0	0–0	1–1	0–0	3–0		0–1	2–0	3–2	1–1	2–0	2–2	1–1	1–0	2–1	3–0	3–1	5–0	0–1	0–0	3–2	1–0
Hartlepool United	0–0	2–0	1–2	4–1	0–2	3–1	1–1	1–1		0–2	2–2	1–0	3–0	0–5	0–2	2–1	1–3	3–0	3–0	0–1	1–0	3–0	1–1	1–1
Huddersfield Town	0–0	7–1	0–0	1–1	1–1	2–1	4–0	2–1	2–1		2–2	4–0	1–0	1–0	1–3	2–0	3–1	2–1	0–0	2–2	3–3	4–3	6–0	2–1
Leeds United	1–1	1–1	2–1	1–1	0–0	2–0	2–1	4–1	3–1	2–2		1–0	0–2	4–1	2–1	2–0	1–0	2–0	2–0	0–3	3–0	1–2	1–1	4–0
Leyton Orient	2–1	1–1	5–0	2–2	1–2	0–1	1–1	3–1	1–3	0–2	1–1		1–0	1–2	2–1	1–2	2–2	1–2	2–0	0–0	2–1	2–0	2–0	2–0
Millwall	1–1	1–1	2–0	0–0	4–0	2–1	1–0	4–0	1–0	3–1	2–1	2–1		3–2	2–1	2–0	1–1	2–0	5–0	3–2	5–0	2–1	0–2	0–0
Milton Keynes Dons	0–1	0–0	2–1	3–4	0–1	2–1	1–1	2–0	0–0	2–3	0–1	1–0	1–3		2–1	0–0	0–3	3–1	4–1	2–1	1–0	1–0	2–3	2–2
Norwich City	1–0	4–1	5–1	0–2	2–2	1–7	3–1	2–0	2–1	3–0	1–0	4–0	2–0	1–1		2–0	0–2	2–1	2–1	1–0	2–0	0–0	5–2	3–0
Oldham Athletic	2–3	0–2	2–1	2–0	0–2	2–2	2–0	1–0	0–3	0–1	0–2	2–0	0–1	2–1	0–1		1–3	2–2	0–0	2–2	0–0	1–0	2–2	0–0
Southampton	1–1	1–3	2–3	3–2	1–0	0–0	3–1	4–1	3–2	5–0	1–0	2–1	1–1	3–1	2–2	0–0		3–1	2–0	0–1	3–0	5–1	1–0	2–0
Southend United	2–2	0–1	2–1	2–2	1–2	1–2	0–0	1–0	3–2	2–2	0–0	3–0	0–0	2–1	0–3	0–1	1–3		2–1	2–2	1–1	3–0	1–1	0–0
Stockport County	0–1	1–1	0–2	1–2	1–2	2–2	1–3	0–0	2–2	0–6	2–4	2–1	0–4	1–3	1–3	0–1	1–1	0–2		0–1	0–3	1–1	4–3	1–3
Swindon Town	3–2	2–1	0–4	2–0	1–1	1–1	1–1	3–1	0–2	2–1	3–0	3–2	1–1	0–0	1–1	4–2	1–0	2–1	4–1		3–0	1–1	1–1	3–1
Tranmere Rovers	1–0	2–1	2–0	0–0	0–4	1–1	3–1	4–2	0–0	0–2	1–4	2–1	2–0	0–1	3–1	0–1	2–1	2–0	0–1	1–4		2–3	0–3	2–1
Walsall	2–1	1–2	0–0	2–2	1–1	1–0	3–0	0–0	3–1	2–1	1–2	2–2	2–2	2–1	1–2	3–0	1–3	2–2	2–0	1–1	2–1		2–1	0–1
Wycombe Wanderers	1–0	2–5	2–1	0–0	1–2	1–1	2–2	3–0	2–0	1–2	0–1	0–1	1–0	0–1	0–1	2–2	0–0	1–1	2–1	2–2	0–1	2–3		1–4
Yeovil Town	2–0	2–2	0–3	3–1	1–1	0–1	2–1	0–0	4–0	0–1	1–2	3–3	1–1	1–0	3–3	3–0	0–1	1–0	2–2	0–1	2–0	1–3	4–0	

Source: The Football League
Legend: Blue = home team win; Yellow = draw; Red = away team win.

=== Managerial changes ===
Team	Outgoing manager	Manner of departure	Date of vacancy	Replaced by	Date of appointment	Position in table
Tranmere Rovers	Ronnie Moore	Sacked	5 June 2009	John Barnes	21 May 2009	Pre-season
Milton Keynes Dons	Roberto Di Matteo	Signed by West Brom	30 June 2009	Paul Ince	3 July 2009	Pre-season
Stockport County	Jim Gannon	Released, Consequently, Joined Motherwell	6 May 2009	Gary Ablett	8 July 2009	Pre-season
Southampton	Mark Wotte	Sacked	9 July 2009	Alan Pardew	17 July 2009	Pre-season
Norwich City	Bryan Gunn	Sacked	14 August 2009	Paul Lambert	18 August 2009	22nd
Colchester United	Paul Lambert	Signed by Norwich City	18 August 2009	Aidy Boothroyd	2 September 2009	1st
Tranmere Rovers	John Barnes	Sacked	9 October 2009	Les Parry	16 December 2009	22nd
Wycombe Wanderers	Peter Taylor	Mutual Consent	10 October 2009	Gary Waddock	13 October 2009	23rd
Brighton & Hove Albion	Russell Slade	Sacked	1 November 2009	Gustavo Poyet	10 November 2009	20th
Leyton Orient	Geraint Williams	Sacked	3 April 2010	Russell Slade	5 April 2010	19th
Oldham Athletic	Dave Penney	Sacked	6 May 2010	Paul Dickov	9 June 2010	17th
Gillingham	Mark Stimson	Mutual Consent	10 May 2010	Andy Hessenthaler	22 May 2010	21st
Milton Keynes Dons	Paul Ince	Sacked	10 May 2010	Karl Robinson	10 May 2010	12th
Colchester United	Aidy Boothroyd	Signed by Coventry City	22 May 2010	John Ward	31 May 2010	8th

== League Two ==
=== Table ===
Pos	Team	Pld	W	D	L	GF	GA	GD	Pts	Promotion, qualification or relegation
1	Notts County (C, P)	46	27	12	7	96	31	+65	93	Promotion to Football League One
2	Bournemouth (P)	46	25	8	13	61	44	+17	83	Promotion to Football League One
3	Rochdale (P)	46	25	7	14	82	48	+34	82	Promotion to Football League One
4	Morecambe	46	20	13	13	73	64	+9	73	Qualification to League Two play-offs
5	Rotherham United	46	21	10	15	55	52	+3	73	Qualification to League Two play-offs
6	Aldershot Town	46	20	12	14	69	56	+13	72	Qualification to League Two play-offs
7	Dagenham & Redbridge (O, P)	46	20	12	14	69	58	+11	72	Qualification to League Two play-offs
8	Chesterfield	46	21	7	18	61	62	−1	70	
9	Bury	46	19	12	15	54	59	−5	69	
10	Port Vale	46	17	17	12	61	50	+11	68	
11	Northampton Town	46	18	13	15	62	53	+9	67	
12	Shrewsbury Town	46	17	12	17	55	54	+1	63	
13	Burton Albion	46	17	11	18	71	71	0	62	
14	Bradford City	46	16	14	16	59	62	−3	62	
15	Accrington Stanley	46	18	7	21	62	74	−12	61	
16	Hereford United	46	17	8	21	54	65	−11	59	
17	Torquay United	46	14	15	17	64	55	+9	57	
18	Crewe Alexandra	46	15	10	21	68	73	−5	55	
19	Macclesfield Town	46	12	18	16	49	58	−9	54	
20	Lincoln City	46	13	11	22	42	65	−23	50	
21	Barnet	46	12	12	22	47	63	−16	48	
22	Cheltenham Town	46	10	18	18	54	71	−17	48	
23	Grimsby Town (R)	46	9	17	20	45	71	−26	44	Relegation to Conference National
24	Darlington (R)	46	8	6	32	33	87	−54	30	Relegation to Conference National

Updated to match(es) played on unknown. Source: football-league.co.uk
(C) Champions; (O) Play-off winners; (P) Promoted; (R) Relegated

=== Play-offs ===
Semi-finals
7	Dagenham & Redbridge	6	1	7
4	Morecambe	0	2	2
6	Aldershot Town	0	0	0
5	Rotherham United	1	2	3

Final at Wembley
7	Dagenham & Redbridge	3
5	Rotherham United	2

=== First leg ===
15 May 2010
18:00 BST

Aldershot Town	0–1	Rotherham United
	(Report)	Le Fondre 88'

The EBB Stadium, Aldershot
Attendance: 5,470
Referee: Andy D'Urso

16 May 2010
13:30 BST

Dagenham & Redbridge	6–0	Morecambe
Benson 4', 66'; Scott 35', 48', 54', 69'	(Report)

Victoria Road, London
Attendance: 4,566
Referee: Colin Webster

=== Second leg ===
19 May 2010
19:45 BST

Rotherham United	2–0	Aldershot Town
Le Fondre 43'; Ellison 68'	(Report)

Don Valley Stadium, Sheffield
Attendance: 7,082
Referee: F Graham

Rotherham United win 3–0 on aggregate.

20 May 2010
19:45 BST

Morecambe	2–1	Dagenham & Redbridge
Duffy 81'; David Artell 90+1'	(Report)	Benson 85'

Christie Park, Morecambe
Attendance: 4,972
Referee: E Ilderton

Dagenham & Redbridge win 7–2 on aggregate.

=== Final ===
30 May 2010
15:00 BST

Dagenham & Redbridge	3–2	Rotherham United
Benson 38'; Green 56'; Nurse 70'	(Report)	Taylor 39', 61'

Wembley Stadium, London
Attendance: 32,054
Referee: James Linington

Dagenham & Redbridge are promoted to Football League One.

=== Results ===
Home \ Away	ACC	ALD	BAR	BOU	BRA	BRT	BRY	CHL	CHF	CRE	D&R	DAR	GRI	HER	LIN	MAC	MOR	NOR	NTC	PTV	ROC	ROT	SHR	TOR
Accrington Stanley		2–1	1–0	0–1	2–0	0–2	2–4	4–0	2–0	5–3	0–1	2–1	2–3	1–2	1–0	1–1	3–2	0–3	0–3	1–2	2–4	2–1	1–3	4–2
Aldershot Town	3–1		4–0	2–1	1–0	0–2	2–3	4–1	1–0	1–1	2–3	3–1	1–1	2–2	3–1	0–0	4–1	2–1	1–1	1–1	1–1	3–0	2–0	0–2
Barnet	1–2	3–0		1–1	2–2	1–1	0–0	1–1	3–1	1–2	2–0	3–0	3–0	0–0	1–2	1–2	2–0	0–0	1–0	0–0	1–0	0–1	2–2	1–1
Bournemouth	2–0	1–0	3–0		1–0	1–0	1–2	0–0	1–2	1–0	0–0	2–0	3–1	2–1	3–1	1–1	1–0	0–2	2–1	4–0	0–4	1–0	1–0	2–1
Bradford City	1–1	2–1	2–1	1–1		1–1	0–1	1–1	3–0	2–3	3–3	1–0	0–0	1–0	0–2	1–2	2–0	2–0	0–0	0–0	0–3	2–4	1–3	2–0
Burton Albion	0–2	6–1	2–0	0–2	1–1		0–0	5–6	2–2	1–2	0–1	1–2	3–0	3–2	1–0	1–1	5–2	3–2	1–4	1–0	1–0	0–1	1–1	0–2
Bury	0–2	1–2	2–0	0–3	2–1	3–0		0–1	2–1	3–0	0–0	1–1	0–1	1–0	2–0	2–1	0–0	2–2	3–3	1–1	1–0	2–1	1–0	0–3
Cheltenham Town	1–1	1–2	5–1	0–1	4–5	0–1	5–2		0–1	0–4	1–1	3–3	2–1	0–1	1–0	1–2	2–0	2–2	1–1	1–1	1–4	1–1	1–2	1–1
Chesterfield	1–0	0–1	1–0	2–1	1–1	5–2	1–0	1–0		2–3	2–2	5–2	3–2	1–2	2–1	4–1	1–1	1–0	2–1	0–5	2–0	0–1	0–1	1–0
Crewe Alexandra	5–1	1–2	2–2	1–2	0–1	2–1	2–3	1–2	0–1		1–2	3–0	4–2	1–0	0–0	2–1	1–2	3–2	0–1	1–2	2–2	2–3	0–3	1–1
Dagenham & Redbridge	3–1	2–5	4–1	1–0	2–1	2–1	3–1	0–2	2–1	2–0		2–0	2–0	2–1	3–0	3–1	1–1	0–1	0–3	1–1	1–2	0–1	5–0	5–3
Darlington	0–0	1–2	1–2	0–2	0–1	1–0	0–1	1–1	2–3	0–1	0–2		0–2	0–1	1–1	0–1	0–4	1–2	0–5	1–3	0–2	2–0	2–1	1–3
Grimsby Town	2–2	1–2	2–0	3–2	0–3	1–2	1–1	0–0	2–2	0–4	1–1	1–1		1–0	2–2	1–1	1–1	1–2	0–1	1–2	0–2	1–2	3–0	0–3
Hereford United	2–0	2–0	2–1	2–1	2–0	3–4	1–3	1–1	1–0	1–1	1–1	2–1	0–1		2–0	0–2	0–1	0–2	0–2	2–2	2–1	3–0	2–1	1–0
Lincoln City	2–1	1–0	1–0	2–1	2–1	0–2	1–0	1–1	2–1	1–1	1–1	3–0	0–0	3–1		0–0	1–3	1–1	0–3	1–2	1–3	1–2	0–2	0–0
Macclesfield Town	0–0	1–1	1–1	1–2	2–2	1–1	2–0	1–0	2–0	4–1	2–2	0–2	0–0	3–1	0–1		2–2	0–2	0–4	2–0	0–1	1–3	0–1	2–1
Morecambe	1–2	1–0	2–1	5–0	0–0	3–2	3–0	1–0	0–1	4–3	1–0	2–0	1–1	2–2	3–1	2–2		2–4	2–1	1–0	3–3	2–0	1–1	2–0
Northampton Town	4–0	0–3	1–3	2–0	2–2	1–1	1–1	2–1	0–0	2–2	1–0	2–0	0–0	1–3	1–0	0–0	2–0		0–1	1–1	1–2	3–1	2–0	0–0
Notts County	1–2	0–0	2–0	2–2	5–0	1–1	5–0	5–0	1–0	2–0	3–0	4–0	1–1	5–0	3–1	1–0	4–1	5–2		3–1	1–0	1–0	1–1	2–2
Port Vale	2–2	1–1	0–2	0–0	2–1	3–1	0–1	1–1	1–2	0–1	3–1	1–0	4–0	2–0	4–0	0–0	0–2	1–3	2–1		1–1	1–2	1–1	2–2
Rochdale	1–2	1–0	2–1	0–0	1–3	1–2	3–0	0–1	2–3	2–0	3–1	0–1	4–1	4–1	1–1	3–0	4–1	1–0	2–1	0–0		4–0	4–0	2–1
Rotherham United	1–0	0–0	3–0	1–3	1–2	2–2	1–0	0–0	3–1	0–0	2–0	1–2	2–1	1–1	2–0	3–1	0–0	1–0	0–0	1–2	2–1		1–1	1–1
Shrewsbury Town	0–1	3–1	2–0	1–0	1–2	3–1	1–1	0–0	1–1	2–0	2–1	0–2	0–0	3–1	1–0	2–2	2–3	3–0	0–1	0–1	0–1	2–0		1–1
Torquay United	2–1	1–1	0–1	1–2	1–2	2–3	1–1	3–0	2–0	1–1	0–0	5–0	0–2	1–0	2–3	1–0	2–2	1–0	0–0	1–2	5–0	0–2	2–1	

Source: The Football League
Legend: Blue = home team win; Yellow = draw; Red = away team win.

=== Managerial changes ===
Team	Outgoing manager	Manner of departure	Date of vacancy	Replaced by	Date of appointment	Position in table
Burton Albion	Roy McFarland	Resigned	18 May 2009	Paul Peschisolido	18 May 2009	Pre-season
Darlington	Dave Penney	Signed by Oldham Athletic	30 April 2009	Colin Todd	20 May 2009	Pre-season
Port Vale	Dean Glover	Sacked	21 May 2009	Micky Adams	5 June 2009	Pre-season
Chesterfield	Lee Richardson	End of Contract	6 May 2009	John Sheridan	9 June 2009	Pre-season
Lincoln City	Peter Jackson	Sacked	2 September 2009	Chris Sutton	28 September 2009	17th
Northampton Town	Stuart Gray	Sacked	8 September 2009	Ian Sampson	5 October 2009	16th
Rotherham United	Mark Robins	Signed by Barnsley	9 September 2009	Ronnie Moore	24 September 2009	1st
Darlington	Colin Todd	Mutual Consent	26 September 2009	Steve Staunton	5 October 2009	24th
Crewe Alexandra	Guðjón Þórðarson	Sacked	2 October 2009	Dario Gradi	2 October 2009	14th
Notts County	Ian McParland	Sacked	12 October 2009	Hans Backe	27 October 2009	5th
Aldershot Town	Gary Waddock	Signed by Wycombe Wanderers	13 October 2009	Kevin Dillon	9 November 2009	6th
Grimsby Town	Mike Newell	Sacked	18 October 2009	Neil Woods	23 November 2009	23rd
Cheltenham Town	Martin Allen	Mutual Consent	11 December 2009	Mark Yates	22 December 2009	20th
Notts County	Hans Backe	Resigned	15 December 2009	Steve Cotterill	23 February 2010	6th
Bradford City	Stuart McCall	Resigned	8 February 2010	Peter Taylor	17 February 2010	16th
Macclesfield Town	Keith Alexander	Death	3 March 2010	Gary Simpson	14 April 2010	21st
Darlington	Steve Staunton	Sacked	22 March 2010	Simon Davey	5 April 2010	24th
Barnet	Ian Hendon	Sacked	28 April 2010	Mark Stimson	1 June 2010	22nd
Shrewsbury Town	Paul Simpson	Sacked	30 April 2010	Graham Turner	11 June 2010	12th
Notts County	Steve Cotterill	End of Contract	27 May 2010	Craig Short	6 June 2010	1st
