= Jimmy Poxton =

English footballer

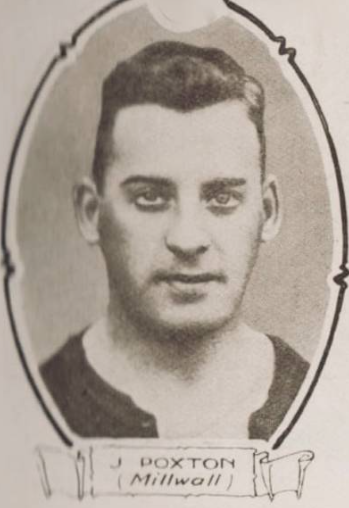

Personal information
- Full name: James Poxton
- Date of birth: 2 February 1903
- Place of birth: Staveley, Derbyshire, England
- Date of death: 14 December 1971 (aged 68)
- Place of death: Walsall, Staffordshire, England
- Position: Outside left

Senior career*
Years	Team	Apps	(Gls)
1920s-1927	West Bromwich Albion		
1927–1929	Gillingham		
1929–1933	Millwall		
- Watford
- * Club domestic league appearances and goals

James Poxton (2 February 1903 – 14 December 1971) was an English professional footballer of the 1920s and 1930s. Born in Staveley, he joined Gillingham from West Bromwich Albion in 1928 and went on to make 43 appearances for the club in The Football League. He left to join Millwall in 1929. He subsequently played for Watford – predominantly at outside left – and Walsall.

== Personal life ==
James Poxton was born on 2 February 1903 in the Poolsbrook neighbourhood of Staveley, Derbyshire to Henry Poxton and Caroline Hartshorn, and was one of 15 children.
