= List of EFL League One clubs =

The following is a list of clubs who have played in the English Football League One at any time since its formation in 2004 to the current season.

== Table ==
EFL League One teams playing in the 2026–27 season are indicated in bold. If the longest spell is the current spell, this is indicated in bold, and if the highest finish is that of the most recent season, this is also in bold. Teams in italic no longer exist in the legal form they competed as in League One. A total of 80 teams have played in League One.

All statistics here refer to time in EFL League One only, with the exception of 'Most recent finish' which refers to all levels of play, and 'Last promotion' which refers to the club's last promotion from the fourth tier of English football.

Club	Town or city	Total seasons	Total spells	Longest spell	Promotion to league	Promotion from league	Relegation to league	Relegation from league	Years	Most recent finish	Highest finish
Accrington Stanley	Accrington	5	1	5	2017–18	Never Promoted	Never Relegated	2022–23	2018–2023	16th League Two	11th
**Barnsley**	Barnsley	10	4	**5**	1980–81	2018–19	2021–22	Never Relegated	2004–2006; 2014–2016; 2018–2019; **2022–**	15th	2nd
Birmingham City	Birmingham	1	1	1	Never Promoted	2024–25	2023–24	Never Relegated	2024–2025	10th Championship	1st
Blackburn Rovers	Blackburn	1	1	1	Never Promoted	2017–18	2016–17	Never Relegated	2017–2018	20th Championship	2nd
**Blackpool**	Blackpool	12	4	**4**	2016–17	2020–21	2022–23	2015–16	2004–2007; 2015–2016; 2017–2021; **2023–**	13th	3rd
Bolton Wanderers	Bolton	7	3	5	2020–21	2025–26	2018–19	2019–20	2016–2017; 2019–2020; 2021–2026	5th (promoted)	2nd
Bournemouth	Bournemouth	7	2	4	2009–10	2012–13	Never Relegated	2007–08	2004–2008; 2010–2013	6th Premier League	2nd
**Bradford City**	Bradford	11	3	6	2024–25	Never Promoted	2003–04	2018–19	2004–2007; 2013–2019; **2025–**	4th	**4th**
Brentford	London	8	2	5	2008–09	2013–14	Never Relegated	2006–07	2004–2007; 2009–2014	9th Premier League	2nd
Brighton & Hove Albion	Brighton	5	1	5	2000–01	2010–11	2005–06	Never Relegated	2006–2011	8th Premier League	1st
Bristol City	Bristol	5	2	3	1983–84	2014–15	1998–99	2012–13	2004–2007; 2013–2015	12th Championship	2nd
Bristol Rovers	Bristol	12	3	5	2021–22	Never Promoted	Never Relegated	2024–25	2007–2011; 2016–2021; 2022–2025	14th League Two	10th
**Bromley**	London	1	1	**1**	2025–26	Never Promoted	Never Relegated	Never Relegated	**2026–**	1st (promoted); League Two	—N/a
**Burton Albion**	Burton upon Trent	10	2	**9**	2014–15	2015–16	2017–18	Never Relegated	2015–2016; **2018–**	17th	2nd
Bury	Bury	6	3	3	2018–19	Never Promoted	Never Relegated	2019–20 (Note: Bury were expelled from the EFL during the 2019–20 season following financial difficulties.)	2011–2013; 2015–2018; 2019	1st (promoted); Northern Premier League Division One West	14th
Cardiff City	Cardiff	1	1	1	2000–01	2025–26	2024–25	Never Relegated	2025–2026	2nd (promoted)	**2nd**
Carlisle United	Carlisle	9	2	8	2022–23	Never Promoted	Never Relegated	2023–24	2006–2014; 2023–2024	3rd National League	4th
**Cambridge United**	Cambridge	6	2	5	2025–26	Never Promoted	Never Relegated	2024–25	2021–2025; **2026–**	3rd (promoted); League Two	14th
Charlton Athletic	London	11	3	5	Never Promoted	2024–25	2019–20	Never Relegated	2009–2012; 2016–2019; 2020–2025	19th Championship	1st
Cheltenham Town	Cheltenham	6	2	3	2020–21	Never Promoted	Never Relegated	2023–24	2006–2009; 2021–2024	18th League Two	17th
Chesterfield	Chesterfield	6	3	3	2013–14	Never Promoted	Never Relegated	2016–17	2004–2007; 2011–2012; 2014–2017	6th League Two	16th
Colchester United	Colchester	10	2	8	1997–98	2005–06	2007–08	2015–16	2004–2006; 2008–2016	12th League Two	2nd
Coventry City	Coventry	7	2	5	2017–18	2019–20	2011–12	2016–17	2012–2017; 2018–2020	1st (promoted); Championship	1st
Crawley Town	Crawley	4	2	3	2023–24	Never Promoted	Never Relegated	2024–25	2012–2015; 2024–2025	22nd League Two	10th
Crewe Alexandra	Crewe	9	3	4	2019–20	Never Promoted	2005–06	2021–22	2006–2009; 2012–2016; 2020–2022	11th League Two	13th
Dagenham & Redbridge	London	1	1	1	2009–10	Never Promoted	Never Relegated	2010–11	2010–2011	13th National League South	21st
Derby County	Derby	2	1	2	Never Promoted	2023–24	2021–22	Never Relegated	2022–2024	8th Championship	2nd
**Doncaster Rovers**	Doncaster	14	5	5	2024–25	2012–13	2013–14	2021–22	2004–2008; 2012–2013; 2014–2016; 2017–2022; **2025–**	14th	1st
Exeter City	Exeter	7	2	4	2021–22	Never Promoted	Never Relegated	2025–26	2009–2012; 2022–2026	21st (relegated)	8th
Fleetwood Town	Fleetwood	10	1	10	2013–14	Never Promoted	Never Relegated	2023–24	2014–2024	15th League Two	4th
Forest Green Rovers	Nailsworth	1	1	1	2021–22	Never Promoted	Never Relegated	2022–23	2022–2023	7th National League	24th
Gillingham	Gillingham	13	3	9	2012–13	Never Promoted	2004–05	2021–22	2005–2008; 2009–2010; 2013–2022	17th League Two	9th
Hartlepool United	Hartlepool	8	2	6	2006–07	Never Promoted	Never Relegated	2012–13	2004–2006; 2007–2013	9th National League	6th
Hereford United	Hereford	1	1	1	2007–08	Never Promoted	Never Relegated	2008–09	2008–2009	Defunct (2014–15)	24th
**Huddersfield Town**	Huddersfield	11	2	8	2003–04	2011–12	2023–24	Never Relegated	2004–2012; **2024–**	9th	4th
Hull City	Kingston upon Hull	2	2	1	2003–04	2020–21	2019–20	Never Relegated	2004–2005; 2020–2021	6th (promoted); Championship	1st
Ipswich Town	Ipswich	4	1	4	Never Promoted	2022–23	2018–19	Never Relegated	2019–2023	2nd (promoted); Championship	2nd
Leeds United	Leeds	3	1	3	Never Promoted	2009–10	2006–07	Never Relegated	2007–2010	14th Premier League	2nd
**Leicester City**	Leicester	2	2	**1**	Never Promoted	2008–09	2025–26	Never Relegated	2008–2009; **2026–**	23rd (relegated); Championship	1st
**Leyton Orient**	London	13	2	9	2022–23	Never Promoted	Never Relegated	2014–15	2006–2015; **2023–**	20th	3rd
Lincoln City	Lincoln	7	1	7	2018–19	2025–26	Never Relegated	Never Relegated	2019–2026	1st (promoted)	**1st**
**Luton Town**	Luton	5	4	**2**	2017–18	2018–19	2024–25	2007–08	2004–2005; 2007–2008; 2018–2019; **2025–**	7th	1st
**Mansfield Town**	Mansfield	3	1	**3**	2023–24	Never Promoted	Never Relegated	Never Relegated	**2024–**	10th	**17th**
Millwall	London	6	2	4	1964–65	2016–17	2014–15	Never Relegated	2006–2010; 2015–2017	3rd Championship	3rd
**Milton Keynes Dons**	Milton Keynes	16	5	7	2025–26	Never Promoted	2015–16	2022–23	2004–2006; 2008–2015; 2016–2018; 2019–2023; **2026–**	2nd (promoted); League Two	2nd
Morecambe	Morecambe	2	1	2	2020–21	Never Promoted	Never Relegated	2022–23	2021–2023	22nd (relegated); National League	19th
Northampton Town	Northampton	9	4	3	2022–23	Never Promoted	Never Relegated	2025–26	2006–2009; 2016–2018; 2020–2021; 2023–2026	24th (relegated)	9th
Norwich City	Norwich	1	1	1	Never Promoted	2009–10	2008–09	Never Relegated	2009–2010	9th Championship	1st
Nottingham Forest	Nottingham	3	1	3	Never Promoted	2007–08	2004–05	Never Relegated	2005–2008	16th Premier League	2nd
**Notts County**	Nottingham	6	2	5	2025–26	Never Promoted	Never Relegated	2014–15	2010–2015; **2026–**	5th (promoted); League Two	7th
Oldham Athletic	Oldham	14	1	14	1962–63	Never Promoted	1996–97	2017–18	2004–2018	10th League Two	6th
**Oxford United**	Oxford	9	2	8	2015–16	2023–24	2025–26	Never Relegated	2016–2024; **2026–**	22nd (relegated); Championship	4th
**Peterborough United**	Peterborough	16	5	8	2007–08	2020–21	2021–22	2004–05	2004–2005; 2008–2009; 2010–2011; 2013–2021; **2022–**	18th	2nd
**Plymouth Argyle**	Plymouth	8	4	3	2019–20	2022–23	2024–25	2018–19	2010–2011; 2017–2019; 2020–2023; **2025–**	8th	1st
Portsmouth	Portsmouth	8	2	7	2016–17	2023–24	2011–12	2012–13	2012–2013; 2017–2024	18th Championship	1st
Port Vale	Stoke-on-Trent	10	4	4	2024–25	Never Promoted	1999–2000	2025–26	2004–2008; 2013–2017; 2022–2024; 2025–2026	22nd (relegated)	9th
Preston North End	Preston	4	1	4	1995–96	2014–15	2010–11	Never Relegated	2011–2015	14th Championship	3rd
**Reading**	Reading	4	1	**4**	1983–84	Never Promoted	2022–23	Never Relegated	**2023–**	12th	7th
Rochdale	Rochdale	9	2	7	2013–14	Never Promoted	Never Relegated	2020–21	2010–2012; 2014–2021	2nd (promoted); National League	9th
Rotherham United	Rotherham	8	6	2	2012–13	2021–22	2023–24	2025–26	2005–2007; 2013–2014; 2017–2018; 2019–2020; 2021–2022; 2024–2026	23rd (relegated)	2nd
Scunthorpe United	Scunthorpe	10	4	5	2013–14	2008–09	2010–11	2018–19	2005–2007; 2008–2009; 2011–2013; 2014–2019	5th National League	1st
Sheffield United	Sheffield	6	1	6	1981–82	2016–17	2010–11	Never Relegated	2011–2017	13th Championship	1st
**Sheffield Wednesday**	Sheffield	6	4	2	Never Promoted	2022–23	2025–26	Never Relegated	2004–2005; 2010–2012; 2021–2023; **2026–**	24th (relegated); Championship	2nd
Shrewsbury Town	Shrewsbury	12	2	10	2014–15	Never Promoted	Never Relegated	2024–25	2012–2014; 2015–2025	19th League Two	3rd
Southampton	Southampton	2	1	2	Never Promoted	2010–11	2008–09	Never Relegated	2009–2011	4th Championship	2nd
Southend United	Southend-on-sea	9	3	5	2014–15	2005–06	2006–07	2019–20	2005–2006; 2007–2010; 2015–2020	6th National League	1st
**Stevenage**	Stevenage	7	2	**4**	2022–23	Never Promoted	Never Relegated	2013–14	2011–2014; **2023–**	6th	**6th**
**Stockport County**	Stockport	6	3	**3**	2023–24	Never Promoted	2001–02	2009–10	2004–2005; 2008–2010; **2024–**	3rd	3rd
Sunderland	Sunderland	4	1	4	Never Promoted	2021–22	2017–18	Never Relegated	2018–2022	7th Premier League	4th
Swansea City	Swansea, Wales	3	1	3	2004–05	2007–08	Never Relegated	Never Relegated	2005–2008	11th Championship	1st
Swindon Town	Swindon	12	4	5	2019–20	Never Promoted	1998–99	2020–21	2004–2006; 2007–2011; 2012–2017; 2020–2021	9th League Two	5th
Torquay United	Torquay	1	1	1	2003–04	Never Promoted	Never Relegated	2004–05	2004–2005	3rd National League South	21st
Tranmere Rovers	Tranmere	11	2	10	2018–19	Never Promoted	2000–01	2019–20	2004–2014; 2019–2020	21st League Two	3rd
Walsall	Walsall	13	2	11	2006–07	Never Promoted	2003–04	2018–19	2004–2006; 2007–2019	13th League Two	3rd
**Wigan Athletic**	Wigan	8	4	**4**	1996–97	2021–22	2022–23	Never Relegated	2015–2016; 2017–2018; 2020–2022; **2023–**	16th	1st
**AFC Wimbledon**	London	8	2	6	2024–25	Never Promoted	Never Relegated	2021–22	2016–2022; **2025–**	19th	15th
Wolverhampton Wanderers	Wolverhampton	1	1	1	1987–88	2013–14	2012–13	Never Relegated	2013–2014	20th (relegated); Premier League	1st
Wrexham	Wrexham, Wales	2	2	1	2023–24	2024–25	Never Relegated	2004–05	2004–2005; 2024–2025	7th Championship	2nd
**Wycombe Wanderers**	High Wycombe	10	4	**6**	2017–18	2019–20	2020–21	2011–12	2009–2010; 2011–2012; 2018–2020; **2021–**	11th	5th
Yeovil Town	Yeovil	9	2	8	2004–05	2012–13	2013–14	2014–15	2005–2013; 2014–2015	16th National League	4th

== Overview of clubs by season ==
Champions	Runners-up	Promoted via play-offs	Relegated

Club	04 05	05 06	06 07	07 08	08 09	09 10	10 11	11 12	12 13	13 14	14 15	15 16	16 17	17 18	18 19	19 20	20 21	21 22	22 23	23 24	24 25	25 26	26 27
Accrington Stanley															14	17	11	12	23				
Barnsley	13	5									11	6			2				4	6	12	15	
Birmingham City																					1		
Blackburn Rovers														2									
Blackpool	16	19	3									22		12	10	13	3			8	9	13	
Bolton Wanderers													2			23		9	5	3	8	5	
Bournemouth	8	17	19	21			6	11	2														
Bradford City	11	11	22							11	7	5	5	11	24							4	
Brentford	4	3	24			9	11	9	3	2													
Brighton & Hove Albion			18	7	16	13	1																
Bristol City	7	9	2							12	1												
Bristol Rovers				16	11	11	22						10	13	15	14	24		17	15	22		
Bromley																							
Burton Albion												2			9	12	16	16	15	20	20	17	
Bury								14	22			16	19	24		24							
Carlisle United			8	4	20	14	12	8	17	22										24			
Cambridge United																		14	20	18	23		
Cardiff City																						2	
Charlton Athletic						4	13	1					13	6	3		7	13	10	16	4		
Cheltenham Town			17	19	23													15	16	21			
Chesterfield	17	16	21					22			6	18	24										
Colchester United	15	2			12	8	10	10	20	16	19	23											
Coventry City									15	18	17	8	23		8	1							
Crawley Town									10	14	22										21		
Crewe Alexandra			13	20	22				13	19	20	24					12	24					
Dagenham & Redbridge							21																
Derby County																			7	2			
Doncaster Rovers	10	8	11	3					1		13	21		15	6	9	14	22				14	
Exeter City						18	8	23											14	13	16	21	
Fleetwood Town											10	19	4	14	11	6	15	20	13	22			
Forest Green Rovers																			24				
Gillingham		14	16	22		21				17	12	9	20	17	13	10	10	21					
Hartlepool United	6	21		15	19	20	16	13	23														
Hereford United					24																		
Huddersfield Town	9	4	15	10	9	6	3	4													10	9	
Hull City	2																1						
Ipswich Town																11	9	11	2				
Leeds United				5	4	2																	
Leicester City					1																		
Leyton Orient			20	14	14	17	7	20	7	3	23									11	6	20	
Lincoln City																16	5	17	11	7	11	1	
Luton Town	1			24											1							7	
Mansfield Town																					17	10	
Millwall			10	17	5	3						4	6										
Milton Keynes Dons	20	22			3	12	5	5	8	10	2		12	23		19	13	3	21				
Morecambe																		19	22				
Northampton Town			14	9	21								16	22			22			14	19	24	
Norwich City						1																	
Nottingham Forest		7	4	2																			
Notts County							19	7	12	20	21												
Oldham Athletic	19	10	6	8	10	16	17	16	19	15	15	17	17	21									
Oxford United													8	16	12	4	6	8	19	5			
Peterborough United	23				2		4			6	9	13	11	9	7	7	2		6	4	18	18	
Plymouth Argyle							23							7	21		18	7	1			8	
Port Vale	18	13	12	23						9	18	12	21						18	23		22	
Portsmouth									24					8	4	5	8	10	8	1			
Preston North End								15	14	5	3												
Reading																				17	7	12	
Rochdale							9	24			8	10	9	20	16	18	21						
Rotherham United		20	23							4				4		2		2			13	23	
Scunthorpe United		12	1		6			18	21		16	7	3	5	23								
Sheffield United								3	5	7	5	11	1										
Sheffield Wednesday	5						15	2										4	3				
Shrewsbury Town									16	23		20	18	3	18	15	17	18	12	19	24		
Southampton						7	2																
Southend United		1		6	8	23						14	7	10	19	22							
Stevenage								6	18	24										9	14	6	
Stockport County	24				18	24															3	3	
Sunderland															5	8	4	5					
Swansea City		6	7	1																			
Swindon Town	12	23		13	15	5	24		6	8	4	15	22				23						
Torquay United	21																						
Tranmere Rovers	3	18	9	11	7	19	18	12	11	21						21							
Walsall	14	24		12	13	10	20	19	9	13	14	3	14	19	22								
Wigan Athletic												1		1			20	1		12	15	16	
AFC Wimbledon													15	18	20	20	19	23				19	
Wolverhampton Wanderers										1													
Wrexham	22																				2		
Wycombe Wanderers						22		21							17	3		6	9	10	5	11	
Yeovil Town		15	5	18	17	15	14	17	4		24												
Club	04 05	05 06	06 07	07 08	08 09	09 10	10 11	11 12	12 13	13 14	14 15	15 16	16 17	17 18	18 19	19 20	20 21	21 22	22 23	23 24	24 25	25 26	26 27
