= 2026–27 EFL League One =

EFL League One
- Season: 2026–27
- Dates: 15 August 2026 – May 2027
- Matches: 163
- Goals: 460 (2.82 per match)
- Top goalscorer: Aaron Collins (13 goals)
- Biggest home win: Sheffield Wednesday 7–2 Bromley (29 August 2026); Reading 5–0 Mansfield Town (2 September 2026); Sheffield Wednesday 5–0 AFC Wimbledon (17 October 2026); Milton Keynes Dons 6–1 Doncaster Rovers (31 October 2026)
- Biggest away win: Bromley 0–5 Leyton Orient (1 September 2026)
- Highest scoring: Sheffield Wednesday 7–2 Bromley (29 August 2026)
- Longest winning run: 4 games Stockport County; Huddersfield Town; Luton Town; Milton Keynes Dons
- Longest unbeaten run: 10 games Oxford United
- Longest winless run: 9 games Barnsley
- Longest losing run: 4 games Notts County; Barnsley
- Highest attendance: 33,188; Sheffield Wednesday 0–1 Bradford City (20 August 2026)
- Lowest attendance: 2,733; Burton Albion 4–1 AFC Wimbledon (2 September 2026)
- All statistics correct as of 14 November 2026.

The 2026–27 EFL League One, referred to as the Sky Bet League One due to sponsorship reasons, is the 23rd season of the EFL League One under its current title, and the 35th season under its current league division format. The season began on 15 August 2026, and end in May 2027.

== Team changes ==
The following teams have changed division since the 2025–26 season:

=== To League One ===
Promoted from League Two

- Bromley
- Milton Keynes Dons
- Cambridge United
- Notts County

Relegated from the Championship

- Oxford United
- Leicester City
- Sheffield Wednesday

=== From League One ===
Promoted to the Championship

- Lincoln City
- Cardiff City
- Bolton Wanderers

Relegated to League Two

- Exeter City
- Rotherham United
- Port Vale
- Northampton Town

== Stadiums and locations ==
Locations of the 2026–27 EFL League One teams
Locations of 2026–27 EFL League One teams (Greater Manchester)
Greater London EFL League One football clubs

Note: Table lists in alphabetical order.

Team	Location	Stadium	Capacity
AFC Wimbledon	London (Wimbledon)	Plough Lane	9,215
Barnsley	Barnsley	Oakwell	23,287
Blackpool	Blackpool	Bloomfield Road	16,500
Bradford City	Bradford	Valley Parade	24,840
Bromley	London (Bromley)	Hayes Lane	6,100
Burton Albion	Burton upon Trent	Pirelli Stadium	6,912
Cambridge United	Cambridge	Abbey Stadium	7,937
Doncaster Rovers	Doncaster	Eco-Power Stadium	15,231
Huddersfield Town	Huddersfield	Kirklees Stadium	24,121
Leicester City	Leicester	King Power Stadium	32,259
Leyton Orient	London (Leyton)	Brisbane Road	9,271
Luton Town	Luton	Kenilworth Road	12,056
Mansfield Town	Mansfield	Field Mill	10,022
Milton Keynes Dons	Milton Keynes	Stadium MK	30,500
Notts County	Nottingham	Meadow Lane	19,841
Oxford United	Oxford	Kassam Stadium	12,500
Peterborough United	Peterborough	London Road Stadium	13,512
Plymouth Argyle	Plymouth	Home Park	17,900
Reading	Reading	Madejski Stadium	24,161
Sheffield Wednesday	Sheffield (Hillsborough)	Hillsborough Stadium	39,732
Stevenage	Stevenage	Broadhall Way	7,318
Stockport County	Stockport (Edgeley)	Edgeley Park	10,852
Wigan Athletic	Wigan	Brick Community Stadium	25,138
Wycombe Wanderers	High Wycombe	Adams Park	10,446

== Personnel and sponsoring ==
Team	Manager	Captain	Kit manufacturer	Shirt sponsor (chest)	Shirt sponsor (back)	Shirt sponsor (sleeve)	Shorts sponsor
AFC Wimbledon	(England) Johnnie Jackson	(Northern Ireland) Ryan Johnson	(Italy) Lotto	Football Manager	Togglit	Silvermere Golf Store	DFTBA
Barnsley	(Germany) Daniel Stendel	(Northern Ireland) Cameron McGeehan	(England) Oxen	TheInvestmentRoom	NParliament	Weston Park Cancer Charity	TheInvestmentRoom
Blackpool	TBC	(England) George Honeyman	(Germany) Puma	TreadTracker	Elite Competitions	None	None
Bradford City	(Northern Ireland) Michael Duff	(England) Antoni Sarcevic	(Italy) Macron	JCT600	Mbanq	Flamingo Land	Ko-Lee Noodles
Bromley	(England) Karl Robinson	(England) Omar Sowunmi	(Italy) Macron	LSP Renewables	Blue Security Systems	Brownhill Insurance Group	CJC
Burton Albion	(England) Gary Bowyer	(Jamaica) Curtis Tilt	(England) Admiral	FanEx	Russell Roof Tiles	Home & Trade Building Supplies	Hardy Signs
Cambridge United	(England) Neil Harris	(England) Dominic Ball	(England) Umbro	Brooks	The Hill Group	Majority Audio	Alan Boswell Group
Doncaster Rovers	(Northern Ireland) Grant McCann	(England) Owen Bailey	(England) Oxen	Pass Logistics	Stoneacre Motor Group	Taylor Stevenson	KFC
Huddersfield Town	(England) Martin Drury	(England) Ryan Ledson	(England) Castore	HEYDUDE	Utilita	Core Facility Services	Al-Murad Tiles
Leicester City	(Scotland) Russell Martin	None	(Germany) Adidas	Bossjob (Note: Leicester City's shirt sponsor was BC.GAME until 18 November 2026, when the deal was ended prematurely.)	Cromwell	Bia Saigon	None
Leyton Orient	(England) Richie Wellens	(Jamaica) Isaac Hayden	(Spain) Meyba	Eastdil Secured	Suits Me	Stadia Group	Quattro Plant
Luton Town	(England) Jack Wilshere	(Scotland) Kal Naismith	(England) Reflo	Capital Sky	Utilita	Switchshop	KDW Financial Planning
Mansfield Town	(England) Nigel Clough	(Republic of Ireland) Ryan Sweeney	(Italy) Errea	One Call Insurance	A. Wass Funeral Directors	Chalk Specialist Education Recruitment	A Woodland & Son Flooring Specialists
Milton Keynes Dons	(England) Paul Warne	(England) Alex Gilbey	(United States) Reebok	None	None	Visit Kuwait	None
Notts County	(Northern Ireland) Martin Paterson	(England) Matthew Palmer	(Germany) Puma	David James - The Estate Agent	Datagum	Workbox	The Good Sheet
Oxford United	(Wales) Aaron Ramsey	(England) Cameron Brannagan	(Italy) Macron	Baxi	None	Caprinos Pizza	None
Peterborough United	(Wales) Robbie Savage	(Northern Ireland) Carl Johnston	(Germany) Puma	Mick George	Princebuild	NextLevel Fibreoptics	Kings Power Solutions
Plymouth Argyle	(England) Tom Cleverley	(England) Joe Edwards	(Germany) Puma	Classic Builders	Vertu Motors	Fineline Group	DDF Fire
Reading	(England) Leam Richardson	(England) Lewis Wing	(Italy) Macron	Mr Vegas	Select Car Leasing	Barracuda Networks	Village Hotel Club
Sheffield Wednesday	(England) Dave Challinor	(Scotland) Liam Palmer	(England) Umbro	Fibrely	MrQ	Wolf Competitions	NOCO
Stevenage	(England) Alex Revell	(England) Carl Piergianni	(Germany) Puma	Xsolla	HG Group	Everyone Active	Lansmith Global Partners
Stockport County	(Scotland) Jimmy McNulty	(Northern Ireland) Oliver Norwood	(Germany) Puma	VITA	Pro Football Academy	GroFu	None
Wigan Athletic	(Scotland) Gary Caldwell	(England) Max Power	(Republic of Ireland) O'Neills	Smurfit Westrock	Greenmount Projects	3PL	FASE Group
Wycombe Wanderers	(England) Tom Hounsell	(Scotland) Jack Grimmer	(Denmark) Hummel	Origin Doors and Windows	Buckinghamshire New University	None	None

1. Leicester City's shirt sponsor was BC.GAME until 18 November 2026 when the deal was ended prematurely. Bossjob was announced as the new

== Managerial changes ==
Team	Outgoing manager	Manner of departure	Date of vacancy	Position in the table	Incoming manager	Date of appointment
Barnsley	(Republic of Ireland) Conor Hourihane	Mutual consent	2 May 2026	Pre-season	(Germany) Daniel Stendel	12 May 2026
Leicester City	(England) Gary Rowett	End of contract	2 May 2026	Pre-season	(Scotland) Russell Martin	15 June 2026
Huddersfield Town	(England) Liam Manning	Mutual consent	11 May 2026	Pre-season	(England) Martin Drury	27 May 2026
Stockport County	(England) Dave Challinor	Mutual consent	1 June 2026	Pre-season	(Scotland) Jimmy McNulty	5 June 2026
Oxford United	(England) Matt Bloomfield	Sacked	20 June 2026	Pre-season	(Wales) Aaron Ramsey	23 June 2026
Wycombe Wanderers	(Northern Ireland) Michael Duff	Sacked	8 September 2026	23rd	(England) Tom Hounsell (Note: Hounsell was appointed interim head coach on 9 September 2026, before being appointed permanently on 10 October 2026.)	9 September 2026
Peterborough United	(England) Luke Williams	Sacked	19 September 2026	23rd	(England) Ryan Harley (interim)	19 September 2026
Bradford City	(Scotland) Graham Alexander	Signed by Preston North End	28 September 2026	1st	(England) Mark Trueman & (Republic of Ireland) Colin Doyle (interim)	28 September 2026
Peterborough United	(England) Ryan Harley	End of interim spell	2 October 2026	22nd	(Wales) Robbie Savage	2 October 2026
Bradford City	(England) Mark Trueman & (Republic of Ireland) Colin Doyle	End of interim spell	6 October 2026	2nd	(Northern Ireland) Michael Duff	6 October 2026
Bromley	(England) Andy Woodman	Sacked	22 October 2026	23rd	(England) Byron Webster (interim)	22 October 2026
Sheffield Wednesday	(Denmark) Henrik Pedersen	Sacked	25 October 2026	8th	(England) Matt Hamshaw (interim)	25 October 2026
Sheffield Wednesday	(England) Matt Hamshaw	End of interim spell	1 November 2026	9th	(England) Dave Challinor	1 November 2026
Bromley	(England) Byron Webster	End of interim spell	5 November 2026	24th	(England) Karl Robinson	5 November 2026
Blackpool	(England) Ian Evatt	Sacked	19 November 2026	20th		

== League table ==
Pos	Team	Pld	W	D	L	GF	GA	GD	Pts	Promotion, qualification or relegation
1	Stockport County	16	10	2	4	32	15	+17	32	Promotion to EFL Championship
2	Huddersfield Town	15	8	5	2	28	13	+15	29	Promotion to EFL Championship
3	Oxford United	14	8	5	1	26	14	+12	29	Qualification for League One play-offs
4	Luton Town	15	8	3	4	29	22	+7	27	Qualification for League One play-offs
5	Sheffield Wednesday	15	7	5	3	27	15	+12	26	Qualification for League One play-offs
6	Bradford City	14	6	5	3	12	10	+2	23	Qualification for League One play-offs
7	Plymouth Argyle	16	7	2	7	21	24	−3	23	
8	Reading	16	6	4	6	26	19	+7	22	
9	Milton Keynes Dons	15	5	7	3	29	23	+6	22	
10	Leicester City	14	6	4	4	23	19	+4	22	
11	Cambridge United	15	5	6	4	21	24	−3	21	
12	Leyton Orient	14	6	2	6	23	15	+8	20	
13	Mansfield Town	14	5	5	4	21	19	+2	20	
14	Stevenage	13	5	4	4	18	13	+5	19	
15	Wycombe Wanderers	14	4	6	4	24	27	−3	18	
16	Burton Albion	16	4	5	7	21	29	−8	17	
17	Wigan Athletic	16	5	2	9	15	24	−9	17	
18	AFC Wimbledon	15	4	4	7	11	25	−14	16	
19	Notts County	13	3	5	5	13	15	−2	14	
20	Doncaster Rovers	14	3	4	7	16	24	−8	13	
21	Peterborough United	14	3	4	7	13	23	−10	13	Relegation to EFL League Two
22	Blackpool	14	3	3	8	18	24	−6	12	Relegation to EFL League Two
23	Bromley	14	3	3	8	14	33	−19	12	Relegation to EFL League Two
24	Barnsley	14	2	3	9	14	26	−12	9	Relegation to EFL League Two

Updated to match(es) played on 21 November 2026. Source: EFL Official Website
Rules for classification: 1) Points; 2) Goal difference; 3) Number of goals scored; 4) Head-to-head results; 5) Wins; 6) Away goals; 7) Penalty points (sec 9.5); 8) 12-point sending off offences

== Results ==
Home \ Away	WIM	BAR	BLP	BRA	BRM	BUR	CAM	DON	HUD	LEI	LEY	LUT	MAN	MKD	NCO	OXF	PET	PLY	REA	SHW	STE	STO	WIG	WYC
AFC Wimbledon	—		1–0					1–0					0–3	0–0					0–0				1–0	1–1
Barnsley		—	2–1		0–1		1–2			1–1						1–1				1–2	1–5			
Blackpool			—		2–2								1–4	2–0			4–0	2–4					1–2	1–1
Bradford City				—			1–2	2–2	0–3		0–0		1–0				2–0				2–0			
Bromley	0–2				—		1–1		2–1	0–4	0–5						1–1							
Burton Albion	4–1			0–0		—	2–2		1–3		2–1	1–2	2–2								1–1			
Cambridge United	1–1		1–0				—		1–2									2–3	2–1			0–3	3–2	2–2
Doncaster Rovers		0–0				1–0		—							1–1			2–3		2–0		0–2		
Huddersfield Town	3–0								—	0–1		1–1			1–1	3–1	4–1			2–2			2–1	
Leicester City						1–2		2–1		—						0–4	1–3	2–0			2–2		3–0	
Leyton Orient	4–1	1–3	2–0				3–0				—							0–2		1–2	1–0			2–3
Luton Town		2–1		0–1				3–1		2–1	1–1	—			2–2							2–0		
Mansfield Town					2–1			2–1	0–0			5–2	—	1–1	0–2	1–1								
Milton Keynes Dons	a				4–1	6–2		6–1	1–1	0–0		2–1		—			1–1		1–5					
Notts County				0–1		2–1				1–1					—	1–2				2–0	0–1	1–1		
Oxford United				0–0		3–0	1–1							2–2		—			2–0			1–0	2–1	4–3
Peterborough United						2–2		0–2				0–2	2–1				—			1–2	0–0			
Plymouth Argyle	2–1	3–0		2–0		0–1			0–2								0–2	—	0–0			1–3		
Reading		2–1	3–1	1–1	0–1						1–0	3–4	5–0		2–0				—					
Sheffield Wednesday	5–0		1–1	0–1	7–2		1–1											3–0		—		0–0	0–0	
Stevenage								2–2				2–1		0–1		1–2		3–0			—		1–0	
Stockport County	2–1	3–1	1–2		1–0					3–4							1–0		3–1			—		5–1
Wigan Athletic		2–1			3–2						0–2		0–0	3–1					1–0			0–4	—	0–1
Wycombe Wanderers						2–0						1–4		3–3	2–0			1–1	2–2	1–2				—

Updated to match(es) played on 21 November 2026. Source: BBC Sport
Legend: Blue = home team win; Yellow = draw; Red = away team win.
For upcoming matches, an "a" indicates there is an article about the rivalry between the two participants.

== Season statistics ==
As of 14 November 2026

=== Top goalscorers ===
Rank	Player	Club	Goals
1	(Wales) Aaron Collins	Milton Keynes Dons	13
2	(Wales) Joe Taylor	Huddersfield Town	10
2	(England) Kyle Wootton	Stockport County	10
4	(England) Jack Marriott	Reading	9
5	(Cape Verde) Derensili Sanches Fernandes	Huddersfield Town	7
5	(Bermuda) Nahki Wells	Luton Town	7
7	(England) Jack Diamond	Stockport County	6
7	(Wales) Mark Harris	Oxford United	6
7	(Denmark) Emil Riis	Leicester City	6
7	(England) Michael Smith	Mansfield Town	6
7	(England) Jayden Stockley	AFC Wimbledon	6
7	(England) Jayden Wareham	Wycombe Wanderers	6

=== Hat-tricks ===
Player	For	Against	Result	Date
(England) Jack Marriott	Reading	Luton Town	3–4 (H)	15 August 2026
(Wales) Aaron Collins (Note: Scored four goals.)	Milton Keynes Dons	Doncaster Rovers	6–1 (H)	31 October 2026

== Awards ==
=== Monthly ===
Each month the EFL announces their official Player of the Month and Manager of the Month.

Month	Manager of the Month		Player of the Month		Reference
August	(England) Martin Drury	Huddersfield Town	(Jamaica) Jamal Lowe	Sheffield Wednesday	
September	(England) Leam Richardson	Reading	(England) Jack Marriott	Reading	
October	(England) Martin Drury	Huddersfield Town	(Wales) Aaron Collins	Milton Keynes Dons	

== See also ==
- 2026–27 Premier League
- 2026–27 EFL Championship
- 2026–27 EFL League Two
- 2026–27 National League
- 2026–27 EFL Cup
- 2026–27 FA Cup
- 2026–27 EFL Trophy
