= 2025–26 EFL League One =

22nd season of EFL League One

EFL League One
- Season: 2025–26
- Dates: 1 August 2025 – 24 May 2026
- Champions: Lincoln City; 1st League One title 4th third-tier title
- Promoted: Lincoln City; Cardiff City; Bolton Wanderers
- Relegated: Exeter City; Rotherham United; Port Vale; Northampton Town
- Matches: 454
- Goals: 1,182 (2.6 per match)
- Top goalscorer: Dom Ballard (23 goals)
- Biggest home win: Peterborough United 5–0 AFC Wimbledon (8 November 2025); Barnsley 5–0 Luton Town (22 November 2025); Huddersfield Town 5–0 Port Vale (26 December 2025); Peterborough United 6–1 Wigan Athletic (7 February 2026) Peterborough United 5–0 Rotherham United (17 March 2026)
- Biggest away win: Burton Albion 0–4 Plymouth Argyle (27 September 2025); Burton Albion 0–4 Leyton Orient (29 November 2025); Doncaster Rovers 1–5 Plymouth Argyle (20 December 2025); Exeter City 0–4 Rotherham United (31 January 2026); Blackpool 0–4 Plymouth Argyle (14 February 2026); Doncaster Rovers 0–4 Cardiff City (28 February 2026); Exeter City 1–5 Bolton Wanderers (28 February 2026); Exeter City 0–4 Cardiff City (14 March 2026); AFC Wimbledon 0-4 Huddersfield Town (2 May 2026)
- Highest scoring: Mansfield Town 5-4 Cardiff City (2 May 2026)
- Longest winning run: Lincoln City (6 games)
- Longest unbeaten run: Lincoln City (29 games)
- Longest winless run: Exeter City, Northampton Town (13 games)
- Longest losing run: Northampton Town (8 games)
- Highest attendance: 27,280; Cardiff City 0–2 Lincoln City (7 March 2026)
- Lowest attendance: 2,715; Stevenage 2–1 Port Vale (17 February 2026)
- Total attendance: 4,608,965
- Average attendance: 9,912
- All statistics correct as of 17 May 2026.

The 2025–26 EFL League One (referred to as Sky Bet League One due to sponsorship reasons) was the 22nd season of the EFL League One under its current title, and the 34th season under its current league division format.

== Summary ==
=== Pre-season managerial changes ===
On 3 May 2025, it was announced that both former Arsenal and Wales captain Aaron Ramsey and Jon Worthington who had served as interim managers at newly relegated Cardiff City & Huddersfield Town, respectively would leave their roles following the end of their interim spells in charge of the clubs with Ramsey being replaced at Cardiff by former Manchester City academy coach Brian Barry-Murphy on 16 June 2025 and Worthington being replaced by former Manchester United back-up goalkeeper Lee Grant on 28 May 2025. On 31 May 2025, it was announced that Miron Muslić at newly relegated Plymouth Argyle would leave the club to join 2. Bundesliga club FC Schalke 04 with former Manchester United player and former Watford manager Tom Cleverley named as his replacement on 13 June 2025.

=== In-season managerial changes ===
On 18 September 2025, Wycombe Wanderers announced that Mike Dodds had been sacked with the club at the time of Dodds' departure sitting in 19th place - with him becoming the first managerial departure of the season and the first managerial sacking for Wycombe since Gary Waddock in 2012 - he was replaced by former Barnsley and Huddersfield Town manager Michael Duff on 18 September 2025. On 4 October 2025, Blackpool announced that they had parted company with former Newcastle United manager Steve Bruce with the club sitting second-from-bottom at the time of the sacking with him being replaced by former Bolton Wanderers manager and former Blackpool player Ian Evatt on 21 October 2025. On 6 October 2025, Luton Town announced that Matt Bloomfield had been sacked by the club with them in 11th place at the time of Bloomfield's departure with him replaced by former Arsenal player and former Norwich City interim manager Jack Wilshire on 13 October 2025. On 25 October 2025, Peterborough United announced that they had parted ways with Darren Ferguson with the club rock-bottom of the league with Ferguson being replaced by former Swansea City manager Luke Williams on 29 October 2025. On 26 October 2025, it was announced that former Reading player Noel Hunt had left the club by mutual consent with the club in 19th place at the time of his departure - he was the first-ever sacking by new Reading owner Rob Couhig as he didn't sack a manager whilst he owned former club Wycombe Wanderers - Hunt was replaced by former Wigan Athletic and Rotherham United manager Leam Richardson on 28 October 2025. On 28 December 2025, Port Vale announced that Darren Moore had left the club with the club rock-bottom of the league at the time of his departure with Moore being replaced by Jon Brady on 6 January 2026. On 17 January 2026, Huddersfield Town announced that they had parted ways with former Ipswich Town assistant manager and Manchester United back-up goalkeeper Lee Grant with them in 6th place upon his departure with Grant being replaced by former Bristol City and Norwich City manager Liam Manning on 20 January 2026. On 8 February 2026, Wigan Athletic announced that they had sacked Ryan Lowe with them in 22nd place at the time of his departure with Lowe being replaced by former Exeter City manager Gary Caldwell on 16 February 2026. On 16 February 2026, Exeter City announced that Gary Caldwell had left the club to sign for Wigan Athletic on the same day with Caldwell being replaced by Matt Taylor on 3 March 2026. On 9 March 2026, Northampton Town announced that they had parted company with manager Kevin Nolan with Northampton in 23rd place upon his departure.

== Team changes ==
The following teams have changed division since the 2024–25 season:

=== To League One ===
Promoted from League Two

- Doncaster Rovers
- Port Vale
- Bradford City
- AFC Wimbledon

Relegated from the Championship

- Luton Town
- Plymouth Argyle
- Cardiff City

=== From League One ===
Promoted to the Championship

- Birmingham City
- Wrexham
- Charlton Athletic

Relegated to League Two

- Crawley Town
- Bristol Rovers
- Cambridge United
- Shrewsbury Town

== Stadiums and locations ==
Locations of the 2025–26 EFL League One teams

Note: Table lists in alphabetical order.

Team	Location	Stadium	Capacity
AFC Wimbledon	London (Wimbledon)	Plough Lane	9,215
Barnsley	Barnsley	Oakwell	23,287
Blackpool	Blackpool	Bloomfield Road	16,616
Bolton Wanderers	Horwich	Toughsheet Community Stadium	28,723
Bradford City	Bradford	Valley Parade	25,136
Burton Albion	Burton upon Trent	Pirelli Stadium	6,912
(Wales) Cardiff City	(Wales) Cardiff (Leckwith)	Cardiff City Stadium	33,280
Doncaster Rovers	Doncaster	Eco-Power Stadium	15,231
Exeter City	Exeter	St. James Park	8,219
Huddersfield Town	Huddersfield	Kirklees Stadium	24,121
Leyton Orient	London (Leyton)	Brisbane Road	9,271
Lincoln City	Lincoln	Sincil Bank	10,669
Luton Town	Luton	Kenilworth Road	12,300
Mansfield Town	Mansfield	Field Mill	9,186
Northampton Town	Northampton (Sixfields)	Sixfields Stadium	8,203
Peterborough United	Peterborough	London Road Stadium	15,314
Plymouth Argyle	Plymouth	Home Park	18,173
Port Vale	Stoke-on-Trent (Burslem)	Vale Park	16,800
Reading	Reading (Green Park)	Madejski Stadium	24,161
Rotherham United	Rotherham	New York Stadium	12,021
Stevenage	Stevenage	Broadhall Way	7,200
Stockport County	Stockport (Edgeley)	Edgeley Park	10,841
Wigan Athletic	Wigan	Brick Community Stadium	25,133
Wycombe Wanderers	High Wycombe	Adams Park	10,137

== Personnel, sponsoring and season articles ==
Team	Manager	Captain	Kit manufacturer	Shirt sponsor (chest)	Shirt sponsor (back)	Shirt sponsor (sleeve)	Shorts sponsor
AFC Wimbledon	(England) Johnnie Jackson	(England) Jake Reeves	(Italy) Lotto	Football Manager (H)/War Child (A)/Private Office Asset Management (T)	Togglit	Silvermere Golf Store	DFTBA
Barnsley	(Republic of Ireland) Conor Hourihane	(Republic of Ireland) Luca Connell	(England) Oxen	The Investment Room (H) / Rapid Response Telecoms (A)	Vitruvian Dental Studio	The Investment Room	Rapid Response Telecoms
Blackpool	(England) Ian Evatt	(England) Fraser Horsfall	(Germany) Puma	TreadTracker.com (H)/Pleasure Beach Resort (A)	Visit Blackpool	None	None
Bolton Wanderers	(England) Steven Schumacher	(Northern Ireland) Eoin Toal	(Italy) Macron	Victorian Plumbing(H & A)/Bolton Wanderers in the Community (T)	Ebuyer	Whites Beaconsfield	Destinology
Bradford City	(Scotland) Graham Alexander	(England) Max Power	(Italy) Macron	JCT600	University of Bradford	Flamingo Land/Penny Appeal (in league cup matches)	Regal Foods
Burton Albion	(England) Gary Bowyer	(England) Udoka Godwin-Malife	(England) TAG	Burton Kia	Russell Roof Tiles	Home and Trade	Hardy Signs
(Wales) Cardiff City	(Republic of Ireland) Brian Barry-Murphy	(England) Calum Chambers	(United States) New Balance	Visit Malaysia	Dragonbet	Watches of Bath	Nyne Capital
Doncaster Rovers	(Northern Ireland) Grant McCann	(England) Owen Bailey	(England) Oxen	Eco-Power Group	Stoneacre Motor Group	MF Hire	IPM Group
Exeter City	(England) Matt Taylor	(Republic of Ireland) Pierce Sweeney	(Germany) Adidas	HEL Performance	Taking Care Personal Alarms	Bidfood	EMS Waste Services
Huddersfield Town	(England) Liam Manning	(England) Ryan Ledson	(England) Castore	HEYDUDE	Utilita	Core Facility	Leading Edge Signage
Leyton Orient	(England) Richie Wellens	(England) Will Forrester	(Germany) Puma	Eastdil Secured	Moore Kingston Smith	Peritium Search Associates	Quattro Group
Lincoln City	(England) Michael Skubala	(Zimbabwe) Tendayi Darikwa	(England) Oxen	Branston (H)/University of Lincoln (A)	Allen Signs	Easy Heat Pumps	Nicholsons Chartered Accountants
Luton Town	(England) Jack Wilshere	(Scotland) Kal Naismith	(England) Reflo	Capital Sky	Utilita	Switchshop	None
Mansfield Town	(England) Nigel Clough	(Republic of Ireland) Ryan Sweeney	(Italy) Errea	One Call Insurance (H)/OCL Solicitors (A)/BeeNoticed (T)	A. Wass Funeral Directors (H)/AGG Electrical Safety Testing (A)	Source Travel (H)	A Woodland & Son
Northampton Town	Vacant	(England) Jon Guthrie	(Germany) Puma	University of Northampton	Snowdon Homes Ltd	Green Ape Media	LCS The Cleaning Company
Peterborough United	(England) Luke Williams	(England) Sam Hughes	(Germany) Puma	Mick George	Princebuild	Next Level FibreOptics	Millfield Auto Parts
Plymouth Argyle	(England) Tom Cleverley	(England) Joe Edwards	(Germany) Puma	Classic Builders	Project 35	Vertu Motors	Retain Limited
Port Vale	(Australia) Jon Brady	(England) Ben Garrity	(Germany) Puma	None	Staffordshire University	IronMarket Wealth	Global QA
Reading	(England) Leam Richardson	(England) Lewis Wing	(Italy) Macron	Select Car Leasing	Village Hotel Club	Barracuda Networks	CRL Fire & Flood Damage
Rotherham United	(England) Lee Clark	(Republic of Ireland) Joe Rafferty	(Germany) Puma	Bluebell Wood	KCM Waste Management	Defaqto	Mears Group
Stevenage	(England) Alex Revell	(England) Carl Piergianni	(Italy) Macron	Xsolla	HG Group	Everyone Active	Perfect Pet Insurance
Stockport County	(England) Dave Challinor	(England) Lewis Bate	(Germany) Puma	VITA	DeliveryApp	GroFu	None
Wigan Athletic	(Scotland) Gary Caldwell	(Scotland) Jason Kerr	(Germany) Puma	Smurfit Westrock	Greenmount Projects	None	None
Wycombe Wanderers	(Northern Ireland) Michael Duff	(Scotland) Jack Grimmer	(Denmark) Hummel	Origin Doors and Windows	Buckinghamshire New University	Kress	Cherry Red Records

== Managerial changes ==
Team	Outgoing manager	Manner of departure	Date of vacancy	Position in the table	Incoming manager	Date of appointment
Cardiff City	(Wales) Aaron Ramsey	End of interim spell	3 May 2025	Pre-season	(Republic of Ireland) Brian Barry-Murphy	16 June 2025
Huddersfield Town	(England) Jon Worthington	End of interim spell	3 May 2025	Pre-season	(England) Lee Grant	28 May 2025
Plymouth Argyle	(Austria) Miron Muslić	Signed by Schalke 04	31 May 2025	Pre-season	(England) Tom Cleverley	13 June 2025
Wycombe Wanderers	(England) Mike Dodds	Sacked	18 September 2025	19th	(Northern Ireland) Michael Duff	18 September 2025
Blackpool	(England) Steve Bruce	Sacked	4 October 2025	23rd	(England) Ian Evatt	21 October 2025
Luton Town	(England) Matt Bloomfield	Sacked	6 October 2025	11th	(England) Jack Wilshere	13 October 2025
Peterborough United	(Scotland) Darren Ferguson	Sacked	25 October 2025	24th	(England) Luke Williams	29 October 2025
Reading	(Republic of Ireland) Noel Hunt	Sacked	26 October 2025	19th	(England) Leam Richardson	28 October 2025
Port Vale	(Jamaica) Darren Moore	Sacked	28 December 2025	24th	(Australia) Jon Brady	6 January 2026
Huddersfield Town	(England) Lee Grant	Sacked	17 January 2026	6th	(England) Liam Manning	20 January 2026
Wigan Athletic	(England) Ryan Lowe	Sacked	7 February 2026	22nd	(Scotland) Gary Caldwell	16 February 2026
Exeter City	(Scotland) Gary Caldwell	Signed by Wigan Athletic	16 February 2026	14th	(England) Matt Taylor	3 March 2026
Northampton Town	(England) Kevin Nolan	Sacked	9 March 2026	23rd	(Scotland) Colin Calderwood (interim)	9 March 2026
Rotherham United	(England) Matt Hamshaw	Sacked	18 March 2026	22nd	(England) Lee Clark	18 March 2026

== League table ==
Pos	Team	Pld	W	D	L	GF	GA	GD	Pts	Promotion, qualification or relegation
1	Lincoln City (C, P)	46	31	10	5	89	41	+48	103	Promotion to EFL Championship
2	Cardiff City (P)	46	27	10	9	90	50	+40	91	Promotion to EFL Championship
3	Stockport County	46	22	11	13	71	58	+13	77	Qualification for League One play-offs
4	Bradford City	46	22	11	13	58	51	+7	77	Qualification for League One play-offs
5	Bolton Wanderers (O, P)	46	19	18	9	70	52	+18	75	Qualification for League One play-offs
6	Stevenage	46	21	12	13	49	46	+3	75	Qualification for League One play-offs
7	Luton Town	46	21	11	14	68	56	+12	74	
8	Plymouth Argyle	46	22	7	17	75	63	+12	73	
9	Huddersfield Town	46	18	13	15	74	64	+10	67	
10	Mansfield Town	46	16	17	13	62	50	+12	65	
11	Wycombe Wanderers	46	17	12	17	69	58	+11	63	
12	Reading	46	16	15	15	64	60	+4	63	
13	Blackpool	46	17	9	20	54	65	−11	60	
14	Doncaster Rovers	46	17	9	20	50	69	−19	60	
15	Barnsley	46	15	14	17	68	73	−5	59	
16	Wigan Athletic	46	14	14	18	49	58	−9	56	
17	Burton Albion	46	13	15	18	50	60	−10	54	
18	Peterborough United	46	15	8	23	64	68	−4	53	
19	AFC Wimbledon	46	15	8	23	51	72	−21	53	
20	Leyton Orient	46	14	10	22	59	71	−12	52	
21	Exeter City (R)	46	12	13	21	52	61	−9	49	Relegation to EFL League Two
22	Port Vale (R)	46	10	12	24	36	61	−25	42	Relegation to EFL League Two
23	Rotherham United (R)	46	10	11	25	41	71	−30	41	Relegation to EFL League Two
24	Northampton Town (R)	46	9	8	29	39	74	−35	35	Relegation to EFL League Two

Source: EFL Official Website
Rules for classification: 1) Points; 2) Goal difference; 3) Number of goals scored; 4) Head-to-head results; 5) Wins; 6) Away goals; 7) Penalty points (sec 9.5); 8) 12-point sending off offences
(C) Champions; (O) Play-off winners; (P) Promoted; (R) Relegated

== Results ==
Home \ Away	WIM	BAR	BLP	BOL	BRA	BRT	CAR	DON	EXE	HUD	LEY	LIN	LUT	MAN	NOR	PET	PLY	PVL	REA	ROT	STE	STK	WIG	WYC
AFC Wimbledon	—	2–0	4–1	0–1	3–1	0–1	0–1	0–1	0–1	0–4	2–4	2–0	0–3	0–0	1–0	1–1	1–3	1–1	3–2	2–1	0–0	0–2	1–2	2–1
Barnsley	3–3	—	2–1	1–1	2–2	3–2	1–1	0–1	2–1	3–1	3–2	0–2	5–0	2–3	2–2	2–1	0–3	0–2	3–2	0–1	3–1	1–3	1–1	0–1
Blackpool	0–2	1–0	—	1–1	1–2	1–0	3–1	1–0	1–0	3–2	1–0	2–2	2–2	1–0	2–0	3–1	0–4	3–2	0–3	4–0	2–3	1–2	1–1	1–1
Bolton Wanderers	3–0	3–2	2–2	—	0–0	2–1	1–0	0–0	2–1	3–3	2–1	1–1	2–3	0–1	0–0	2–1	2–0	4–0	1–1	2–1	5–1	2–2	4–1	3–2
Bradford City	3–2	2–2	1–0	1–1	—	1–2	1–2	1–0	1–0	3–1	2–1	0–0	2–1	1–1	1–0	2–0	1–1	1–0	2–0	1–0	0–1	1–0	2–1	2–1
Burton Albion	1–0	1–1	1–0	3–0	2–1	—	2–2	1–2	1–1	3–1	0–4	0–1	0–3	2–1	5–1	0–1	0–4	0–0	1–2	1–0	0–1	3–0	0–2	0–0
Cardiff City	4–1	4–0	0–0	2–0	1–3	0–1	—	4–3	1–0	3–2	4–3	0–2	3–1	3–0	5–1	2–1	4–0	1–0	2–1	3–0	2–1	1–1	1–0	0–2
Doncaster Rovers	1–2	1–2	2–1	1–1	3–1	1–1	0–4	—	1–0	1–0	3–0	0–2	1–1	0–2	1–2	2–1	1–5	1–0	1–0	1–0	1–1	0–2	3–3	1–1
Exeter City	1–0	3–0	4–1	1–5	1–2	1–1	0–4	3–0	—	0–1	0–0	0–1	1–0	1–2	0–0	3–0	2–0	0–2	1–1	0–4	3–0	3–3	1–1	1–1
Huddersfield Town	3–3	2–1	2–2	1–2	1–0	0–0	1–1	2–0	2–2	—	3–0	2–2	1–0	1–4	2–0	3–2	3–1	5–0	1–1	1–0	1–0	1–2	1–1	3–3
Leyton Orient	1–3	1–3	1–1	1–1	2–1	2–2	1–1	4–0	2–1	1–2	—	1–0	1–1	0–0	0–1	2–1	1–3	0–1	3–1	0–2	2–3	2–2	2–0	2–0
Lincoln City	1–0	3–1	4–0	1–1	3–0	2–1	2–1	2–1	0–1	1–1	2–1	—	3–1	1–1	4–0	5–2	3–2	1–0	2–0	3–0	1–0	3–1	2–2	4–3
Luton Town	1–0	2–1	1–0	1–1	2–1	1–1	0–1	1–0	3–2	2–1	3–0	2–2	—	0–2	2–1	2–1	2–3	2–2	2–3	0–0	2–1	1–1	1–0	4–0
Mansfield Town	2–2	2–2	2–0	0–1	3–0	0–0	5–4	1–2	0–0	1–3	4–1	0–2	2–2	—	4–1	1–2	2–0	3–0	1–0	2–1	1–1	1–2	1–1	0–0
Northampton Town	3–1	0–1	1–0	2–0	0–0	0–2	1–3	1–3	2–0	1–1	1–2	0–1	0–1	2–1	—	1–1	2–3	0–1	0–2	1–2	3–1	0–0	1–3	1–2
Peterborough United	5–0	0–1	1–2	3–1	1–1	1–1	1–1	1–3	3–3	2–3	1–0	0–3	0–2	0–0	2–1	—	0–1	1–3	1–1	5–0	0–1	3–0	6–1	2–1
Plymouth Argyle	1–2	1–3	1–0	1–2	0–1	3–0	5–2	2–1	2–2	3–1	0–1	1–4	1–0	1–1	0–3	0–1	—	2–1	1–4	1–0	1–0	4–2	1–1	1–1
Port Vale	0–1	0–0	5–1	1–0	0–2	2–2	0–0	0–1	1–3	0–0	2–3	0–2	1–1	2–1	0–0	0–1	0–1	—	1–1	1–0	1–2	0–3	0–0	0–0
Reading	1–2	2–2	0–1	1–1	2–1	2–0	1–3	1–1	2–2	0–2	2–1	1–2	3–2	1–1	1–0	1–2	2–2	1–0	—	1–1	1–0	1–0	3–0	3–2
Rotherham United	1–1	1–3	0–3	2–2	2–2	2–2	0–3	1–2	1–0	1–3	1–0	3–0	0–2	0–0	2–1	0–2	1–0	2–1	1–1	—	0–0	0–1	2–2	1–1
Stevenage	1–0	1–0	1–0	0–0	1–1	2–2	0–1	0–0	2–1	1–0	1–2	2–2	2–0	1–1	2–0	1–0	1–1	2–1	1–0	1–0	—	2–1	1–0	1–0
Stockport County	3–0	1–1	1–0	2–0	1–2	2–1	1–1	4–2	1–0	1–0	0–0	1–2	0–3	0–1	2–1	3–1	2–1	1–2	1–1	3–2	1–3	—	4–2	3–0
Wigan Athletic	0–1	1–1	0–2	0–1	2–0	1–0	0–2	3–0	2–0	1–0	0–0	0–1	1–0	2–1	3–1	2–0	0–3	1–0	1–2	3–0	0–0	1–1	—	0–1
Wycombe Wanderers	2–0	2–2	0–1	2–1	1–2	3–0	1–1	4–0	0–1	3–0	4–1	3–2	1–2	2–0	2–0	0–2	0–1	4–0	2–2	3–2	3–1	1–2	2–0	—

Source: BBC Sport
Legend: Blue = home team win; Yellow = draw; Red = away team win.
For upcoming matches, an "a" indicates there is an article about the rivalry between the two participants.

== Play-offs ==
=== Bracket ===
Semi-finals
6	Stevenage	0	0	0
3	Stockport County	1	2	3
5	Bolton Wanderers	1	1	2
4	Bradford City	0	0	0

Final
3	Stockport County	1
5	Bolton Wanderers	4

=== Semi-finals ===
First leg

9 May 2026
15:00 BST

Stevenage	0–1	Stockport County
	Report	Osborn 90+4'

Broadhall Way, Stevenage
Attendance: 7,321
Referee: Charles Breakspear
9 May 2026
20:00 BST

Bolton Wanderers	1–0	Bradford City
Cozier-Duberry 60'	Report

Toughsheet Community Stadium, Bolton
Attendance: 22,789
Referee: Martin Coy

Second leg

13 May 2026
20:00 BST

Stockport County	2–0	Stevenage
Barry 14'; Wootton 28'	Report

Edgeley Park, Stockport
Attendance: 10,243
Referee: Josh Smith

Stockport County won 3–0 on aggregate.

14 May 2026
20:00 BST

Bradford City	0–1	Bolton Wanderers
	Report	Simons 81'

University of Bradford Stadium, Bradford
Attendance: 22,381
Referee: Thomas Kirk

Bolton Wanderers won 2–0 on aggregate.

=== Final ===
24 May 2026
13:00 BST

Stockport County	1–4	Bolton Wanderers
Sidibeh 29'	Report	Rodrigues 3', 90+4' (pen.); Wootton 64' (o.g.); Dalby 81'

Wembley Stadium, London
Attendance: 48,268
Referee: Josh Smith

== Season statistics ==
As of 2 May 2026

=== Top goalscorers ===
Rank	Player	Club	Goals
1	(England) Dom Ballard	Leyton Orient	23
2	(England) Jayden Wareham	Exeter City	19
2	(England) Kyle Wootton	Stockport County	19
4	(Switzerland) Lorent Tolaj	Plymouth Argyle; Port Vale	18
5	(England) Harry Leonard	Peterborough United	16
5	(England) Jack Marriott	Reading	16
5	(Canada) Aribim Pepple	Plymouth Argyle	16
8	(England) Ashley Fletcher	Blackpool	15
8	(Republic of Ireland) David McGoldrick	Barnsley	15
8	(Wales) Joe Taylor	Wigan Athletic; Huddersfield Town	15

=== Hat-tricks ===
Player	For	Against	Result	Date
(England) Dom Ballard	Leyton Orient	Doncaster Rovers	4–0	11 October 2025
(Switzerland) Lorent Tolaj	Plymouth Argyle	Doncaster Rovers	1–5	20 December 2025
(England) Dom Ballard	Leyton Orient	Reading	3–1	17 January 2026
(England) Marcus Browne	AFC Wimbledon	Reading	3–2	7 February 2026
(England) Kyrell Lisbie	Peterborough United	Wigan Athletic	6–1	7 February 2026
(England) Jack Marriott	Reading	Wycombe Wanderers	3–2	14 February 2026
(England) Jayden Wareham	Exeter City	Peterborough United	3–3	21 February 2026
(Republic of Ireland) David McGoldrick	Barnsley	Leyton Orient	1–3	28 February 2026
(Nigeria) Kelvin Ehibhatiomhan	Reading	Luton Town	2–3	7 March 2026
(England) Dom Ballard	Leyton Orient	AFC Wimbledon	2–4	17 March 2026

=== Clean sheets ===
Rank	Player	Club	Clean sheets
1	(Republic of Ireland) Josh Keeley	Luton Town	11
1	(England) Nathan Trott	Cardiff City	11
3	(England) Filip Marschall	Stevenage	10
3	(England) Joe Whitworth	Exeter City	10
3	(England) George Wickens	Lincoln City	10
6	(England) Sam Walker	Bradford City	9

=== Discipline ===
==== Player ====
- Most yellow cards: 14
  - (England) Max Power (Bradford City)
- Most red cards: 2
  - (England) Fraser Horsfall (Blackpool)
  - (England) James Husband (Blackpool)
  - (Wales) Joe Lewis (AFC Wimbledon)
  - (England) Alfie May (Huddersfield Town)
  - (England) Steven Sessegnon (Wigan Athletic)
  - (Wales) Vimal Yoganathan (Barnsley)

==== Club ====
- Most yellow cards: 119
  - Plymouth Argyle
- Most red cards: 9
  - Wigan Athletic
- Fewest yellow cards: 67
  - Wigan Athletic
- Fewest red cards: 0
  - Burton Albion
  - Doncaster Rovers
  - Exeter City
  - Luton Town
  - Reading

== Awards ==
=== Monthly ===
Each month the EFL announces their official Player of the Month and Manager of the Month.

Month	Manager of the Month		Player of the Month		Reference
August	(Republic of Ireland) Brian Barry-Murphy	Cardiff City	(England) Owen Bailey	Doncaster Rovers	
September	(England) Michael Skubala	Lincoln City	(England) Josh Neufville	Bradford City	
October	(England) Dave Challinor	Stockport County	(England) Amario Cozier-Duberry	Bolton Wanderers	
November	(Republic of Ireland) Conor Hourihane	Barnsley	(Republic of Ireland) Aaron Connolly	Leyton Orient	
December	(Republic of Ireland) Brian Barry-Murphy	Cardiff City	(England) Leo Castledine	Huddersfield Town	
January	(England) Michael Skubala	Lincoln City	(England) Dom Ballard	Leyton Orient	
February	(England) Michael Skubala	Lincoln City	(Republic of Ireland) David McGoldrick	Barnsley	
March	(England) Tom Cleverley	Plymouth Argyle	(Nigeria) Kelvin Ehibhatiomhan	Reading	
April	(England) Michael Skubala	Lincoln City	(Jamaica) Kasey Palmer	Luton Town	

=== Annual ===
Award	Winner	Club
Player of the Season	(England) Dom Ballard	Leyton Orient
Young Player of the Season	(England) Dom Ballard	Leyton Orient
Apprentice of the Season	(Spain) Sulyman Krubally	Burton Albion

League One Team of the Season

Pos.	Player	Club	Ref.
GK	(England) George Wickens	Lincoln City	
RB	(Zimbabwe) Tendayi Darikwa	Lincoln City	
CB	(England) Charlie Goode	Stevenage	
CB	(England) Sonny Bradley	Lincoln City	
LB	(Republic of Ireland) Joel Bagan	Cardiff City	
RW	(England) Amario Cozier-Duberry	Bolton Wanderers	
CM	(Northern Ireland) Oliver Norwood	Stockport County	
CM	(England) Owen Bailey	Doncaster Rovers	
LW	(Republic of Ireland) Jack Moylan	Lincoln City	
ST	(England) Kyle Wootton	Stockport County	
ST	(England) Dom Ballard	Leyton Orient	
Manager	(England) Michael Skubala	Lincoln City	

== Attendances ==
EFL League One clubs listed by average home league attendance in the 2025–26 season:

Pos	Club	Average attendance
1	Bolton Wanderers	21,692
2	Bradford City	20,444
3	Cardiff City	19,564
4	Huddersfield Town	16,358
5	Plymouth Argyle	15,695
6	Reading FC	12,194
7	Barnsley FC	11,144
8	Luton Town	11,039
9	Blackpool FC	10,035
10	Wigan Athletic	9,978
11	Stockport County	9,440
12	Lincoln City	9,431
13	Doncaster Rovers	8,660
14	Rotherham United	8,519
15	AFC Wimbledon	8,396
16	Peterborough United	8,126
17	Leyton Orient	8,043
18	Mansfield Town	8,041
19	Port Vale	7,257
20	Exeter City	6,655
21	Northampton Town	6,544
22	Wycombe Wanderers	5,550
23	Stevenage FC	4,237
24	Burton Albion	4,130

== See also ==
- 2025–26 Premier League
- 2025–26 EFL Championship
- 2025–26 EFL League Two
- 2025–26 National League
- 2025–26 EFL Cup
- 2025–26 FA Cup
- 2025–26 EFL Trophy
