= Minority =

Minority may refer to:

== Politics ==
- Minority government, formed when a political party does not have a majority of overall seats in parliament
- Minority leader, in American politics, the floor leader of the second largest caucus in a legislative body

== Society ==
- Minor (law), legal category of people under the age of majority
  - Age of majority, the threshold of adulthood as recognized or declared in law
  - Legal age, age at which a person may legally engage in a certain activity
- Minority group, a category of people differentiated from the social majority (e.g. ethnic minority)
- Sexual minority, a group whose sexual identity, orientation or practices differ from the majority of society

== Music ==
- "Minority" (Gigi Gryce song), a 1953 jazz standard
- "Minority" (Green Day song), a 2000 punk rock song
- "Minority", a song by the Subhumans from their 1983 album The Day the Country Died

== Other uses ==
- Minority (philosophy), concept coined by philosopher Gilles Deleuze and Félix Guattari

== See also ==
- Majority (disambiguation)
- Minority Party (disambiguation)
- Minority Report (disambiguation)
- Minority rights, individual and collective rights of minority groups
- Ethnic group, an ethnicity
- Minority influence, a form of social influence
- Minority language, a language spoken by a minority of the population
- Minority-serving institution, a term in American higher education
- Minority business enterprise, American business term
- Minority interest, in business
- Majority minority (American), where one or more racial/ethnic minorities make up a majority of population
  - List of majority minority United States congressional districts
- Visible minority (Canadian), persons, other than aboriginal peoples, who are non-Caucasian in race or non-white in colour
