= Majority (disambiguation) =

Majority (absolute majority), a mathematic concept, is the greater part, or more than half, of the total.

Majority may also refer to:

- Majority rule, a social choice rule that states that an option preferred by a majority of the vote should always win
- Absolute majority, more than half of a total, in the context of voting, including abstentions
- Simple majority, more than half of a total basis, in the context of voting, excluding abstentions
- Plurality, sometimes referred to as "relative majority"
- Majority (sociology), related to the minority group
- Age of majority, the threshold of adulthood in law
- Majority function in Boolean algebra
- The office held by a member of the armed forces in the rank of major
- Majority (film), a 2010 Turkish drama film
- Majority Audio, technology company and brand
- "Majority," a song by Charles Ives

== See also ==
- Major (disambiguation)
- Majority opinion, a judicial opinion agreed to by more than half of the members of a court
