= List of winners of the EFL League One and predecessors =

English League (3rd tier)

Football League Third Division (1920–1921) Football League Third Division North/South (1921–1958) Football League Third Division (1958–1992) Football League Second Division (1992–2004) Football League One (2004–2016) EFL League One (2016–present)
- Country
- England
- Founded
- 1920
- Number of teams
- 24 (2025–26 season)
- Current champions
- Lincoln City (2025–26)
- Most successful club
- Plymouth Argyle (5 championships)

A national third tier of English league football was established in 1958–59, as the Third Division. This followed on from the regional third tier that had been established in the south in 1920 and the north in 1921. In 1992, with the departure of the First Division clubs to become the Premier League, the third tier became known as the Second Division. Since 2004 it has been known as League One.

== Football League Third Division (1920–1921) ==
Season	Champions	Runners-up (not promoted)
1920–21	Crystal Palace	Southampton

== Football League Third Division North/South (1921–1958) ==
Season	North		South	
Season	Champions	Runners-up (not promoted)	Champions	Runners-up (not promoted)
1921–22	Stockport County	Darlington	Southampton	Plymouth Argyle
1922–23	Nelson	Bradford Park Avenue	Bristol City	Plymouth Argyle
1923–24	Wolverhampton Wanderers	Rochdale	Portsmouth	Plymouth Argyle
1924–25	Darlington	Nelson	Swansea City	Plymouth Argyle
1925–26	Grimsby Town	Bradford Park Avenue	Reading	Plymouth Argyle
1926–27	Stoke City	Rochdale	Bristol City (2)	Plymouth Argyle
1927–28	Bradford Park Avenue	Lincoln City	Millwall	Northampton Town
1928–29	Bradford City	Stockport County	Charlton Athletic	Crystal Palace
1929–30	Port Vale	Stockport County	Plymouth Argyle	Brentford
1930–31	Chesterfield	Lincoln City	Notts County	Crystal Palace
1931–32	Lincoln City	Gateshead	Fulham	Reading
1932–33	Hull City	Wrexham	Brentford	Exeter City
1933–34	Barnsley	Chesterfield	Norwich City	Coventry City
1934–35	Doncaster Rovers	Halifax Town	Charlton Athletic (2)	Reading
1935–36	Chesterfield (2)	Chester City	Coventry City	Luton Town
1936–37	Stockport County (2)	Lincoln City	Luton Town	Notts County
1937–38	Tranmere Rovers	Doncaster Rovers	Millwall (2)	Bristol City
1938–39	Barnsley (2)	Doncaster Rovers	Newport County	Crystal Palace
1939–40 to 1945–46	League suspended due to World War II			
1946–47	Doncaster Rovers (2)	Rotherham United	Cardiff City	Queens Park Rangers
1947–48	Lincoln City (2)	Rotherham United	Queens Park Rangers	Bournemouth & Boscombe Athletic
1948–49	Hull City (2)	Rotherham United	Swansea City (2)	Reading
1949–50	Doncaster Rovers (3)	Gateshead	Notts County (2)	Northampton Town
1950–51	Rotherham United	Mansfield Town	Nottingham Forest	Norwich City
1951–52	Lincoln City (3)	Grimsby Town	Plymouth Argyle (2)	Reading
1952–53	Oldham Athletic	Port Vale	Bristol Rovers	Millwall
1953–54	Port Vale (2)	Barnsley	Ipswich Town	Brighton & Hove Albion
1954–55	Barnsley (3)	Accrington Stanley	Bristol City (3)	Leyton Orient
1955–56	Grimsby Town (2)	Derby County	Leyton Orient	Brighton Hove & Albion
1956–57	Derby County	Hartlepool United	Ipswich Town (2)	Torquay United
1957–58	Scunthorpe United	Accrington Stanley	Brighton & Hove Albion	Brentford

== Football League Third Division (1958–1992) ==
Season	Champions	Runners-up	Also promoted	Play-off winners
1958–59	Plymouth Argyle (3)	Hull City		
1959–60	Southampton (2)	Norwich City		
1960–61	Bury	Walsall		
1961–62	Portsmouth (2)	Grimsby Town		
1962–63	Northampton Town	Swindon Town		
1963–64	Coventry City (2)	Crystal Palace		
1964–65	Carlisle United	Bristol City		
1965–66	Hull City (3)	Millwall		
1966–67	Queens Park Rangers (2)	Middlesbrough		
1967–68	Oxford United	Bury		
1968–69	Watford	Swindon Town		
1969–70	Leyton Orient (2)	Luton Town		
1970–71	Preston North End	Fulham		
1971–72	Aston Villa	Brighton and Hove Albion		
1972–73	Bolton Wanderers	Notts County		
1973–74	Oldham Athletic (2)	Bristol Rovers	York City	
1974–75	Blackburn Rovers	Plymouth Argyle	Charlton Athletic	
1975–76	Hereford United	Cardiff City	Millwall	
1976–77	Mansfield Town	Brighton and Hove Albion	Crystal Palace	
1977–78	Wrexham	Cambridge United	Preston North End	
1978–79	Shrewsbury Town	Watford	Swansea City	
1979–80	Grimsby Town (3)	Blackburn Rovers	Sheffield Wednesday	
1980–81	Rotherham United (2)	Barnsley	Charlton Athletic	
1981–82	Burnley	Carlisle United	Fulham	
1982–83	Portsmouth (3)	Cardiff City	Huddersfield Town	
1983–84	Oxford United (2)	Wimbledon	Sheffield United	
1984–85	Bradford City (2)	Millwall	Hull City	
1985–86	Reading (2)	Plymouth Argyle	Derby County	
1986–87	AFC Bournemouth	Middlesbrough		Swindon Town
1987–88	Sunderland	Brighton and Hove Albion		Walsall
1988–89	Wolverhampton Wanderers (2)	Sheffield United		Port Vale
1989–90	Bristol Rovers (2)	Bristol City		Notts County
1990–91	Cambridge United	Southend United	Grimsby Town	Tranmere Rovers
1991–92	Brentford (2)	Birmingham City		Peterborough United

== Football League Second Division (1992–2004) ==
Season	Champions	Runners-up	Play-off winners
1992–93	Stoke City (2)	Bolton Wanderers	West Bromwich Albion
1993–94	Reading (3)	Port Vale	Burnley
1994–95	Birmingham City	Brentford (not promoted)	Huddersfield Town
1995–96	Swindon Town	Oxford United	Bradford City
1996–97	Bury (2)	Stockport County	Crewe Alexandra
1997–98	Watford (2)	Bristol City	Grimsby Town
1998–99	Fulham (2)	Walsall	Manchester City
1999–2000	Preston North End (2)	Burnley	Gillingham
2000–01	Millwall (3)	Rotherham United	Walsall
2001–02	Brighton & Hove Albion (2)	Reading	Stoke City
2002–03	Wigan Athletic	Crewe Alexandra	Cardiff City
2003–04	Plymouth Argyle (4)	Queens Park Rangers	Brighton & Hove Albion

== Football League One/EFL League One (2004 onwards) ==
Season	Champions	Runners-up	Play-off winners
2004–05	Luton Town (2)	Hull City	Sheffield Wednesday
2005–06	Southend United	Colchester United	Barnsley
2006–07	Scunthorpe United (2)	Bristol City	Blackpool
2007–08	Swansea City (3)	Nottingham Forest	Doncaster Rovers
2008–09	Leicester City	Peterborough United	Scunthorpe United
2009–10	Norwich City (2)	Leeds United	Millwall
2010–11	Brighton & Hove Albion (3)	Southampton	Peterborough United
2011–12	Charlton Athletic (3)	Sheffield Wednesday	Huddersfield Town
2012–13	Doncaster Rovers (4)	Bournemouth	Yeovil Town
2013–14	Wolverhampton Wanderers (3)	Brentford	Rotherham United
2014–15	Bristol City (4)	Milton Keynes Dons	Preston North End
2015–16	Wigan Athletic (2)	Burton Albion	Barnsley
2016–17	Sheffield United	Bolton Wanderers	Millwall
2017–18	Wigan Athletic (3)	Blackburn Rovers	Rotherham United
2018–19	Luton Town (3)	Barnsley	Charlton Athletic
2019–20	Coventry City (3)	Rotherham United	Wycombe Wanderers
2020–21	Hull City (4)	Peterborough United	Blackpool
2021–22	Wigan Athletic (4)	Rotherham United	Sunderland
2022–23	Plymouth Argyle (5)	Ipswich Town	Sheffield Wednesday
2023–24	Portsmouth (4)	Derby County	Oxford United
2024–25	Birmingham City (2)	Wrexham	Charlton Athletic
2025–26	Lincoln City (4)	Cardiff City	Bolton Wanderers

== Number of titles overall ==
Clubs in bold are competing in the 2025–26 EFL League One.

Rank	Club	Winners	Winning seasons
1	**Plymouth Argyle**	5	1929–30 South, 1951–52 South, 1958–59, 2003–04, 2022–23
2	Bristol City	4	1922–23 South, 1926–27 South, 1954–55 South, 2014–15
2	**Doncaster Rovers**	4	1934–35 North, 1946–47 North, 1949–50 North, 2012–13
2	Hull City	4	1932–33 North, 1948–49 North, 1965–66, 2020–21
2	**Lincoln City**	4	1931–32 North, 1947–48 North, 1951–52 North, 2025–26
2	Portsmouth	4	1923–24 South, 1961–62, 1982–83, 2023–24
2	**Wigan Athletic**	4	2002–03, 2015–16, 2017–18, 2021–22
7	**Barnsley**	3	1933–34 North, 1938–39 North, 1954–55 North
7	Brighton & Hove Albion	3	1957–58 South, 2001–02, 2010–11
7	Charlton Athletic	3	1928–29 South, 1934–35 South, 2011–12
7	Coventry City	3	1935–36 South, 1963–64, 2019–20
7	Grimsby Town	3	1925–26 North, 1955–56 North, 1979–80
7	**Luton Town**	3	1936–37 South, 2004–05, 2018–19
7	Millwall	3	1927–28 South, 1937–38 South, 2000–01
7	**Reading**	3	1925–26 South, 1985–86, 1993–94
7	Swansea City	3	1924–25 South, 1948–49 South, 2007–08
7	Wolverhampton Wanderers	3	1923–24 North, 1988–89, 2013–14
19	Birmingham City	2	1994–95, 2024–25
19	**Bradford City**	2	1928–29 North, 1984–85
19	Brentford	2	1932–33 South, 1991–92
19	Bristol Rovers	2	1952–53 South, 1989–90
19	Bury	2	1960–61, 1996–97
19	Chesterfield	2	1930–31 North, 1935–36 North
19	Fulham	2	1931–32 South, 1998–99
19	Ipswich Town	2	1953–54 South, 1956–57 South
19	**Leyton Orient**	2	1955–56 South, 1969–70
19	Norwich City	2	1933–34 South, 2009–10
19	Notts County	2	1930–31 South, 1949–50 South
19	Oldham Athletic	2	1952–53 North, 1973–74
19	Oxford United	2	1967–68, 1983–84
19	**Port Vale**	2	1929–30 North, 1953–54 North
19	Preston North End	2	1970–71, 1999–2000
19	Queens Park Rangers	2	1947–48 South, 1966–67
19	**Rotherham United**	2	1950–51 North, 1980–81
19	Scunthorpe United	2	1957–58 North, 2006–07
19	Southampton	2	1921–22 South, 1959–60
19	**Stockport County**	2	1921–22 North, 1936–37 North
19	Stoke City	2	1926–27 North, 1992–93
19	Watford	2	1968–69, 1997–98
41	AFC Bournemouth	1	1986–87
41	Aston Villa	1	1971–72
41	Blackburn Rovers	1	1974–75
41	**Bolton Wanderers**	1	1972–73
41	Bradford Park Avenue	1	1927–28 North
41	Burnley	1	1981–82
41	Cambridge United	1	1990–91
41	**Cardiff City**	1	1946–47 South
41	Carlisle United	1	1964–65
41	Crystal Palace	1	1920–21
41	Darlington	1	1924–25 North
41	Derby County	1	1956–57 North
41	Hereford United	1	1975–76
41	Leicester City	1	2008–09
41	**Mansfield Town**	1	1976–77
41	Nelson	1	1922–23 North
41	Newport County	1	1938–39 South
41	**Northampton Town**	1	1962–63
41	Nottingham Forest	1	1950–51 South
41	Sheffield United	1	2016–17
41	Shrewsbury Town	1	1978–79
41	Southend United	1	2005–06
41	Sunderland	1	1987–88
41	Swindon Town	1	1995–96
41	Tranmere Rovers	1	1937–38 North
41	Wrexham	1	1977–78
