= EFL League One =

English association football league

- Organising body: English Football League
- Founded: 2004; 22 years ago: 1992–2004 (as Division Two); 1958–1992 (as Division Three); 1921–1958 (as Division Three North/South); 1920–1921 (as Division Three)
- Country: England
- Other club from: Wales
- Confederation: UEFA
- Chairman: Rick Parry
- Chief Executive Officer: Trevor Birch
- Number of clubs: 24
- Level on pyramid: 3
- Promotion to: EFL Championship
- Relegation to: EFL League Two
- Domestic cup: FA Cup
- League cups: EFL Cup; EFL Trophy
- International cups: UEFA Europa League (via FA Cup); UEFA Conference League (via EFL Cup)
- Current champions: Lincoln City; 1st League One title 4th third tier title (2025–26)
- Most championships: Plymouth Argyle (5 titles total); Wigan Athletic (4 League One titles)
- Broadcaster(s): List of broadcasters
- Sponsor(s): Sky Bet
- Website: efl.com/competitions/efl-league-one
- Current: 2026–27 EFL League One

The English Football League One is the second-highest division of the English Football League and the third tier overall in the English football league system, after the Premier League and the EFL Championship. It is contested by 24 professional clubs.

Introduced in the 2004–05 English football season as Football League One, it is a rebrand of the former Football League Second Division.

Burton Albion currently hold the longest tenure in the division following relegation from the Championship at the end of the 2017–18 season. There are nine former Premier League clubs currently competing in this division: Barnsley (1997–98), Blackpool (2010–11), Bradford City (1999–2001), Huddersfield Town (2017–2019), Leicester City, Luton Town (2023–24), Reading (2006–2008 and 2012–13), Sheffield Wednesday and Wigan Athletic (2005–2013).

== Map ==
There are 24 clubs in this division. Each club plays each of the others twice. Three points are awarded for a win, one for a draw, and none for a loss. At the end of the season a table of the final League standings is determined, based on the following criteria in this order: points obtained, goal difference, goals scored, an aggregate of the results between two or more clubs (ranked using the previous three criteria), most matches won, most goals scored away from home, fewest "penalty points" based on yellow and red cards received, followed by fewest straight red cards for certain offences. If two or more teams are still tied after examining all of these criteria, they will share the higher place between them. The only exception would be if the tied teams span the boundary between 2nd and 3rd, 6th and 7th, or 20th and 21st place, in which case one or more play-off matches would be arranged between the tied clubs.

At the end of each season the top two clubs, together with the winner of the play-offs between the clubs which finished in the third to sixth positions, are promoted to the EFL Championship and are replaced by the three clubs that finished at the bottom of that division.

The four clubs that finish at the bottom of EFL League One are relegated to EFL League Two. They are replaced by the top three clubs and the club that won the fourth to seventh place play-offs in League Two.

Locations of the 2026–27 EFL League One teams
Greater London 2026–27 EFL League One football clubs

Note: Table lists in alphabetical order.

| Team | Location | Stadium | Capacity |
|---|---|---|---|
| AFC Wimbledon | London (Wimbledon) | Plough Lane | 9,215 |
| Barnsley | Barnsley | Oakwell | 23,287 |
| Blackpool | Blackpool | Bloomfield Road | 16,500 |
| Bradford City | Bradford | Valley Parade | 24,840 |
| Bromley | London (Bromley) | Hayes Lane | 6,100 |
| Burton Albion | Burton upon Trent | Pirelli Stadium | 6,912 |
| Cambridge United | Cambridge | Abbey Stadium | 7,937 |
| Doncaster Rovers | Doncaster | Eco-Power Stadium | 15,231 |
| Huddersfield Town | Huddersfield | Kirklees Stadium | 24,121 |
| Leicester City | Leicester | King Power Stadium | 32,259 |
| Leyton Orient | London (Leyton) | Brisbane Road | 9,271 |
| Luton Town | Luton | Kenilworth Road | 12,056 |
| Mansfield Town | Mansfield | Field Mill | 10,022 |
| Milton Keynes Dons | Milton Keynes | Stadium MK | 30,500 |
| Notts County | Nottingham | Meadow Lane | 19,841 |
| Oxford United | Oxford | Kassam Stadium | 12,500 |
| Peterborough United | Peterborough | London Road Stadium | 15,314 |
| Plymouth Argyle | Plymouth | Home Park | 17,900 |
| Reading | Reading | Madejski Stadium | 24,161 |
| Sheffield Wednesday | Sheffield (Hillsborough) | Hillsborough Stadium | 39,732 |
| Stevenage | Stevenage | Broadhall Way | 7,318 |
| Stockport County | Stockport (Edgeley) | Edgeley Park | 10,852 |
| Wigan Athletic | Wigan | Brick Community Stadium | 25,138 |
| Wycombe Wanderers | High Wycombe | Adams Park | 10,446 |

== Teams promoted from League One ==
| Season | Winner | Runner-up | Promoted Play-off Winner (Position) |
|---|---|---|---|
| 2004–05 | Luton Town 98 | Hull City 86 | Sheffield Wednesday 72 (5th) |
| 2005–06 | Southend United 82 | Colchester United 79 | Barnsley 72 (5th) |
| 2006–07 | Scunthorpe United 91 | Bristol City 85 | Blackpool 83 (3rd) |
| 2007–08 | Swansea City 92 | Nottingham Forest 82 | Doncaster Rovers 80 (3rd) |
| 2008–09 | Leicester City 96 | Peterborough United 89 | Scunthorpe United 76 (6th) |
| 2009–10 | Norwich City 95 | Leeds United 86 | Millwall 85 (3rd) |
| 2010–11 | Brighton & Hove Albion 95 | Southampton 92 | Peterborough United 79 (4th) |
| 2011–12 | Charlton Athletic 101 | Sheffield Wednesday 93 | Huddersfield Town 81 (4th) |
| 2012–13 | Doncaster Rovers 84 | AFC Bournemouth 83 | Yeovil Town 77 (4th) |
| 2013–14 | Wolverhampton Wanderers 103 | Brentford 94 | Rotherham United 86 (4th) |
| 2014–15 | Bristol City 99 | Milton Keynes Dons 91 | Preston North End 89 (3rd) |
| 2015–16 | Wigan Athletic 87 | Burton Albion 85 | Barnsley 74 (6th) |
| 2016–17 | Sheffield United 100 | Bolton Wanderers 86 | Millwall 73 (6th) |
| 2017–18 | Wigan Athletic 98 | Blackburn Rovers 96 | Rotherham United 79 (4th) |
| 2018–19 | Luton Town 94 | Barnsley 91 | Charlton Athletic 88 (3rd) |
| 2019–20 ^{[a]} | Coventry City 67 | Rotherham United 62 | Wycombe Wanderers 59 (3rd) |
| 2020–21 | Hull City 89 | Peterborough United 87 | Blackpool 80 (3rd) |
| 2021–22 | Wigan Athletic 92 | Rotherham United 90 | Sunderland 84 (5th) |
| 2022–23 | Plymouth Argyle 101 | Ipswich Town 98 | Sheffield Wednesday 96 (3rd) |
| 2023–24 | Portsmouth 97 | Derby County 92 | Oxford United 77 (5th) |
| 2024–25 | Birmingham City 111 | Wrexham 92 | Charlton Athletic 85 (4th) |
| 2025–26 | Lincoln City 103 | Cardiff City 91 | Bolton Wanderers 75 (5th) |

For past winners at this level before 2004, see List of winners of the EFL League One and predecessors.

^{a} Season cancelled due to the COVID-19 pandemic in the United Kingdom.

== Play-off results ==
| Season | Semi-final (1st Leg) | Semi-final (2nd Leg) | Final |
|---|---|---|---|
| 2004–05 | Sheffield Wednesday 1–0 Brentford; Hartlepool United 2–0 Tranmere Rovers | Brentford 1–2 Sheffield Wednesday; Tranmere Rovers 2–0 Hartlepool United (Hartlepool won 6–5 on penalties, a.e.t.) | Sheffield Wednesday 4–2 Hartlepool United (a.e.t.) |
| 2005–06 | Barnsley 0–1 Huddersfield Town; Swansea City 1–1 Brentford | Huddersfield Town 1–3 Barnsley; Brentford 0–2 Swansea City | Barnsley 2–2 Swansea City (Barnsley won 4–3 on penalties, a.e.t.) |
| 2006–07 | Yeovil Town 0–2 Nottingham Forest; Oldham Athletic 1–2 Blackpool | Nottingham Forest 2–5 Yeovil Town (a.e.t.); Blackpool 3–1 Oldham Athletic | Blackpool 2–0 Yeovil Town |
| 2007–08 | Southend United 0–0 Doncaster Rovers; Leeds United 1–2 Carlisle United | Doncaster Rovers 5–1 Southend United; Carlisle United 0–2 Leeds United | Leeds United 0–1 Doncaster Rovers |
| 2008–09 | Scunthorpe United 1–1 Milton Keynes Dons; Millwall 1–0 Leeds United | Milton Keynes Dons 0–0 Scunthorpe United (Scunthorpe won 7–6 on penalties, a.e.t.); Leeds United 1–1 Millwall | Scunthorpe United 3–2 Millwall |
| 2009–10 | Swindon Town 2–1 Charlton Athletic; Huddersfield Town 0–0 Millwall | Charlton Athletic 2–1 Swindon Town (Swindon won 5–4 on penalties, a.e.t.); Millwall 2–0 Huddersfield Town | Millwall 1–0 Swindon Town |
| 2010–11 | AFC Bournemouth 1–1 Huddersfield Town; Milton Keynes Dons 3–2 Peterborough United | Huddersfield Town 3–3 AFC Bournemouth (Huddersfield won 4–2 on penalties, a.e.t.); Peterborough United 2–0 Milton Keynes Dons | Huddersfield Town 0–3 Peterborough United |
| 2011–12 | Stevenage 0–0 Sheffield United; Milton Keynes Dons 0–2 Huddersfield Town | Sheffield United 1–0 Stevenage; Huddersfield Town 1–2 Milton Keynes Dons | Huddersfield Town 0–0 Sheffield United (Huddersfield won 8–7 on penalties, a.e.t.) |
| 2012–13 | Sheffield United 1–0 Yeovil Town; Swindon Town 1–1 Brentford | Yeovil Town 2–0 Sheffield United; Brentford 3–3 Swindon Town (Brentford won 5–4 on penalties, a.e.t.) | Brentford 1–2 Yeovil Town |
| 2013–14 | Peterborough United 1–1 Leyton Orient; Preston North End 1–1 Rotherham United | Leyton Orient 2–1 Peterborough United; Rotherham United 3–1 Preston North End | Leyton Orient 2–2 Rotherham United (Rotherham won 4–3 on penalties, a.e.t.) |
| 2014–15 | Chesterfield 0–1 Preston North End; Sheffield United 1–2 Swindon Town | Preston North End 3–0 Chesterfield; Swindon Town 5–5 Sheffield United | Preston North End 4–0 Swindon Town |
| 2015–16 | Barnsley 3–0 Walsall; Bradford City 1–3 Millwall | Walsall 1–3 Barnsley; Millwall 1–1 Bradford City | Barnsley 3–1 Millwall |
| 2016–17 | Millwall 0–0 Scunthorpe United; Bradford City 1–0 Fleetwood Town | Scunthorpe United 2–3 Millwall; Fleetwood Town 0–0 Bradford City | Bradford City 0–1 Millwall |
| 2017–18 | Charlton Athletic 0–1 Shrewsbury Town; Scunthorpe United 2–2 Rotherham United | Shrewsbury Town 1–0 Charlton Athletic; Rotherham United 2–0 Scunthorpe United | Rotherham United 2–1 Shrewsbury Town (a.e.t.) |
| 2018–19 | Doncaster Rovers 1–2 Charlton Athletic; Sunderland 1–0 Portsmouth | Charlton Athletic 2–3 Doncaster Rovers (Charlton Athletic won 4–3 on penalties, a.e.t.); Portsmouth 0–0 Sunderland | Charlton Athletic 2–1 Sunderland |
| 2019–20 | Portsmouth 1–1 Oxford United; Fleetwood Town 1–4 Wycombe Wanderers | Oxford United 1–1 Portsmouth (Oxford United won 5–4 on penalties, a.e.t.); Wycombe Wanderers 2–2 Fleetwood Town | Oxford United 1–2 Wycombe Wanderers |
| 2020–21 | Oxford United 0–3 Blackpool; Lincoln City 2–0 Sunderland | Blackpool 3–3 Oxford United; Sunderland 2–1 Lincoln City | Blackpool 2–1 Lincoln City |
| 2021–22 | Wycombe Wanderers 2–0 Milton Keynes Dons; Sunderland 1–0 Sheffield Wednesday | Milton Keynes Dons 1–0 Wycombe Wanderers; Sheffield Wednesday 1–1 Sunderland | Sunderland 2–0 Wycombe Wanderers |
| 2022–23 | Peterborough United 4–0 Sheffield Wednesday; Bolton Wanderers 1–1 Barnsley | Sheffield Wednesday 5–1 Peterborough United (Sheffield Wednesday won 5–3 on penalties, a.e.t.); Barnsley 1–0 Bolton Wanderers | Sheffield Wednesday 1–0 Barnsley (a.e.t.) |
| 2023–24 | Barnsley 1–3 Bolton Wanderers; Oxford United 1–0 Peterborough United | Bolton Wanderers 2–3 Barnsley; Peterborough United 1–1 Oxford United | Bolton Wanderers 0–2 Oxford United |
| 2024–25 | Leyton Orient 2–2 Stockport County; Wycombe Wanderers 0–0 Charlton Athletic | Stockport County 1–1 Leyton Orient (Leyton Orient won 4–1 on penalties, a.e.t.); Charlton Athletic 1–0 Wycombe Wanderers | Charlton Athletic 1–0 Leyton Orient |
| 2025–26 | Stevenage 0–1 Stockport County; Bolton Wanderers 1–0 Bradford City | Stockport County 2–0 Stevenage; Bradford City 0–1 Bolton Wanderers | Bolton Wanderers 4–1 Stockport County |

== Relegated teams ==
| Season | Clubs |
|---|---|
| 2004–05 | Torquay United (51), Wrexham (43), Peterborough United (39), Stockport County (26) |
| 2005–06 | Hartlepool United (50), Milton Keynes Dons (50), Swindon Town (48), Walsall (47) |
| 2006–07 | Chesterfield (47), Bradford City (47), Rotherham United (38), Brentford (37) |
| 2007–08 | AFC Bournemouth (48), Gillingham (46), Port Vale (38), Luton Town (33) |
| 2008–09 | Northampton Town (49), Crewe Alexandra (46), Cheltenham Town (39), Hereford United (34) |
| 2009–10 | Gillingham (50), Wycombe Wanderers (45), Southend United (43), Stockport County (25) |
| 2010–11 | Dagenham & Redbridge (47), Bristol Rovers (45), Plymouth Argyle (42), Swindon Town (41) |
| 2011–12 | Wycombe Wanderers (43), Chesterfield (42), Exeter City (42), Rochdale (38) |
| 2012–13 | Scunthorpe United (48), Bury (41), Hartlepool United (41), Portsmouth (32) |
| 2013–14 | Tranmere Rovers (47), Carlisle United (45), Shrewsbury Town (42), Stevenage (42) |
| 2014–15 | Notts County (50), Crawley Town (50), Leyton Orient (49), Yeovil Town (40) |
| 2015–16 | Doncaster Rovers (46), Blackpool (46), Colchester United (40), Crewe Alexandra (34) |
| 2016–17 | Port Vale (49), Swindon Town (44), Coventry City (39), Chesterfield (37) |
| 2017–18 | Oldham Athletic (50), Northampton Town (47), Milton Keynes Dons (45), Bury (36) |
| 2018–19 | Plymouth Argyle (50), Walsall (47), Scunthorpe United (46), Bradford City (41) |
| 2019–20 | Tranmere Rovers (32), Southend United (19), Bolton Wanderers (14), Bury^{[a]} |
| 2020–21 | Rochdale (47), Northampton Town (45), Swindon Town (43), Bristol Rovers (38) |
| 2021–22 | Gillingham (40), Doncaster Rovers (38), AFC Wimbledon (37), Crewe Alexandra (29) |
| 2022–23 | Milton Keynes Dons (45), Morecambe (44), Accrington Stanley (44), Forest Green Rovers (27) |
| 2023–24 | Cheltenham Town (44), Fleetwood Town (43), Port Vale (41), Carlisle United (30) |
| 2024–25 | Crawley Town (46), Bristol Rovers (43), Cambridge United (38), Shrewsbury Town (33) |
| 2025–26 | Exeter City (49), Port Vale (42), Rotherham United (41), Northampton Town (35) |

^{a} Expelled in August 2019 after financial breaches.

== Top scorers ==
| Season | Top scorer(s) | Club(s) | Goals |
|---|---|---|---|
| 2004–05 | (Northern Ireland) Stuart Elliott | Hull City | 27 |
| 2004–05 | (England) Dean Windass | Bradford City | 27 |
| 2005–06 | (Wales) Freddy Eastwood | Southend United | 23 |
| 2005–06 | (England) Billy Sharp | Scunthorpe United | 23 |
| 2006–07 | (England) Billy Sharp | Scunthorpe United | 30 |
| 2007–08 | (Trinidad and Tobago) Jason Scotland | Swansea City | 24 |
| 2008–09 | (Republic of Ireland) Simon Cox | Swindon Town | 29 |
| 2008–09 | (England) Rickie Lambert | Bristol Rovers | 29 |
| 2009–10 | (England) Rickie Lambert | Southampton | 30 |
| 2010–11 | (Scotland) Craig Mackail-Smith | Peterborough United | 27 |
| 2011–12 | (Scotland) Jordan Rhodes | Huddersfield Town | 36 |
| 2012–13 | (Republic of Ireland) Paddy Madden | Yeovil Town | 22 |
| 2013–14 | (England) Sam Baldock | Bristol City | 24 |
| 2014–15 | (England) Joe Garner | Preston North End | 26 |
| 2015–16 | (Northern Ireland) Will Grigg | Wigan Athletic | 25 |
| 2016–17 | (England) Billy Sharp | Sheffield United | 30 |
| 2017–18 | (England) Jack Marriott | Peterborough United | 27 |
| 2018–19 | (Republic of Ireland) James Collins | Luton Town | 25 |
| 2019–20 | (England) Ivan Toney | Peterborough United | 24^{[b]} |
| 2020–21 | (England) Jonson Clarke-Harris | Peterborough United | 31 |
| 2021–22 | (Republic of Ireland) Will Keane | Wigan Athletic | 26 |
| 2022–23 | (England) Conor Chaplin | Ipswich Town | 26 |
| 2022–23 | (England) Jonson Clarke-Harris | Peterborough United | 26 |
| 2023–24 | (England) Alfie May | Charlton Athletic | 23 |
| 2024–25 | (United States) Charlie Kelman | Leyton Orient | 21 |
| 2025–26 | (England) Dom Ballard | Leyton Orient | 23 |

^{b} In 35 games. Season truncated because of coronavirus.

== Attendances ==

EFL League One is the most-watched third-tier domestic sports league in the world, with an average of 10,613 spectators per game in the 2022–23 season, also making it one of the top ten most watched leagues in Europe. The closest third-tier association football league in terms of average attendance is the Germany 3. Liga (8,219).

The highest average attendance since the restructure into League One was the 2022–23 season, when over 5.3 million spectators watched games, with an average of 10,613 per game. The highest average attendance by a single club was Sunderland in the 2018–19 season with 32,157. They also set the League One attendance record for a single game in the same season, when 46,039 spectators attended the Boxing Day game against Bradford City.

| Season | League Average Attendance | Highest Average | | Highest Attendance | |
| Season | League Average Attendance | Club | Attendance | Game | Attendance |
|---|---|---|---|---|---|
| 2004–05 | 7,732 | Sheffield Wednesday | 23,100 | Sheffield Wednesday vs Bristol City | 28,798 |
| 2005–06 | 7,578 | Nottingham Forest | 20,257 | Nottingham Forest v Bournemouth | 26,847 |
| 2006–07 | 7,486 | Nottingham Forest | 20,627 | Nottingham Forest v Rotherham United | 27,875 |
| 2007–08 | 7,985 | Leeds United | 26,546 | Leeds United v Gillingham | 38,256 |
| 2008–09 | 7,551 | Leeds United | 23,639 | | |
| 2009–10 | 9,136 | Leeds United | 24,818 | Leeds United v Bristol Rovers | 38,234 |
| 2010–11 | 7,519 | Southampton | 22,161 | Southampton v Walsall | 31,653 |
| 2011–12 | 7,358 | Sheffield Wednesday | 21,336 | Sheffield Wednesday v Wycombe Wanderers | 38,082 |
| 2012–13 | 6,335 | Sheffield United | 18,612 | Sheffield United v Brentford | 23,431 |
| 2013–14 | 7,476 | Wolverhampton Wanderers | 20,879 | Wolverhampton Wanderers v Rotherham United | 30,110 |
| 2014–15 | 7,037 | Sheffield United | 19,805 | Coventry City v Gillingham | 27,306 |
| 2015–16 | 7,163 | Sheffield United | 19,803 | Sheffield United v Bradford City | 24,777 |
| 2016–17 | 7,933 | Sheffield United | 21,892 | Sheffield United v Chesterfield | 31,003 |
| 2017–18 | 7,805 | Bradford City | 19,787 | Blackburn Rovers v Oxford United | 27,600 |
| 2018–19 | 8,741 | Sunderland | 32,157 | Sunderland v Bradford City | 46,039 |
| 2019–20 | 8,802 | Sunderland | 30,118 | Sunderland v Bolton Wanderers | 33,821 |
| 2020–21 | No attendances because of COVID-19 pandemic | | | | |
| 2021–22 | 9,953 | Sunderland | 30,847 | Sunderland v Doncaster Rovers | 38,395 |
| 2022–23 | 10,613 | Derby County | 27,259 | Sheffield Wednesday v Plymouth Argyle | 33,442 |
| 2023–24 | 9,711 | Derby County | 27,278 | Derby County v Bolton Wanderers | 32,538 |
| 2024–25 | 10,040 | Birmingham City | 26,283 | Birmingham City v Reading | 27,985 |
| 2025–26 | 10,522 | Bolton Wanderers | 21,692 | Cardiff City v Lincoln City | 27,280 |

== Historic performance ==
Since the restructuring into League One in 2004, 79 teams have spent at least one season in the division, including 9 of the 20 teams in the 2026–27 Premier League. Milton Keynes Dons and Peterborough United have both spent 16 seasons in League One, the most of any team. Oldham Athletic's single 14-season consecutive spell was the longest of any team. The team with the current longest tenure is Burton Albion, who will be in their ninth consecutive season in the division, having been in League One since the 2018–19 season. Rotherham United have had the highest number of separate spells in League One with six. There have been 19 different Champions of League One, with Wigan Athletic having won the division three times, with the current points record being held by Birmingham City with a total of 111 points accumulated over the 2024–25 season.

Rotherham United have been promoted out of League One the most times on four occasions, with five teams (Barnsley, Charlton Athletic, Peterborough United, Sheffield Wednesday and Wigan Athletic) having been promoted on three occasions. Northampton Town, Port Vale and Swindon Town have been relegated from League One the most times on four occasions, with five teams (Bristol Rovers, Chesterfield, Crewe Alexandra, Gillingham and Milton Keynes Dons) having been relegated on three occasions.

Key

- † Teams with this background and symbol in the "Club" column will be competing in the 2026–27 EFL League One
- ‡ Team will be competing in the 2026–27 Premier League
- The club competed in League One during that season (the number is the club's final league position)

| Club | Total Seasons | Number of Spells | Longest Spell (Seasons) | Highest Position | Lowest Position | Season | | | | | | | | | | | | | | | | | | | | | | | | | | | | | | | | | |
| Club | Total Seasons | Number of Spells | Longest Spell (Seasons) | Highest Position | Lowest Position | 2004–05 | 2005–06 | 2006–07 | 2007–08 | 2008–09 | 2009–10 | 2010–11 | 2011–12 | 2012–13 | 2013–14 | 2014–15 | 2015–16 | 2016–17 | 2017–18 | 2018–19 | 2019–20 | 2020–21 | 2021–22 | 2022–23 | 2023–24 | 2024–25 | 2025–26 | 2026–27 | | | | | | | | | | | |
|---|---|---|---|---|---|---|---|---|---|---|---|---|---|---|---|---|---|---|---|---|---|---|---|---|---|---|---|---|---|---|---|---|---|---|---|---|---|---|---|
| Club | Total Seasons | Number of Spells | Longest Spell (Seasons) | Highest Position | Lowest Position | 2004–05 | 2005–06 | 2006–07 | 2007–08 | 2008–09 | 2009–10 | 2010–11 | 2011–12 | 2012–13 | 2013–14 | 2014–15 | 2015–16 | 2016–17 | 2017–18 | 2018–19 | 2019–20 | 2020–21 | 2021–22 | 2022–23 | 2023–24 | 2024–25 | 2025–26 | 2026–27 | Accrington Stanley | 5 | 1 | 5 | 11 | 23 | 14 | 17 | 11 | 12 | 23 |
| AFC Bournemouth ‡ | 7 | 2 | 4 | 2 | 21 | 8 | 17 | 19 | 21 | | | 6 | 11 | 2 | | | | | | | | | | | | | | | | | | | | | | | | | |
| AFC Wimbledon † | 8 | 2 | 6 | 15 | 23 | | | | | | | | | | | | | 15 | 18 | 20 | 20 | 19 | 23 | | | | 19 | | | | | | | | | | | | |
| Barnsley † | 10 | 4 | 5 | 2 | 15 | 13 | 5 | | | | | | | | | 11 | 6 | | | 2 | | | | 4 | 6 | 12 | 15 | | | | | | | | | | | | |
| Birmingham City | 1 | 1 | 1 | 1 | 1 | | | | | | | | | | | | | | | | | | | | | 1 | | | | | | | | | | | | | |
| Blackburn Rovers | 1 | 1 | 1 | 2 | 2 | | | | | | | | | | | | | | 2 | | | | | | | | | | | | | | | | | | | | |
| Blackpool † | 12 | 4 | 4 | 3 | 22 | 16 | 19 | 3 | | | | | | | | | 22 | | 12 | 10 | 13 | 3 | | | 8 | 9 | 13 | | | | | | | | | | | | |
| Bolton Wanderers | 7 | 3 | 5 | 2 | 23 | | | | | | | | | | | | | 2 | | | 23 | | 9 | 5 | 3 | 8 | 5 | | | | | | | | | | | | |
| Bradford City † | 11 | 3 | 6 | 4 | 24 | 11 | 11 | 22 | | | | | | | 11 | 7 | 5 | 5 | 11 | 24 | | | | | | | 4 | | | | | | | | | | | | |
| Brentford ‡ | 8 | 2 | 5 | 2 | 24 | 4 | 3 | 24 | | | 9 | 11 | 9 | 3 | 2 | | | | | | | | | | | | | | | | | | | | | | | | |
| Brighton & Hove Albion ‡ | 5 | 1 | 5 | 1 | 18 | | | 18 | 7 | 16 | 13 | 1 | | | | | | | | | | | | | | | | | | | | | | | | | | | |
| Bristol City | 5 | 2 | 3 | 1 | 12 | 7 | 9 | 2 | | | | | | | 12 | 1 | | | | | | | | | | | | | | | | | | | | | | | |
| Bristol Rovers | 12 | 3 | 5 | 10 | 24 | | | | 16 | 11 | 11 | 22 | | | | | | 10 | 13 | 15 | 14 | 24 | | 17 | 15 | 22 | | | | | | | | | | | | | |
| Bromley † | 1 | 1 | 1 | | | | | | | | | | | | | | | | | | | | | | | | | | | | | | | | | | | | |
| Burton Albion † | 10 | 2 | 9 | 2 | 20 | | | | | | | | | | | | 2 | | | 9 | 12 | 16 | 16 | 15 | 20 | 20 | 17 | | | | | | | | | | | | |
| Bury | 6 | 3 | 3 | 14 | 24 | | | | | | | | 14 | 22 | | | 16 | 19 | 24 | | 24 (Note: Bury did not compete in the 2019-20 season as they were expelled from the league because of financial difficulties.) | | | | | | | | | | | | | | | | | | |
| Cambridge United † | 5 | 2 | 4 | 14 | 23 | | | | | | | | | | | | | | | | | | 14 | 20 | 18 | 23 | | | | | | | | | | | | | |
| Cardiff City | 1 | 1 | 1 | 2 | 2 | | | | | | | | | | | | | | | | | | | | | | 2 | | | | | | | | | | | | |
| Carlisle United | 9 | 2 | 8 | 4 | 24 | | | 8 | 4 | 20 | 14 | 12 | 8 | 17 | 22 | | | | | | | | | | 24 | | | | | | | | | | | | | | |
| Charlton Athletic | 10 | 3 | 5 | 1 | 16 | | | | | | 4 | 13 | 1 | | | | | 13 | 6 | 3 | | 7 | 13 | 10 | 16 | 4 | | | | | | | | | | | | | |
| Cheltenham Town | 6 | 2 | 3 | 15 | 23 | | | 17 | 19 | 23 | | | | | | | | | | | | | 15 | 16 | 21 | | | | | | | | | | | | | | |
| Chesterfield | 7 | 3 | 3 | 6 | 24 | 17 | 16 | 21 | | | | | 22 | | | 6 | 18 | 24 | | | | | | | | | | | | | | | | | | | | | |
| Colchester United | 10 | 2 | 8 | 2 | 23 | 15 | 2 | | | 12 | 8 | 10 | 10 | 20 | 16 | 19 | 23 | | | | | | | | | | | | | | | | | | | | | | |
| Coventry City ‡ | 7 | 2 | 5 | 1 | 23 | | | | | | | | | 15 | 18 | 17 | 8 | 23 | | 8 | 1 | | | | | | | | | | | | | | | | | | |
| Crawley Town | 4 | 2 | 3 | 10 | 22 | | | | | | | | | 10 | 14 | 22 | | | | | | | | | | 21 | | | | | | | | | | | | | |
| Crewe Alexandra | 9 | 3 | 4 | 12 | 24 | | | 13 | 20 | 22 | | | | 13 | 19 | 20 | 24 | | | | | 12 | 24 | | | | | | | | | | | | | | | | |
| Dagenham & Redbridge | 1 | 1 | 2 | 21 | 21 | | | | | | | 21 | | | | | | | | | | | | | | | | | | | | | | | | | | | |
| Derby County | 2 | 1 | 2 | 2 | 7 | | | | | | | | | | | | | | | | | | | 7 | 2 | | | | | | | | | | | | | | |
| Doncaster Rovers † | 14 | 5 | 5 | 1 | 22 | 10 | 8 | 11 | 3 | | | | | 1 | | 13 | 21 | | 15 | 6 | 9 | 14 | 22 | | | | 14 | | | | | | | | | | | | |
| Exeter City | 7 | 2 | 4 | 8 | 23 | | | | | | 18 | 8 | 23 | | | | | | | | | | | 14 | 13 | 16 | 21 | | | | | | | | | | | | |
| Fleetwood Town | 10 | 1 | 10 | 4 | 22 | | | | | | | | | | | 10 | 19 | 4 | 14 | 11 | 6 | 15 | 20 | 13 | 22 | | | | | | | | | | | | | | |
| Forest Green Rovers | 1 | 1 | 1 | 24 | 24 | | | | | | | | | | | | | | | | | | | 24 | | | | | | | | | | | | | | | |
| Gillingham | 13 | 3 | 9 | 9 | 22 | | 14 | 16 | 22 | | 21 | | | | 17 | 12 | 9 | 20 | 17 | 13 | 10 | 10 | 21 | | | | | | | | | | | | | | | | |
| Hartlepool United | 8 | 2 | 6 | 6 | 23 | 6 | 21 | | 15 | 19 | 20 | 16 | 13 | 23 | | | | | | | | | | | | | | | | | | | | | | | | | |
| Hereford United | 1 | 1 | 1 | 24 | 24 | | | | | 24 | | | | | | | | | | | | | | | | | | | | | | | | | | | | | |
| Huddersfield Town † | 11 | 2 | 8 | 3 | 15 | 9 | 4 | 15 | 10 | 9 | 6 | 3 | 4 | | | | | | | | | | | | | 10 | 9 | | | | | | | | | | | | |
| Hull City ‡ | 2 | 2 | 1 | 1 | 2 | 2 | | | | | | | | | | | | | | | | 1 | | | | | | | | | | | | | | | | | |
| Ipswich Town ‡ | 4 | 1 | 4 | 2 | 11 | | | | | | | | | | | | | | | | 11 | 9 | 11 | 2 | | | | | | | | | | | | | | | |
| Leeds United ‡ | 3 | 1 | 3 | 2 | 5 | | | | 5 | 4 | 2 | | | | | | | | | | | | | | | | | | | | | | | | | | | | |
| Leicester City † | 2 | 2 | 1 | 1 | 1 | | | | | 1 | | | | | | | | | | | | | | | | | | | | | | | | | | | | | |
| Leyton Orient † | 13 | 2 | 9 | 3 | 23 | | | 20 | 14 | 14 | 17 | 7 | 20 | 7 | 3 | 23 | | | | | | | | | 11 | 6 | 20 | | | | | | | | | | | | |
| Lincoln City | 7 | 1 | 7 | 1 | 17 | | | | | | | | | | | | | | | | 16 | 5 | 17 | 11 | 7 | 11 | 1 | | | | | | | | | | | | |
| Luton Town † | 5 | 4 | 2 | 1 | 24 | 1 | | | 24 | | | | | | | | | | | 1 | | | | | | | 7 | | | | | | | | | | | | |
| Mansfield Town † | 3 | 1 | 3 | 10 | 17 | | | | | | | | | | | | | | | | | | | | | 17 | 10 | | | | | | | | | | | | |
| Millwall | 6 | 2 | 4 | 3 | 17 | | | 10 | 17 | 5 | 3 | | | | | | 4 | 6 | | | | | | | | | | | | | | | | | | | | | |
| MK Dons † | 16 | 5 | 7 | 2 | 23 | 20 | 22 | | | 3 | 12 | 5 | 5 | 8 | 10 | 2 | | 12 | 23 | | 19 | 13 | 3 | 21 | | | | | | | | | | | | | | | |
| Morecambe | 2 | 1 | 2 | 19 | 22 | | | | | | | | | | | | | | | | | | 19 | 22 | | | | | | | | | | | | | | | |
| Northampton Town | 9 | 4 | 3 | 9 | 24 | | | 14 | 9 | 21 | | | | | | | | 16 | 22 | | | 22 | | | 14 | 19 | 24 | | | | | | | | | | | | |
| Norwich City | 1 | 1 | 1 | 1 | 1 | | | | | | 1 | | | | | | | | | | | | | | | | | | | | | | | | | | | | |
| Nottingham Forest ‡ | 3 | 1 | 3 | 2 | 7 | | 7 | 4 | 2 | | | | | | | | | | | | | | | | | | | | | | | | | | | | | | |
| Notts County † | 6 | 2 | 5 | 7 | 21 | | | | | | | 19 | 7 | 12 | 20 | 21 | | | | | | | | | | | | | | | | | | | | | | | |
| Oldham Athletic | 14 | 1 | 14 | 6 | 21 | 19 | 10 | 6 | 8 | 10 | 16 | 17 | 16 | 19 | 15 | 15 | 17 | 17 | 21 | | | | | | | | | | | | | | | | | | | | |
| Oxford United † | 9 | 2 | 8 | 4 | 19 | | | | | | | | | | | | | 8 | 16 | 12 | 4 | 6 | 8 | 19 | 5 | | | | | | | | | | | | | | |
| Peterborough United † | 16 | 5 | 8 | 2 | 23 | 23 | | | | 2 | | 4 | | | 6 | 9 | 13 | 11 | 9 | 7 | 7 | 2 | | 6 | 4 | 18 | 18 | | | | | | | | | | | | |
| Plymouth Argyle † | 8 | 4 | 3 | 1 | 23 | | | | | | | 23 | | | | | | | 7 | 21 | | 18 | 7 | 1 | | | 8 | | | | | | | | | | | | |
| Port Vale | 11 | 4 | 4 | 9 | 23 | 18 | 13 | 12 | 23 | | | | | | 9 | 18 | 12 | 21 | | | | | | 18 | 23 | | 22 | | | | | | | | | | | | |
| Portsmouth | 8 | 2 | 7 | 1 | 24 | | | | | | | | | 24 | | | | | 8 | 4 | 5 | 8 | 10 | 8 | 1 | | | | | | | | | | | | | | |
| Preston North End | 4 | 1 | 4 | 3 | 15 | | | | | | | | 15 | 14 | 5 | 3 | | | | | | | | | | | | | | | | | | | | | | | |
| Reading † | 4 | 1 | 4 | 7 | 17 | | | | | | | | | | | | | | | | | | | | 17 | 7 | 12 | | | | | | | | | | | | |
| Rochdale | 9 | 2 | 7 | 8 | 24 | | | | | | | 9 | 24 | | | 8 | 10 | 9 | 20 | 16 | 18 | 21 | | | | | | | | | | | | | | | | | |
| Rotherham United | 8 | 6 | 2 | 2 | 23 | | 20 | 23 | | | | | | | 4 | | | | 4 | | 2 | | 2 | | | 13 | 23 | | | | | | | | | | | | |
| Scunthorpe United | 10 | 4 | 5 | 1 | 23 | | 12 | 1 | | 6 | | | 18 | 21 | | 16 | 7 | 3 | 5 | 23 | | | | | | | | | | | | | | | | | | | |
| Sheffield United | 6 | 1 | 6 | 1 | 11 | | | | | | | | 3 | 5 | 7 | 5 | 11 | 1 | | | | | | | | | | | | | | | | | | | | | |
| Sheffield Wednesday † | 6 | 4 | 2 | 2 | 15 | 5 | | | | | | 15 | 2 | | | | | | | | | | 4 | 3 | | | | | | | | | | | | | | | |
| Shrewsbury Town | 12 | 2 | 10 | 3 | 24 | | | | | | | | | 16 | 24 | | 20 | 18 | 3 | 18 | 15 | 17 | 18 | 12 | 19 | 24 | | | | | | | | | | | | | |
| Southampton | 2 | 1 | 2 | 2 | 7 | | | | | | 7 | 2 | | | | | | | | | | | | | | | | | | | | | | | | | | | |
| Southend United | 9 | 3 | 5 | 1 | 23 | | 1 | | 6 | 8 | 23 | | | | | | 14 | 7 | 10 | 19 | 22 | | | | | | | | | | | | | | | | | | |
| Stevenage † | 7 | 2 | 4 | 6 | 24 | | | | | | | | 6 | 18 | 24 | | | | | | | | | | 9 | 14 | 6 | | | | | | | | | | | | |
| Stockport County † | 6 | 3 | 3 | 3 | 24 | 24 | | | | 18 | 24 | | | | | | | | | | | | | | | 3 | 3 | | | | | | | | | | | | |
| Sunderland ‡ | 4 | 1 | 4 | 4 | 8 | | | | | | | | | | | | | | | 5 | 8 | 4 | 5 | | | | | | | | | | | | | | | | |
| Swansea City | 3 | 1 | 3 | 1 | 7 | | 6 | 7 | 1 | | | | | | | | | | | | | | | | | | | | | | | | | | | | | | |
| Swindon Town | 12 | 4 | 5 | 4 | 24 | 12 | 23 | | 13 | 15 | 5 | 24 | | 6 | 8 | 4 | 15 | 22 | | | | 23 | | | | | | | | | | | | | | | | | |
| Torquay United | 1 | 1 | 1 | 21 | 21 | 21 | | | | | | | | | | | | | | | | | | | | | | | | | | | | | | | | | |
| Tranmere Rovers | 11 | 2 | 10 | 3 | 21 | 3 | 18 | 9 | 11 | 7 | 19 | 18 | 12 | 11 | 21 | | | | | | 21 | | | | | | | | | | | | | | | | | | |
| Walsall | 14 | 2 | 12 | 3 | 24 | 14 | 24 | | 12 | 13 | 10 | 20 | 19 | 9 | 13 | 14 | 3 | 14 | 19 | 22 | | | | | | | | | | | | | | | | | | | |
| Wigan Athletic † | 8 | 4 | 4 | 1 | 20 | | | | | | | | | | | | 1 | | 1 | | | 20 | 1 | | 12 | 15 | 16 | | | | | | | | | | | | |
| Wolverhampton Wanderers | 1 | 1 | 1 | 1 | 1 | | | | | | | | | | 1 | | | | | | | | | | | | | | | | | | | | | | | | |
| Wrexham | 2 | 2 | 1 | 2 | 22 | 22 | | | | | | | | | | | | | | | | | | | | 2 | | | | | | | | | | | | | |
| Wycombe Wanderers † | 10 | 4 | 5 | 3 | 22 | | | | | | 22 | | 21 | | | | | | | 17 | 3 | | 6 | 9 | 10 | 5 | 11 | | | | | | | | | | | | |
| Yeovil Town | 9 | 2 | 8 | 4 | 24 | | 15 | 5 | 18 | 17 | 15 | 14 | 17 | 4 | | 24 | | | | | | | | | | | | | | | | | | | | | | | |

== Financial Fair Play ==
Beginning with the 2012–13 season, a Financial Fair Play arrangement has been in place in all three divisions of the Football League, the intention being eventually to produce a league of financially self-sustaining clubs. In League One, this takes the form of a Salary Cost Management Protocol in which a maximum of 60% of a club's turnover may be spent on players' wages, with sanctions being applied in the form of transfer embargoes.

== See also ==
- 1920–21 (as Football League Division Three)
- 1921–22 & 1957–58 (as Football League Division Three North/South)
- 1958–59 & 1992–93 (as Football League Division Three)
- 1992–93 & 2003–04 (as Football League Division Two)
- List of professional sports teams in the United Kingdom
