= Sports and Leisure Management =

Sports and Leisure Management Limited (SLM) is a leisure management company that was formed in Hinckley, Leicestershire, England in 1987. It trades under the name Everyone Active, which is its consumer brand. At present, the company manages over 200 leisure centres on the behalf of over 50 local authorities and trusts in England. It provides sports and leisure services to approximately 2.7million members and caters for 3.2million visitors each month.

As a leisure management company, its usual modus operandi is to bid for the rights to managing a wide variety of council-owned leisure properties, including swimming pools, gyms, outdoor athletics centres, outdoor football, hockey and tennis courts and sports halls. Most of its sites, however, have a combination of some or all of these facilities.

== History ==
Founded in 1987 by ex-CEO, Stephen Hulme, Everyone Active’s first centre in Hinckley, Leicestershire, opened in 1988, in partnership with Hinckley and Bosworth Council. Although the company no longer runs that centre, its headquarters are still located in this same Leicestershire town.

== Swimming ==
Of its 200-plus centres, the majority have at least one swimming pool, all of which host swimming lessons. Alongside the lessons, its pools also provide sessions for fitness swimming, fun swimming, inflatables and aqua aerobics sessions.

== Fitness ==
The company has approximately 128 gyms and fitness suites across its estate of over 160 centres, which include a variety of equipment, such as cardiovascular and weight-training apparatus. Customers can work out independently, as part of an instructor-led small group, or with a personal trainer.

Everyone Active also runs group exercise classes in around 120 of its centres.

== Activities ==
Many of Everyone Active’s centres also include sports halls, squash courts, tennis courts, climbing walls and outdoor football pitches – both artificial and grass – while some centres even include athletic facilities, ski slopes and a velodrome. All of these facilities are available to hire to the company’s members and members of the general public on a pay-as-you-go basis.

== Everyone Health ==
Everyone Health is the public health arm of Sports and Leisure Management. It provides health services – such as weight loss, mental health support and smoking cessation – on behalf of local authorities all over the country.

== Everyone Events ==
This branch of the company helps clients to organise a wide variety of events to be hosted at the company’s centres.
