= Majority Audio =

British electronics company in audio equipment

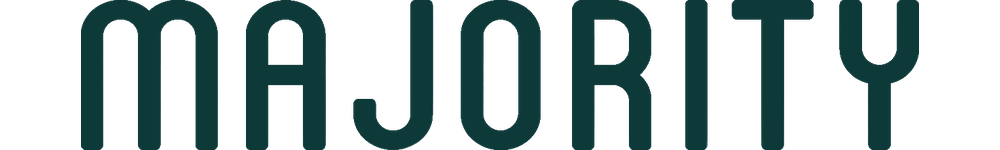
- Type: Private limited company
- Industry: Audio and video
- Founded: 2012
- Headquarters: Cambridge, England
- Area served: Europe; United States; Australasia
- Brands: Majority; Oakcastle
- Owner: Velocity Outlet Limited
- Website: https://majority.co.uk

Majority Audio, also known as Majority, is a British electronics company based in Cambridge that primarily manufactures audio equipment. Its products include soundbars, turntables and digital radios, as well as DVD players. Majority also market products under the brand Oakcastle.

== History ==
Eddie Latham and PJ Scott founded Velocity Outlet in 2012, beginning as a side business for selling products on eBay. The pair eventually launched its own branded line of products called Majority, the first product being Majority Verb wireless speaker in 2014. The company expanded to selling in the continental Europe market in 2018, followed by the US in 2020.

== Products ==
Majority has marketed a variety of audio products including portable, tabletop and Hi-Fi units for amps. The Majority Histon is a budget digital radio unit. Other radios include: the Little Shelford, Eversden (water resistant), and Petersfield (pocket sized).

All-in-one audio units for home, featuring radio, CD player and Bluetooth, have been made called Majority Oakington. In 2023, Majority launched the Bard and Quadriga connected home music systems.

Majority also markets portable media players. The Majority MP3 Player (later renamed Majority MP3 Go) is a small, low-cost player with 16GB memory, Bluetooth, and a clip, first released in 2023. Later the company released the MP3 Pro.

The company launched a budget turntable, Majority Moto, in 2024. It has an Audio-Technica cartridge.

The company also produces tech under the Oakcastle brand. These are slightly cheaper compared to Majority-branded products. Oakcastle also sell some non-audiovisual products such as budget mobile phones.
