= Reflo =

Sustainable apparel company in England

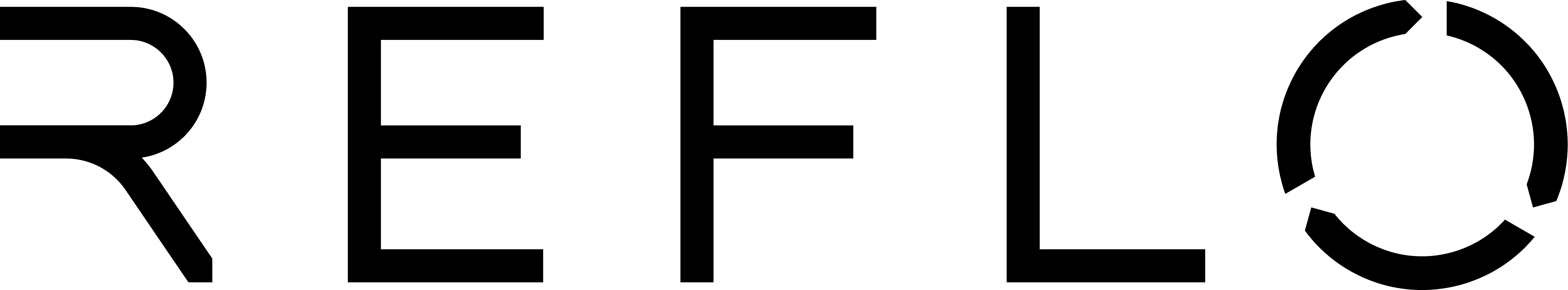
- Type: Private
- Industry: Sportswear
- Founded: 2021
- Founder: Rory MacFadyen; Peter Philippou
- Headquarters: Doncaster, England, United Kingdom
- Products: Golf & Performance Apparel
- Website: reflo.com

Reflo is a sustainable apparel company based in England, the United Kingdom.

== History ==
Reflo was founded in 2021 by Rory MacFadyen as a sustainable apparel company, using personal and private investor funds. Reflo apparel is predominantly made from recycled plastic waste, and is designed to meet the performance demands of high-level sporting activities. It uses only recycled or recyclable packaging, excludes single-use plastics from its supply chain, and complies with ethical labour practices. It has developed on a number of methods to offset the carbon footprint of its workforce and sponsored athletes. The company plants a tree for each product sold and is expected to plant a million trees by 2026.

In its initial year of operation, Reflo succeeded in recycling the equivalent of more than 140,000 plastic bottles. Additionally, the company contributed to environmental conservation by planting over 16,000 trees and offsetting 250 tonnes of carbon. The company has set the goal to plant 1 million trees and recycle the equivalent of 5 million plastic bottles in the first 5 years.

In November 2021, Reflo launched a multi-sport apparel line made from recycled plastic waste.

In March 2023, Reflo received the Drapers Den Award.

== Operations ==
Registered in Doncaster, Reflo operates remotely with staff across the UK, the Middle East and the Far East. Its founder, Rory MacFadyen, resides in Dubai.

== Production ==
Reflo's products are mostly produced in China. They are made from recycled polyester, including RPET, sourced from Far Eastern post-consumer waste. Its T-shirts feature Java-tek fabric, made from recycled coffee beans to enhance drying and odour management. It complies with the Business Social Compliance Initiative (BSCI), a standard ensuring fair wages, no child labour.

== Sportswear ==
Reflo launched with a sustainable clothing line focussed on active/training, golf and leisure pieces. The collection, consisting of 57 versatile items, meets multiple sustainability certifications, including the Global Recycled Standard, Bluesign, Oeko-Tex 100, and U Trust. Its products uses eco-friendly materials derived from recycled waste, including single-use plastic and coffee beans. Reflo also turns all unusable samples into up cycled products such as golf club head covers.

- Reflo Congo Polo Shirt
- Reflo Sidra trouser
- Reflo Lapter Hoody
- Reflo Sidra Chino Trousers
- Reflo Barents Mid Layer
- Reflo Bohai Polo Shirt
- Reflo Lapter hoodie

== Awards and recognition ==
- 2023: Drapers Sustainable Fashion Awards
- Drapers Den 2023 Winner

== Manufacturing ==
=== Football ===
==== Club teams ====
- (England) Forest Green Rovers
- (England) Luton Town

==== Players ====
- (England) Harry Kane

=== Motorsports ===
==== Formula 1 ====
- (United Kingdom) Atlassian Williams F1 Team

==== Formula E ====
- (United States) Andretti Formula E Team
- (United States) Cupra Kiro
- (United Kingdom) Jaguar TCS Racing
- (Japan) Nissan Formula E Team

==== IndyCar ====
- (United States) Andretti Global
