= 2015–16 Football League One =

Football League One
- Season: 2015–16
- Champions: Wigan Athletic (2nd divisional title)
- Promoted: Wigan Athletic; Burton Albion; Barnsley
- Relegated: Doncaster Rovers; Blackpool; Colchester United; Crewe Alexandra
- Matches: 552
- Goals: 1,457 (2.64 per match)
- Top goalscorer: Will Grigg (25 goals)
- Biggest home win: Chesterfield 7–1 Shrewsbury Town (2 January 2016); Coventry City 6–0 Bury (13 February 2016); Scunthorpe United 6–0 Swindon Town (28 March 2016)
- Biggest away win: Crewe Alexandra 0–5 Coventry City (2 January 2016)
- Longest winning run: Barnsley (7 matches)
- Longest unbeaten run: Wigan Athletic (20 matches)
- Longest winless run: Colchester United (19 matches)
- Longest losing run: Colchester United (9 matches)
- Highest attendance: 24,777; Sheffield United 3–1 Bradford City (28 December 2015)
- Lowest attendance: 1,767; Rochdale 1–0 Fleetwood Town (23 February 2016)

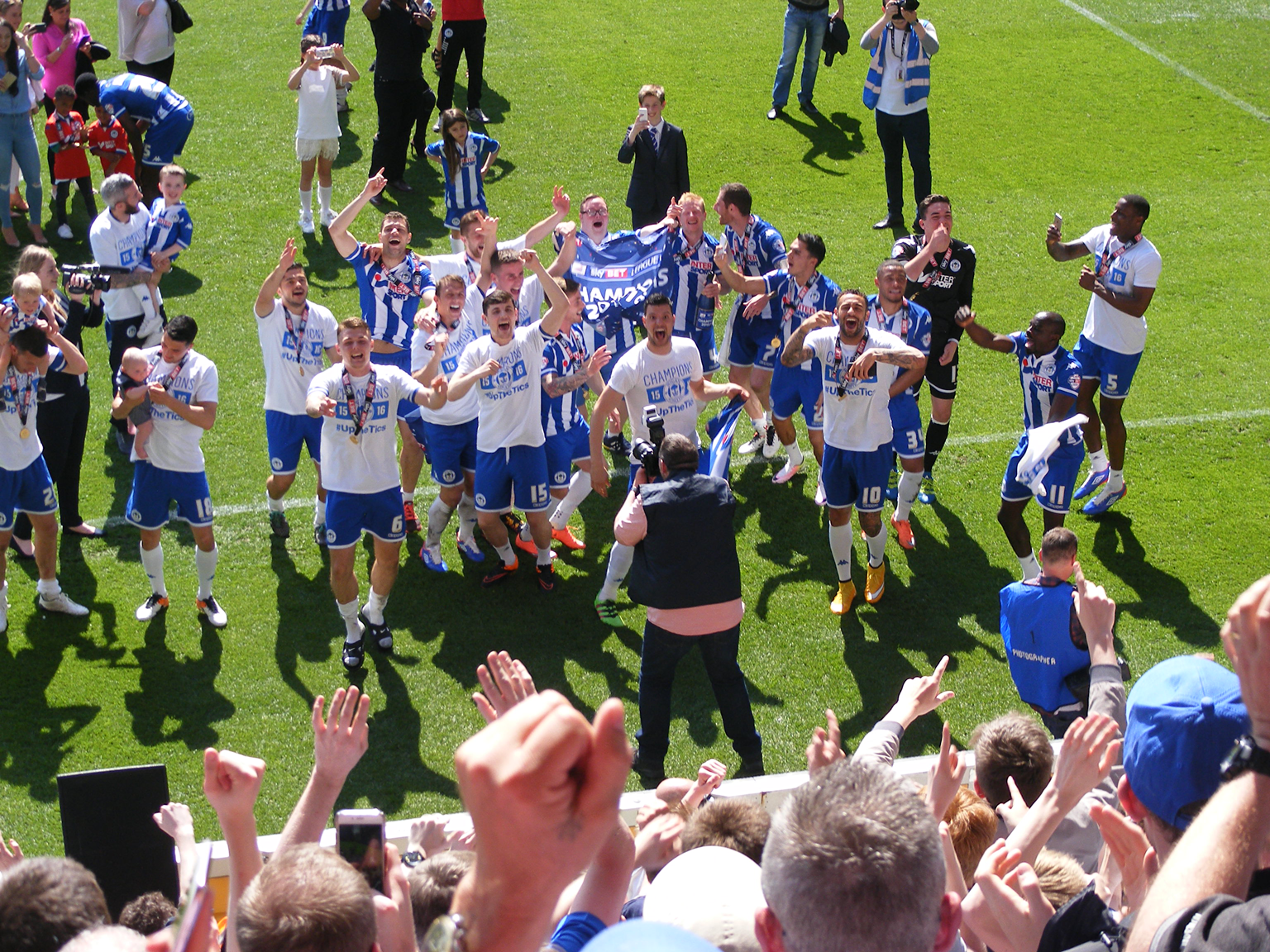

The 2015–16 Football League One (referred to as the Sky Bet League One for sponsorship reasons) was the 12th season of the Football League One under its current title and the 23rd season under its current league division format. The season began on 8 August 2015, and concluded on 8 May 2016.

== Changes from last season ==
=== Team changes ===
The following teams have changed division since the 2014–15 season.

==== To League One ====
Promoted from League Two

- Burton Albion
- Shrewsbury Town
- Bury
- Southend United

Relegated from Championship

- Millwall
- Wigan Athletic
- Blackpool

==== From League One ====
Relegated to League Two

- Notts County
- Crawley Town
- Leyton Orient
- Yeovil Town

Promoted to Championship

- Bristol City
- Milton Keynes Dons
- Preston North End

== Team overview ==
=== Stadia and locations ===
Locations of teams in the 2015–2016 Football League One
Greater Manchester League One football clubs

Team	Location	Stadium	Capacity
Barnsley	Barnsley	Oakwell	23,009
Blackpool	Blackpool	Bloomfield Road	16,750
Bradford City	Bradford	Valley Parade	25,136
Burton Albion	Burton-upon-Trent	Pirelli Stadium	6,912
Bury	Bury	Gigg Lane	11,840
Chesterfield	Chesterfield	Proact Stadium	10,400
Colchester United	Colchester	Weston Homes Community Stadium	10,105
Coventry City	Coventry	Ricoh Arena	32,500
Crewe Alexandra	Crewe	Gresty Road	10,066
Doncaster Rovers	Doncaster	Keepmoat Stadium	15,231
Fleetwood Town	Fleetwood	Highbury Stadium	5,311
Gillingham	Gillingham	Priestfield Stadium	11,582
Millwall	London (South Bermondsey)	The Den	20,146
Oldham Athletic	Oldham	Boundary Park	13,512
Peterborough United	Peterborough	Abax Stadium	14,319
Port Vale	Stoke-on-Trent	Vale Park	18,947
Rochdale	Rochdale	Spotland Stadium	10,249
Scunthorpe United	Scunthorpe	Glanford Park	9,183
Sheffield United	Sheffield	Bramall Lane	32,702
Shrewsbury Town	Shrewsbury	New Meadow	9,875
Southend United	Southend	Roots Hall	12,392
Swindon Town	Swindon	County Ground	15,728
Walsall	Walsall	Bescot Stadium	11,300
Wigan Athletic	Wigan	DW Stadium	25,138

=== Managerial changes ===
Team	Outgoing manager	Manner of departure	Date of vacancy	Position in table	Incoming manager	Date of appointment
Blackpool	Lee Clark	Resigned	9 May 2015	Pre-season	Neil McDonald	2 June 2015
Chesterfield	Paul Cook	Signed by Portsmouth	12 May 2015	Pre-season	Dean Saunders	13 May 2015
Sheffield United	Nigel Clough	Sacked	25 May 2015	Pre-season	Nigel Adkins	2 June 2015
Peterborough United	Dave Robertson	Sacked	6 September 2015	20th	Graham Westley	21 September 2015
Doncaster Rovers	Paul Dickov	Sacked	8 September 2015	17th	Rob Jones (interim)	8 September 2015
Oldham Athletic	Darren Kelly	Sacked	12 September 2015	19th	David Dunn (interim)	13 September 2015
Oldham Athletic	David Dunn (interim)	Change of contract	7 October 2015	18th	David Dunn	7 October 2015
Doncaster Rovers	Rob Jones	End of interim	16 October 2015	20th	Darren Ferguson	16 October 2015
Chesterfield	Dean Saunders	Sacked	28 November 2015	16th	Danny Wilson	24 December 2015
Walsall	Dean Smith	Signed by Brentford	30 November 2015	4th	John Ward (interim)	30 November 2015
Burton Albion	Jimmy Floyd Hasselbaink	Signed by QPR	4 December 2015	1st	Nigel Clough	5 December 2015
Walsall	John Ward (interim)	End of interim	18 December 2015	3rd	Sean O'Driscoll	18 December 2015
Oldham Athletic	David Dunn	Sacked	12 January 2016	22nd	John Sheridan	13 January 2016
Scunthorpe United	Mark Robins	Sacked	16 January 2016	13th	Graham Alexander	22 March 2016
Barnsley	Lee Johnson	Signed by Bristol City	6 February 2016	12th	Paul Heckingbottom (caretaker)	12 February 2016
Walsall	Sean O'Driscoll	Sacked	6 March 2016	4th	John Whitney (interim)	7 March 2016
Peterborough United	Graham Westley	Sacked	23 April 2016	14th	Grant McCann	23 April 2016

== League table ==
Pos	Team	Pld	W	D	L	GF	GA	GD	Pts	Promotion, qualification or relegation
1	Wigan Athletic (C, P)	46	24	15	7	82	45	+37	87	Promotion to EFL Championship
2	Burton Albion (P)	46	25	10	11	57	37	+20	85	Promotion to EFL Championship
3	Walsall	46	24	12	10	71	49	+22	84	Qualification for the League One play-offs (Note: Four teams play for one spot and promotion to Football League Championship.)
4	Millwall	46	24	9	13	73	49	+24	81	Qualification for the League One play-offs
5	Bradford City	46	23	11	12	55	40	+15	80	Qualification for the League One play-offs
6	Barnsley (O, P)	46	22	8	16	70	54	+16	74	Qualification for the League One play-offs
7	Scunthorpe United	46	21	11	14	60	47	+13	74	
8	Coventry City	46	19	12	15	67	49	+18	69	
9	Gillingham	46	19	12	15	71	56	+15	69	
10	Rochdale	46	19	12	15	68	61	+7	69	
11	Sheffield United	46	18	12	16	64	59	+5	66	
12	Port Vale	46	18	11	17	56	58	−2	65	
13	Peterborough United	46	19	6	21	82	73	+9	63	
14	Southend United	46	16	11	19	58	64	−6	59	
15	Swindon Town	46	16	11	19	64	71	−7	59	
16	Bury	46	16	12	18	56	73	−17	57 (Note: Bury were deducted 3 points for playing the unregistered Callum Styles against Southend United on 8 May.)	
17	Oldham Athletic	46	12	18	16	44	58	−14	54	
18	Chesterfield	46	15	8	23	58	70	−12	53	
19	Fleetwood Town	46	12	15	19	52	56	−4	51	
20	Shrewsbury Town	46	13	11	22	58	79	−21	50	
21	Doncaster Rovers (R)	46	11	13	22	48	64	−16	46	Relegation to EFL League Two
22	Blackpool (R)	46	12	10	24	40	63	−23	46	Relegation to EFL League Two
23	Colchester United (R)	46	9	13	24	57	99	−42	40	Relegation to EFL League Two
24	Crewe Alexandra (R)	46	7	13	26	46	83	−37	34	Relegation to EFL League Two

Updated to match(es) played on 1 July 2016. Source: BBC Sport
Rules for classification: 1) Points; 2) Goal difference; 3) Number of goals scored
(C) Champions; (O) Play-off winners; (P) Promoted; (R) Relegated

== Play-offs ==
Semi-finals
3	Walsall	0	1	1
6	Barnsley	3	3	6
4	Millwall	3	1	4
5	Bradford City	1	1	2

Final
6	Barnsley	3
4	Millwall	1

== Results ==
Home \ Away	BAR	BLP	BRA	BRT	BRY	CHF	COL	COV	CRE	DON	FLE	GIL	MIL	OLD	PET	PTV	ROC	SCU	SHU	SHR	STD	SWI	WAL	WIG
Barnsley		4–2	0–0	1–0	3–0	1–2	2–2	2–0	1–2	1–0	0–1	2–0	2–1	2–1	1–0	1–2	6–1	0–0	1–1	1–2	0–2	4–1	0–2	0–2
Blackpool	1–1		0–1	1–2	1–1	2–0	0–1	0–1	2–0	0–2	1–0	1–0	1–1	0–0	2–0	0–1	0–2	5–0	0–0	2–3	2–0	1–0	0–4	0–4
Bradford City	0–1	1–0		2–0	2–1	2–0	1–2	0–0	2–0	2–1	2–1	1–2	1–0	1–0	0–2	1–0	2–2	1–0	2–2	1–1	2–0	1–0	4–0	1–1
Burton Albion	0–0	1–0	3–1		1–1	1–0	5–1	1–2	0–0	3–3	2–1	2–1	2–1	0–0	2–1	2–0	1–0	2–1	0–0	1–2	1–0	1–0	0–0	1–1
Bury	0–0	4–3	0–0	1–0		1–0	5–2	2–1	0–0	1–0	3–4	0–1	1–3	1–1	3–1	1–0	0–0	1–2	1–0	2–2	3–2	2–2	2–3	2–2
Chesterfield	3–1	1–1	0–1	1–2	3–0		3–3	1–1	3–1	1–1	0–0	1–3	1–2	1–2	0–1	4–2	0–0	0–3	0–3	7–1	3–0	0–4	1–4	2–3
Colchester United	2–3	2–2	2–0	0–3	0–1	1–1		1–3	2–3	4–1	1–1	2–1	0–0	0–0	1–4	2–1	1–2	2–2	1–2	0–0	0–2	1–4	4–4	3–3
Coventry City	4–3	0–0	1–0	0–2	6–0	1–0	0–1		3–2	2–2	1–2	4–1	2–1	1–1	3–2	1–0	0–1	1–2	3–1	3–0	2–2	0–0	1–1	2–0
Crewe Alexandra	1–2	1–2	0–1	1–1	3–3	1–2	1–1	0–5		3–1	1–1	0–1	1–3	1–0	1–5	0–0	2–0	2–3	1–0	1–2	1–2	1–3	1–1	1–1
Doncaster Rovers	2–1	0–1	0–1	0–0	1–1	3–0	2–0	2–0	3–2		2–0	2–2	1–1	1–1	1–2	1–2	0–2	0–1	0–1	0–1	0–0	2–2	1–2	3–1
Fleetwood Town	0–2	0–0	1–1	4–0	2–0	0–1	4–0	0–1	2–0	0–0		2–1	2–1	1–1	2–0	1–2	1–1	2–1	2–2	0–0	1–1	5–1	0–1	1–3
Gillingham	2–1	2–1	3–0	0–3	3–1	1–2	1–0	0–0	3–0	1–0	5–1		1–2	3–3	2–1	0–2	2–0	2–1	4–0	2–3	1–1	0–0	1–2	2–0
Millwall	2–3	3–0	0–0	2–0	1–0	0–2	4–1	0–4	1–1	2–0	1–0	0–3		3–0	3–0	3–1	3–1	0–2	1–0	3–1	0–2	2–0	0–1	0–0
Oldham Athletic	1–2	1–0	1–2	0–1	0–1	1–0	1–1	0–2	1–0	1–2	1–0	2–1	1–2		1–5	1–1	2–3	2–4	1–1	1–1	2–5	2–0	1–0	1–1
Peterborough United	3–2	5–1	0–4	0–1	2–3	2–0	2–1	3–1	3–0	4–0	2–1	1–1	5–3	1–2		2–3	1–2	0–2	1–3	1–1	0–0	1–2	1–1	2–3
Port Vale	0–1	2–0	1–1	0–4	1–0	3–2	2–0	1–1	3–0	3–0	0–0	1–1	0–2	1–1	1–1		4–1	1–1	2–1	2–0	3–1	1–0	0–5	3–2
Rochdale	3–0	3–0	1–3	2–1	3–0	2–3	3–1	0–0	2–2	2–2	1–0	1–1	0–1	0–0	2–0	2–1		2–1	2–0	3–2	4–1	2–2	1–2	0–2
Scunthorpe United	2–0	0–1	0–2	1–0	2–1	1–1	3–0	1–0	2–0	2–0	1–0	0–0	0–0	1–1	0–4	1–0	1–1		0–1	2–1	1–0	6–0	0–1	1–1
Sheffield United	0–0	2–0	3–1	0–1	1–3	2–0	2–3	1–0	3–2	3–1	3–0	0–0	1–2	3–0	2–3	1–0	3–2	0–2		2–4	2–2	1–1	2–0	0–2
Shrewsbury Town	0–3	2–0	1–1	0–1	2–0	1–2	4–2	2–1	0–1	1–2	1–1	2–2	1–2	0–1	3–4	1–1	2–0	2–2	1–2		1–2	0–1	1–3	1–5
Southend United	2–1	1–0	0–1	3–1	4–1	0–1	3–0	3–0	1–1	0–3	2–2	1–1	0–4	0–1	2–1	1–0	2–2	2–1	3–1	0–1		0–1	0–2	0–0
Swindon Town	0–1	3–2	4–1	0–1	0–1	1–0	1–2	2–2	4–3	2–0	1–1	1–3	2–2	1–2	1–2	2–2	2–1	2–1	0–2	3–0	4–2		2–1	1–4
Walsall	1–3	1–1	2–1	2–0	0–1	1–2	2–1	2–1	1–1	2–0	3–1	3–2	0–3	1–1	2–0	2–0	0–3	0–0	1–1	2–1	1–0	1–1		1–2
Wigan Athletic	1–4	0–1	1–0	0–1	3–0	3–1	5–0	1–0	1–0	0–0	2–1	3–2	2–2	0–0	1–1	3–0	1–0	3–0	3–3	1–0	4–1	1–0	0–0	

Updated to match(es) played on 7 May 2016. Source: BBC Sport
Legend: Blue = home team win; Yellow = draw; Red = away team win.

== Top scorers ==
Rank	Player	Club	Goals
1	(Northern Ireland) Will Grigg	Wigan Athletic	25
2	(England) Nicky Ajose	Swindon Town	24
3	(England) Sam Winnall	Barnsley	23
4	(England) Billy Sharp	Sheffield United	21
5	(Republic of Ireland) Paddy Madden	Scunthorpe United	20
5	(England) Adam Armstrong	Coventry City	20
5	(England) Lee Gregory	Millwall	20
8	(Wales) Tom Bradshaw	Walsall	17
9	(Wales) Steve Morison	Millwall	16
10	(England) Leon Clarke	Bury	15

== Monthly awards ==
Month	Manager of the Month		Player of the Month		Reference
Month	Manager	Club	Player	Club	Reference
August	(England) Dean Smith	Walsall	(England) Adam Armstrong	Coventry City	
September	(Netherlands) Jimmy Floyd Hasselbaink	Burton Albion	(Jersey) Peter Vincenti	Rochdale	
October	(England) Mark Robins	Scunthorpe United	(Republic of Ireland) Aiden O'Brien	Millwall	
November	(England) Graham Westley	Peterborough United	(England) Jacob Murphy	Coventry City	
December	(England) Nigel Adkins	Sheffield United	(England) Andy Williams	Doncaster Rovers	
January	(England) Lee Johnson	Barnsley	(England) Sam Winnall	Barnsley	
February	(Scotland) Gary Caldwell	Wigan Athletic	(Scotland) Jordan Archer	Millwall	
March	(England) Paul Heckingbottom	Barnsley	(Sierra Leone) Sullay Kaikai	Shrewsbury Town	
April	(Scotland) Graham Alexander	Scunthorpe United	(Northern Ireland) Will Grigg	Wigan Athletic	

== Attendances ==
#	Club	Average attendance	Highest	Lowest
1	Sheffield United FC	19,803	24,777	17,623
2	Bradford City AFC	18,090	20,807	16,786
3	Coventry City FC	12,570	17,779	9,942
4	Barnsley FC	9,499	13,571	8,227
5	Wigan Athletic FC	9,467	18,730	7,794
6	Millwall FC	9,108	12,419	7,657
7	Swindon Town FC	7,409	9,240	6,311
8	Blackpool FC	7,052	9,226	5,960
9	Southend United FC	7,001	10,279	5,212
10	Chesterfield FC	6,676	9,402	5,227
11	Doncaster Rovers FC	6,553	10,168	4,693
12	Gillingham FC	6,316	9,375	4,823
13	Peterborough United FC	5,447	7,153	3,544
14	Shrewsbury Town FC	5,407	7,019	4,057
15	Walsall FC	5,382	7,176	3,868
16	Port Vale FC	4,993	8,595	3,256
17	Crewe Alexandra FC	4,551	6,751	3,094
18	Oldham Athletic FC	4,361	6,117	3,301
19	Colchester United FC	4,136	9,222	2,493
20	Burton Albion FC	4,089	5,512	2,666
21	Scunthorpe United FC	3,907	7,275	2,596
22	Bury FC	3,751	6,470	2,180
23	Fleetwood Town FC	3,308	5,123	2,133
24	Rochdale AFC	3,098	5,690	1,767
