= List of Huddersfield Town A.F.C. managers =

This is a list of the records of all the managers of Huddersfield Town since the club's inception in 1908.

== Statistics ==
Information correct as of matches played up to and including 2 September 2025. Only competitive matches are counted.

Name	Country	From	To	P	W	D	L	GF	GA	Win%	Notes
Fred Walker	England	August 1908	26 November 1910	92	40	12	40	183	173	43.48	
Dick Pudan	England	26 November 1910	24 April 1912	66	21	13	32	106	115	31.82	
Leslie Knighton	England	24 April 1912	27 April 1912	1	1	0	0	4	0	100.00	
Arthur Fairclough	England	27 April 1912	23 December 1919	281	125	57	99	442	349	44.48	
Ambrose Langley	England	23 December 1919	23 March 1921	65	33	13	19	101	73	50.77	
Coaching Staff		24 March 1921	30 March 1921	2	2	0	0	6	2	100.00	
Herbert Chapman	England	31 March 1921	10 June 1925	194	95	53	46	282	166	48.97	
Cecil Potter	England	3 July 1925	16 August 1926	44	24	11	9	93	64	54.55	
Jack Chaplin	Scotland	23 August 1926	27 May 1929	141	62	38	41	277	209	43.97	
Clem Stephenson	England	27 May 1929	8 June 1942	556	235	132	189	980	833	42.27	
Ted Magner	England	8 June 1942	20 September 1943	42	25	9	8	116	71	59.52	
David Steele	Scotland	20 September 1943	16 June 1947	167	73	24	70	322	299	43.71	
George Stephenson	England	21 August 1947	11 March 1952	211	62	45	104	259	380	29.38	
Board of Directors		12 March 1952	17 April 1952	7	3	2	2	10	12	42.86	
Andy Beattie	Scotland	18 April 1952	3 November 1956	196	84	45	67	314	288	42.86	
Bill Shankly	Scotland	5 November 1956	1 December 1959	137	51	36	50	211	200	37.23	
Eddie Boot	England	2 December 1959	18 January 1960	9	4	3	2	22	11	44.44	
Eddie Boot	England	19 January 1960	2 September 1964	217	79	58	80	303	304	36.41	
Ian Greaves	England	3 September 1964	25 October 1964	12	4	1	7	17	24	33.33	
Tom Johnston	Scotland	26 October 1964	13 May 1968	170	73	41	56	224	189	42.94	
Ian Greaves	England	11 June 1968	25 June 1974	281	89	88	104	306	338	31.67	
Bobby Collins	Scotland	2 July 1974	23 December 1975	76	24	18	34	82	106	31.58	
Tom Johnston	Scotland	24 December 1975	22 April 1977	74	35	18	21	98	72	47.30	
John Haselden	England	22 April 1977	29 September 1977	18	1	11	6	13	22	5.56	
Tom Johnston	Scotland	29 September 1977	29 August 1978	44	15	12	17	62	55	34.09	
Mick Buxton	England	30 August 1978	30 October 1978	12	4	3	5	15	15	33.33	
Mick Buxton	England	31 October 1978	23 December 1986	426	174	113	139	616	506	40.85	
Steve Smith	England	23 December 1986	12 January 1987	5	2	3	0	9	5	40.00	
Steve Smith	England	13 January 1987	6 October 1987	33	7	13	13	41	54	21.21	
George McAllister	England	7 October 1987	11 October 1987	1	0	0	1	1	4	0.00	
Malcolm Macdonald	England	12 October 1987	4 May 1988	37	6	7	24	33	81	16.22	
Eoin Hand	Ireland	5 May 1988	6 March 1992	216	83	57	76	284	278	38.43	
Ian Ross	Scotland	6 March 1992	14 July 1993	71	31	16	24	104	92	43.66	
Neil Warnock	England	15 July 1993	5 June 1995	120	51	37	32	177	143	42.50	
Brian Horton	England	21 June 1995	6 October 1997	120	39	35	46	142	161	32.50	
Peter Jackson	England	7 October 1997	10 May 1999	94	33	27	34	121	143	35.11	
Steve Bruce	England	24 May 1999	16 October 2000	66	25	16	25	80	76	37.88	
Lou Macari	Scotland	16 October 2000	14 June 2002	93	36	29	28	115	102	38.71	
Mick Wadsworth	England	1 July 2002	26 March 2003	43	10	10	23	32	54	23.26	
Mel Machin	England	26 March 2003	6 May 2003	7	2	2	3	10	11	28.57	
Peter Jackson	England	27 June 2003	5 March 2007	197	81	52	64	292	271	41.12	
Gerry Murphy	Ireland	6 March 2007	10 April 2007	6	1	4	1	6	6	16.67	
Andy Ritchie	England	11 April 2007	1 April 2008	51	22	5	24	62	77	43.14	
Gerry Murphy	Ireland	1 April 2008	3 May 2008	6	4	2	0	7	2	66.67	
Stan Ternent	England	3 May 2008	4 November 2008	18	5	5	8	27	31	27.78	
Gerry Murphy	Ireland	4 November 2008	15 December 2008	5	3	0	2	8	7	60.00	
Graham Mitchell	England	13 December 2008	13 December 2008	1	1	0	0	1	0	100.00	
Lee Clark	England	15 December 2008	15 February 2012	177	86	50	41	310	218	48.59	
Simon Grayson	England	20 February 2012	24 January 2013	49	17	15	17	58	69	34.69	
Mark Lillis	England	24 January 2013	14 February 2013	5	2	2	1	4	5	40.00	
Mark Robins	England	14 February 2013	10 August 2014	68	23	14	31	87	101	33.82	
Mark Lillis	England	10 August 2014	3 September 2014	6	2	1	3	11	14	33.33	
Chris Powell	England	3 September 2014	4 November 2015	58	15	21	22	69	85	25.86	
Mark Lillis	England	4 November 2015	9 November 2015	1	0	0	1	0	3	0.00	
David Wagner	United States	9 November 2015	14 January 2019	154	51	33	70	164	225	33.12	
Mark Hudson	England	14 January 2019	21 January 2019	1	0	0	1	0	3	0.00	
Jan Siewert	Germany	21 January 2019	16 August 2019	19	1	3	15	12	42	5.26	
Mark Hudson	England	17 August 2019	9 September 2019	3	0	0	3	2	6	0.00	
Danny Cowley	England	9 September 2019	19 July 2020	40	13	11	16	46	57	32.50	
Danny Schofield	England	20 July 2020	22 July 2020	1	0	0	1	1	4	0.00	
Carlos Corberán	Spain	23 July 2020	7 July 2022	102	38	28	36	123	129	37.25	
Danny Schofield	England	7 July 2022	14 September 2022	9	1	1	7	9	17	11.11	
Paul Harsley; Narcís Pèlach	England; Spain	14 September 2022	28 September 2022	1	1	0	0	1	0	100.00	
Mark Fotheringham	Scotland	28 September 2022	8 February 2023	21	5	6	10	20	28	23.81	
Narcís Pèlach	Spain	8 February 2023	15 February 2023	2	0	0	2	0	4	0.00	
Neil Warnock	England	16 February 2023	20 September 2023	23	9	6	8	29	31	39.13	
Darren Moore	Jamaica	21 September 2023	29 January 2024	23	3	11	9	21	40	13.04	
Jon Worthington	England	29 January 2024	19 February 2024	4	2	0	2	9	7	50.00	
André Breitenreiter	Germany	20 February 2024	10 May 2024	13	2	5	6	10	23	15.38	
Michael Duff	Northern Ireland	13 May 2024	9 March 2025	43	20	7	16	60	43	46.51	
Jon Worthington	England	9 March 2024	27 May 2025	10	2	0	8	11	22	20.00	
Lee Grant	England	28 May 2025	17 January 2026	36	15	8	13	73	56	41.67	
Liam Manning	England	20 January 2026		9	4	2	3	10	9	44.44	
Jon Stead; Martin Drury	England	25 March 2026		0	0	0	0	0	0	—	

== Managers with honours ==
Name	Tenure	Honours
Fred Walker	1908–1910	Election into the English Football League
Ambrose Langley	1919–1921	1920 FA Cup Final; 1920 Second Division Runners-up
Herbert Chapman	1921–1925	1922 FA Cup; 1922 FA Charity Shield; 1924 First Division; 1925 First Division
Cecil Potter	1925–1926	1926 First Division
Jack Chaplin	1926–1929	1927 First Division Runners-up; 1928 FA Cup Final; 1928 First Division Runners-up; 1929 FA Cup Semi Final
Clem Stephenson	1929–1942	1930 FA Cup Final; 1934 First Division Runners-up; 1938 FA Cup Final; 1939 FA Cup Semi Final
Andy Beattie	1952–1956	1953 Second Division Runners-up
Tom Johnston	1964–1968	1968 Football League Cup Semi Final
Ian Greaves	1968–1974	1970 Second Division
Mick Buxton	1978–1986	1980 Fourth Division; 1983 Promoted Automatically from Third Division
Neil Warnock	1993–1995, 2023	1994 Football League Trophy Final; 1995 Football League Second Division play-off final
Peter Jackson	2003–2007	2004 Football League Third Division play-off final
Simon Grayson	2012–2013	2012 Football League One play-off final
David Wagner	2015–2019	2017 EFL Championship play-off final
