= 2021–22 EFL League One =

EFL League One
- Season: 2021–22
- Dates: 7 August 2021 – 30 April 2022
- Champions: Wigan Athletic
- Promoted: Wigan Athletic; Rotherham United; Sunderland
- Relegated: Gillingham; Doncaster Rovers; AFC Wimbledon; Crewe Alexandra
- Matches: 552
- Goals: 1,489 (2.7 per match)
- Top goalscorer: Will Keane (26 goals)
- Biggest home win: Ipswich Town 6–0 Doncaster Rovers (28 September 2021); Bolton Wanderers 6–0 Sunderland (29 January 2022); Sheffield Wednesday 6–0 Cambridge United (12 March 2022)
- Biggest away win: Cheltenham Town 0–5 Cambridge United (7 December 2021); Gillingham 2–7 Oxford United (29 January 2022); Doncaster Rovers 0–5 Rotherham United (1 February 2022); Plymouth Argyle 0–5 Milton Keynes Dons (30 April 2022)
- Highest scoring: Wycombe Wanderers 5–5 Cheltenham Town (19 February 2022)
- Longest winning run: Rotherham United (6 games)
- Longest unbeaten run: Plymouth Argyle; Rotherham United (16 games)
- Longest winless run: AFC Wimbledon (27 games)
- Longest losing run: Crewe Alexandra (8 games)
- Highest attendance: 38,395; Sunderland 1–2 Doncaster Rovers (5 February 2022)
- Lowest attendance: 1,746; Accrington Stanley 0–2 AFC Wimbledon (7 December 2021)
- Total attendance: 4,772,270
- Average attendance: 9,942

The 2021–22 EFL League One (referred to as the Sky Bet League One for sponsorship reasons) was the 18th season of the Football League One under its current title and the 30th season under its current league division format.

== Team changes ==
The following teams have changed division since the 2020–21 season:

=== To League One ===
Promoted from League Two

- Cheltenham Town
- Cambridge United
- Bolton Wanderers
- Morecambe

Relegated from the Championship

- Wycombe Wanderers
- Rotherham United
- Sheffield Wednesday

=== From League One ===
Promoted to the Championship

- Hull City
- Peterborough United
- Blackpool

Relegated to League Two

- Rochdale
- Northampton Town
- Swindon Town
- Bristol Rovers

== Stadiums ==
Locations of the 2021–22 EFL League One teams

Team	Location	Stadium	Capacity
Accrington Stanley	Accrington	Crown Ground	5,057
AFC Wimbledon	London (Wimbledon)	Plough Lane	9,300
Bolton Wanderers	Horwich	University of Bolton Stadium	28,723
Burton Albion	Burton	Pirelli Stadium	6,912
Cambridge United	Cambridge	Abbey Stadium	8,127
Charlton Athletic	London (Charlton)	The Valley	27,111
Cheltenham Town	Cheltenham	Whaddon Road	7,066
Crewe Alexandra	Crewe	Gresty Road	10,180
Doncaster Rovers	Doncaster	Keepmoat Stadium	15,231
Fleetwood Town	Fleetwood	Highbury Stadium	5,327
Gillingham	Gillingham	Priestfield Stadium	11,582
Ipswich Town	Ipswich	Portman Road	30,311
Lincoln City	Lincoln	Sincil Bank	10,120
Milton Keynes Dons	Milton Keynes	Stadium MK	30,500
Morecambe	Morecambe	Globe Arena	6,476
Oxford United	Oxford	Kassam Stadium	12,500
Plymouth Argyle	Plymouth	Home Park	17,300
Portsmouth	Portsmouth	Fratton Park	19,669
Rotherham United	Rotherham	New York Stadium	12,021
Sheffield Wednesday	Sheffield	Hillsborough Stadium	39,732
Shrewsbury Town	Shrewsbury	New Meadow	9,875
Sunderland	Sunderland	Stadium of Light	49,000
Wigan Athletic	Wigan	DW Stadium	25,133
Wycombe Wanderers	High Wycombe	Adams Park	9,448

== Personnel and sponsoring ==
Team	Manager	Captain	Kit manufacturer	Sponsor
Accrington Stanley	(England) John Coleman	(Republic of Ireland) Séamus Conneely	(Germany) Adidas	Wham
AFC Wimbledon	(Wales) Mark Bowen	(England) Alex Woodyard	(Germany) Puma	Sports Interactive
Bolton Wanderers	(England) Ian Evatt	(Portugal) Ricardo Santos	(Italy) Macron	Home Bargains
Burton Albion	(Netherlands) Jimmy Floyd Hasselbaink	(England) John Brayford	(England) TAG	Prestec UK Ltd
Cambridge United	(England) Mark Bonner	(England) Greg Taylor	(Denmark) Hummel	Mick George
Charlton Athletic	(England) Johnnie Jackson	(England) Jason Pearce	(Denmark) Hummel	KW Holdings (Home & Third); Walker Mower (Away)
Cheltenham Town	(Northern Ireland) Michael Duff	(England) Will Boyle	(Italy) Erreà	Mira Showers
Crewe Alexandra	(England) Alex Morris	(England) Luke Murphy	(Thailand) FBT	Mornflake
Doncaster Rovers	(England) Gary McSheffrey	(England) Tom Anderson	(England) Elite Pro Sports	LNER
Fleetwood Town	(Scotland) Stephen Crainey	(England) Jordan Rossiter	(Denmark) Hummel	BES Utilities
Gillingham	(England) Neil Harris	(England) Stuart O'Keefe	(Italy) Macron	MEMS Power Generation
Ipswich Town	(Northern Ireland) Kieran McKenna	(Egypt) Sam Morsy	(Germany) Adidas	Ed Sheeran
Lincoln City	(England) Michael Appleton	(Scotland) Liam Bridcutt	(Italy) Erreà	Virgin Wines (Home); Light Source (Home); Buildbase (Home); University of Lincoln (Home); Branston Ltd (Home); SRP Hire (Away)
Milton Keynes Dons	(England) Liam Manning	(England) Dean Lewington	(Italy) Erreà	Suzuki
Morecambe	(Scotland) Derek Adams	(Republic of Ireland) Anthony O'Connor	(Spain) Joma	Mazuma
Oxford United	(England) Karl Robinson	(England) John Mousinho	(Germany) Puma	EB Charging
Plymouth Argyle	(England) Steven Schumacher	(England) Joe Edwards	(Germany) Puma	Ginsters
Portsmouth	(England) Danny Cowley	(Scotland) Clark Robertson	(United States) Nike	University of Portsmouth
Rotherham United	(England) Paul Warne	(England) Richard Wood	(Germany) Puma	IPM Group (home); Intelipod (away and third)
Sheffield Wednesday	(Jamaica) Darren Moore	(Scotland) Barry Bannan	(Italy) Macron	Chansiri (home); Elev8 (away and third)
Shrewsbury Town	(England) Steve Cotterill	(England) Ethan Ebanks-Landell	(England) Umbro	Tuffins Supermarkets (Home); Shropshire Homes (Away)
Sunderland	(Scotland) Alex Neil	(Northern Ireland) Corry Evans	(United States) Nike	Great Annual Savings Group
Wigan Athletic	(England) Leam Richardson	(Zimbabwe) Tendayi Darikwa	(Germany) Puma	EPIC.gi
Wycombe Wanderers	(England) Gareth Ainsworth	(Wales) Joe Jacobson	(Republic of Ireland) O'Neills	Dreams (home and away); Cherry Red Records (third)

== Managerial changes ==
Team	Outgoing manager	Manner of departure	Date of vacancy	Position in table	Incoming manager	Date of appointment
Doncaster Rovers	(England) Andy Butler	End of interim spell	17 May 2021	Pre-season	(England) Richie Wellens	17 May 2021
Morecambe	(Scotland) Derek Adams	Resigned	3 June 2021	Pre-season	(Northern Ireland) Stephen Robinson	7 June 2021
Milton Keynes Dons	(Scotland) Russell Martin	Signed by Swansea City	1 August 2021	Pre-season	(England) Liam Manning	13 August 2021
Charlton Athletic	(England) Nigel Adkins	Sacked	21 October 2021	22nd	(England) Johnnie Jackson	17 December 2021
Fleetwood Town	(England) Simon Grayson	Sacked	24 November 2021	22nd	(Scotland) Stephen Crainey	21 December 2021
Doncaster Rovers	(England) Richie Wellens	Sacked	2 December 2021	23rd	(England) Gary McSheffrey	29 December 2021
Ipswich Town	(England) Paul Cook	Sacked	4 December 2021	11th	(Northern Ireland) Kieran McKenna	16 December 2021
Plymouth Argyle	(England) Ryan Lowe	Signed by Preston North End	7 December 2021	4th	(England) Steven Schumacher	7 December 2021
Gillingham	(Scotland) Steve Evans	Mutual consent	9 January 2022	22nd	(England) Neil Harris	31 January 2022
Sunderland	(England) Lee Johnson	Sacked	30 January 2022	3rd	(Scotland) Alex Neil	11 February 2022
Morecambe	(Northern Ireland) Stephen Robinson	Signed by St Mirren	22 February 2022	21st	(Scotland) Derek Adams	24 February 2022
AFC Wimbledon	(England) Mark Robinson	Mutual consent	28 March 2022	21st	(Wales) Mark Bowen	30 March 2022
Crewe Alexandra	(Gibraltar) David Artell	Sacked	11 April 2022	24th	(England) Alex Morris	11 April 2022

== League table ==
Pos	Team	Pld	W	D	L	GF	GA	GD	Pts	Promotion, qualification or relegation
1	Wigan Athletic (C, P)	46	27	11	8	82	44	+38	92	Promotion to EFL Championship
2	Rotherham United (P)	46	27	9	10	70	33	+37	90	Promotion to EFL Championship
3	Milton Keynes Dons	46	26	11	9	78	44	+34	89	Qualification for League One play-offs
4	Sheffield Wednesday	46	24	13	9	78	50	+28	85	Qualification for League One play-offs
5	Sunderland (O, P)	46	24	12	10	79	53	+26	84	Qualification for League One play-offs
6	Wycombe Wanderers	46	23	14	9	75	51	+24	83	Qualification for League One play-offs
7	Plymouth Argyle	46	23	11	12	68	48	+20	80	
8	Oxford United	46	22	10	14	82	59	+23	76	
9	Bolton Wanderers	46	21	10	15	74	57	+17	73	
10	Portsmouth	46	20	13	13	68	51	+17	73	
11	Ipswich Town	46	18	16	12	67	46	+21	70	
12	Accrington Stanley	46	17	10	19	61	80	−19	61	
13	Charlton Athletic	46	17	8	21	55	59	−4	59	
14	Cambridge United	46	15	13	18	56	74	−18	58	
15	Cheltenham Town	46	13	17	16	66	80	−14	56	
16	Burton Albion	46	14	11	21	51	67	−16	53	
17	Lincoln City	46	14	10	22	55	63	−8	52	
18	Shrewsbury Town	46	12	14	20	47	51	−4	50	
19	Morecambe	46	10	12	24	57	88	−31	42	
20	Fleetwood Town	46	8	16	22	62	82	−20	40	
21	Gillingham (R)	46	8	16	22	35	69	−34	40	Relegation to EFL League Two
22	Doncaster Rovers (R)	46	10	8	28	37	82	−45	38	Relegation to EFL League Two
23	AFC Wimbledon (R)	46	6	19	21	49	75	−26	37	Relegation to EFL League Two
24	Crewe Alexandra (R)	46	7	8	31	37	83	−46	29	Relegation to EFL League Two

Source: EFL Official Website
Rules for classification: 1) Points; 2) Goal difference; 3) Number of goals scored; 4) Head-to-head results; 5) Wins; 6) Away goals; 7) Penalty points based on yellow and red cards received excluding the last four games of the season (sec 9.5); 8) 12-point sending off offences; 9) If the tie affects the automatic promotion or relegation places, a play-off game or games would be held between the two tied teams
(C) Champions; (O) Play-off winners; (P) Promoted; (R) Relegated

== Play-offs ==
Semi-finals
3	Milton Keynes Dons	0	1	1
6	Wycombe Wanderers	2	0	2
4	Sheffield Wednesday	0	1	1
5	Sunderland	1	1	2

Final
6	Wycombe Wanderers	0
5	Sunderland	2

First leg

5 May 2022
19:45

Wycombe Wanderers	2–0	Milton Keynes Dons
Gape (yellow card) 31': Tafazolli 38' (Jacobson); Jacobson (yellow card) 60' Horgan (yellow card) 64'; Vokes 82' (McCleary)	Report	McEachran (yellow card) 63' (yellow-red card) 69'

Adams Park, High Wycombe
Attendance: 8,987
Referee: Darren Bond
6 May 2022
19:45

Sunderland	1–0	Sheffield Wednesday
Stewart 45+1'; O'Nien (yellow card) 63'	Report	Luongo (yellow card) 52'

Stadium of Light, Sunderland
Attendance: 44,742
Referee: Matt Donohue

Second leg

8 May 2022
18:30

Milton Keynes Dons	1–0	Wycombe Wanderers
Parrott 26' (Boateng)	Report	Scowen (yellow card) 30'; McCarthy (yellow card) 83'; Jacobson (yellow card) 83'

Stadium MK, Milton Keynes
Attendance: 13,012
Referee: Thomas Bramall

Wycombe Wanderers won 2–1 on aggregate.

9 May 2022
19:45

Sheffield Wednesday	1–1	Sunderland
Byers (yellow card) 24'; Bannan (yellow card) 27'; Gregory; Dean (yellow card) 77'	Report	Stewart (yellow card) 45+1'; Roberts; Matete (yellow card) 90+11'

Hillsborough Stadium, Owlerton
Attendance: 32,978
Referee: James Linington

Sunderland won 2–1 on aggregate.

=== Final ===
21 May 2022
15:00 BST

Wycombe Wanderers	0–2	Sunderland
	Report	Embleton 12'; Stewart 79'

Wembley Stadium, London
Attendance: 72,332
Referee: Simon Hooper

== Results ==
Home \ Away	ACC	WIM	BOL	BRT	CAM	CHA	CHE	CRE	DON	FLE	GIL	IPS	LIN	MKD	MOR	OXF	PLY	POR	ROT	SHW	SHR	SUN	WIG	WYC
Accrington Stanley	—	0–2	1–0	0–0	2–1	2–1	4–4	4–1	1–0	5–1	1–2	2–1	2–1	1–1	2–2	2–0	1–4	2–2	1–0	2–3	1–0	1–1	1–4	3–2
AFC Wimbledon	3–4	—	3–3	1–1	0–1	1–1	2–2	3–2	2–2	2–2	1–1	0–2	0–2	1–1	0–0	3–1	0–1	0–0	0–1	2–2	1–1	1–1	0–2	1–1
Bolton Wanderers	3–1	4–0	—	0–0	2–0	2–1	2–2	2–0	3–0	4–2	2–2	2–0	3–1	3–3	1–1	2–1	0–1	1–1	0–2	1–1	2–1	6–0	0–4	0–2
Burton Albion	4–0	1–1	3–1	—	2–2	0–1	1–1	4–1	2–0	3–2	1–1	2–1	1–2	0–1	3–2	1–3	0–0	2–1	2–0	0–2	0–2	1–0	0–0	1–2
Cambridge United	2–0	1–0	1–0	3–0	—	0–2	2–2	1–0	3–1	2–2	0–2	2–2	1–5	0–1	2–1	1–1	2–0	0–0	0–1	1–1	0–0	1–2	2–2	1–4
Charlton Athletic	2–3	3–2	1–4	2–0	2–0	—	1–2	2–0	4–0	2–0	1–0	2–0	1–2	0–2	2–3	0–4	2–0	2–2	1–1	0–0	2–0	0–0	0–2	0–1
Cheltenham Town	1–0	3–1	1–2	1–1	0–5	1–1	—	1–2	4–0	2–0	2–2	2–1	2–2	1–1	3–1	1–0	0–2	1–0	0–2	2–2	2–1	2–1	0–0	1–3
Crewe Alexandra	0–1	3–1	0–1	2–0	2–2	2–1	1–1	—	1–1	1–3	2–0	1–1	2–0	1–4	1–3	0–1	1–4	1–3	0–2	0–2	0–0	0–4	0–2	1–3
Doncaster Rovers	2–0	1–2	1–2	2–0	1–1	0–1	3–2	2–0	—	0–1	0–1	0–1	0–0	2–1	1–0	1–2	1–3	0–0	0–5	1–3	1–0	0–3	1–2	0–2
Fleetwood Town	1–2	1–1	3–0	0–1	1–1	1–2	3–2	3–0	0–0	—	2–1	0–2	1–1	1–1	1–2	2–3	3–3	0–1	1–0	2–3	0–3	2–2	2–3	3–3
Gillingham	0–0	0–0	0–3	1–3	1–0	1–1	0–2	1–0	1–0	0–0	—	0–4	1–1	1–4	2–1	2–7	0–2	0–1	0–2	0–0	0–0	1–2	0–2	1–1
Ipswich Town	2–1	2–2	2–5	3–0	0–1	4–0	0–0	2–1	6–0	2–1	1–0	—	2–0	2–2	2–2	0–0	1–0	0–0	0–2	1–1	2–1	1–1	2–2	1–0
Lincoln City	0–1	0–1	0–1	1–2	0–1	2–1	3–0	2–1	0–1	2–1	0–2	0–1	—	2–3	2–1	2–0	2–2	0–3	1–1	3–1	1–1	0–0	1–3	1–1
Milton Keynes Dons	2–0	1–0	2–0	1–0	4–1	2–1	3–1	2–1	0–1	3–3	0–0	0–0	2–1	—	2–0	1–2	1–1	1–0	0–3	2–3	2–0	1–2	1–1	1–0
Morecambe	3–3	3–4	1–1	3–0	0–2	2–2	1–3	1–2	4–3	0–0	1–1	1–1	2–0	0–4	—	2–1	1–1	1–1	0–1	1–0	2–0	0–1	1–2	3–2
Oxford United	5–1	3–0	2–3	4–1	4–2	2–1	1–1	1–0	1–1	3–1	1–1	1–1	3–1	1–0	3–1	—	1–3	3–2	0–0	3–2	2–0	1–2	2–3	0–0
Plymouth Argyle	4–0	2–0	3–0	2–1	1–1	1–0	2–0	1–1	2–1	1–1	1–0	2–1	1–2	0–5	2–0	1–0	—	1–0	0–1	3–0	1–0	0–0	1–2	0–3
Portsmouth	4–0	2–1	1–0	2–1	1–2	1–2	1–1	2–0	4–0	3–3	3–1	0–4	3–2	1–2	2–0	3–2	2–2	—	3–0	0–0	1–0	4–0	3–2	0–0
Rotherham United	1–0	3–0	2–1	3–1	3–1	0–1	1–0	1–1	2–0	2–4	5–1	1–0	2–1	1–2	2–0	2–1	2–0	4–1	—	0–2	0–3	5–1	1–1	0–0
Sheffield Wednesday	1–1	2–1	1–0	5–2	6–0	2–0	4–1	1–0	2–0	1–0	1–1	1–0	1–1	2–1	2–0	1–2	4–2	4–1	0–2	—	1–1	3–0	1–0	2–2
Shrewsbury Town	0–0	2–1	0–1	0–1	4–1	1–0	3–1	1–1	3–3	1–1	2–1	1–1	1–0	1–0	5–0	1–2	0–3	1–2	0–0	1–0	—	1–1	0–3	1–2
Sunderland	2–1	1–0	1–0	1–1	5–1	0–1	5–0	2–0	1–2	3–1	1–0	2–0	1–3	1–2	5–0	1–1	2–1	1–0	1–1	5–0	3–2	—	2–1	3–1
Wigan Athletic	3–0	1–0	1–1	2–0	1–2	2–1	2–0	2–0	2–1	2–0	3–2	1–1	1–2	1–2	4–1	1–1	1–1	1–0	1–0	1–2	2–1	0–3	—	1–1
Wycombe Wanderers	2–1	2–2	1–0	2–1	3–0	2–1	5–5	2–1	2–0	1–0	2–0	1–4	1–0	0–1	4–3	2–0	2–0	0–1	0–0	1–0	0–0	3–3	1–3	—

Updated to match(es) played on 30 April 2022. Source:
Legend: Blue = home team win; Yellow = draw; Red = away team win.
For upcoming matches, an "a" indicates there is an article about the rivalry between the two participants.

== Season statistics ==
As of 30 April 2022

=== Top scorers ===
Rank	Player	Club	Goals
1	(Republic of Ireland) Will Keane	Wigan Athletic	26
2	(Scotland) Ross Stewart	Sunderland	24
3	(England) Alfie May	Cheltenham Town	23
3	(England) Cole Stockton	Morecambe	23
5	(England) Matty Taylor	Oxford United	20
5	(England) Scott Twine	Milton Keynes Dons	20
7	(England) Michael Smith	Rotherham United	19
8	(Wales) Sam Vokes	Wycombe Wanderers	16
8	(England) Lee Gregory	Sheffield Wednesday	16
8	(Scotland) Ryan Hardie	Plymouth Argyle	16

- Updated to match(es) played on 30 April 2022

== Monthly awards ==
Month	Manager of the Month		Player of the Month		Reference
August	(England) Lee Johnson	Sunderland	(England) Cole Stockton	Morecambe	
September	(England) Liam Manning	Milton Keynes Dons	(England) Cole Stockton	Morecambe	
October	(England) Ryan Lowe	Plymouth Argyle	(England) Michael Smith	Rotherham United	
November	(England) Danny Cowley	Portsmouth	(England) Scott Twine	Milton Keynes Dons	
December	(England) Lee Johnson	Sunderland	(England) Daniel Barlaser	Rotherham United	
January	(England) Liam Manning	Milton Keynes Dons	(England) Michael Smith	Rotherham United	
February	(England) Paul Warne	Rotherham United	(England) Alfie May	Cheltenham Town	
March	(England) Steven Schumacher	Plymouth Argyle	(Scotland) Barry Bannan	Sheffield Wednesday	
