= Dennis and Dee Don't Get Rich =

- It's Always Sunny in Philadelphia episode
- Episode no.: Season 18; Episode 2
- Directed by: Todd Biermann
- Written by: Charlie Day; Glenn Howerton
- Cinematography by: John Tanzer
- Editing by: Steve Welch
- Production code: XIP18002
- Original air date: August 17, 2026
- Running time: 22 minutes

Guest appearances
- Sandy Martin as Mrs. Mac; Andrew Friedman as Uncle Jack; Nate Corddry as Mortician; Gregory Scott Cummins as Donald/Luther; Carol Kane as Sam

Episode chronology
← Previous "Frank Marries a Corpse"	Next → "The Gang Gets Tested"
- It's Always Sunny in Philadelphia season 18

"Dennis and Dee Don't Get Rich" is the second episode of the eighteenth season of the American sitcom television series It's Always Sunny in Philadelphia. It is the 180th overall episode of the series and was written by executive producer Charlie Day and series co-creator Glenn Howerton, and directed by co-executive producer Todd Biermann. It originally aired on FX and FXX on August 17, 2026.

The series follows "The Gang", a group of five misfit friends: twins Dennis and Deandra "(Sweet) Dee" Reynolds, their friends Charlie Kelly and Ronald "Mac" McDonald, and Frank Reynolds, Dennis's and Dee's legal father. The Gang runs the fictional Paddy's Pub, an unsuccessful Irish bar in South Philadelphia. In the episode, Charlie and Frank prepare the funerals for Bonnie and Sam, while Dennis and Dee try to secure their inheritance.

The episode received positive reviews from critics, who praised the series' tribute to Lynne Marie Stewart.

== Plot ==
At the morgue, Dennis and Dee get Sam's death certificate and deliver it to Jack Kelly to help them get access to Sam's inheritance. However, the transfer cannot proceed as the marriage certificate was not issued with Sam's signature and thumbprint. They return to the morgue to retrieve the thumbprint; as they did not bring an ink pad, they are forced to cut Sam's thumb.

With Charlie arranging his mother's funeral, he plans to sell her house. Mac gets worried about his mother, who lived with her, as Dennis does not want her to live with them. He takes his mother to visit his father Luther in prison, asking for help. After realizing Bonnie died, he asks Mac to take his mom with his twin brother Donald. As they visit Donald, they are shocked to see Luther accompanied by an officer, as he has a 24-hour compassionate leave to attend Bonnie's funeral. He makes amends with Donald for not including him in his criminal organization, but confides in Mac that he plans to set Donald to pretend to be him during the funeral and make it seem like he escaped, while he flees from authorities.

When Dennis and Dee deliver the thumbprint to Jack, he states that they took the wrong thumb. They are forced to return to the morgue, only to discover that Frank already claimed her body. Frank and Charlie then take part in the Mummers Parade, which culminates with Frank sending Bonnie's ashes and Sam's corpse flying through a cannon into a river, ruining Dennis and Dee's plan. The police arrest Donald, but Mac informs the police that he is not Luther. However, he realizes that Luther switched places with Donald, and that Donald is going to jail instead, as he knew Mac would rat him out. Luther disappears into the crowd, promising to kill Mac someday.

== Production ==
=== Development ===
In July 2026, FX reported that the second episode of the eighteenth season would be titled "Dennis and Dee Don't Get Rich", and was to be written by executive producer Charlie Day and series co-creator Glenn Howerton, and directed by co-executive producer Todd Biermann. This marked Day's 73rd writing credit, Howerton's 47th writing credit, and Biermann's 20th directing credit.

== Reception ==
=== Critical reviews ===
"Dennis and Dee Don't Get Rich" earned positive reviews from critics. Meredith Loftus of Collider wrote, "Where last season hit new highs, Season 18 is overall another hilarious installment of TV that reminds you why you've loved the show this long. Nods to previous episodes and the return of familiar faces only reinforce that there's something in the water (or in Paddy's Pub's case, beer) that keeps bringing us back."

Grant Hermanns of Screen Rant wrote, "However, in also looking to expand on the introduction of Sam from the season 17 finale, and still incorporate Mac, Dennis, and Dee's separate schemes into the mix, it feels as though it detracts from Day's ultimate goal for Stewart's tribute, and makes every subplot feel rushed." Andrew Sanford of Pajiba wrote, "Eventually, they throw a big parade-style funeral and fire Kane's character's corpse out of a cannon while a giant cutout of Marie Stewart's face looks on, smiling, and Mac accidentally gets his uncle sent to prison in place of his dad. It was insane, and it felt like a proper sendoff worthy of Lynne Marie Stewart's talents."

Jerrica Tisdale of Telltale TV gave the episode a 4 star rating out of 5 and wrote, "“Dennis and Dee Do Not Get Rich” is a fun episode that gives us some golden insane Dee and Dennis moments. However, the heart lies in how it tries to give a deserved send-off to one of the show's most beloved actresses and characters. We will miss Bonnie Kelly." Sam Huang of TV Fanatic gave the episode a 2-episode premiere a 4 star rating out of 5 and wrote, "After a solid premiere, it's safe to say that I'm finally feeling hopeful for what It's Always Sunny in Philadelphia Season 18 has in store for the Gang."
