= Martin Drury =

English footballer and coach

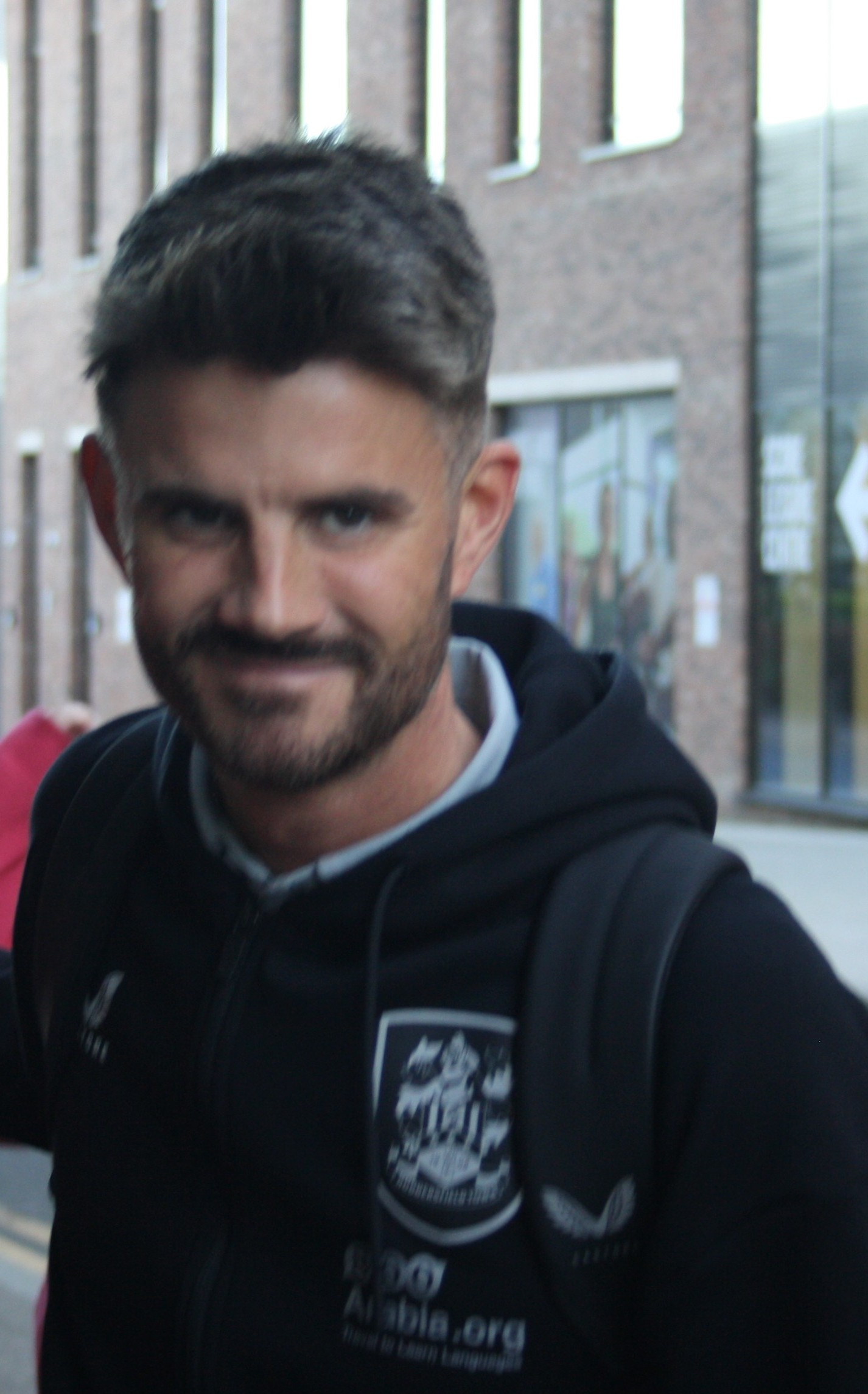
- Drury with Huddersfield Town in 2026

Personal information
- Full name: Martin Drury
- Date of birth: 10 April 1986 (age 40)
- Place of birth: Huddersfield, England
- Position: Left-back

Team information
- Current team: Huddersfield Town (manager)

Youth career
- Doncaster Rovers

Senior career*
Years	Team	Apps	(Gls)
2002–2004	Doncaster Rovers	0	(0)
2004	→ Gainsborough Trinity (loan)		
2004–2006	Sheffield Wednesday	0	(0)
2006–2009	Gainsborough Trinity		
2007	→ Belper Town (loan)		
2009–2014	Bradford (Park Avenue)		

Managerial career
- 2015–2016: Bradford (Park Avenue)
- 2019: Bradford City (caretaker)
- 2026: Huddersfield Town (acting)
- 2026–: Huddersfield Town
- * Club domestic league appearances and goals

Martin Drury (born 10 April 1986) is an English football coach and former player who is the manager of EFL League One club Huddersfield Town.

== Playing career ==
Born in Huddersfield, Drury played as a left-back for Doncaster Rovers, Gainsborough Trinity, Sheffield Wednesday, Belper Town, and Bradford (Park Avenue). He retired at the age of 28 due to injury.

== Coaching career ==
=== Early career ===
After retiring as a player, Drury worked for Bradford (Park Avenue) (as both assistant manager and then manager), and also as a coach at Boston United.

At Park Avenue, he was appointed manager in April 2015, replacing John Deacey. He left the club in March 2016, and was replaced by Darren Edmondson.

=== Bradford City ===
Drury joined Bradford City in 2016, initially working in their Academy. In July 2017 he became a full-time youth coach at the club, and in May 2018 he became Lead Development Coach for the club's entire youth set-up.

He later worked as first-team coach under both Michael Collins and David Hopkin. In February 2019, after the resignation of Hopkin, Drury was appointed as the club's caretaker manager. A few days later he appointed Paul Caddis as club captain, replacing Anthony O'Connor. Drury's first game in charge, on 2 March 2019, was a 5–1 away defeat against Portsmouth. After the game, Drury said that appointing a new permanent manager was a "matter of urgency". Two days later, on 4 March 2019, Gary Bowyer was appointed as Bradford City manager until the end of the 2018–19 season. Drury was retained by the club as a coach. By August 2021 his role was 'Senior Technical and Tactical Coach'. He became Head of Academy Coaching in March 2022, and later that month spoke positively about the achievements of the youth team.

=== Manchester United, West Bromwich Albion, Valencia, and Brentford ===
In July 2022 he became an academy coach at Manchester United. He moved to a coaching role at West Bromwich Albion in August 2024, before becoming an assistant coach at Spanish club Valencia in January 2025.

He returned to England in July 2025 to become an assistant first team coach at Brentford, but left the club in early September.

=== Huddersfield Town ===
In January 2026 he became assistant manager at Huddersfield Town. In March 2026 he was appointed the acting manager of Huddersfield Town until the end of the season, following Liam Manning going on compassionate leave. The position was made permanent in May 2026.

Having picked up seven points from the first three matches of the 2026–27 season, Drury was named EFL League One Manager of the Month for August 2026. He received the award for a second time for October 2026 after five wins and one draw in six matches.

== Personal life ==
As of November 2012, Drury was married with two sons.

== Managerial statistics ==
As of match played 21 November 2026

Managerial record by team and tenure
Team	From	To	Record					Ref
Team	From	To	P	W	D	L	Win %	Ref
Bradford (Park Avenue)	5 May 2015	20 March 2016	37	11	12	14	29.7	
Bradford City (caretaker)	25 February 2019	4 March 2019	1	0	0	1	0.0	
Huddersfield Town (caretaker)	25 March 2026	27 May 2026	7	2	4	1	28.6	
Huddersfield Town	27 May 2026	Present	20	11	6	3	55.0	
Total			65	24	22	19	36.9	

== Honours ==
=== As a manager ===
Individual

- EFL League One Manager of the Month: August 2026, October 2026
