= EFL League One Manager of the Month =

English football award

The Manager of the Month is an association football award that recognises the manager adjudged best for each month of the season in the Football League One, the third tier of English football. The recipient is chosen by a panel assembled by the League's sponsor and announced alongside The Championship and League Two Manager of the Month awards at the beginning of the following month. For sponsorship reasons, from its inception in 2004 until 2010 it was known as the Coca-Cola Manager of the Month award, with the Coca-Cola company sponsoring the league during that period. From the 2010–11 season until the end of the 2012–13 season the league was sponsored by npower and the award was known as the npower Manager of the Month. In July 2013, it was announced that Sky Bet would become the new sponsor of the English Football League, and since August 2013 the award has been known as the Sky Bet Manager of the Month. In November 2017 it was announced that Sky Bet and the EFL had agreed for Sky Bet to continue its sponsorship up until 2024.

Coca-Cola had agreed a three-year deal to become the new sponsor of the League early in 2004, and in June 2004 it was announced that the League would be completely re-branded. The Second Division, which had been the third tier of English football since 1992 when the top 22 clubs broke away to form the Premier League, was renamed League One. The Premier League already awarded a Manager of the Month award, since the start of the 1993–94 season, and Coca-Cola introduced a Manager of the Month award for League One when they became sponsors at the start of the 2004–05 season; the first recipient was Mike Newell for his achievements in August 2004 with Luton Town.

== List of winners ==
Key

†	Award was shared with another manager

Month	Year (Note: Each year in the table is linked to the corresponding football season.)	Nationality	Manager	Team	Ref
August	2004	England	Mike Newell	Luton Town	
September	2004	England	Martin Allen	Brentford	
October	2004	England	Colin Todd	Bradford City	
November	2004	Scotland	Paul Sturrock	Sheffield Wednesday	
December	2004	England	Peter Taylor	Hull City	
January	2005	Scotland	Neale Cooper	Hartlepool United	
February	2005	England	Andy King	Swindon Town	
March	2005	England	Andy Ritchie	Barnsley	
April	2005	England	Mike Newell	Luton Town	
August	2005	England	Peter Jackson	Huddersfield Town	
September	2005	England	Steve Tilson	Southend United	
October	2005	England	Andy Ritchie	Barnsley	
November	2005	England	Dave Penney	Doncaster Rovers	
December	2005	England	Ronnie Moore	Oldham Athletic	
January	2006	England	Phil Parkinson	Colchester United	
February	2006	England	Martin Allen	Brentford	
March (Note: Nottingham Forest caretaker managers Frank Barlow and Ian McParland won the award jointly. In the tables they are counted as two separate recipients.)	2006	England	Frank Barlow†	Nottingham Forest	
March	2006	Scotland	Ian McParland†	Nottingham Forest	
April	2006	England	Gary Johnson	Bristol City	
August	2006	Scotland	Colin Calderwood	Nottingham Forest	
September	2006	England	Brian Laws	Scunthorpe United	
October	2006	Wales	Alan Knill	Rotherham United	
November	2006	Ireland	John Sheridan	Oldham Athletic	
December	2006	England	Simon Grayson	Blackpool	
January	2007	Ireland	Sean O'Driscoll	Doncaster Rovers	
February	2007	England	Nigel Adkins	Scunthorpe United	
March	2007	England	Gary Johnson	Bristol City	
April	2007	England	Simon Grayson	Blackpool	
August	2007	England	Dennis Wise	Leeds United	
September	2007	England	Dennis Wise	Leeds United	
October	2007	Spain	Roberto Martínez	Swansea City	
November	2007	Scotland	Colin Calderwood	Nottingham Forest	
December	2007	Spain	Roberto Martínez	Swansea City	
January	2008	Spain	Roberto Martínez	Swansea City	
February	2008	England	John Ward	Carlisle United	
March	2008	England	John Ward	Carlisle United	
April	2008	Scotland	Colin Calderwood	Nottingham Forest	
August	2008	England	Nigel Pearson	Leicester City	
September	2008	Wales	Kenny Jackett	Millwall	
October	2008	Wales	Paul Trollope	Bristol Rovers	
November	2008	Italy	Roberto Di Matteo	Milton Keynes Dons	
December	2008	England	Nigel Pearson	Leicester City	
January	2009	Scotland	Paul Lambert	Colchester United	
February	2009	Iceland	Gudjon Thordarson	Crewe Alexandra	
March	2009	Scotland	Darren Ferguson	Peterborough United	
April	2009	Italy	Roberto Di Matteo	Milton Keynes Dons	
August	2009	England	Phil Parkinson	Charlton Athletic	
September	2009	Wales	Paul Trollope	Bristol Rovers	
October	2009	Wales	Kenny Jackett	Millwall	
November	2009	England	Lee Clark	Huddersfield Town	
December	2009	Scotland	Paul Lambert	Norwich City	
January	2010	Scotland	Paul Lambert	Norwich City	
February	2010	England	Lee Clark	Huddersfield Town	
March	2010	Wales	Kenny Jackett	Millwall	
April	2010	England	Lee Clark	Huddersfield Town	
August	2010	Scotland	Alan Irvine	Sheffield Wednesday	
September	2010	Uruguay	Gus Poyet	Brighton & Hove Albion	
October	2010	England	Andy Scott	Brentford	
November	2010	England	Phil Parkinson	Charlton Athletic	
December	2010	England	Mick Wadsworth	Hartlepool United	
January	2011	England	Keith Hill	Rochdale	
February	2011	Scotland	Darren Ferguson	Peterborough United	
March	2011	Uruguay	Gus Poyet	Brighton & Hove Albion	
April	2011	England	Nigel Adkins	Southampton	
August	2011	England	Karl Robinson	Milton Keynes Dons	
September	2011	England	Martin Allen	Notts County	
October	2011	England	Lee Clark	Huddersfield Town	
November	2011	England	Chris Powell	Charlton Athletic	
December	2011	Northern Ireland	Danny Wilson	Sheffield United	
January	2012	England	Chris Powell	Charlton Athletic	
February	2012	England	Chris Powell	Charlton Athletic	
March	2012	England	Dave Jones	Sheffield Wednesday	
April	2012	England	Dave Jones	Sheffield Wednesday	
August	2012	England	Ronnie Moore	Tranmere Rovers	
September	2012	England	Ronnie Moore	Tranmere Rovers	
October	2012	Northern Ireland	Danny Wilson	Sheffield United	
November	2012	England	Eddie Howe	AFC Bournemouth	
December	2012	England	Mark Robins	Coventry City	
January	2013	England	Dean Smith	Walsall	
February	2013	Scotland	John Hughes	Hartlepool United	
March	2013	England	Russell Slade	Leyton Orient	
April	2013	England	Eddie Howe	AFC Bournemouth	
August	2013	England	Russell Slade	Leyton Orient	
September	2013	England	Simon Grayson	Preston North End	
October	2013	Scotland	Steven Pressley	Coventry City	
November	2013	Germany	Uwe Rösler	Brentford	
December	2013	England	Mark Warburton	Brentford	
January	2014	England	Russell Slade	Leyton Orient	
February	2014	England	Nigel Clough	Sheffield United	
March	2014	Wales	Kenny Jackett	Wolverhampton Wanderers	
April	2014	Scotland	Darren Ferguson	Peterborough United	
August	2014	Scotland	Darren Ferguson	Peterborough United	
September	2014	England	Steve Cotterill	Bristol City	
October	2014	England	Simon Grayson	Preston North End	
November	2014	England	Mark Cooper	Swindon Town	
December	2014	England	Phil Parkinson	Bradford City	
January	2015	England	Karl Robinson	Milton Keynes Dons	
February	2015	England	Simon Grayson	Preston North End	
March	2015	England	Steve Cotterill	Bristol City	
April	2015	England	Karl Robinson	Milton Keynes Dons	
August	2015	England	Dean Smith	Walsall	
September	2015	Netherlands	Jimmy Floyd Hasselbaink	Burton Albion	
October	2015	England	Mark Robins	Scunthorpe United	
November	2015	England	Graham Westley	Peterborough United	
December	2015	England	Nigel Adkins	Sheffield United	
January	2016	England	Lee Johnson	Barnsley	
February	2016	Scotland	Gary Caldwell	Wigan Athletic	
March	2016	England	Paul Heckingbottom	Barnsley	
April	2016	Scotland	Graham Alexander	Scunthorpe United	
August	2016	England	Phil Parkinson	Bolton Wanderers	
September	2016	England	David Flitcroft	Bury	
October	2016	England	Phil Parkinson	Bolton Wanderers	
November	2016	Scotland	Graham Alexander	Scunthorpe United	
December	2016	England	Keith Hill	Rochdale	
January	2017	Germany	Uwe Rösler	Fleetwood Town	
February	2017	England	Neil Harris	Millwall	
March	2017	England	Phil Parkinson	Bolton Wanderers	
April	2017	England	Chris Wilder	Sheffield United	
August	2017	Northern Ireland	Grant McCann	Peterborough United	
September	2017	England	Paul Hurst	Shrewsbury	
October	2017	England	Paul Cook	Wigan Athletic	
November	2017	England	Tony Mowbray	Blackburn Rovers	
December	2017	England	Paul Warne	Rotherham United	
January	2018	Wales	Steve Lovell	Gillingham	
February	2018	Scotland	Derek Adams	Plymouth Argyle	
March	2018	England	Paul Cook	Wigan Athletic	
April	2018	England	Paul Cook	Wigan Athletic	
August	2018	Scotland	Steve Evans	Peterborough United	
September	2018	Northern Ireland	Grant McCann	Doncaster Rovers	
October	2018	England	Mark Robins	Coventry City	
November	2018	England	Lee Bowyer	Charlton Athletic	
December	2018	Wales	Nathan Jones	Luton Town	
January	2019	Scotland	Stuart McCall	Scunthorpe United	
February	2019	Scotland	Jack Ross	Sunderland	
March	2019	England	Mick Harford	Luton Town	
April	2019	England	Lee Bowyer	Charlton Athletic	
August	2019	Scotland	Paul Lambert	Ipswich Town	
September	2019	England	Joey Barton	Fleetwood Town	
October	2019	Scotland	Darren Ferguson	Peterborough United	
November	2019	England	Gareth Ainsworth	Wycombe Wanderers	
December	2019	England	John Coleman	Accrington Stanley	
January	2020	England	Phil Parkinson	Sunderland	
February	2020	England	Mark Robins	Coventry City	
September	2020	Scotland	Paul Lambert	Ipswich Town	
October	2020	Scotland	Darren Ferguson	Peterborough United	
November	2020	England	John Coleman	Accrington Stanley	
December	2020	England	Steve Cotterill	Shrewsbury Town	
January	2021	Northern Ireland	Grant McCann	Hull City	
February	2021	Scotland	Darren Ferguson	Peterborough United	
March	2021	Scotland	Steve Evans	Gillingham	
April	2021	Northern Ireland	Grant McCann	Hull City	
August	2021	England	Lee Johnson	Sunderland	
September	2021	England	Liam Manning	Milton Keynes Dons	
October	2021	England	Ryan Lowe	Plymouth Argyle	
November	2021	England	Danny Cowley	Portsmouth	
December	2021	England	Lee Johnson	Sunderland	
January	2022	England	Liam Manning	Milton Keynes Dons	
February	2022	England	Paul Warne	Rotherham United	
March	2022	England	Steven Schumacher	Plymouth Argyle	
April	2022	England	Gareth Ainsworth	Wycombe Wanderers	
August	2022	England	Danny Cowley	Portsmouth	
September	2022	England	Steven Schumacher	Plymouth Argyle	
October	2022	England	Steven Schumacher	Plymouth Argyle	
November	2022	Northern Ireland	Michael Duff	Barnsley	
December	2022	Northern Ireland	Michael Duff	Barnsley	
January	2023	England	Paul Warne	Derby County	
February	2023	Northern Ireland	Michael Duff	Barnsley	
March	2023	Northern Ireland	Kieran McKenna	Ipswich Town	
April	2023	Northern Ireland	Kieran McKenna	Ipswich Town	
August	2023	England	Liam Manning	Oxford United	
September	2023	England	John Mousinho	Portsmouth	
October	2023	England	Ian Evatt	Bolton Wanderers	
November	2023	England	Ian Evatt	Bolton Wanderers	
December	2023	England	Paul Warne	Derby County	
January	2024	England	Richie Wellens	Leyton Orient	
February	2024	England	John Mousinho	Portsmouth	
March	2024	England	Paul Warne	Derby County	
April	2024	England	Matt Bloomfield	Wycombe Wanderers	
August	2024	England	Phil Parkinson	Wrexham	
September	2024	England	Steve Bruce	Blackpool	
October	2024	England	Matt Bloomfield	Wycombe Wanderers	
November	2024	England	Matt Bloomfield	Wycombe Wanderers	
December	2024	England	Richie Wellens	Leyton Orient	
January	2025	England	Richie Wellens	Leyton Orient	
February	2025	Wales	Chris Davies	Birmingham City	
March	2025	England	Phil Parkinson	Wrexham	
April	2025	Wales	Chris Davies	Birmingham City	
August	2025	Ireland	Brian Barry-Murphy	Cardiff City	
September	2025	England	Michael Skubala	Lincoln City	
October	2025	England	Dave Challinor	Stockport County	
November	2025	Ireland	Conor Hourihane	Barnsley	
December	2025	Ireland	Brian Barry-Murphy	Cardiff City	
January	2026	England	Michael Skubala	Lincoln City	
February	2026	England	Michael Skubala	Lincoln City	
March	2026	England	Tom Cleverley	Plymouth Argyle	
April	2026	England	Michael Skubala	Lincoln City	
August	2026	England	Martin Drury	Huddersfield Town	
September	2026	England	Leam Richardson	Reading	
October	2026	England	Martin Drury	Huddersfield Town	

== Multiple winners ==
Up to and including the October 2026 award.

- The below table lists all the people that have won on more than one occasion.

Rank	Manager	Wins
1st	(England) Phil Parkinson	10
2nd	(Scotland) Darren Ferguson	7
3rd	(England) Lee Clark	5
3rd	(England) Simon Grayson	5
3rd	(Scotland) Paul Lambert	5
3rd	(England) Paul Warne	5
7th	(Wales) Kenny Jackett	4
7th	(Northern Ireland) Grant McCann	4
7th	(England) Mark Robins	4
7th	(England) Michael Skubala	4
11th	(England) Nigel Adkins	3
11th	(England) Martin Allen	3
11th	(England) Matt Bloomfield	3
11th	(Scotland) Colin Calderwood	3
11th	(England) Paul Cook	3
11th	(England) Steve Cotterill	3
11th	(Northern Ireland) Michael Duff	3
11th	(England) Lee Johnson	3
11th	(England) Liam Manning	3
11th	(Spain) Roberto Martínez	3
11th	(England) Ronnie Moore	3
11th	(England) Chris Powell	3
11th	(England) Karl Robinson	3
11th	(England) Steven Schumacher	3
11th	(England) Russell Slade	3
11th	(England) Richie Wellens	3
27th	(England) Gareth Ainsworth	2
27th	(Scotland) Graham Alexander	2
27th	(Republic of Ireland) Brian Barry-Murphy	2
27th	(England) Lee Bowyer	2
27th	(England) John Coleman	2
27th	(England) Danny Cowley	2
27th	(Wales) Chris Davies	2
27th	(Italy) Roberto Di Matteo	2
27th	(England) Martin Drury	2
27th	(Scotland) Steve Evans	2
27th	(England) Ian Evatt	2
27th	(England) Keith Hill	2
27th	(England) Eddie Howe	2
27th	(England) Gary Johnson	2
27th	(England) Dave Jones	2
27th	(Northern Ireland) Kieran McKenna	2
27th	(England) Mike Newell	2
27th	(England) John Mousinho	2
27th	(England) Nigel Pearson	2
27th	(Uruguay) Gus Poyet	2
27th	(England) Andy Ritchie	2
27th	(Germany) Uwe Rösler	2
27th	(England) Dean Smith	2
27th	(Wales) Paul Trollope	2
27th	(England) Mick Wadsworth	2
27th	(England) John Ward	2
27th	(Northern Ireland) Danny Wilson	2
27th	(England) Dennis Wise	2

== Awards won by nationality ==
Up to and including the October 2026 award.

Country	Wins
England	132
Scotland	29
Northern Ireland	11
Wales	11
Ireland	5
Spain	3
Germany	2
Italy	2
Uruguay	2
Iceland	1
Netherlands	1

== Awards won by club ==
Up to and including the October 2026 award.

Club	Wins
Peterborough United	10
Barnsley	8
Charlton Athletic	7
Huddersfield Town	7
Milton Keynes Dons	7
Leyton Orient	6
Plymouth Argyle	6
Scunthorpe United	6
Bolton Wanderers	5
Brentford	5
Nottingham Forest	5
Sheffield United	5
Wycombe Wanderers	5
Bristol City	4
Coventry City	4
Ipswich Town	4
Lincoln City	4
Luton Town	4
Millwall	4
Portsmouth	4
Sheffield Wednesday	4
Sunderland	4
Wigan Athletic	4
Blackpool	3
Derby County	3
Doncaster Rovers	3
Hartlepool United	3
Hull City	3
Preston North End	3
Rotherham United	3
Swansea City	3
AFC Bournemouth	2
Accrington Stanley	2
Birmingham City	2
Bradford City	2
Brighton & Hove Albion	2
Bristol Rovers	2
Cardiff City	2
Carlisle United	2
Colchester United	2
Fleetwood Town	2
Gillingham	2
Leeds United	2
Leicester City	2
Norwich City	2
Oldham Athletic	2
Rochdale	2
Shrewsbury Town	2
Swindon Town	2
Tranmere Rovers	2
Walsall	2
Wrexham	2
Blackburn Rovers	1
Burton Albion	1
Bury	1
Crewe Alexandra	1
Notts County	1
Oxford United	1
Reading	1
Southampton	1
Southend United	1
Stockport County	1
Wolverhampton Wanderers	1
