= It's Always Sunny in Philadelphia season 18 =

Season of television series

It's Always Sunny in Philadelphia
- Season 18
- Promotional poster
- Starring: Charlie Day; Glenn Howerton; Rob McElhenney; Kaitlin Olson; Danny DeVito
- No. of episodes: 10

Release
- Original network: FXX; FX
- Original release: August 17 – October 12, 2026

Season chronology
- ← Previous; Season 17

The eighteenth season of the American television sitcom series It's Always Sunny in Philadelphia premiered simultaneously on FXX and FX on August 17, 2026 and concluded on October 12, consisting of ten episodes. The season stars Charlie Day, Glenn Howerton, Rob McElhenney, Kaitlin Olson, and Danny DeVito as "the Gang". Episodes have next day availability on the FXNOW website and Hulu.

== Cast ==
=== Main cast ===
- Charlie Day as Charlie Kelly
- Glenn Howerton as Dennis Reynolds
- Rob McElhenney as Ronald "Mac" McDonald
- Kaitlin Olson as Deandra "Dee" Reynolds
- Danny DeVito as Frank Reynolds

=== Recurring cast ===
- Mary Elizabeth Ellis as The Waitress
- Artemis Pebdani as Artemis
- Sandy Martin as Mrs. Mac
- Andrew Friedman as Uncle Jack
- David Hornsby as Cricket

=== Guest cast ===
- Carol Kane as Samantha
- Mary Lynn Rajskub as Gail the Snail
- Gregory Scott Cummins as Luther / Donald
- Nate Corddry as Mortician
- Sam Song Li as Jie
- Elaine Kao as Professor Lee
- Nick Kroll as Kevin
- Guillermo del Toro as Pappy McPoyle
- Jimmi Simpson as Liam McPoyle
- Nate Mooney as Ryan McPoyle
- Tyler Tomás Perez as Darren
- Dan Ahdoot as Mitch
- John Ales as Philip
- Brad Beyer as Coach Bob D'Marco
- Benjamin Mackey as Timmy Talhoon

== Production ==
=== Development ===
After the fourteenth season aired, It's Always Sunny in Philadelphia was renewed for four additional seasons in December 2020, intending to take it up to season 18. The season comprises ten episodes, making it the first ten-episode season since season 14 in 2019.

=== Filming ===
Filming for the eighteenth season began in February 2026 and completed in April 2026.

== Episodes ==
No. overall	No. in season	Title	Directed by	Written by	Original release date	Prod. code	US viewers (millions) (Note: Combined viewership on FXX and FX.)
179	1	"Frank Marries a Corpse"	Todd Biermann	Charlie Day	August 17, 2026	XIP18001	N/A
While Dee enlists Artemis, Gail and the Waitress to help break up Frank and Samantha, the men try to help Frank prepare for his wedding, even as Mac and Charlie deal with personal issues relating to their mothers.
180	2	"Dennis and Dee Don't Get Rich"	Todd Biermann	Charlie Day & Glenn Howerton	August 17, 2026	XIP18002	N/A
Following the deaths of Samantha and Bonnie, Frank and Charlie plan their funeral, while Dennis and Dee try to get the former's inheritance. Meanwhile, Mac reconnects with his father.
181	3	"The Gang Gets Tested"	Richie Keen	Charlie Day & Keyonna Taylor	August 24, 2026	XIP18007	0.24 (FXX)
To prove they actually are smart, Dennis, Dee and Mac decide to go to college, while Charlie gets tested for neurological disorders. Frank, meanwhile, corrupts a college student.
182	4	"2026: A Virtual Insanity"	Heath Cullens	Rob Rosell & Vanessa McGee	August 31, 2026	XIP18004	0.29
When the Gang's RV runs out of gas on their way to a Jamiroquai concert, they are forced to interact with the homeless population of Philadelphia.
183	5	"The Gang Goes to the Ren Faire"	Richie Keen	Dave Chernin & John Chernin & Rob Rosell	September 7, 2026	XIP18008	0.39
At a Renaissance Fair, Mac, Dennis and Dee try to do the most memorable thing to be put on the Quilt of Legends, which Charlie tries to create a song about. Frank, meanwhile, attempts to buy the land the fair is on from its owners, the McPoyles.
184	6	"The War on Alcohol"	Dave Chernin & John Chernin	Dave Chernin & John Chernin	September 14, 2026	XIP18005	0.22
After realizing that non-alcoholic beer is replacing alcohol in society, the Gang try to bring people back to drinking in bars. Mac and Charlie attempt to recruit blue-collar workers, while the others attempt the same with white-collar workers.
185	7	"Gilligan's Island: A Conspiracy Theorist's Paradise"	Heath Cullens	David Hornsby & Biniam Bizuneh	September 21, 2026	XIP18009	0.12 (FXX)
During a storm, Mac and Charlie discuss conspiracy theories regarding Gilligan's Island, which spills into their real lives. The rest of the Gang are acting very strangely, and there's fake rain and synthetic spy camera pigeons around the place. What is going on?
186	8	"Mac and Dennis Tear Their ACLs"	Heath Cullens	David Hornsby	September 28, 2026	XIP18006	0.24
When Mac and Dennis injure themselves debating who came up with the idea for the year's Christmas card, Charlie is forced to care for them. Meanwhile, Frank and Dee, excluded from the idea, attempt to figure it out and use it themselves. This episode is dedicated to William Minkin and Richard “Rocky” Nichols.
187	9	"Frank's Team: A Dark Day for Baseball"	Heath Cullens	Charlie Day & Rob Mac & Ross Maloney	October 5, 2026	XIP18010	0.24
In an attempt to get better ratings for the bar, Frank sponsors a baseball team, but the Gang soon become obsessed with running it their own way.
188	10	"The Guys Have a Sleepover"	Todd Biermann	Charlie Day & Glenn Howerton	October 12, 2026	XIP18003	0.23
After Dee gets Lasik, the men have a sleepover to avoid having to take care of her, but they pull juvenile hijinks that soon get out of hand. Dee, left alone, enlists Artemis to help her instead.

== Release ==
The season premiered with two episodes on August 17, 2026.

== Reception ==
On Rotten Tomatoes, the season has an approval rating of 100% based on 9 reviews with an average score of 7.3/10.
