= Bob Meyrowitz =

Co-creator of the Ultimate Fighting Championship

Robert "Bob" Meyrowitz is an American entrepreneur. He was the co-creator of the Ultimate Fighting Championship (UFC), the largest MMA promotion in world.

== Background ==
In 1973, Meyrowitz was a founder of D.I.R. Broadcasting and a creator of the syndicated radio series, the King Biscuit Flower Hour.

In the late 1980s he started Semaphore Entertainment Group (SEG), which was one of the first groups to develop content for pay per view.

In 1999, Meyrowitz created eYada.com, an internet talk radio station, ceasing in 2001.

In 2001, Meyrowitz was the owner of the UFC who sold it to Frank Fertitta III and Lorenzo Fertitta (Zuffa).

In January 2008, Meyrowitz announced the formation of his new MMA company, YAMMA Pit Fighting. YAMMA was a joint venture between Meyrowitz's company, Rope Partners, and Live Nation. Yamma folded the same year, holding only one event on April 11, 2008.

On June 10, 2016, Meyrowitz was inducted to the Contributor wing of the UFC Hall of Fame.
