= The Gang Goes to the Ren Faire =

- It's Always Sunny in Philadelphia episode
- Episode no.: Season 18; Episode 5
- Directed by: Richie Keen
- Written by: Dave Chernin; John Chernin; Rob Rosell
- Cinematography by: John Tanzer
- Editing by: Scott Draper; Mallory Yarnall
- Production code: XIP18008
- Original air date: September 7, 2026
- Running time: 22 minutes

Guest appearances
- Nick Kroll as Kevin; Jimmi Simpson as Liam McPoyle; Nate Mooney as Ryan McPoyle; Guillermo del Toro as Pappy McPoyle

Episode chronology
← Previous "2026: A Virtual Insanity"	Next → "The War on Alcohol"
- It's Always Sunny in Philadelphia season 18

"The Gang Goes to the Ren Faire" is the fifth episode of the eighteenth season of the American sitcom television series It's Always Sunny in Philadelphia. It is the 183rd overall episode of the series and was written by executive producers Dave Chernin, John Chernin, Rob Rosell, and directed by Richie Keen. It originally aired on FX and FXX on September 7, 2026.

The series follows "The Gang", a group of five misfit friends: twins Dennis and Deandra "(Sweet) Dee" Reynolds, their friends Charlie Kelly and Ronald "Mac" McDonald, and Frank Reynolds, Dennis's and Dee's legal father. The Gang runs the fictional Paddy's Pub, an unsuccessful Irish bar in South Philadelphia. In the episode, the Gang tries to get their names in a quilt for a Renaissance fair, while Frank tries to court the owners to buy the fair.

According to Nielsen Media Research, the episode was seen by an estimated 0.39 million viewers and gained a 0.09 ratings share among adults aged 18–49. The episode received mostly positive reviews from critics, who praised the return of the McPoyles to the series.

== Plot ==
The Gang attends the Renaissance fair to participate in the Quilt of Legends, which could put their names in a quilt that could be used in subsequent years. The guys also constantly downplay Dee's remarks that women are the driving force of stories.

Frank asks to meet the owner of the Faire, planning to buy it to demolish it and build a data center. However, he is astonished to learn that the McPoyles, led by Pappy, own the Faire and refuse to give it to him. After Frank questions Pappy's honor, they get him to accept a royal challenge to win the land, consisting of a staring contest. However, the contest is ruined when Mac interrupts them with an omelette that Frank asked him for. The McPoyles then suggest a new challenge: a joust between Mac and Liam. If Mac wins, the McPoyles will cede their land; if Liam wins, they will remove Mac's eye for Pappy. Frank gets Mac to agree, promising to put him in the quilt.

Dennis has sex with a maid after bargaining with a man, but the man reveals that woman was actually a prostitute. Dennis sleeps with another maid, having Charlie watch them. However, the woman reveals she feels guilty because she is married and her husband is paralytic, disturbing Charlie. At the jousting, Liam easily wins and stabs the other to remove his eye. However, it is revealed that Mac switched places with Ryan, horrifying the McPoyles. Dee subsequently reveals to the Gang that she was responsible for switching places, proving she drove the story.

== Production ==
=== Development ===
In August 2026, FX reported that the fifth episode of the eighteenth season would be titled "The Gang Goes to the Ren Faire", and was to be written by executive producers Dave Chernin, John Chernin, Rob Rosell, and directed by Richie Keen. This marked Dave Chernin's 12th writing credit, John Chernin's 11th writing credit, Rosell's 29th writing credit, and Keen's 17th directing credit.

== Reception ==
=== Viewers ===
In its original American broadcast, "The Gang Goes to the Ren Faire" was seen by an estimated 0.26 million household viewers and gained a 0.05 ratings share among adults aged 18–49 in FX, and 0.13 million household viewers and gained a 0.04 ratings share among adults aged 18–49 in FXX. Combined, the episode was seen by an estimated 0.39 million household viewers and a 0.09 ratings share among adults aged 18–49. This means that 0.09 percent of all households with televisions watched the episode. This was a 34% increase in viewership from the previous episode, which was watched by an estimated 0.29 million household viewers with a 0.07 in the 18–49 demographics.

=== Critical reviews ===
"The Gang Goes to the Ren Faire" earned mostly positive reviews from critics. Meredith Loftus of Collider wrote, "The McPoyles have been at odds with the Gang over the years, with Liam and Ryan's last appearing in Season 16's "The Gang Goes Bowling." It's been even longer since audiences have seen Academy Award-winning Guillermo del Toro as the McPoyle patriarch, Pappy, in Season 11's "McPoyle vs. Ponderosa: The Trial of the Century." The trio returns midway through the season, where it's revealed they own the local Ren Faire. In a season that feels familiar, the McPoyles' comeback is a welcome one that resurrects a classic rivalry."

Grant Hermanns of Screen Rant wrote, "Between some still-clever gags, the hilarious returns of Guillermo del Toro's Pappy and the rest of the McPoyle clan, and subtle social commentary, it's not clear how much longer the show ultimately has in its lifetime, but Howerton, Day, Mac and Kaitlin Olson are still keeping things fun enough to stick around for more."

Jerrica Tisdale of Telltale TV gave the episode a 4.2 star rating out of 5 and wrote, "“The Gang Goes to the Ren Faire” takes unexpected paths, has some very dark material, great guest stars, and a bright spot for Dee fans (despite her not being on this episode as much as the others). It may be one of Season 18's best." Sam Huang of TV Fanatic gave the episode a 3.8 star rating out of 5 and wrote, "Full of incredible individual moments and shocking twists, It's Always Sunny in Philadelphia Season 18 Episode 5, “The Gang Goes to Ren Faire,” has become an instant classic for me."
