= Bill Minkin =

American comedian, singer and artist (1941–2026)

William Minkin (October 17, 1941 – February 26, 2026) was an American comedian, singer and recording artist who performed political satire, under the names Senator Bobby and Senator Everett McKinley.

== Education ==
Minkin graduated from the Syracuse University College of Liberal Arts in 1963.

== Career ==
Minkin was a member of the Hardly-Worthit Players, a comedy troupe that released an album of skits. In 1967, Parkway Records released a 45 rpm single of Minkin singing two versions of the Troggs' 1966 hit song, "Wild Thing". On side one, Minkin uses the alias Senator Bobby in his impression of Democratic US Senator Robert F. Kennedy singing "Wild Thing". On side two, the comedian uses the alias Senator Everett McKinley in his impression of Republican US Senator Everett Dirksen singing the same song. The single reached number 20 on the US Billboard Hot 100 chart. The Senator Bobby version is credited on the single's label to Minkin (misspelled as "Menkin") and the group the Hardly-Worthit Players. It has appeared on reissues of the group's 1966 Parkway album entitled The Hardly-Worthit Report, along with the Cameo-Parkway album Boston Soul by the same performers. He released a follow-up single in 1967, also a satirical "Senator Bobby" style cover of the Donovan Leitch song "Mellow Yellow" on the Cameo-Parkway label. In 1977, Minkin married Ina Meibach, an attorney whose clientele included The Who, Labelle, Peter Gabriel, Blue Öyster Cult, Janis Ian, Monty Python and Parliament-Funkadelic. Minkin was the host of the long-running King Biscuit Flower Hour radio concert series.

== Death ==
Minkin died on February 26, 2026, at the age of 84.

He made a cameo as a barfly on season 16's The Gang Goes Bowling and his death was honored in a dedication at the end the eighth episode of the eighteenth season of Its Always Sunny in Philadelphia.
