= The Gang Gets Tested =

- It's Always Sunny in Philadelphia episode
- Episode no.: Season 18; Episode 3
- Directed by: Todd Biermann
- Written by: Charlie Day; Keyonna Taylor
- Cinematography by: John Tanzer
- Editing by: Scott Draper
- Production code: XIP18007
- Original air date: August 24, 2026
- Running time: 23 minutes

Guest appearances
- Sam Song Li as Jie; Elaine Kao as Professor Lee

Episode chronology
| ← Previous "Dennis and Dee Don't Get Rich" | Next → "2026: A Virtual Insanity" |
- It's Always Sunny in Philadelphia season 18

"The Gang Gets Tested" is the third episode of the eighteenth season of the American sitcom television series It's Always Sunny in Philadelphia. It is the 181st overall episode of the series and was written by executive producer Charlie Day and supervising producer Keyonna Taylor, and directed by Richie Keen. It originally aired on FX and FXX on August 24, 2026.

The series follows "The Gang", a group of five misfit friends: twins Dennis and Deandra "(Sweet) Dee" Reynolds, their friends Charlie Kelly and Ronald "Mac" McDonald, and Frank Reynolds, Dennis's and Dee's legal father. The Gang runs the fictional Paddy's Pub, an unsuccessful Irish bar in South Philadelphia. In the episode, the gang returns to college to prove they are actually smart, while Frank tries to corrupt a student.

According to Nielsen Media Research, the episode was seen by an estimated 0.24 million viewers and gained a 0.10 ratings share among adults aged 18–49. The episode received positive reviews from critics, who praised the humor, particularly over Charlie's subplot.

== Plot ==
The Gang takes a neuropsychological test, which states that Dennis and Dee have ADHD and that Mac is not intelligent. However, Charlie's test is deemed undefined and he is asked to come back for more tests.

Wanting to prove the test wrong, Dennis, Dee and Mac return to school, where they are surprised to see Frank enrolling as well, as he feels inspired by the film Back to School. Frank takes a student, Jie, to party with him but is bored by how different his lifestyle is. He tries to get him to defecate in the dean's office, but their plan backfires due to security cameras. They then go to a college party, where Frank fails to get a girl to have sex with Jie. When the girl's boyfriend threatens them, Frank challenges them to perform a synchronized dive the following day. Charlie undergoes some tests with the college's professors, who are astounded by his ideas and logic reasonings.

With a test on the way, Dennis decides to have sex with their elderly teacher, while Dee resorts to using crack. Mac struggles to learn anything, despite a fellow student's help. Charlie's test concludes with the biggest scientific discovery of the past century, but Charlie decides to just leave to see Frank and Jie take the dive. Frank convinces Jie to jump first; while Jie completes the dive, he loses consciousness. When Dennis, Dee and Mac take the test, they are confused to see they have no results. They realize they forgot to enroll themselves in college in the first place. Charlie and Frank joins them in leaving school, declaring that it is pointless.

== Production ==
=== Development ===
In July 2026, FX reported that the third episode of the eighteenth season would be titled "The Gang Gets Tested", and was to be written by executive producer Charlie Day and supervising producer Keyonna Taylor, and directed by Richie Keen. This marked Day's 74th writing credit, Taylor's 3rd writing credit, and Keen's 16th directing credit.

== Reception ==
=== Viewers ===
In its original American broadcast, "The Gang Gets Tested" was seen by an estimated 0.24 million household viewers and gained a 0.10 ratings share among adults aged 18–49 in FXX. This means that 0.10 percent of all households with televisions watched the episode.

=== Critical reviews ===
"The Gang Gets Tested" earned positive reviews from critics. Meredith Loftus of Collider wrote, "Both of these plots borrow from previous episodes — Season 2's "Dennis and Dee Go on Welfare" and Season 9's "Flowers for Charlie." That doesn't mean Season 18's version isn't entertaining, but it's treading familiar water that only serves as a reminder of great episodes throughout the series' run to date."

Grant Hermanns of Screen Rant wrote that the episode "features so many references to the Rodney Dangerfield classic Back to School as the group all head to college for varying reasons that it feels less like they organically came up with the idea for showcasing The Gang's lack of intelligence, and more like someone caught the movie on TV and thought twisting its formula with Danny DeVito's Frank seemed like a good idea."

Keegan Kelly of Cracked wrote, "Every individual arc in “The Gang Gets Tested” treaded familiar territory – Dee's drug addiction, Dennis' manipulation of Mac, Dennis seducing his way through a scheme, Frank struggling to differentiate real life from a movie – but Charlie's story here hit the hardest because of how it recontextualized what is arguably the most tortured mind in the core Always Sunny cast." Sam Huang of TV Fanatic gave the episode a 3.5 star rating out of 5 and wrote, "The first two episodes of Season 18 had me hopeful in terms of believing in the show's potential to find its magic again without repeating. And while the idea of Dennis and Dee getting diagnosed with ADHD while Mac and Charlie don't sounds great, the episode doesn't live up to its premise."

=== Accolades ===
TVLine named Charlie Day as a honorable mention for the "Performer of the Week" for the week of August 29, 2026, for his performance in the episode. The site wrote, "Is Charlie Kelly so dumb, he's actually smart? Or is he so dumb that he makes all of us dumber just by listening to him? It's that eternal mystery that makes Charlie Day's sublime performance on It's Always Sunny in Philadelphia so damn enjoyable, even 18 seasons in."
