= Frank Marries a Corpse =

- It's Always Sunny in Philadelphia episode
- Episode no.: Season 18; Episode 1
- Directed by: Todd Biermann
- Written by: Charlie Day
- Cinematography by: John Tanzer
- Editing by: Scott Draper
- Production code: XIP18001
- Original air date: August 17, 2026
- Running time: 23 minutes

Guest appearances
- Mary Elizabeth Ellis as The Waitress; Sandy Martin as Mrs. Mac; Andrew Friedman as Uncle Jack; Artemis Pebdani as Artemis Dubois; Mary Lynn Rajskub as Gail the Snail; Carol Kane as Sam

Episode chronology
← Previous "The Golden Bachelor Live"	Next → "Dennis and Dee Don't Get Rich"
- It's Always Sunny in Philadelphia season 18

"Frank Marries a Corpse" is the first episode of the eighteenth season of the American sitcom television series It's Always Sunny in Philadelphia. It is the 179th overall episode of the series and was written by executive producer Charlie Day, and directed by co-executive producer Todd Biermann. It originally aired on FX and FXX on August 17, 2026.

The series follows "The Gang", a group of five misfit friends: twins Dennis and Deandra "(Sweet) Dee" Reynolds, their friends Charlie Kelly and Ronald "Mac" McDonald, and Frank Reynolds, Dennis's and Dee's legal father. The Gang runs the fictional Paddy's Pub, an unsuccessful Irish bar in South Philadelphia. In the episode, Frank is anxious over his incoming wedding to Sam, while Dee sets out to sabotage it as she believes she might be a con artist.

The episode received generally positive reviews from critics, who praised the episode's humor and character development. However, some were polarized over the decision to kill off Sam.

== Plot ==
Frank is about to marry Sam, but has cold feet moments before wedding. Charlie brings the ashes of his defunct mother in an urn to the wedding. However, Mac invited his mother, and he still has not come out to her.

Dee believes that Sam is a con artist and sets out to prove it, and enlists the Waitress, Artemis and Gail the Snail to help her as the bridesmaids. She exposes Frank's sexual relationship with Gail despite their family status, his many legal problems, and suggesting that Frank gave a sexually transmitted infection. Sam sees through her scheme and reveals that her father invented a specific rubber chicken brand and as such, she is a billionaire. She still wants Dee to support her marriage, naming her in her will and placing her as he inheritor when they get married. However, Sam dies while taking a nap. When Dennis finds out, he reveals he was notified of her billionaire status and he is also named in her will. Dennis then suggests having a dead Sam pretend to marry Frank in front of everyone, so they can get her inheritance.

The wedding is held at Paddy's Pub, with Frank struggling to maintain good posture. Mac serves as the priest and accidentally comes out in front of his mother, to which she simply says "no shit." Dee walks Sam's corpse and covers her face, making her nod her head to marry Frank. However, Frank demands to kiss Sam, and the crowd realizes she is dead. A news report confirms that her death is due to a flesh-eating bacteria she contracted when she had sex with Frank in a pond.

== Production ==
=== Development ===
In July 2026, FX reported that the first episode of the eighteenth season would be titled "Frank Marries a Corpse", and was to be written by executive producer Charlie Day, and directed by co-executive producer Todd Biermann. This was Day's 72nd writing credit, and Biermann's 19th directing credit.

== Reception ==
=== Critical reviews ===
"Frank Marries a Corpse" earned generally positive reviews from critics. Meredith Loftus of Collider wrote, "this season features a loving tribute to Lynne Marie Stewart, who passed away in February 2025. While Season 17 included a montage for her, the Season 18 premiere acknowledges that the show didn't properly mourn her passing, so Charlie sets out to honor his mom, Bonnie, in epic fashion. From a new song by Charlie to a memorial during the annual Mummers Parade, It's Always Sunny Season 18 succeeds in honoring Stewart's memory."

Grant Hermanns of Screen Rant was critical of Sam's death, "it feels as though it detracts from Day's ultimate goal for Stewart's tribute, and makes every subplot feel rushed. Even more notable, as revealed in the trailer, is the near-immediate killing of Kane's character in the season, which kneecaps the show's possibilities to experiment with Paddy's likely-to-fail efforts to grow beyond the Philly city limits."

Jerrica Tisdale of Telltale TV gave the episode a 3.9 star rating out of 5 and wrote, "We have witnessed a lot from the gang over 18 seasons, but “Frank Marries A Corpse” manages to feel new and unique. It just uses some of the classic gags we love, such as Dennis's psychopathic behavior, which Dee often exhibits as well, and Charlie's musical abilities." Sam Huang of TV Fanatic gave the episode a 2-episode premiere a 4 star rating out of 5 and wrote, "The stand-out moment has to be Charlie singing a somber song about his mom while a stripper dances in front of a frozen Frank. It's impossible to watch that scene while keeping a straight face. While the situation is hilarious, the show never makes fun of Charlie's sadness about losing his mom, even when he turns the joint funeral into an extravagant clown parade."
