= Frank Barlow (footballer) =

English footballer and manager

Personal information
- Full name: Frank Charles Barlow
- Date of birth: 15 October 1946 (age 80)
- Place of birth: Mexborough, England
- Position: Midfielder

Youth career
- Sheffield United

Senior career*
Years	Team	Apps	(Gls)
1965–1972	Sheffield United	121	(2)
1972–1976	Chesterfield	140	(3)
1974	→ Boston Minutemen (loan)	20	(0)

Managerial career
- 1980–1983: Chesterfield
- 1984–1987: Scunthorpe United
- 2006: Nottingham Forest (joint caretaker)
- 2007: Wigan Athletic (caretaker)
- 2011–2013: Sheffield United (assistant manager)
- * Club domestic league appearances and goals

Frank Charles Barlow (born 15 October 1946) is an English former footballer who moved into coaching and club management since retiring from playing. Born in Mexborough, England, he spent the bulk of his playing career at Sheffield United before moving to Chesterfield for a spell.

After retiring from playing he moved into management and coaching, managing Chesterfield and Scunthorpe United before having spells as caretaker manager with both Nottingham Forest and Wigan Athletic. He is without a club after leaving his post of assistant manager at Sheffield United in April 2013.

== Playing career ==
=== Sheffield United ===
Barlow was a defensive midfielder who started his football career with Sheffield United after being spotted playing for Don and Dearne Schoolboys during which time he had captained the England Schoolboys team. After signing professional terms in 1965 at the age of 19 he was to remain at Bramall Lane for seven years but never cemented his place in the first team during his tenure. Seen more as a squad player available to fill in when other teammates were unavailable it was only during the 1969–70 season that he played regularly in the Football League. Despite this he went on to make over 120 appearances for the Blades during his seven-year stay.

=== Chesterfield ===
Barlow was bought by Chesterfield in 1972 for a then club record fee of £15,000, where he was to remain for the remainder of his playing career. Spending four years on Chesterfield's books he made 140+ appearances, scoring three times, before a series of knee injuries forced him to retire following which he became first team coach at the age of 31.

== Management and coaching ==
=== Chesterfield ===
Installed as first team coach after he retired from playing, Barlow briefly became the caretaker manager of Chesterfield following the sacking of Joe Shaw in 1976 before being made the full-time manager in 1980 after the departure of Arthur Cox, although he protested several times throughout his reign that he didn't want the job. He said he was always more comfortable as a coach than as a boss.

Despite this, he brought success to the club in his first season as manager, winning the Anglo-Scottish Cup (after beating Notts County 2–1) and the divisional manager of the month award for March 1981. His refreshing honesty was heavily appreciated by the supporters and he managed to keep the club in touch with promotion, despite a worsening financial situation, which ultimately led to the club being relegated in his second season with Chesterfield. When a new board of directors came in, the whole coaching team was sacked, but Barlow was offered a place among the new setup. He declined out of loyalty to his coaching staff and thus left with his dignity and self-respect intact, without carrying much of the blame for Chesterfield's dire relegation season.

=== Scunthorpe United ===
Barlow almost immediately returned to football, becoming the assistant manager at Scunthorpe United under Allan Clarke, being promoted to manager a year later when Clarke resigned. Again he said he didn't want the job, but nevertheless he had a fair amount of success, keeping them clear of relegation in 1984 and then maintaining a respectable league position the following season.

He left Scunthorpe in 1987 and did not return to management for almost 20 years, concentrating mostly on coaching and various other back-room posts.

=== 19 years in the shadows ===
Barlow made an immediate return to football, this time a youth and reserve team coach for Barnsley. A year later he joined Sheffield Wednesday as a coach, where he remained for 7 years until 1996. Barlow then moved to Birmingham City with Trevor Francis for 2 years before returning to Sheffield Wednesday as assistant manager and then onto Bristol City. He left in 2004, joining Paul Merson as assistant manager at Walsall but resigned in January 2005 after a 5–0 defeat at the hands of Colchester United almost cost Merson his job.

=== Back in the spotlight with Nottingham Forest ===
In January 2005, Nottingham Forest's new manager Gary Megson brought Barlow to the club as assistant manager. When Megson was unable to avoid relegation into League One of the Football League, and then struggled to maintain a promotion push, he left the club 'by mutual consent' and Barlow was made co-caretaker manager along with Forest's reserve team coach Ian McParland. It was a position Barlow hoped he would never be in again after leaving Scunthorpe almost 20 years before.

Barlow sparked a remarkable turn around on Trentside, and led Forest to an unbeaten run of 10 games, with 6 straight wins just missing out on equalling a club record of 7 straight wins when they fell to a 3–2 defeat at the hands of Hartlepool United. Frank Barlow was named joint Manager of the Month with McParland for March 2006.

When Colin Calderwood was appointed as the new boss, Barlow and McParland reverted to coaching roles with Forest.

=== Hull City ===
Hull City appointed Frank Barlow as caretaker manager on 28 June 2006 due to protracted negotiations in securing the release of their managerial target, Phil Parkinson, from his contract with Colchester. This appointment was only to last two days as Parkinson was appointed manager on 30 June 2006, with Barlow reverting to the role of his assistant.

Barlow's role was to be short lived however, a coaching staff re-shuffle following the Tigers' disappointing start to the season saw Barlow leave the club in October 2006.

=== Bradford City ===
Following his departure from The KC Stadium Barlow moved to Bradford City as assistant to caretaker manager David Wetherall.

=== Wigan Athletic ===
In June 2007 Wigan Athletic appointed Barlow as the assistant manager to Chris Hutchings. Barlow, now 60, was taken on for his vast experience in the game, as Hutchings enthused "I need someone I can trust implicitly when it comes to football knowledge, you can't get more experience than he's got, he knows players inside-out." After Hutchings was sacked in November 2007, Barlow was named as Wigan's caretaker manager. When Steve Bruce was appointed the club's new manager and with Eric Black brought across from Birmingham City assuming the role of assistant manager, Barlow was appointed to the position of first-team coach.

=== Sheffield United ===
In June 2011, Barlow returned to his first club Sheffield United to become assistant manager, working under Danny Wilson. The pair guided the Blades to the League One play-off final in their first season in charge, only to see their side beaten by Huddersfield Town on penalties. United again challenged for promotion the following season, but a poor run of results after Christmas saw Barlow and Wilson sacked in April 2013.

== Honours ==
- League One Manager of the Month: March 2006
