= Ian McParland =

Scottish footballer and manager

Personal information
- Full name: Ian John McParland
- Date of birth: 4 October 1961 (age 65)
- Place of birth: Edinburgh, Scotland
- Height: 5 ft 8 in (1.73 m)
- Position: Striker

Youth career
- Sunderland

Senior career*
Years	Team	Apps	(Gls)
1979–1980	Ormiston Primrose		
1980–1989	Notts County	221	(69)
1989–1991	Hull City	47	(7)
1991	→ Walsall (loan)	11	(6)
1991–1992	Dunfermline Athletic	16	(2)
1992	Lincoln City	4	(0)
1992	→ Sliema Wanderers (loan)	1	(1)
1992–1993	Northampton Town	11	(3)
1993–1994	Instant-Dict		(18)
1994–1995	Eastern AA		
1995	Hamilton Academical	1	(0)
1995	Kettering Town	3	(0)
1995–1996	Cliftonville	6	(1)
1996	Dagenham & Redbridge	1	(0)
1996–1997	Berwick Rangers	9	(1)
Total		320	(88)

Managerial career
- 2006: Nottingham Forest (joint caretaker)
- 2007–2009: Notts County
- 2009–2011: Ipswich Town (assistant manager)
- 2011: Ipswich Town (caretaker)
- 2011: Swindon Town (assistant manager)
- 2013–2014: Nottingham Forest (youth coach)
- 2015: Sogndal (assistant manager)
- * Club domestic league appearances and goals

Ian John McParland (born 4 October 1961) is a Scottish former professional football player and manager. He played professionally as a striker with a number of teams and he is most known for his eight-year spell with Notts County, a club he later managed. He now features as a pundit on weekly football talk show 'Team Talk' on Notts TV.

== Playing career ==
McParland grew up in Tranent, East Lothian and after leaving an apprenticeship with Sunderland due to homesickness worked for two years in the Lothian coal mining industry whilst playing for Ormiston Primrose. McParland was with Notts County from 1980 to 1988, then had spells at Hull City, Walsall, Dunfermline Athletic, Lincoln City, Northampton Town, Instant-Dict (Hong Kong), Eastern AA (Hong Kong), Hamilton Academical and Berwick Rangers.

== Coaching and management ==
=== Nottingham Forest ===
McParland eventually went to Nottingham Forest as a coach. He was with Forest for over 10 years and was the reserve team coach for most of that time. When Gary Megson left the club in February 2006, he was put in temporary charge with Frank Barlow in a joint first team management role.

He and Barlow were named Managers of the Month for March 2006, when they went 10 games unbeaten, with 6 straight wins, including a 7–1 victory over Swindon Town at the City Ground. McParland just missed out on equalling a club record of 7 straight wins when Forest fell to a 3–2 defeat at the hands of Hartlepool United. Despite Forest narrowly missing out on the League One playoffs, McParland was still the favourite to land the Forest job (with Barlow) on a permanent basis. After Colin Calderwood was named the permanent successor to Megson, McParland and Barlow became coaches for the Forest first team.

=== Notts County ===
He was announced as the new Notts County manager in October 2007. McParland enjoyed a two-year spell in charge and, despite the appointment of Sven-Göran Eriksson as Director of Football, the club decided to retain his services. McParland was sacked on 12 October 2009, however, with the club in fifth place in League Two.

=== Ipswich Town ===
He joined Ipswich as part of Roy Keane's coaching staff on 27 November 2009. On 7 January 2011 he took over as caretaker manager for the departed Keane, and in his first game suffered a 7–0 defeat to Premier League side Chelsea. His second and final game in charge was the home leg of the League Cup semi-final against Arsenal on 12 January 2011, which Ipswich won 1–0. He was replaced permanently by Paul Jewell on 13 January 2011.

=== Swindon Town ===
McParland joined Swindon Town on 3 March 2011 as assistant to Paul Hart who had taken over the manager's role. He left the club in April 2011 following relegation to League Two.

=== Return to Forest ===
On 28 February 2013, McParland was appointed the under-21 coach at former club Nottingham Forest, returning to the club after an absence of over five years. He was relieved of his position after Billy Davies was fired from Nottingham Forest. In August 2014 he was contacted by Norwegian club Sogndal to become assistant manager under former Leeds player Eirik Bakke. McParland assumed the position ahead of the 2015 1. divisjon campaign, but missed his family, resigned after only three months and returned to England.

== Managerial statistics ==
Team	Nat	From	To	Record				
Team	Nat	From	To	G	W	D	L	Win %
Nottingham Forest	(England)	17 Feb 2006	30 May 2006	13	8	4	1	61.50
Notts County	(England)	18 October 2007	12 October 2009	103	28	31	44	27.18
Ipswich Town	(England)	7 January 2011	12 January 2011	2	1	0	1	50.00

== Honours ==
Player

Individual

- PFA Team of the Year: 1986–87 Third Division, 1987–88 Third Division

Manager

Individual

- League One Manager of the Month: March 2006
