= 2026: A Virtual Insanity =

- It's Always Sunny in Philadelphia episode
- Episode no.: Season 18; Episode 4
- Directed by: Heath Cullens
- Written by: Rob Rosell; Vanessa McGee
- Cinematography by: John Tanzer
- Editing by: Scott Draper
- Production code: XIP18004
- Original air date: August 31, 2026
- Running time: 23 minutes

Guest appearances
- David Hornsby as Cricket

Episode chronology
← Previous "The Gang Gets Tested"	Next → "The Gang Goes to the Ren Faire"
- It's Always Sunny in Philadelphia season 18

"2026: A Virtual Insanity" is the fourth episode of the eighteenth season of the American sitcom television series It's Always Sunny in Philadelphia. It is the 182nd overall episode of the series and was written by executive producers Rob Rosell and Vanessa McGee, and directed by co-executive producer Heath Cullens. It originally aired on FX and FXX on August 31, 2026.

The series follows "The Gang", a group of five misfit friends: twins Dennis and Deandra "(Sweet) Dee" Reynolds, their friends Charlie Kelly and Ronald "Mac" McDonald, and Frank Reynolds, Dennis's and Dee's legal father. The Gang runs the fictional Paddy's Pub, an unsuccessful Irish bar in South Philadelphia. In the episode, the gang is forced to interact with the homeless population of Philadelphia after their RV runs out of gas.

According to Nielsen Media Research, the episode was seen by an estimated 0.29 million viewers and gained a 0.07 ratings share among adults aged 18–49. The episode received mixed reviews from critics, who were unconvinced by the episode's tone and storylines.

== Plot ==
The Gang goes on an RV on their way to a Jamiroquai concert, even though Dennis has no clue where they currently are. The RV runs out of gas, and they realize they are stuck in an area with many homeless people. Frank, scared of what they could do to him, refuses to leave the RV and locks himself with a gun.

Mac and Dee leave to get gas from a nearby station, but Mac is robbed by a homeless man. As they try to retrieve gas, Dee realizes the drink she was taking is actually urine from a homeless man. Charlie and Dennis leave to find resources, and encounter Cricket. They convince him to exchange his CD player for tinfoil in their RV, although Frank accidentally shoots Cricket in the leg. In the confusion, Cricket locks himself in the RV.

Charlie and Dennis find Mac in a compound with other people, while Dee started using fentanyl. While Dennis claims homeless people live better than they do, Frank uses a cellphone to call a Tesla Autopilot car to get them to the concert. They happily leave, forgetting about the homeless.

== Production ==
=== Development ===
In August 2026, FX reported that the fourth episode of the eighteenth season would be titled "2026: A Virtual Insanity", and was to be written by executive producers Rob Rosell and Vanessa McGee, and directed by co-executive producer Heath Cullens. This marked Rosell's 28th writing credit, McGee's 1st writing credit, and Cullens' 16th directing credit.

== Reception ==
=== Viewers ===
In its original American broadcast, "2026: A Virtual Insanity" was seen by an estimated 0.16 million household viewers and gained a 0.04 ratings share among adults aged 18–49 in FX, and 0.13 million household viewers and gained a 0.03 ratings share among adults aged 18–49 in FXX. Combined, the episode was seen by an estimated 0.29 million household viewers and a 0.07 ratings share among adults aged 18–49. This means that 0.07 percent of all households with televisions watched the episode. This was a 20% increase in viewership from the previous episode, which was watched by an estimated 0.24 million household viewers with a 0.10 in the 18–49 demographics.

=== Critical reviews ===
"2026: A Virtual Insanity" earned mixed reviews from critics. Grant Hermanns of Screen Rant criticized Cricket's addition in the episode, writing "After season 17 saw him leaning into bizarre cultural stereotypes in living on the street, season 18 not only continues this trend, but pretty much only brings him around to make a buck off of The Gang as they need his help with whatever scheme they're up to. His destitute lifestyle no longer feels shocking to the point of humor, but also just generally underwhelming."

Jerrica Tisdale of Telltale TV gave the episode a 3.3 star rating out of 5 and wrote, "Overall, “A Virtual Insanity” wasn't a bad episode, but Season 18 has already set a high standard, so it fell a little short. However, we respect and appreciate the show's attempts to tackle such a complex issue in a semi-insane way – the Sunny way." Sam Huang of TV Fanatic gave the episode a 2 star rating out of 5 and wrote, "“2026: A Virtual Insanity” tries to reflect how our society's collective ignorance and inability to help out homeless people, but its inconsistent tone and wobbly humor fail to make the episode memorable. It's honestly a little disappointing to see a show that once stood out for its sharp satire fall so flat, and I hope this is just an off-episode for this season."
