= Steve Cotterill =

English football manager (born 1964)

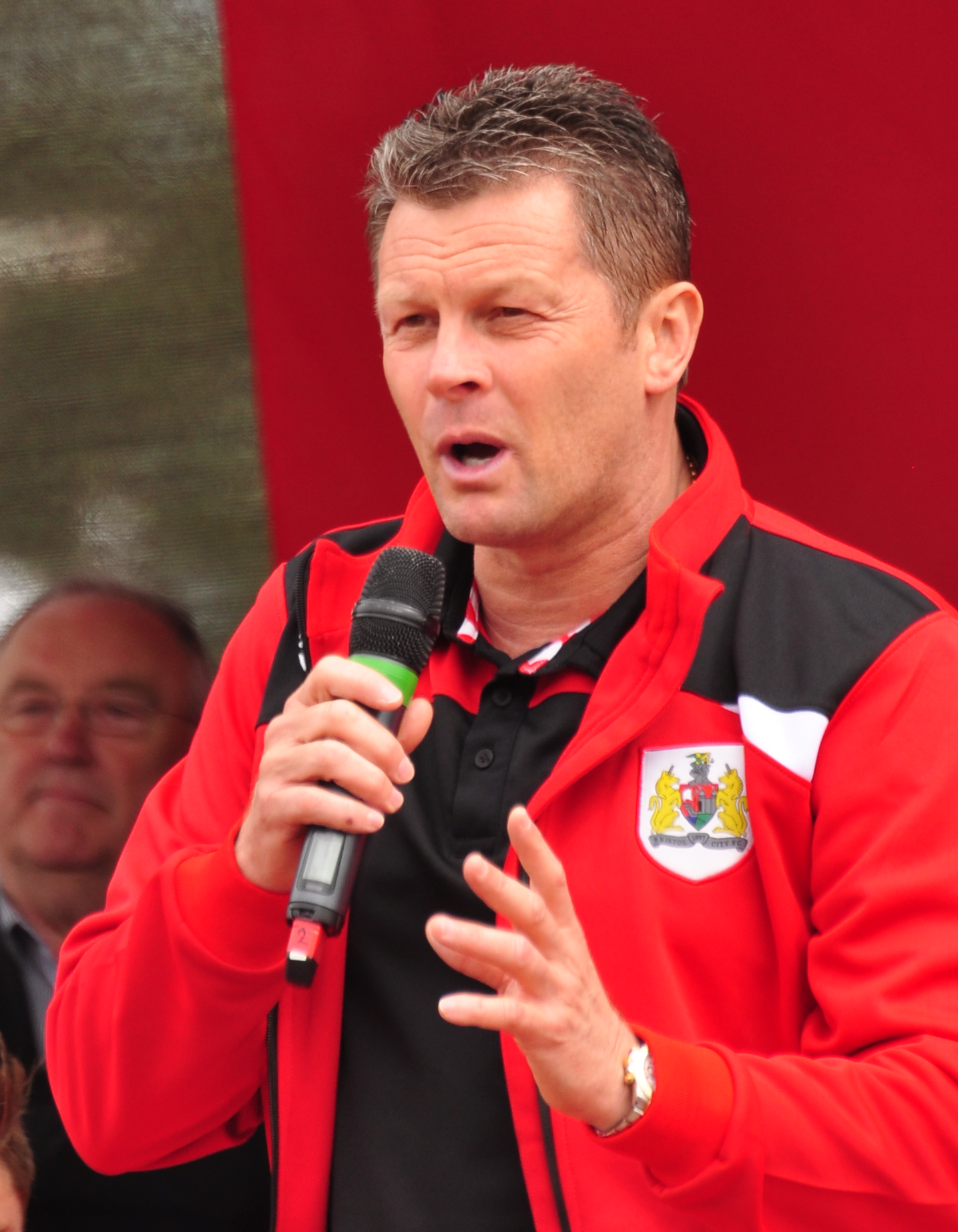
- Cotterill as manager of Bristol City in 2015

Personal information
- Full name: Stephen John Cotterill
- Date of birth: 20 July 1964 (age 62)
- Place of birth: Cheltenham, England
- Position: Striker

Team information
- Current team: Cheltenham Town (manager)

Youth career
- Cheltenham Town

Senior career*
Years	Team	Apps	(Gls)
1986–1987	Cheltenham Town	9	(1)
1987–1989	Burton Albion	74	(44)
1989–1993	Wimbledon	24	(7)
1992	→ Brighton & Hove Albion (loan)	11	(4)
1993–1996	Bournemouth	55	(18)
Total		164	(73)

Managerial career
- 1996: Sligo Rovers
- 1997–2002: Cheltenham Town
- 2002: Stoke City
- 2004–2007: Burnley
- 2010: Notts County
- 2010–2011: Portsmouth
- 2011–2012: Nottingham Forest
- 2013–2016: Bristol City
- 2017–2018: Birmingham City
- 2020–2023: Shrewsbury Town
- 2024–2025: Forest Green Rovers
- 2025–: Cheltenham Town
- * Club domestic league appearances and goals

Stephen John Cotterill (born 20 July 1964) is an English football manager and former player. He is the manager of EFL League Two club Cheltenham Town.

Cotterill, a striker, had a nine-year career as a footballer playing for Burton Albion, Wimbledon, Brighton & Hove Albion and Bournemouth before deciding to take up football management. He began with Irish side Sligo Rovers and after a year he returned to England and took over at his home town club, Cheltenham Town. He did well at Whaddon Road guiding the club from the sixth tier to the third in five years. His success at Cheltenham led to Stoke City appointing him as their manager prior to the 2002–03 season.

After 13 games as manager, he left to become assistant manager to Howard Wilkinson at Sunderland only to be dismissed from this post with Wilkinson in March 2003 after 27 games in the role. He joined Burnley in June 2004. After three years at Turf Moor he moved on to have a short spell at Notts County in 2010 and spent a season-and-a-half at cash-strapped Portsmouth. In October 2011 he was appointed manager at Nottingham Forest guiding the club out of a relegation battle. He was dismissed by Forest in July 2012 after the club was taken over by the Al-Hasawi family. In January 2013, he joined Queens Park Rangers' coaching staff remaining until the end of the 2012–13 season. Cotterill was appointed manager of Bristol City in December 2013, taking them to the Championship before being dismissed in January 2016. He was manager of Championship club Birmingham City from September 2017 to March 2018.

== Playing career ==
Cotterill was born in Cheltenham, Gloucestershire. He started his playing career in non-League football as a forward who could play centrally or in wide positions, playing semi-professionally at clubs like Cheltenham Town, Alvechurch and Burton Albion. In 1989, he moved into professional football when signing for Wimbledon in the First Division. He made 25 appearances in four years at Wimbledon and went out on loan to Brighton & Hove Albion to recapture his fitness following a serious cruciate knee-ligament injury. Cotterill signed for Bournemouth in the summer of 1993 for the fee of £120,000. He was out of contract and this fee was set by the then Transfer Tribunal. In three years at Bournemouth he got his career back in good shape scoring 18 goals in 55 league starts for the club. While at the club he picked up three player of the season awards but had to finish his career in 1996 after another bad knee injury from which he was unable to fully recover.

== Coaching career ==
=== Sligo Rovers ===
Following on from Lawrie Sanchez, Sligo Rovers appointed Cotterill for the 1996 season. He led the club to third place in the Premier Division of the League of Ireland and his side also reached the League of Ireland Cup final, where they lost on penalties to Shelbourne. Cotterill also led them into the 1996 UEFA Intertoto Cup, playing against teams such as Nantes where they earned a 3–3 draw and another creditable 0–0 draw against Dutch team, Heerenveen.

=== Cheltenham Town ===
Cotterill joined Cheltenham when they were still a non-league club and he built up a successful side which won promotion from the Southern Football League Premier Division to the Football Conference in his first full year at the club. He won the FA Trophy in 1998, beating Southport 1–0 in the final, and Cheltenham finished second in the Conference the same year, their first season in that league. Cheltenham won the Conference and with it promotion to the Football League the following year. His first two seasons in the Third Division saw them finish in the top half. In 2001–02, the club reached the fifth round of the FA Cup for the first time in its history, ended only by a 1–0 away defeat to West Bromwich Albion and including the defeat of Cotterill's future club Burnley. He twice won the prestigious award of Manager of the Year during his tenure. Cotterill took Cheltenham into the Second Division that season, following a play-off victory over Rushden & Diamonds at the Millennium Stadium in Cardiff. He was awarded his UEFA Pro Licence in 2002.

=== Stoke City ===
Cotterill left Cheltenham to join First Division side Stoke City in the summer of 2002. His only major summer signing was that of striker Chris Greenacre from Mansfield Town. Stoke began the 2002–03 season with a 0–0 draw at Sheffield Wednesday and their first win came on 17 August against Bradford City. This was followed by a 3–4 defeat by Preston North End and narrow losses to Derby County and Burnley. The side then went five matches unbeaten before Cotterill shocked the club on 10 October by handing in his resignation after just 13 games to become assistant manager to Howard Wilkinson at Sunderland.

=== Sunderland ===
As Howard Wilkinson's assistant, they were tasked with keeping Sunderland in the Premiership. However, Sunderland recorded just two league victories under the new management team and both Wilkinson and Cotterill were dismissed after just 27 games in charge.

In February 2004, struggling Premiership outfit Leicester City appointed Coterill as coach by manager Micky Adams.

=== Burnley ===
In the summer of 2004, a decision by Burnley not to renew the contract of their manager, Stan Ternent, led to Cotterill being named as the new manager of the club. In his first season at the club they reached the third round of the Football League Cup, beating Aston Villa 3–1 on the way. They also reached the fifth round of the FA Cup, beating Premier League side Liverpool 1–0 in the third round. After losing striker and captain Robbie Blake and young midfielder Richard Chaplow they finished 13th in the Championship. In 2005–06 he led Burnley to a 17th-place finish, again having to sell his star striker, the club's leading goal scorer Ade Akinbiyi to Sheffield United for £1.75 million.

The 2006–07 season began well, with a series of wins. Cotterill also won the Championship Manager of the Month for October 2006. However Burnley were dealt a blow in November when leading goalscorer Andy Gray was sidelined until February. Akinbiyi was re-signed in the January transfer window, but the striker took nine games to score a goal. Cotterill eventually left the club on 8 November 2007 by mutual consent, after earning the title of longest serving manager in the league with three years seven months service. He left the club in 15th place in the league having won just one game in ten.

In August 2008, Steve Cotterill was offered the chance to become the head coach and technical director of USL First Division Minnesota Thunder after Amos Magee stepped down. Cotterill was offered a temporary seven-week contract with a view to a longer deal when the season ended. As it would take two weeks to obtain a work permit, leaving only five weeks with Minnesota, Cotterill decided to turn this opportunity down.

=== Notts County ===
On 23 February 2010, it was announced that Cotterill would be manager of Notts County until the end of the season. On 3 April 2010, Cotterill was named March Football League Two Manager of the Month for six wins and two draws in the month. Cotterill also received this accolade for April 2010. On 27 April 2010, Notts County were crowned champions of League Two after defeating Darlington 5–0.

After the 2009–10 season, Cotterill was linked with the vacant Coventry City post but had said that Coventry did not try to contact him. Two weeks later Cotterill publicly turned down the job. On 25 May, another Championship club, Portsmouth confirmed interest in the Notts County boss.

On 27 May 2010, Notts County announced that Cotterill had left after failing to commit his future to the club. Notts County chairman, Ray Trew said of Cotterill: "The job that Steve did for us here will live long in the memory of all Notts County fans and, as is a mark of all great managers, he leaves the club in a much better position than when he arrived."

=== Portsmouth ===
Cotterill was appointed as manager of Portsmouth on 18 June 2010, with the club in financial difficulty. Cotterill played a key role in stabilising Portsmouth through some turbulent times which saw the club nearly in liquidation. His performance as manager with Portsmouth saw him linked with the manager's job at other clubs, including that at Birmingham City.

In his second full season and under new ownership, Portsmouth were expected to improve on the previous season's performance. However, the team won just two of their first 10 league matches in the Championship. On 4 October 2011, the joint owner of Portsmouth, Roman Dubov backed him saying "We support him and believe in him – his talent, his attitude and his work".

It later became public knowledge that Nottingham Forest were interested in hiring Cotterill as their new manager after Steve McClaren resigned from his post on 2 October 2011 after 111 days in charge. This followed the club's poor start to the season and allegations by McClaren of broken promises by the Nottingham Forest board regarding the signing of loan players. Cotterill was granted permission to speak with Nottingham Forest on 14 October 2011 after compensation was agreed with Portsmouth.

=== Nottingham Forest ===
Cotterill was appointed as manager on 14 October 2011 on a three-and-a-half-year deal. He won four of his first six games in charge. Cotterill began his Forest reign with a 2–0 win over Middlesbrough and a 2–1 win at Blackpool. The turnaround was short-lived though as a run of seven games without a goal, during which Forest suffered six defeats leaving them in the bottom three at the turn of the year. Forest ended that sequence with a 3–1 win at Ipswich Town on 2 January 2012 and followed that with a 0–0 draw at home to Leicester City in the third round of the FA Cup. A 4–0 defeat in the replay and two more league defeats, as part of six consecutive home league defeats, meant by the end of January 2012 Forest were 23rd in the league. From mid February, Forest's fortunes improved, starting with a 2–0 win over fellow relegation candidates Coventry City. This culminated in Forest finishing 19th and ten points clear of relegation. Cotterill left the club on 12 July 2012 following the take-over of the club by the Al-Hasawi family, despite Fawaz Al-Hasawi having previously favoured Cotterill's retention and despite Cotterill's own wish to remain.

In January 2013 he joined Queens Park Rangers to be part of Harry Redknapp's coaching staff on a short-term basis. Cotterill was invited by Redknapp to coach again in the 2013–14 season but declined the offer and left the club.

=== Bristol City ===
On 3 December 2013, Cotterill was appointed manager of League One club Bristol City on a three-and-a-half-year contract. In his first season in charge, Cotterill guided Bristol City to 12th place in League One. In his second season in charge, the 2014–15 season, City won the Football League Trophy, for a record third time. 10 points clear at the top of League One and 37 points ahead of their rivals, City beat Walsall 2–0 at Wembley on 22 March 2015. Cotterill guided Bristol City to promotion from League One in the 2014–15 season with a club record of 99 points. Club chairman Keith Dawe said that the season's success "will live in the memory for a long time". Their form since the start of the season under Cotterill was described as "imperious" and promotion was gained on 14 April 2015 after a 0–6 away win at Bradford City.

On 18 April 2015, Bristol City were crowned League One champions following a 0–0 draw at home to Coventry City. This made them the first club to win both the Football League Trophy and League One in the same season since Birmingham City in 1995. It was Bristol City's first league title win for 60 years since their win in the 1954–55 Division Three South. Following Bristol City's promotion to the Championship, Cotterill was named LMA League One Manager of the Year, having already earned Sky Bet League One Manager of the Month in September 2014 and March 2015.

Despite their successes in League One, the squad struggled in the Championship after a series of rejected transfers following a lack of investment. Only 256 days after Cotterill had led them back to the Championship, Cotterill was dismissed by Keith Dawe on 14 January 2016, despite his earlier favourable appraisal of Cotterill: "I believe Steve Cotterill has the capacity to be a Premier League manager". Other senior figures at the club were also supportive of Cotterill prior to his dismissal, such as club owner Steve Lansdown: "He is the man at the helm to take us forward".

=== Birmingham City ===
With three matches left of the 2016–17 season, Cotterill joined Birmingham City as first-team coach under new manager Harry Redknapp. He played his part in preparing the team to gain the two wins needed to avoid relegation to League One, but decided against remaining with the club as assistant manager for 2017–18. After Redknapp's dismissal in September 2017, Cotterill agreed a 2½-year contract as Birmingham manager, to take effect on 2 October. After five months in post, during which the team remained in and around the relegation zone, and after a fifth successive league defeat – performance affected at least in part by a series of injuries and boardroom politics – Cotterill was dismissed on 3 March 2018.

=== Shrewsbury Town ===
On 27 November 2020, Cotterill was announced as manager of League One club Shrewsbury Town, just two days after the departure of Sam Ricketts. He took charge of his first game two days later, a 1–0 win at home to National League South side Oxford City in the second round of the FA Cup thanks to an extra time winner from Daniel Udoh. He took charge of his first league game on 2 December, a 2–2 draw at home to Accrington Stanley, was followed by a 1–0 win away at table-toppers Hull City and wins by the same score at second-place Lincoln City and third-place Doncaster Rovers on 22 December. With this, he completed a hat-trick of away wins against top sides in the division and nine points from a possible nine.

On 19 January 2021, Cotterill's Shrewsbury side travelled to Premier League side Southampton for an FA Cup third round tie. However, assistant manager Aaron Wilbraham took charge as stand-in manager as Cotterill had been in intensive care after suffering from COVID-19. The Shrews lost 2–0. He was treated in hospital for COVID-19 for 33 days before being released on 16 February. On 1 March 2021, Cotterill was re-admitted to hospital after suffering from COVID-pneumonia. On 15 March 2021, Cotterill was discharged for hospital for a second time, where he continued his recovery at home.

On 1 June 2023, Cotterill was reported to be set to resign as Shrewsbury manager, a move confirmed on 6 June 2023.

=== Forest Green Rovers ===
On 25 January 2024, Cotterill was announced as the new manager of League Two club Forest Green Rovers who had not won in their previous 12 matches and were six points from safety at the bottom of the league. Cotterill could not prevent relegation, which was confirmed with two matches remaining. After failing to gain promotion from the National League, Forest Green Rovers sacked Cotterill in June 2025.

=== Return to Cheltenham Town ===
On 30 September 2025, Cotterill returned to League Two club Cheltenham Town on a three-year contract. He had an immediate effect following his return, leading the club to ten points from his first four matches, including a win over league leaders Walsall, being named Manager of the Month for October.

== Personal life ==
Cotterill was 11 when his father died. His mother died when she was 56 and he was 38. He then adopted a strict fitness regime because "all my family had gone and I made a decision that I am hanging around. I want to live to a grand old age". In 2019, he had surgery to replace a ruptured disc in his neck.

During 2021, Cotterill was twice admitted to Bristol Royal Infirmary with severe COVID-19 symptoms compounded by emphysema and a punctured lung. In an interview with the BBC he described being '...frightened to go to sleep in case I didn't wake up'.

== Career statistics ==
=== As a player ===
Appearances and goals by club, season and competition
Club	Season	League			FA Cup		League Cup		Other^{[A]}		Total	
Club	Season	Division	Apps	Goals	Apps	Goals	Apps	Goals	Apps	Goals	Apps	Goals
Wimbledon	1988–89	First Division	4	1	0	0	0	0	0	0	4	1
Wimbledon	1989–90	First Division	2	1	0	0	1	0	2	0	5	1
Wimbledon	1990–91	First Division	4	1	0	0	1	0	0	0	5	1
Wimbledon	1991–92	First Division	0	0	0	0	0	0	0	0	0	0
Wimbledon	1992–93	Premier League	7	3	3	1	0	0	0	0	10	4
Wimbledon	Total		17	6	3	1	2	0	2	0	24	7
Brighton & Hove Albion (loan)	1992–93	Second Division	11	4	0	0	0	0	0	0	11	4
Bournemouth	1993–94	Second Division	37	14	3	1	4	0	1	0	45	15
Bournemouth	1994–95	Second Division	8	1	0	0	2	2	0	0	10	3
Bournemouth	Total		45	15	3	1	6	2	1	0	55	18
Career total			73	25	6	2	8	2	3	0	90	29

A. The "Other" column constitutes appearances and goals in the Full Members' Cup and the Football League Trophy.

== Managerial statistics ==
As of match played 21 November 2026

Managerial record by team and tenure
Team	From	To	Record					Ref.
Team	From	To	P	W	D	L	Win %	Ref.
Sligo Rovers	1 July 1995	28 September 1996	55	26	15	14	47.3	
Cheltenham Town	1 February 1997	27 May 2002	303	147	79	77	48.5	
Stoke City	27 May 2002	10 October 2002	13	3	5	5	23.1	
Burnley	3 June 2004	8 November 2007	169	55	48	66	32.5	
Notts County	23 February 2010	27 May 2010	18	14	3	1	77.8	
Portsmouth	18 June 2010	14 October 2011	61	18	17	26	29.5	
Nottingham Forest	14 October 2011	12 July 2012	37	12	7	18	32.4	
Bristol City	3 December 2013	14 January 2016	116	53	35	28	45.7	
Birmingham City	2 October 2017	3 March 2018	27	7	5	15	25.9	
Shrewsbury Town	27 November 2020	6 June 2023	144	48	32	64	33.3	
Forest Green Rovers	25 January 2024	26 June 2025	75	33	20	22	44.0	
Cheltenham Town	30 September 2025	Present	62	22	15	25	35.5	
Total			1,080	439	280	361	40.6	

== Honours ==
Cheltenham Town

- Football League Third Division play-offs: 2002
- Football Conference: 1998–99
- FA Trophy: 1997–98

Notts County

- Football League Two: 2009–10

Bristol City

- Football League One: 2014–15
- Football League Trophy: 2014–15

Individual

- Football League Championship Manager of the Month: October 2006
- Football / EFL League One Manager of the Month: September 2014, March 2015 December 2020
- Football League One Manager of the Year: 2014–15
- Football / EFL League Two Manager of the Month: March 2010, April 2010, October 2025
- Football Conference Manager of the Year: 1997–98,1998–99
- Honorary Fellowship (University of Gloucestershire): 2000
- Manager Special Achievement of the Year Award: 2014–15

== See also ==
- List of football managers with the most matches
