= Fred Walker (footballer, born 1878) =

English footballer

Personal information
- Full name: Frederick Charles Walker
- Date of birth: 25 March 1878
- Place of birth: Longbenton, Newcastle upon Tyne, England
- Date of death: 28 October 1940 (aged 62)
- Place of death: Leeds, England
- Position: Defender

Senior career*
Years	Team	Apps	(Gls)
1905–1907	Leeds City	26	(0)
1908–1909	Huddersfield Town	24	(0)

Managerial career
- 1908–1910: Huddersfield Town
- 1911–1913: 1. FC Nürnberg
- * Club domestic league appearances and goals

Frederick Charles Walker (25 March 1878 – 28 October 1940) was a professional footballer and later manager. He played for Hebburn Argyle, Barrow, Leeds City and Huddersfield Town. He was also first manager for Huddersfield Town and to date, their only player-manager.

Walker's football career began in the late 19th century, initially playing local football in the North East before signing for Hebburn Argyle. By the early 1900s, he'd signed for Barrow in the Lancashire Combination. In 1905, Leeds City secured his services shortly after they'd been elected to The Football League.

== Playing career ==
Walker transferred to Hebburn Argyle around 1897, when he was just 19 years old and while he was at the club he became the captain of the side. He captained the team for two seasons in the National Alliance. While he was at the club, Walker combined his footballing duties with his day job as a brass founder.

Walker remained at Argyle into the 20th century, before he signed for Barrow, playing for them by 1903, captaining the side for two seasons.

His time at Barrow came to an end when Leeds City secured his services in May 1905 upon their election to the Football League. He thus became one of the club's first professional players. Although he initially played in the reserves, Walker broke into the first team in September 1905, replacing the out of form Harry Stringfellow. He spent the rest of the season battling it out with Jack Morris, vying for the centre-half position. In his first season, Walker played 18 league games and another three in the F.A. Cup, often moonlighting in the unfamiliar positions of right-back, right-half and left-half.

At the start of the 1906–07 season, Walker briefly replaced injured captain John George before losing his place to Jimmy Kennedy, ultimately finding his opportunities limited thereafter. An unfortunate illness left him unable to play throughout 1907-08, though he did receive offers from Southern League clubs, rejecting them on medical advice.

== Managerial career ==
=== Huddersfield Town ===
In 1908, Walker applied for the player-manager role at the newly formed Huddersfield Town. He was deemed the best candidate amongst the applicants and was given the job in the summer of 1908, Walker has the distinction of being Town's first ever manager as well as their first ever captain. He captained the side in their first ever game in September 1908 and was a mainstay in the side for those early months of the 1908–09 season. Though his appearances became more sporadic as the season progressed.

For the 1909–10 season, Town switched to the Midland League and Walker remained in charge of the team. He opted to remain in the dugout at the start of that season, and it wasn't until October 1909 that he made his first appearance of the season. He only donned the jersey in an emergency, as Charles Randall was suffering from illness. Walker played five games at centre-half before his playing career was ended after he suffered internal injuries in an FA Cup tie with South Kirkby Colliery in November. Walker would never play again and after spending over a week in hospital, he returned to the dugout and concentrated on managing from then on.

Walker has the distinction of being Huddersfield's first ever Football League manager, taking charge of their first ever games at that level. He remained in charge of the club until November 1910, when he was replaced by Dick Pudan. He initially remained at the club, assisting Pudan, but less than a month later he severed all ties with the club.
