= Danny Cowley =

English footballer & manager (born 1978)

Personal information
- Full name: Daniel Stephen Cowley
- Date of birth: 22 October 1978 (age 48)
- Place of birth: Havering, Greater London, England
- Position: Midfielder

Team information
- Current team: Colchester United (head coach)

Youth career
- Gidea Park Rangers
- Wimbledon

Senior career*
Years	Team	Apps	(Gls)
	Dagenham & Redbridge	0	(0)
- Purfleet
- Barking
–2004	Harlow Town		
2004–2005	Boreham Wood		
2004–2005	→ Romford (loan)	18	(1)
2005–2007	Hornchurch		
2007	Brentwood Town		
2007	Concord Rangers		

Managerial career
- 2008–2015: Concord Rangers
- 2015–2016: Braintree Town
- 2016–2019: Lincoln City
- 2019–2020: Huddersfield Town
- 2021–2023: Portsmouth
- 2024–: Colchester United
- * Club domestic league appearances and goals

Daniel Stephen Cowley (born 22 October 1978) is an English professional football coach who is head coach of Colchester United.

As a player he played at semi-professional level as a midfielder, although he was in the academy at Premier League club Wimbledon. He played for Dagenham & Redbridge, Purfleet, Barking, Harlow Town, Boreham Wood, Romford, Hornchurch, Brentwood Town and Concord Rangers.

He became manager of Concord Rangers in 2008 before moving on to Braintree Town. In his single season with Braintree he took them to the National League play-off semifinals where they were defeated by Grimsby Town. He then guided Lincoln City to the National League title and the quarter finals of the FA Cup the following season. He has since gone on to manage in the EFL Championship with Huddersfield Town and more recently Portsmouth.

== Early life ==
Cowley was born in Havering, Greater London. He was involved with the youth set-up with Wimbledon from the under-10s to under-16s but was not offered a scholarship having suffered from Osgood–Schlatter disease.

== Playing career ==
Playing as a midfielder he also spent time with non-League clubs, including Barking, Romford, AFC Hornchurch and Brentwood Town, before his career was ended by injury in 2007. Shortly after that, he was offered the assistant manager's job at Concord Rangers.

== Managerial career ==
=== Concord Rangers ===
When he was asked to join Danny Scopes management team) Concord Rangers (first as assistant and then as joint manager with Danny Scopes), the club was playing in the Essex Senior Football League, in front of crowds of around 50 people. In their first season the club was promoted to the Isthmian League Division One North, and narrowly missed out on a second successive promotion the following year, before being promoted a year later. After two seasons of consolidation, Scopes and Cowley won their third promotion with the club, this time to the National League South. In their last season in charge, Concord reached the first round proper of the FA Cup, while narrowly missing out on a play-off spot.

=== Braintree Town ===
On 30 April 2015, Cowley became manager of Braintree Town. That season Braintree secured their highest-ever finish of third place in the National League, and qualified for the play-offs. In the play-off semi-finals, they won the first leg at Grimsby Town, defeating them 1–0, before losing the second leg 2–0 at home, failing to qualify for the final as his side lost 2–1 on aggregate.

=== Lincoln City ===
After just one season in charge of Braintree Town, Cowley moved on again, this time to Lincoln City on 13 May 2016. During Cowley's first season in charge of Lincoln, he oversaw the club's promotion back to the Football League – doing so by winning the National League title with two games to spare.

In the same season Lincoln became the first non-league club to reach the quarter-final of the FA Cup in over a century, knocking out Championship sides Ipswich Town and Brighton & Hove Albion, followed by Premier League side Burnley, in the process. Lincoln eventually lost 5–0 to Arsenal in the quarter-finals. In April 2018, with their contracts due to end in 2021, Cowley and his brother signed contract extensions lasting until 2022. On 8 April 2018, he led his team to the EFL Trophy final against Shrewsbury Town at Wembley Stadium which they won 1–0 owing to a goal by Elliott Whitehouse. It was Lincoln's first ever game at Wembley.

In Lincoln's first season back in the league (2017–18) they finished the season seventh in League Two qualifying for the play-offs, where they were soundly beaten by Exeter City in the semi-final.

The following season, Cowley guided Lincoln to promotion to League One, returning to the third tier of English football for the first time since 1999. On 22 April 2019, Cowley led Lincoln as champions to League One after a 0–0 draw at home to Tranmere Rovers. It was Lincoln's first title win in the Football League since 1983.

Lincoln's first year back in League One since 1999 started really well, with the Imps winning each of their first three league games, not conceding a goal, and sitting top of the table. This run also included a win at Huddersfield Town in the League Cup, a first-ever win for the Imps at that stadium. Despite two defeats following that run, the Imps ended August with a 2–0 win at home against Fleetwood Town. A convincing 3–1 defeat at Wycombe Wanderers a week later turned out to by the final game managing Lincoln City for Danny as he left the club for Huddersfield Town, whom he had beaten with the Imps just a few weeks prior.

=== Huddersfield Town ===
On 9 September 2019, Cowley left Lincoln to become the new Huddersfield Town manager. He and his assistant Nicky signed three-year contracts. After a successful run of six games unbeaten throughout the month, Cowley won the EFL Championship Manager of the Month award for October 2019. On 17 July 2020, Huddersfield defeated promotion-seeking West Bromwich Albion to all but ensure the club's Championship survival. Despite this, Cowley was sacked two days later, with chairman Phil Hodgkinson outlining the need for a "different vision" going forward as the reason for relieving Cowley of the role.

=== Portsmouth ===
On 19 March 2021, Danny Cowley was appointed as head coach of Portsmouth on a contract until the end of the 2020–21 season, with his brother Nicky once again joining as his assistant. In his first game in charge at the club, Portsmouth would come from behind to beat Ipswich Town 2–1. On 11 May 2021, after overseeing 6 wins in 12 matches in charge, Cowley signed a new "long term" deal with the club. Cowley won the EFL League One Manager of the Month award for November 2021 after winning thirteen points from five matches. However, inconsistent form meant the club finished in tenth position, ten points short of the play-off positions.

Cowley started the 2022–23 season in style, winning the League One Manager of the Month award for August 2022 after picking up thirteen points from a possible fifteen that saw Portsmouth in early contention for an automatic promotion spot. This strong start to the season fell away and following a run of over two months without a league victory, Cowley was sacked on 2 January 2023, with his side sitting in 12th position.

=== Colchester United ===
On 4 January 2024, Cowley was appointed head coach of League Two club Colchester United.

Cowley's first game in charge of Colchester saw his team earn a 2–2 draw against Swindon, despite being 2–0 down in the first half. Cowley's first home game as Colchester manager ended 1–1 against Bradford. Cowley ended January unbeaten as Colchester manager when the U's won 1–0 at Morecambe - Cowley's third match as Colchester Manager. Under Cowley, The U's become a much stronger and harder team to beat, with Cowley being unbeaten in 6 of his 20 league matches. Within these 20 matches, the U's drew 10 of these. Back to back wins at Crawley Town (3-2) and Grimsby Town (2-0) put the U's in a strong position to avoid relegation. The U's confirmed their League Two status on the final day of the season with a 1–1 draw against Crewe.

Cowley was named EFL League Two Manager of the Month for March 2025 following five wins from seven matches, moving the U's into play-off contention.

Having missed out on the play-offs the previous campaign, Cowley's side started the 2025–26 season slowly before their form picked up in November 2025, a run of nine points from four matches seeing him named Manager of the Month.

== Personal life ==
Growing up, Cowley was a West Ham United supporter. During his spells as manager of Concord Rangers and Braintree Town, Cowley combined his management role with teaching Physical Education at FitzWimarc School in Rayleigh, Essex. Cowley has a brother, Nicky, who played alongside him at Romford and has been his assistant manager at Concord Rangers, Braintree Town, Lincoln City, Huddersfield Town, Portsmouth and Colchester United.

Cowley graduated from the University of Greenwich in 2002, obtaining a bachelor's degree in Physical Education.

Cowley lives in Essex with his wife and children George and Isabella. Isabella is a footballer who plays as a defender in Arsenal W.F.C.'s Academy and for the England under 17's

== Managerial statistics ==
As of match played 21 November 2026

Managerial record by team and tenure
Team	From	To	Record					Ref.
Team	From	To	P	W	D	L	Win %	Ref.
Concord Rangers	27 June 2008	30 April 2015	341	169	75	97	49.6	
Braintree Town	30 April 2015	13 May 2016	53	26	13	14	49.1	
Lincoln City	13 May 2016	9 September 2019	184	98	48	38	53.3	
Huddersfield Town	9 September 2019	19 July 2020	40	13	11	16	32.5	
Portsmouth	19 March 2021	2 January 2023	97	42	27	28	43.3	
Colchester United	4 January 2024	Present	146	48	51	47	32.9	
Total			861	396	225	240	46.0	

== Honours ==
=== As a manager ===
Lincoln City

- EFL League Two: 2018–19
- National League: 2016–17
- EFL Trophy: 2017–18

Individual

- EFL Championship Manager of the Month: October 2019
- EFL League One Manager of the Month: November 2021, August 2022
- EFL League Two Manager of the Month: December 2017, August 2018, March 2025 November 2025
- LMA League Two Manager of the Year: 2019
- National League Manager of the Month: October 2016
- National League Manager of the Season: 2016–17
