= Liam Manning =

English football coach and former player (born 1985)

Personal information
- Full name: Liam John Manning
- Date of birth: 20 October 1985 (age 41)
- Place of birth: Norwich, England
- Position: Midfielder

Youth career
- –1999: Bungay Town
- 1999–2002: Ipswich Town

Senior career*
Years	Team	Apps	(Gls)
2004–2005	Ipswich Town		
2005	Long Melford		
2005	Leiston		
2005	Woodbridge Town		
2005–2006	Selfoss		
2006–2008	Leiston	63	(5)
2008	Woodbridge Town		
2008	Wroxham		
2008–2009	Melton St Audrey		
2010	Ipswich Wanderers		

Managerial career
- 2020–2021: Lommel
- 2021–2022: Milton Keynes Dons
- 2023: Oxford United
- 2023–2025: Bristol City
- 2025: Norwich City
- 2026: Huddersfield Town
- * Club domestic league appearances and goals

Liam John Manning (born 20 October 1985) is an English football coach and most recently was manager of EFL League One club Huddersfield Town.

== Playing career ==
Manning played for the academy of his local side Norwich City before joining Ipswich Town in 2002, where he spent a year as a professional before being released in 2005. Following his release from Ipswich, Manning dropped into non-league, playing for Bishop's Stortford, Long Melford and Leiston, before enjoying a brief spell playing in Iceland for Selfoss.

Upon his return from Iceland, Manning re-signed for Leiston, playing for the club between 2006 and 2008. Manning later returned to Woodbridge, followed by spells with Wroxham, Melton St Audrey and Ipswich Wanderers, before retiring from football to concentrate on coaching.

== Management and coaching ==
=== Early coaching career ===
Liam Manning worked as an academy coach at Ipswich Town before joining Premier League side West Ham United in 2015 as head coach of the club's U23s.

In 2019, he left to join City Football Group, initially as director of coaching with Major League Soccer side New York City FC before later progressing to the role of academy director.

=== Lommel SK ===
Staying within City Football Group, in July 2020, Manning was named head coach of Belgian First Division B club Lommel SK, where he led the previously bottom of the table side to a third-placed finish at the end of the 2020–21 season.

=== Milton Keynes Dons ===
On 13 August 2021, Manning joined League One club Milton Keynes Dons. On 8 October 2021, after just eleven league games in charge, Manning was named EFL League One Manager of the Month for September 2021, a month in which he led the club to an unbeaten run of five league games achieving eleven points. He repeated the achievement four months later, being named League One Manager of the Month for January 2022, after a similarly successful period.

At the end of his first season, Manning had led the club to a third-place finish with 89 points and play-off qualification, having missed out on automatic promotion by a single point. The club however later failed to gain promotion via the play-offs, losing out to Wycombe Wanderers over two semi-final legs.

Following a poor start to the season that found his side in the relegation zone, Manning was dismissed on 11 December 2022, having accumulated just fifteen points from twenty matches.

=== Oxford United ===
On 11 March 2023, Manning was appointed head coach of League One side Oxford United. An impressive start to the following season for the club saw him lead his new club to four wins from five matches, and he was named League One Manager of the Month. Manning left the club in November 2023, after 29 games in charge with the club second in League One.

=== Bristol City ===
On 7 November 2023, Manning, together with his assistant Chris Hogg, departed Oxford United and joined EFL Championship club Bristol City as the head coach, signing a contract until June 2027. He was able to guide the club to a sixth place finish and Play-off qualification in the 2024–25 season, but were beaten 6–0 on aggregate by Sheffield United.

=== Norwich City ===
On 3 June 2025, Manning was appointed head coach of Norwich City, signing a four-year contract through to the summer of 2029.

He was dismissed on 8 November 2025 after a run of 3 draws and no wins from 11 matches, leaving the club 23rd in the league. His final game was a 1–2 loss at home to Leicester City, where Norwich conceded in stoppage time. Under his tenure, Norwich lost every home game.

=== Huddersfield Town ===
On 20 January 2026, Manning was appointed head coach of League One side Huddersfield Town. He took compassionate leave in March 2026, and on 11 May 2026, it was reported that Manning had left the club by mutual consent.

== Coaching style ==
Manning favours a high possession, high pressing style of football.

He has a reputation for developing young players, having spent much of his early coaching career working with the academy sides of West Ham United, Ipswich Town and New York City FC. Manning is credited as having contributed to the development of England international Declan Rice.

== Personal life ==
Manning took compassionate leave from Bristol City from 14 October 2024 for an indefinite period of time following the death of his newborn son Theo. He took further compassionate leave from Huddersfield in March 2026.

== Managerial statistics ==
As of match played 14 April 2026

Managerial record by team and tenure
Team	From	To	Record					Ref.
Team	From	To	P	W	D	L	Win %	Ref.
Lommel	12 August 2020	11 August 2021	30	14	4	12	46.67	
Milton Keynes Dons	13 August 2021	11 December 2022	83	40	15	28	48.2	
Oxford United	11 March 2023	7 November 2023	29	14	7	8	48.3	
Bristol City	7 November 2023	3 June 2025	85	29	28	28	34.1	
Norwich City	3 June 2025	8 November 2025	17	3	3	11	17.6	
Huddersfield Town	20 January 2026	25 March 2026	12	5	3	4	41.7	
Total			262	107	64	91	40.8	

== Honours ==
Individual

- EFL League One Manager of the Month: September 2021, January 2022, August 2023
