= Compassionate leave =

Paid leave of absence for personal matters

Compassionate leave is an employee benefit permitting a leave of absence from work to address urgent and distressing personal or family matters. It is often used interchangeably with bereavement leave, though compassionate leave has a broader scope.

== Provisions ==
=== United States ===
In the United States, there are no federal requirements for compassionate leave, though some states have requirements. Depending on the occasion, employees may be eligible for leave under the Family and Medical Leave Act of 1993 (FMLA).

=== Australia ===
In Australia, the Fair Work Act 2009 entitles employees to two days of compassionate leave per occasion.

== Bereavement leave ==
Bereavement leave is a form of compassionate leave that is an employee benefit of leave of absence from work that an employee can take following the death of a loved one meant to provide time for an employee to grieve, make funeral arrangements, and attend services.

=== United States ===
In the United States, there are no federal requirements for bereavement leave, though some states have requirements. Depending on the occasion, employees may be eligible for leave under the Family and Medical Leave Act of 1993 (FMLA).

==== California ====
In California, employers with five or more employees must provide five days of unpaid bereavement leave annually in California that may be taken non-consecutively within 90 days. The employee must be employed for at least 30 days before the leave begins.

==== Washington ====
In Washington, all employers are required to provide paid bereavement leave of up to 3 days, plus seven additional days for the loss of a child.
