= 2022–23 English Football League =

124th season of the English Football League

English Football League
- Season: 2022–23
- Champions: Burnley
- Promoted: Burnley; Sheffield United; Luton Town
- Relegated: Hartlepool United; Rochdale
- New clubs in league: Stockport County; Grimsby Town

The 2022–23 season was the 124th season of the English Football League (EFL) and the seventh season under that name after it was renamed from The Football League in 2016. For the tenth season running, the league is sponsored by Sky Betting & Gaming and is therefore known as the Sky Bet EFL.

The EFL is contested through three divisions: the Championship, League One and League Two. The winner and the runner-up of the Championship are automatically promoted to the Premier League and they are joined by the winner of the Championship play-off. The bottom two teams in League Two are relegated to the National League.

== Promotion and relegation ==
=== From the Premier League ===
Relegated to the Championship

- Burnley
- Watford
- Norwich City

=== From the Championship ===
Promoted to the Premier League

- Fulham
- Bournemouth
- Nottingham Forest

Relegated to League One

- Peterborough United
- Derby County
- Barnsley

=== From League One ===
Promoted to the Championship

- Wigan Athletic
- Rotherham United
- Sunderland

Relegated to League Two

- Gillingham
- Doncaster Rovers
- AFC Wimbledon
- Crewe Alexandra

=== From League Two ===
Promoted to League One

- Forest Green Rovers
- Exeter City
- Bristol Rovers
- Port Vale

Relegated to the National League

- Oldham Athletic
- Scunthorpe United

=== From the National League ===
Promoted to League Two

- Stockport County
- Grimsby Town

== Championship ==
=== Table ===
Pos	Team	Pld	W	D	L	GF	GA	GD	Pts	Promotion, qualification or relegation
1	Burnley (C, P)	46	29	14	3	87	35	+52	101	Promotion to Premier League
2	Sheffield United (P)	46	28	7	11	73	39	+34	91	Promotion to Premier League
3	Luton Town (O, P)	46	21	17	8	57	39	+18	80	Qualification for Championship play-offs
4	Middlesbrough	46	22	9	15	84	56	+28	75	Qualification for Championship play-offs
5	Coventry City	46	18	16	12	58	46	+12	70	Qualification for Championship play-offs
6	Sunderland	46	18	15	13	68	55	+13	69	Qualification for Championship play-offs
7	Blackburn Rovers	46	20	9	17	52	54	−2	69	
8	Millwall	46	19	11	16	57	50	+7	68	
9	West Bromwich Albion	46	18	12	16	59	53	+6	66	
10	Swansea City	46	18	12	16	68	64	+4	66	
11	Watford	46	16	15	15	56	53	+3	63	
12	Preston North End	46	17	12	17	45	59	−14	63	
13	Norwich City	46	17	11	18	57	54	+3	62	
14	Bristol City	46	15	14	17	55	56	−1	59	
15	Hull City	46	14	16	16	51	61	−10	58	
16	Stoke City	46	14	11	21	55	54	+1	53	
17	Birmingham City	46	14	11	21	47	58	−11	53	
18	Huddersfield Town	46	14	11	21	47	62	−15	53	
19	Rotherham United	46	11	17	18	49	60	−11	50	
20	Queens Park Rangers	46	13	11	22	44	71	−27	50	
21	Cardiff City	46	13	10	23	41	58	−17	49	
22	Reading (R)	46	13	11	22	46	68	−22	44 (Note: Reading were deducted 6 points for breaching an EFL business plan.)	Relegation to League One
23	Blackpool (R)	46	11	11	24	48	72	−24	44	Relegation to League One
24	Wigan Athletic (R)	46	10	15	21	38	65	−27	42 (Note: In March 2023, Wigan Athletic were deducted 3 points for failing to pay players and staff on time.)	Relegation to League One

Source: EFL Official Website
Rules for classification: 1) Points; 2) Goal difference; 3) Number of goals scored; 4) Head-to-head results; 5) Wins; 6) Away goals; 7) Penalty points (sec 9.5); 8) 12-point sending off offences
(C) Champions; (O) Play-off winners; (P) Promoted; (R) Relegated

=== Results ===
Home \ Away	BIR	BLB	BLP	BRC	BUR	CAR	COV	HUD	HUL	LUT	MID	MIL	NOR	PNE	QPR	REA	ROT	SHU	STO	SUN	SWA	WAT	WBA	WIG
Birmingham City	—	1–0	0–1	3–0	1–1	0–2	0–0	2–1	0–1	0–1	1–3	0–0	1–2	1–2	2–0	3–2	2–0	1–2	0–0	1–2	2–2	1–1	2–0	0–1
Blackburn Rovers	2–1	—	1–0	2–3	0–1	1–0	1–1	1–0	0–0	1–1	1–2	2–1	0–2	1–4	1–0	2–1	3–0	1–0	0–1	2–0	1–0	2–0	2–1	0–0
Blackpool	0–0	0–1	—	3–3	0–0	1–3	1–4	2–2	1–3	0–1	0–3	2–3	0–1	4–2	6–1	1–0	0–0	1–2	1–0	1–1	0–1	3–1	0–2	1–0
Bristol City	4–2	1–1	2–0	—	1–2	2–0	0–0	2–0	1–0	2–0	2–2	1–2	1–0	2–1	1–2	1–1	2–1	0–1	1–2	2–3	1–1	0–0	0–2	1–1
Burnley	3–0	3–0	3–3	2–1	—	3–0	1–0	4–0	1–1	1–1	3–1	2–0	1–0	3–0	1–2	2–1	3–2	2–0	1–1	0–0	4–0	1–1	2–1	3–0
Cardiff City	1–0	1–0	1–1	2–0	1–1	—	0–1	1–2	2–3	1–2	1–3	0–1	1–0	0–0	0–0	1–0	1–0	0–1	1–1	0–1	2–3	1–2	1–1	1–1
Coventry City	2–0	1–0	1–2	1–1	0–1	0–0	—	2–0	1–1	1–1	1–0	1–0	2–4	0–1	2–0	2–1	2–2	1–0	0–4	2–1	3–3	2–2	1–0	2–0
Huddersfield Town	2–1	2–2	0–1	0–0	0–1	1–0	0–4	—	2–0	1–2	4–2	1–0	1–1	0–1	1–1	2–0	2–0	1–0	3–1	0–2	0–0	0–2	2–2	1–2
Hull City	0–2	0–1	1–1	2–1	1–3	1–0	3–2	1–1	—	0–2	1–3	1–0	2–1	0–0	3–0	1–2	0–0	0–2	0–3	1–1	1–1	1–0	2–0	2–1
Luton Town	0–0	2–0	3–1	1–0	0–1	1–0	2–2	3–3	0–0	—	2–1	2–2	2–1	0–1	3–1	0–0	1–1	1–1	1–0	1–1	1–0	2–0	2–3	1–2
Middlesbrough	1–0	1–2	3–0	1–1	1–2	2–3	1–1	0–0	3–1	2–1	—	1–0	5–1	4–0	3–1	5–0	0–0	2–2	1–1	1–0	2–1	2–0	1–1	4–1
Millwall	0–1	3–4	2–1	0–0	1–1	2–0	3–2	0–1	0–0	0–0	2–0	—	2–3	2–0	0–2	0–1	3–0	3–2	2–0	1–1	2–1	3–0	2–1	1–1
Norwich City	3–1	0–2	0–1	3–2	0–3	2–0	3–0	2–1	3–1	0–1	1–2	2–0	—	2–3	0–0	1–1	0–0	0–1	3–1	0–1	0–3	0–1	1–1	1–1
Preston North End	0–1	1–1	3–1	1–2	1–1	2–0	0–0	1–2	0–0	1–1	2–1	2–4	0–4	—	0–1	2–1	0–0	0–2	0–2	0–3	1–0	0–0	1–0	2–1
Queens Park Rangers	0–1	1–3	0–1	0–2	0–3	3–0	0–3	1–2	3–1	0–3	3–2	1–2	1–1	0–2	—	2–1	1–1	1–1	0–0	0–3	1–1	1–0	0–1	2–1
Reading	1–1	3–0	3–1	2–0	0–0	2–1	1–0	3–1	1–1	1–1	1–0	0–1	1–1	1–2	2–2	—	2–1	0–1	2–1	0–3	2–1	2–2	0–2	1–1
Rotherham United	2–0	4–0	3–0	1–3	2–2	1–2	0–2	2–1	2–4	0–2	1–0	1–1	1–2	1–2	3–1	4–0	—	0–0	2–2	2–1	1–1	1–1	3–1	0–2
Sheffield United	1–1	3–0	3–3	1–0	5–2	4–1	3–1	1–0	1–0	0–1	1–3	2–0	2–2	4–1	0–1	4–0	0–1	—	3–1	2–1	3–0	1–0	2–0	1–0
Stoke City	1–2	3–2	2–0	1–2	0–1	2–2	0–2	3–0	0–0	2–0	2–2	0–1	0–0	0–1	0–1	4–0	0–1	3–1	—	0–1	1–1	0–4	1–2	0–1
Sunderland	2–1	2–1	0–0	1–1	2–4	0–1	1–1	1–1	4–4	1–1	2–0	3–0	0–1	0–0	2–2	1–0	3–0	1–2	1–5	—	1–3	2–2	1–2	2–1
Swansea City	3–4	0–3	2–1	2–0	1–2	2–0	0–0	1–0	3–0	0–2	1–3	2–2	0–1	4–2	1–0	3–2	1–1	0–1	1–3	2–1	—	4–0	3–2	2–2
Watford	3–0	1–1	2–0	2–0	1–0	1–3	0–1	2–3	0–0	4–0	2–1	0–2	2–1	0–0	2–3	2–0	1–1	1–0	2–0	2–2	1–2	—	3–2	1–1
West Bromwich Albion	2–3	1–1	1–0	0–2	1–1	0–0	1–0	1–0	5–2	0–0	2–0	0–0	2–1	2–0	2–2	1–0	3–0	0–2	2–0	1–2	2–3	1–1	—	1–0
Wigan Athletic	1–1	1–0	2–1	1–1	1–5	1–3	1–1	1–0	1–4	0–2	1–4	2–1	0–0	0–0	1–0	0–1	0–0	1–2	0–1	1–4	0–2	0–1	1–1	—

Source: EFL.com
Legend: Blue = home team win; Yellow = draw; Red = away team win.
For upcoming matches, an "a" indicates there is an article about the rivalry between the two participants.

=== Play-offs ===
Semi-finals
3	Luton Town	1	2	3
6	Sunderland	2	0	2
4	Middlesbrough	0	0	0
5	Coventry City	0	1	1

Final
3	Luton Town	1 (6)
5	Coventry City	1 (5)

First leg

13 May 2023
17:30

Sunderland	2–1	Luton Town
Diallo 39'; Hume 63'	Report	Adebayo 11'

Stadium of Light, Sunderland
Attendance: 46,060
Referee: Tim Robinson
14 May 2023
12:00

Coventry City	0–0	Middlesbrough
	Report

Coventry Building Society Arena, Coventry
Attendance: 28,874
Referee: Robert Madley

Second leg

16 May 2023
20:00

Luton Town	2–0	Sunderland
Osho 10'; Lockyer 43'	Report

Kenilworth Road, Luton
Attendance: 10,013
Referee: Simon Hooper

Luton Town won 3–2 on aggregate.

17 May 2023
20:00

Middlesbrough	0–1	Coventry City
	Report	Hamer 57'

Riverside Stadium, Middlesbrough
Attendance: 32,154
Referee: David Coote

Coventry City won 1–0 on aggregate.

=== Final ===
27 May 2023
16:45 BST

Coventry City	1–1 (a.e.t.)	Luton Town
Hamer 66'	Report	Clark 23'
Penalties
Godden (penalty scored); Gyökeres (penalty scored); Sheaf (penalty scored); Eccles (penalty scored); Kelly (penalty scored); Dabo (penalty missed)	5–6	(penalty scored) Morris; (penalty scored) Taylor; (penalty scored) Nakamba; (penalty scored) Clark; (penalty scored) Berry; (penalty scored) Potts

Wembley Stadium, London
Attendance: 85,711
Referee: Michael Oliver

== League One ==
=== Table ===
Pos	Team	Pld	W	D	L	GF	GA	GD	Pts	Promotion, qualification or relegation
1	Plymouth Argyle (C, P)	46	31	8	7	82	47	+35	101	Promotion to EFL Championship
2	Ipswich Town (P)	46	28	14	4	101	35	+66	98	Promotion to EFL Championship
3	Sheffield Wednesday (O, P)	46	28	12	6	81	37	+44	96	Qualification for League One play-offs
4	Barnsley	46	26	8	12	80	47	+33	86	Qualification for League One play-offs
5	Bolton Wanderers	46	23	12	11	62	36	+26	81	Qualification for League One play-offs
6	Peterborough United	46	24	5	17	75	54	+21	77	Qualification for League One play-offs
7	Derby County	46	21	13	12	67	46	+21	76	
8	Portsmouth	46	17	19	10	61	50	+11	70	
9	Wycombe Wanderers	46	20	9	17	59	51	+8	69	
10	Charlton Athletic	46	16	14	16	70	66	+4	62	
11	Lincoln City	46	14	20	12	47	47	0	62	
12	Shrewsbury Town	46	17	8	21	52	61	−9	59	
13	Fleetwood Town	46	14	16	16	53	51	+2	58	
14	Exeter City	46	15	11	20	64	68	−4	56	
15	Burton Albion	46	15	11	20	57	79	−22	56	
16	Cheltenham Town	46	14	12	20	45	61	−16	54	
17	Bristol Rovers	46	14	11	21	58	73	−15	53	
18	Port Vale	46	13	10	23	48	71	−23	49	
19	Oxford United	46	11	14	21	49	56	−7	47	
20	Cambridge United	46	13	7	26	41	68	−27	46	
21	Milton Keynes Dons (R)	46	11	12	23	44	66	−22	45	Relegation to EFL League Two
22	Morecambe (R)	46	10	14	22	47	78	−31	44	Relegation to EFL League Two
23	Accrington Stanley (R)	46	11	11	24	40	77	−37	44	Relegation to EFL League Two
24	Forest Green Rovers (R)	46	6	9	31	31	89	−58	27	Relegation to EFL League Two

Source: EFL Official Website
Rules for classification: 1) Points; 2) Goal difference; 3) Number of goals scored; 4) Head-to-head results; 5) Wins; 6) Away goals; 7) Penalty points (sec 9.5); 8) 12-point sending off offences
(C) Champions; (O) Play-off winners; (P) Promoted; (R) Relegated

=== Results ===
Home \ Away	ACC	BAR	BOL	BRI	BRT	CAM	CHA	CHE	DER	EXE	FLE	FOR	IPS	LIN	MKD	MOR	OXF	PET	PLY	POR	PVL	SHE	SHR	WYC
Accrington Stanley	—	1–1	2–3	2–0	4–4	1–2	2–2	1–0	0–3	0–0	2–5	2–1	0–2	0–3	0–1	3–1	1–1	1–2	0–2	1–3	3–0	0–1	1–0	0–2
Barnsley	3–1	—	0–3	3–0	2–0	2–0	3–1	1–0	4–1	0–2	2–1	2–0	0–3	0–1	3–1	5–0	2–0	0–2	3–0	3–1	1–1	4–2	2–1	0–3
Bolton Wanderers	0–1	0–0	—	1–1	2–1	1–1	3–1	1–0	0–0	2–0	2–0	1–0	0–2	2–0	5–0	1–0	1–3	1–0	0–0	3–0	2–1	0–2	1–0	3–0
Bristol Rovers	0–1	0–0	2–3	—	1–2	2–1	1–0	2–1	1–1	3–4	2–2	1–2	0–0	3–6	0–2	2–2	1–0	1–0	2–2	0–2	1–0	1–2	1–1	0–2
Burton Albion	0–0	2–1	1–1	0–4	—	1–0	3–3	1–0	1–1	1–0	0–1	3–2	0–1	3–0	0–0	1–1	2–0	2–5	2–2	0–2	0–2	3–2	0–4	2–1
Cambridge United	0–1	0–3	0–0	1–2	4–3	—	1–2	1–2	0–2	2–1	2–1	2–0	1–1	2–0	1–0	1–1	1–0	2–0	0–0	0–1	0–1	0–2	2–1	1–2
Charlton Athletic	1–1	2–0	1–2	1–2	3–2	1–1	—	0–1	1–0	4–2	1–2	1–1	4–4	2–1	0–2	2–3	1–1	1–1	5–1	3–0	3–2	0–1	6–0	1–1
Cheltenham Town	0–0	0–4	1–0	1–4	0–0	2–1	2–2	—	2–3	3–1	1–0	3–1	1–1	0–0	0–0	1–0	1–2	2–3	0–1	0–2	0–0	2–2	2–0	1–0
Derby County	4–0	2–1	2–1	4–2	1–0	1–0	2–0	2–0	—	0–0	0–2	4–0	0–2	1–1	1–1	5–0	1–0	2–1	2–3	1–1	1–2	0–0	2–2	2–1
Exeter City	5–0	3–1	0–1	2–2	0–2	2–0	1–2	0–1	1–2	—	2–1	1–1	0–2	2–1	1–0	3–2	2–4	3–2	0–1	0–0	4–0	1–1	0–0	3–1
Fleetwood Town	3–0	0–1	1–2	1–2	2–3	1–0	1–1	0–0	0–0	2–2	—	1–1	2–2	2–1	1–0	1–0	1–2	1–0	2–1	0–2	1–1	1–2	0–1	1–1
Forest Green Rovers	2–1	1–5	1–0	1–3	1–2	2–1	0–1	1–0	0–2	0–4	0–0	—	1–2	1–1	1–2	1–2	0–3	0–2	0–3	0–1	1–3	1–0	0–2	0–2
Ipswich Town	3–0	2–2	1–1	2–0	4–0	3–0	6–0	1–1	1–0	6–0	1–1	4–0	—	0–1	3–0	4–0	3–0	2–1	1–1	3–2	2–1	2–2	2–0	4–0
Lincoln City	1–1	0–0	1–1	1–0	0–1	0–0	0–0	2–0	2–0	1–1	2–2	1–1	1–1	—	1–1	2–1	1–0	0–3	1–1	0–0	3–2	1–1	1–0	0–0
Milton Keynes Dons	1–1	4–4	0–2	0–1	1–1	1–0	0–1	2–2	1–3	0–2	1–2	1–0	0–1	0–0	—	1–0	1–1	2–3	1–4	1–1	2–1	0–1	0–1	0–1
Morecambe	2–0	1–0	0–0	5–1	5–0	1–2	1–4	2–1	1–1	1–1	1–1	1–1	1–2	3–2	0–4	—	1–1	0–3	1–3	1–1	1–0	0–3	0–0	1–0
Oxford United	1–2	1–2	0–1	0–3	2–1	1–0	3–1	4–0	2–3	0–1	1–1	1–1	2–1	1–2	1–2	1–1	—	1–2	1–3	1–1	4–0	1–1	0–1	0–1
Peterborough United	3–1	1–2	0–5	0–0	1–1	1–0	0–0	0–3	2–0	3–1	0–1	4–1	0–3	4–0	2–0	3–0	0–0	—	5–2	2–1	3–0	2–0	2–1	0–3
Plymouth Argyle	3–0	1–0	2–0	2–0	1–0	3–1	2–0	4–2	2–1	4–2	0–0	2–0	2–1	0–2	3–1	2–1	1–0	2–0	—	3–1	0–2	2–1	2–1	1–0
Portsmouth	1–0	1–1	3–1	3–1	1–0	4–1	1–3	4–0	0–0	2–0	1–1	1–0	2–2	0–0	0–2	0–0	1–1	2–1	2–2	—	2–2	0–1	1–1	2–2
Port Vale	1–1	1–3	0–0	2–0	2–3	0–2	1–0	2–2	1–2	1–0	2–1	2–2	2–3	1–0	1–0	1–0	0–0	0–2	1–3	0–1	—	0–1	2–1	0–3
Sheffield Wednesday	3–0	0–2	1–1	1–1	4–2	5–0	1–0	3–0	1–0	2–1	1–0	5–0	2–2	1–1	5–2	3–0	0–0	1–0	1–0	3–3	2–0	—	1–0	3–1
Shrewsbury Town	0–1	0–1	3–2	2–1	2–1	5–1	0–1	0–1	0–0	3–2	0–3	2–1	0–3	2–0	2–1	3–1	1–1	0–3	1–2	1–1	3–2	0–3	—	2–0
Wycombe Wanderers	1–0	0–1	1–0	2–1	3–0	2–3	1–1	0–3	3–2	1–1	2–0	2–0	1–0	0–2	2–2	1–1	2–0	3–1	0–1	2–0	2–2	0–1	1–2	—

Legend: Blue = home team win; Yellow = draw; Red = away team win.
For upcoming matches, an "a" indicates there is an article about the rivalry between the two participants.

=== Play-offs ===
Semi-finals
6	Peterborough United	4	1	5 (3)
3	Sheffield Wednesday (p)	0	5	5 (5)
5	Bolton Wanderers	1	0	1
4	Barnsley	1	1	2

Final
4	Barnsley	0
3	Sheffield Wednesday	1

First leg

12 May 2023
20:00

Peterborough United	4–0	Sheffield Wednesday
Taylor 20'; Ward 36'; Poku 50'; Clarke-Harris 82'	Report

London Road, Peterborough
Attendance: 12,569
Referee: Anthony Backhouse
13 May 2023
15:00

Bolton Wanderers	1–1	Barnsley
Charles 67'	Report	Cadden 63'

University of Bolton Stadium, Horwich
Attendance: 23,450
Referee: Andrew Kitchen

Second leg

18 May 2023
20:00

Sheffield Wednesday	5–1 (a.e.t.)	Peterborough United
Smith 9' (pen.); Gregory 25'; James 71'; Palmer 90+8'; Paterson 112'	Report	Gregory 105' (o.g.)
Penalties
Smith (penalty scored); Vaulks (penalty scored); Bannan (penalty scored); Windass (penalty scored); Hunt (penalty scored)	5–3	(penalty scored) Clarke-Harris; (penalty missed) Butler; (penalty scored) Norburn; (penalty scored) Tshimanga

Hillsborough, Owlerton
Attendance: 31,835
Referee: David Webb

5–5 on aggregate. Sheffield Wednesday won 5–3 on penalties. Main article: Miracle of Hillsborough

19 May 2023
20:00

Barnsley	1–0	Bolton Wanderers
Kitching 24'	Report

Oakwell Stadium, Barnsley
Attendance: 16,274
Referee: Michael Salisbury

Barnsley won 2–1 on aggregate.

=== Final ===
29 May 2023
15:00 BST

Barnsley	0–1 (a.e.t.)	Sheffield Wednesday
		Windass 120+3'

Wembley Stadium, London
Attendance: 72,492
Referee: Tim Robinson

== League Two ==
=== Table ===
Pos	Team	Pld	W	D	L	GF	GA	GD	Pts	Promotion, qualification or relegation
1	Leyton Orient (C, P)	46	26	13	7	61	34	+27	91	Promotion to EFL League One
2	Stevenage (P)	46	24	13	9	61	39	+22	85	Promotion to EFL League One
3	Northampton Town (P)	46	23	14	9	62	42	+20	83	Promotion to EFL League One
4	Stockport County	46	22	13	11	65	37	+28	79	Qualification for League Two play-offs
5	Carlisle United (O, P)	46	20	16	10	66	43	+23	76	Qualification for League Two play-offs
6	Bradford City	46	20	16	10	61	43	+18	76	Qualification for League Two play-offs
7	Salford City	46	22	9	15	72	54	+18	75	Qualification for League Two play-offs
8	Mansfield Town	46	21	12	13	72	55	+17	75	
9	Barrow	46	18	8	20	47	53	−6	62	
10	Swindon Town	46	16	13	17	61	55	+6	61	
11	Grimsby Town	46	16	13	17	49	56	−7	61	
12	Tranmere Rovers	46	15	13	18	45	48	−3	58	
13	Crewe Alexandra	46	14	16	16	48	60	−12	58	
14	Sutton United	46	15	13	18	46	58	−12	58	
15	Newport County	46	14	15	17	53	56	−3	57	
16	Walsall	46	12	19	15	46	49	−3	55	
17	Gillingham	46	14	13	19	36	49	−13	55	
18	Doncaster Rovers	46	16	7	23	46	65	−19	55	
19	Harrogate Town	46	12	16	18	59	68	−9	52	
20	Colchester United	46	12	13	21	44	51	−7	49	
21	AFC Wimbledon	46	11	15	20	48	60	−12	48	
22	Crawley Town	46	11	13	22	48	71	−23	46	
23	Hartlepool United (R)	46	9	16	21	52	78	−26	43	Relegation to National League
24	Rochdale (R)	46	9	11	26	46	70	−24	38	Relegation to National League

Source: EFL Official Website
Rules for classification: 1) Points; 2) Goal difference; 3) Number of goals scored; 4) Head-to-head results; 5) Wins; 6) Away goals; 7) Penalty points (sec 9.5); 8) 12-point sending off offences
(C) Champions; (O) Play-off winners; (P) Promoted; (R) Relegated

=== Results ===
Home \ Away	WIM	BAR	BRA	CAR	COL	CRA	CRE	DON	GIL	GRI	HAR	HTL	LEY	MAN	NEW	NOR	ROC	SAL	STE	STO	SUT	SWI	TRA	WAL
AFC Wimbledon	—	0–1	0–0	0–0	2–1	0–1	1–1	2–2	2–0	1–0	3–2	2–2	2–0	1–3	1–1	0–2	0–1	2–3	2–3	1–0	0–1	1–5	1–1	2–0
Barrow	2–1	—	3–2	0–1	3–1	4–0	3–0	2–0	2–1	1–0	1–0	3–1	0–2	0–1	0–1	0–2	0–0	1–1	0–1	1–0	0–0	0–1	1–2	2–1
Bradford City	2–2	0–1	—	0–0	2–0	1–1	0–0	0–0	2–2	3–2	1–0	2–2	1–1	1–1	2–0	1–3	1–2	3–2	3–0	0–1	3–1	1–1	2–0	2–1
Carlisle United	2–1	5–1	1–0	—	1–0	1–0	0–0	3–0	1–0	2–0	0–1	3–1	2–3	0–4	2–1	0–0	3–3	2–3	0–0	2–2	1–1	1–1	2–0	0–0
Colchester United	1–2	1–1	1–0	1–1	—	2–2	4–0	3–0	0–2	0–1	2–1	1–1	1–3	0–2	0–0	0–1	0–1	1–1	1–1	0–1	4–1	1–0	1–1	0–0
Crawley Town	0–2	1–0	0–0	2–5	0–0	—	2–2	1–1	0–0	1–1	3–1	0–2	0–1	3–2	2–1	2–3	2–0	3–2	1–2	3–2	1–2	2–0	2–1	0–0
Crewe Alexandra	0–0	3–0	3–2	0–3	1–0	1–0	—	1–1	1–1	0–3	3–0	2–0	0–2	1–2	1–2	2–2	1–1	4–3	1–2	1–1	1–0	2–1	1–0	2–0
Doncaster Rovers	2–1	1–0	0–1	2–1	1–0	4–1	0–2	—	1–0	1–2	0–2	0–1	1–1	1–3	1–3	0–2	4–3	2–1	0–1	2–1	2–1	0–1	2–0	0–2
Gillingham	2–1	1–1	0–2	1–0	0–1	1–0	2–1	1–0	—	2–1	0–2	2–0	2–0	0–2	1–2	0–2	1–0	0–3	1–1	1–1	1–0	0–0	2–0	0–0
Grimsby Town	1–0	1–0	0–0	1–2	0–1	3–0	2–0	1–3	1–1	—	0–0	1–4	2–2	1–1	1–1	1–1	1–0	1–4	1–1	1–0	0–0	1–2	2–1	1–1
Harrogate Town	2–2	1–0	1–2	3–3	1–3	0–0	2–2	2–2	0–0	3–2	—	2–1	0–2	3–0	0–4	1–1	1–1	0–1	1–1	1–3	0–1	3–0	1–1	3–0
Hartlepool United	0–0	3–1	1–3	1–3	1–2	0–2	1–1	2–1	0–0	2–1	3–3	—	1–1	1–2	0–1	1–1	2–0	0–2	1–1	0–5	2–2	2–1	0–0	3–3
Leyton Orient	1–0	0–0	3–0	1–0	2–2	1–0	2–0	1–0	2–0	2–0	2–2	4–2	—	1–0	1–2	0–0	2–1	1–0	0–0	0–3	2–0	1–1	2–0	1–0
Mansfield Town	5–2	2–3	1–2	0–0	2–1	4–1	1–1	4–1	2–0	0–0	1–2	2–2	1–2	—	0–0	1–1	1–1	2–5	1–0	2–1	0–0	2–5	1–0	2–1
Newport County	1–1	0–2	1–1	1–1	1–0	2–2	2–2	0–1	2–0	0–2	2–3	2–0	0–0	1–2	—	3–0	0–1	2–3	2–2	1–2	0–2	2–1	2–1	0–1
Northampton Town	0–0	3–1	1–2	2–1	3–2	1–0	1–0	0–1	2–1	1–2	3–1	2–1	1–0	1–0	1–1	—	3–0	0–1	1–1	2–1	2–2	1–2	0–0	0–0
Rochdale	1–2	2–1	0–3	0–1	1–2	1–1	1–2	1–2	0–2	0–1	1–2	1–2	0–1	0–1	1–1	1–1	—	1–0	2–0	1–2	4–1	4–4	2–2	4–2
Salford City	0–0	1–1	0–1	1–4	0–1	2–2	3–0	3–1	0–1	1–1	1–1	2–0	0–2	2–0	3–1	2–1	2–1	—	1–0	0–2	2–0	1–2	0–1	1–0
Stevenage	2–1	5–0	2–3	2–1	1–1	3–1	1–0	1–0	1–0	2–0	1–0	1–0	3–0	0–0	1–0	2–3	1–0	1–3	—	2–1	3–0	2–0	0–1	3–1
Stockport County	1–0	2–3	0–0	2–0	1–0	2–1	2–0	0–0	0–0	1–3	0–0	1–1	1–2	1–1	4–0	2–0	1–0	1–1	2–0	—	3–0	1–1	3–2	1–1
Sutton United	2–1	1–0	0–2	1–1	1–0	3–0	1–1	2–0	2–1	0–1	2–1	2–0	0–2	2–1	1–1	1–2	1–0	1–2	0–0	0–1	—	2–1	0–2	1–1
Swindon Town	0–0	0–0	1–0	1–2	1–0	2–1	0–1	0–2	3–3	5–0	3–0	2–1	1–1	2–4	1–0	1–2	3–0	0–0	0–1	0–1	3–2	—	1–1	1–2
Tranmere Rovers	0–2	1–0	1–2	0–2	2–0	1–0	3–0	3–0	3–0	2–0	1–1	1–1	1–0	0–2	1–3	0–1	1–1	1–0	1–2	0–0	2–2	1–0	—	1–1
Walsall	3–1	0–1	0–0	0–0	1–1	2–1	0–0	2–1	2–0	1–2	3–1	4–0	1–1	2–1	1–1	1–0	1–0	2–3	1–1	0–2	1–1	0–0	0–1	—

Legend: Blue = home team win; Yellow = draw; Red = away team win.
For upcoming matches, an "a" indicates there is an article about the rivalry between the two participants.

=== Play-offs ===
Semi-finals
7	Salford City	1	1	2 (1)
4	Stockport County (p)	0	2	2 (3)
6	Bradford City	1	1	2
5	Carlisle United	0	3	3

Final
4	Stockport County	1 (4)
5	Carlisle United (p)	1 (5)

=== Semi-Finals ===
First leg

13 May 2023
19:45

Salford City	1–0	Stockport County
Smith 17'	Report

Moor Lane, Salford
Attendance: 3,923
Referee: Tom Nield
14 May 2023
19:00

Bradford City	1–0	Carlisle United
Walker 18'	Report

Valley Parade, Bradford
Attendance: 20,575
Referee: Ross Joyce

Second leg

20 May 2023
12:30

Stockport County	2–1 (a.e.t.)	Salford City
Olaofe 68'; Stretton 115'	Report	Mallan 112'
Penalties
Madden (penalty scored); Croasdale (penalty missed); Collar (penalty scored); Sarcevic (penalty scored)	3–1	(penalty missed) Lund; (penalty missed) Mariappa; (penalty scored) Barry; (penalty missed) Mallen

Edgeley Park, Stockport
Attendance: 10,023
Referee: Ben Toner

2–2 on Aggregate. Stockport County wins 3–1 on penalties

20 May 2023
15:00

Carlisle United	3–1 (a.e.t.)	Bradford City
Halliday 21' (o.g.); Guy 98'; Barclay 112'	Report	Derbyshire 106'

Brunton Park, Carlisle
Attendance: 15,401
Referee: Simon Mather

Carlisle United won 3–2 on Aggregate.

=== Final ===
28 May 2023
13:30 BST

Stockport County	1–1 (a.e.t.)	Carlisle United
Mellish 34' (o.g.)	Report	Patrick 84'
Penalties
Lemonheigh-Evans (penalty scored); Rydel (penalty missed); Hippolyte (penalty scored); Stretton (penalty scored); Collar (penalty scored)	4–5	(penalty scored) Dennis; (penalty scored) Mellish; (penalty scored) Edmondson; (penalty scored) Moxon; (penalty scored) Charters

Wembley Stadium, London
Attendance: 34,004
Referee: Tom Nield

== Managerial changes ==
Team	Outgoing manager	Manner of departure	Date of vacancy	Position in table	Incoming manager	Date of appointment	Position in table
Colchester United	(England) Hayden Mullins	Sacked	19 January 2022	2021–22 English Football League	(England) Wayne Brown	17 May 2022	Pre-season
Reading	(Serbia) Veljko Paunović	Mutual consent	19 February 2022	2021–22 English Football League	(England) Paul Ince	16 May 2022	Pre-season
Burnley	(England) Sean Dyche	Sacked	15 April 2022	2021–22 Premier League	(Belgium) Vincent Kompany	14 June 2022	Pre-season
Barnsley	(Sweden) Poya Asbaghi	Mutual consent	24 April 2022	2021–22 English Football League	(Northern Ireland) Michael Duff	13 June 2022	Pre-season
Lincoln City	(England) Michael Appleton	Mutual consent	30 April 2022	Pre-season	(Republic of Ireland) Mark Kennedy	12 May 2022	Pre-season
Charlton Athletic	(England) Johnnie Jackson	End of contract	3 May 2022	Pre-season	(England) Ben Garner	8 June 2022	Pre-season
Hartlepool United	(England) Graeme Lee	Sacked	5 May 2022	Pre-season	(Scotland) Paul Hartley	3 June 2022	Pre-season
Crawley Town	(England) John Yems	Sacked	6 May 2022	Pre-season	(Seychelles) Kevin Betsy	6 June 2022	Pre-season
Queens Park Rangers	(England) Mark Warburton	End of contract	7 May 2022	Pre-season	(England) Michael Beale	1 June 2022	Pre-season
AFC Wimbledon	(Wales) Mark Bowen	Appointed Reading Head of Football	8 May 2022	Pre-season	(England) Johnnie Jackson	16 May 2022	Pre-season
Blackburn Rovers	(England) Tony Mowbray	End of contract	11 May 2022	Pre-season	(Denmark) Jon Dahl Tomasson	14 June 2022	Pre-season
Forest Green Rovers	(Wales) Rob Edwards	Appointed Watford Manager	11 May 2022	Pre-season	(England) Ian Burchnall	27 May 2022	Pre-season
Fleetwood Town	(Scotland) Stephen Crainey	Re-appointed as U23 Manager	12 May 2022	Pre-season	(Scotland) Scott Brown	12 May 2022	Pre-season
Barrow	(England) Phil Brown	End of contract	12 May 2022	Pre-season	(England) Pete Wild	27 May 2022	Pre-season
Salford City	(England) Gary Bowyer	Sacked	17 May 2022	Pre-season	(England) Neil Wood	20 May 2022	Pre-season
Watford	(England) Roy Hodgson	End of contract	23 May 2022	Pre-season	(Wales) Rob Edwards	23 May 2022	Pre-season
Blackpool	(England) Neil Critchley	Appointed Aston Villa Assistant Manager	2 June 2022	Pre-season	(England) Michael Appleton	17 June 2022	Pre-season
Swindon Town	(England) Ben Garner	Appointed Charlton Athletic Manager	8 June 2022	Pre-season	(England) Scott Lindsey	20 June 2022	Pre-season
Cheltenham Town	(Northern Ireland) Michael Duff	Appointed Barnsley Manager	13 June 2022	Pre-season	(England) Wade Elliott	27 June 2022	Pre-season
Derby County	(England) Wayne Rooney	Resigned	24 June 2022	Pre-season	(England) Paul Warne	22 September 2022	7th
Birmingham City	(England) Lee Bowyer	Sacked	2 July 2022	Pre-season	(England) John Eustace	3 July 2022	Pre-season
Huddersfield Town	(Spain) Carlos Corberán	Resigned	7 July 2022	Pre-season	(England) Danny Schofield	7 July 2022	Pre-season
Rochdale	(Scotland) Robbie Stockdale	Sacked	18 August 2022	24th	(England) Jim Bentley	29 August 2022	24th
Stoke City	(Northern Ireland) Michael O'Neill	Sacked	25 August 2022	21st	(Scotland) Alex Neil	28 August 2022	17th
Sunderland	(Scotland) Alex Neil	Appointed Stoke City Manager	28 August 2022	12th	(England) Tony Mowbray	30 August 2022	12th
Burton Albion	(Netherlands) Jimmy Floyd Hasselbaink	Resigned	5 September 2022	24th	(Tunisia) Dino Maamria	6 September 2022	24th
Huddersfield Town	(England) Danny Schofield	Sacked	14 September 2022	23rd	(Scotland) Mark Fotheringham	28 September 2022	23rd
Hartlepool United	(Scotland) Paul Hartley	Sacked	18 September 2022	23rd	(England) Keith Curle	8 December 2022	22nd
Colchester United	(England) Wayne Brown	Sacked	18 September 2022	21st	(England) Matt Bloomfield	30 September 2022	21st
Cardiff City	(Wales) Steve Morison	Sacked	18 September 2022	18th	(England) Mark Hudson	14 November 2022	19th
Rotherham United	(England) Paul Warne	Appointed Derby County Manager	22 September 2022	8th	(England) Matt Taylor	4 October 2022	12th
Watford	(Wales) Rob Edwards	Sacked	26 September 2022	10th	(Croatia) Slaven Bilić	26 September 2022	10th
Hull City	(Georgia (country)) Shota Arveladze	Sacked	30 September 2022	20th	(England) Liam Rosenior	3 November 2022	21st
Middlesbrough	(England) Chris Wilder	Sacked	3 October 2022	22nd	(England) Michael Carrick	24 October 2022	21st
Exeter City	(England) Matt Taylor	Appointed Rotherham United Manager	4 October 2022	11th	(Scotland) Gary Caldwell	24 October 2022	7th
Crawley Town	(Seychelles) Kevin Betsy	Sacked	9 October 2022	24th	(England) Matthew Etherington	27 November 2022	19th
West Bromwich Albion	(England) Steve Bruce	Sacked	10 October 2022	22nd	(Spain) Carlos Corberán	25 October 2022	23rd
Newport County	(Wales) James Rowberry	Sacked	10 October 2022	18th	(Republic of Ireland) Graham Coughlan	20 October 2022	19th
Doncaster Rovers	(England) Gary McSheffrey	Sacked	17 October 2022	12th	(England) Danny Schofield	20 October 2022	12th
Crewe Alexandra	(England) Alex Morris	Appointed Assistant Manager	4 November 2022	16th	(England) Lee Bell	1 December 2022	15th
Luton Town	(Wales) Nathan Jones	Appointed Southampton Manager	10 November 2022	9th	(Wales) Rob Edwards	17 November 2022	10th
Wigan Athletic	(England) Leam Richardson	Sacked	10 November 2022	23rd	(Ivory Coast) Kolo Touré	29 November 2022	22nd
Queens Park Rangers	(England) Michael Beale	Appointed Rangers Manager	28 November 2022	7th	(England) Neil Critchley	11 December 2022	9th
Charlton Athletic	(England) Ben Garner	Sacked	6 December 2022	17th	(England) Dean Holden	20 December 2022	18th
Milton Keynes Dons	(England) Liam Manning	Sacked	11 December 2022	23rd	(England) Mark Jackson	23 December 2022	22nd
Norwich City	(England) Dean Smith	Sacked	27 December 2022	5th	(United States) David Wagner	6 January 2023	11th
Crawley Town	(England) Matthew Etherington	Mutual consent	29 December 2022	20th	(England) Scott Lindsey	11 January 2023	21st
Portsmouth	(England) Danny Cowley	Sacked	2 January 2023	12th	(England) John Mousinho	20 January 2023	15th
Peterborough United	(Northern Ireland) Grant McCann	Sacked	4 January 2023	8th	(Scotland) Darren Ferguson	4 January 2023	8th
Swindon Town	(England) Scott Lindsey	Appointed Crawley Town Manager	11 January 2023	8th	(England) Jody Morris	31 January 2023	6th
Cardiff City	(England) Mark Hudson	Sacked	14 January 2023	21st	(France) Sabri Lamouchi	27 January 2023	21st
Blackpool	(England) Michael Appleton	Sacked	18 January 2023	23rd	(Republic of Ireland) Mick McCarthy	19 January 2023	23rd
Forest Green Rovers	(England) Ian Burchnall	Sacked	25 January 2023	24th	(Scotland) Duncan Ferguson	26 January 2023	24th
Wigan Athletic	(Ivory Coast) Kolo Touré	Sacked	26 January 2023	24th	(Scotland) Shaun Maloney	28 January 2023	24th
Huddersfield Town	(Scotland) Mark Fotheringham	Sacked	8 February 2023	22nd	(England) Neil Warnock	13 February 2023	23rd
Queens Park Rangers	(England) Neil Critchley	Sacked	19 February 2023	17th	(England) Gareth Ainsworth	21 February 2023	17th
Wycombe Wanderers	(England) Gareth Ainsworth	Appointed Queens Park Rangers Manager	21 February 2023	7th	(England) Matt Bloomfield	21 February 2023	7th
Colchester United	(England) Matt Bloomfield	Appointed Wycombe Wanderers Manager	21 February 2023	18th	(England) Ben Garner	2 March 2023	19th
Hartlepool United	(England) Keith Curle	Sacked	22 February 2023	22nd	(England) John Askey	23 February 2023	22nd
Oxford United	(England) Karl Robinson	Sacked	26 February 2023	17th	(England) Liam Manning	11 March 2023	18th
Watford	(Croatia) Slaven Bilić	Sacked	7 March 2023	9th	(England) Chris Wilder	7 March 2023	9th
Tranmere Rovers	(Scotland) Micky Mellon	Sacked	19 March 2023	14th	(England) Ian Dawes	4 May 2023	14th
Rochdale	(England) Jim Bentley	Sacked	27 March 2023	24th	(Scotland) Jimmy McNulty	12 May 2023	24th
Blackpool	(Republic of Ireland) Mick McCarthy	Mutual consent	8 April 2023	23rd	(England) Neil Critchley	23 May 2023	23rd
Reading	(England) Paul Ince	Sacked	11 April 2023	22nd	(Spain) Rubén Sellés	26 June 2023	22nd
Port Vale	(England) Darrell Clarke	Sacked	17 April 2023	18th	(England) Andy Crosby	12 May 2023	18th
Walsall	(Wales) Michael Flynn	Sacked	19 April 2023	15th	(England) Mat Sadler	18 May 2023	15th
Swindon Town	(England) Jody Morris	Sacked	1 May 2023	10th	(Wales) Michael Flynn	8 May 2023	10th
