= 2023 EFL League One play-off final =

Association football match

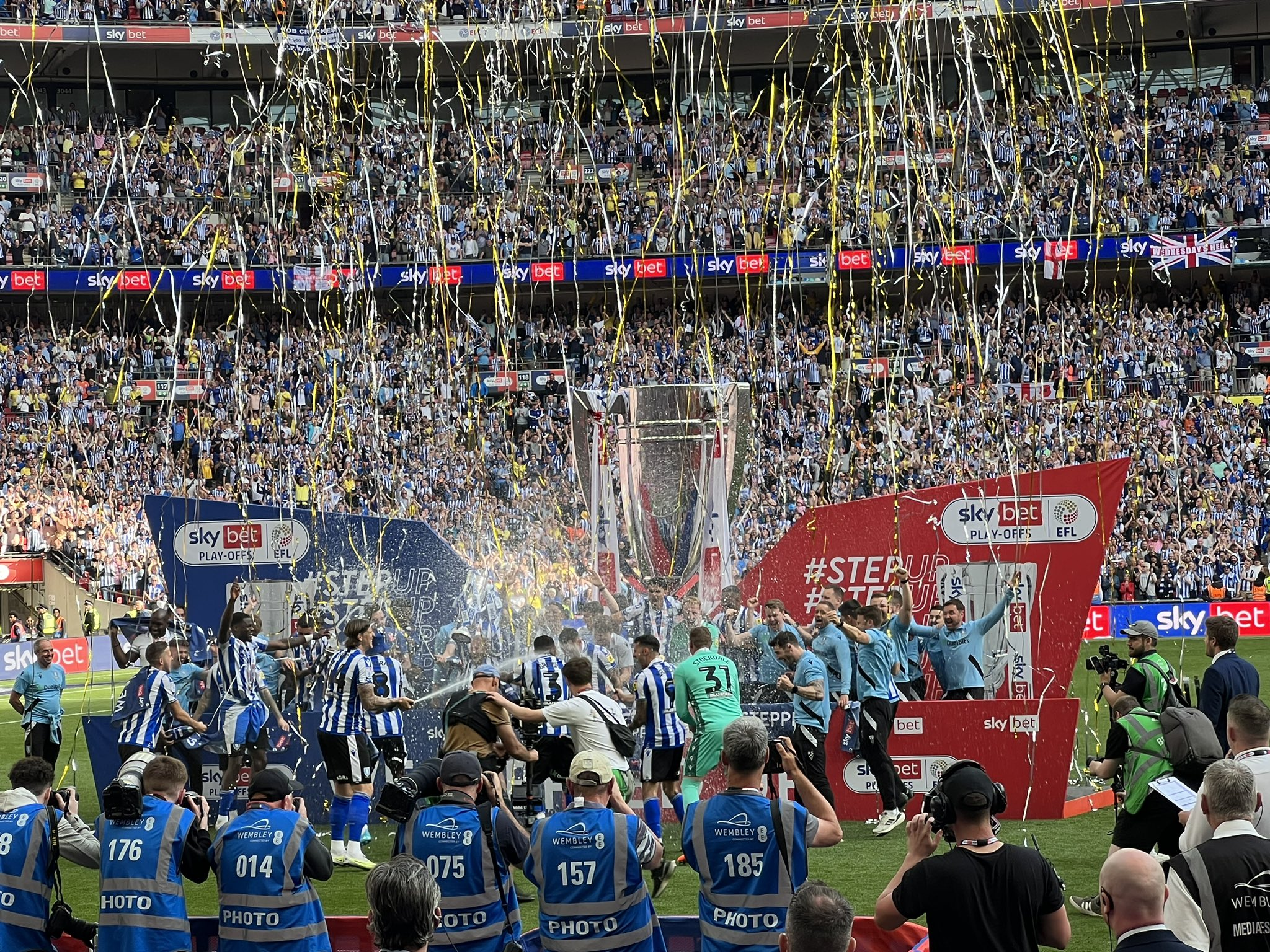
- Sheffield Wednesday lift the play-off trophy after beating Barnsley in the final seconds of the game
Barnsley	Sheffield Wednesday
0	1
- After extra time
- Date: 29 May 2023
- Venue: Wembley Stadium, London
- Referee: Tim Robinson
- Attendance: 72,492

The 2023 EFL League One play-off final was an association football match which took place on 29 May 2023 at Wembley Stadium, London, between Barnsley and Sheffield Wednesday. It determined the third and final team to gain promotion from EFL League One, the third tier of English football, to the EFL Championship. The top two teams of the 2022–23 EFL League One, Plymouth Argyle and Ipswich Town, gained automatic promotion to the Championship, while the clubs placed from third to sixth in the table took part in the 2023 English Football League play-offs. The winners of the play-off semi-finals competed for the final place for the 2023–24 season in the Championship.

Tim Robinson was the referee for the match, which was played in front of 72,492 spectators. After a goalless first half, the second half began with Barnsley being denied a penalty after what they thought was a foul on Liam Kitching, followed by the sending off of Adam Phillips due to a sliding challenge on Sheffield Wednesday's Lee Gregory. The game remained 0–0 after 90 minutes and went into extra time. The deciding goal came in the third minute of stoppage time, with Sheffield Wednesday's Josh Windass heading the ball past Harry Isted, the Barnsley goalkeeper, to give the team a 1–0 win and a position in the Championship for the first time since 2021.

== Route to the final ==
EFL League One final table, leading positions
Pos	Team	Pld	W	D	L	GF	GA	GD	Pts
1	Plymouth Argyle (C, P)	46	31	8	7	82	47	+35	101
2	Ipswich Town (P)	46	28	14	4	101	35	+66	98
3	Sheffield Wednesday (O, P)	46	28	12	6	81	37	+44	96
4	Barnsley	46	26	8	12	80	47	+33	86
5	Bolton Wanderers	46	23	12	11	62	36	+26	81
6	Peterborough United	46	24	5	17	75	54	+21	77

(C) Champions; (O) Play-off winners; (P) Promoted

Sheffield Wednesday finished the regular 2022–23 season in third place in EFL League One, the third tier of the English football league system. They were two points behind runners-up Ipswich Town and ten points ahead of fourth-placed Barnsley. Both Sheffield Wednesday and Barnsley, therefore, missed out on the two automatic places for promotion to the EFL Championship and instead took part in the play-offs to determine the third promoted team. They were joined in the play-offs by fifth-placed Bolton Wanderers, and sixth-placed Peterborough United, who qualified as a result of Derby County's defeat to Sheffield Wednesday on the final day of the regular season. The format for the play-offs was two semi-finals, played over two legs, followed by the final.

Sheffield Wednesday were drawn against Peterborough for their semi-final. In the first leg at Peterborough's London Road Stadium, the home team were dominant despite an early chance from Sheffield Wednesday striker Michael Smith. Peterborough won the game 4–0 with goals from Jack Taylor, Joe Ward, Kwame Poku and Jonson Clarke-Harris. In a match dubbed by the club and local media as the "miracle of Hillsborough", Sheffield Wednesday recovered in the second leg. First-half goals from Smith and Lee Gregory, followed by strikes from Reece James and Liam Palmer after half-time, established a 4–0 lead at the end of 90 minutes and with the tie level on aggregate, it went to extra time. Despite conceding an own goal in the first half of extra time, when a free kick was diverted off Gregory's head into the net, Sheffield Wednesday equalised the tie once more with a goal from striker Callum Patterson. The tie thus finished 5–5 on aggregate and Sheffield Wednesday were victorious in the penalty shootout by a score of 5–3.

Barnsley's play-off semi final was against Bolton, with the first leg at the University of Bolton Stadium. After a goalless first half, Barnsley took the lead due to a goal from Nicky Cadden, but the hosts equalised four minutes later through a goal by Dion Charles. The game finished 1–1 and the two sides went into the second leg at Oakwell on level terms. The second leg was decided by a 24th-minute goal by Liam Kitching, Barnsley going through to the final with a 2–1 aggregate win.

== Match ==
=== Background ===
This was Sheffield Wednesday's third play-off final, the first being a 4-2 victory against Hartlepool United in the 2005 League One play-off final at the Millennium Stadium in Cardiff and the second being a 1–0 defeat against Hull City in the 2016 Championship play-off final. Sheffield Wednesday had last played in the Championship in the 2020–21 season, when they were relegated to League One after being deducted six points for breaking EFL spending rules and then finishing bottom of the league. Aside from the 2016 match, the club's prior visits to Wembley Stadium included the 1935 and 1966 FA Cup finals, which ended in victory and defeat respectively, and then five visits between 1991 and 1993 – a victory over Manchester United in the 1991 League Cup final, a 1993 FA Cup semi-final win against Sheffield United, and successive defeats to Arsenal in the 1993 League Cup final and FA Cup final – the latter including a replay. Barnsley had appeared in three play-off finals before this match. They lost 4–2 to Ipswich Town in the last competitive game at the old Wembley Stadium, beat Swansea City in a penalty shootout to secure promotion in the 2006 Football League One play-off final at the Millennium Stadium, and then defeated Millwall 3–1 in 2016. Barnsley also visited Wembley earlier in the 2015–16 season, with a 3–2 victory over Oxford United in the Football League Trophy final. During the regular season, Barnsley won both matches against Sheffield Wednesday, 2–0 at Hillsborough in September 2022 and 4–2 at Oakwell the following March. Smith was Sheffield Wednesday's highest scorer with 17 goals while Barnsley's top marksman was Devante Cole with 15.

The final was refereed by Tim Robinson, with Shaun Hudson and Akil Howson as his assistants, and John Busby the fourth official. From 2022, the EFL had announced that the video assistant referee (VAR) system would be used at all play-off finals, and Tony Harrington was appointed in this role with Dan Robathan his assistant.

=== Summary ===
The match kicked off at 3 p.m. in front of a crowd 72,492, of whom around 44,000 were Sheffield Wednesday fans and approximately 23,000 were Barnsley supporters. Sheffield Wednesday had the better of the opening 15 minutes, with several chances to score, while Barnsley's best opportunity was a shot from Adam Phillips which went over the crossbar. The game then settled down, however, as Barnsley were able to contain the Sheffield Wednesday attacks and there were few serious chances for the remainder of the half.

The second half began with two controversial decisions which shaped the remainder of the game. The first was a challenge by Gregory on Kitching in the penalty area, was not given as a foul or a penalty by the referee, a decision confirmed by the VAR. Former Barnsley goalkeeper David Preece commented on BBC Sport at the time that he was surprised by this decision because he had "seen in the Premier League penalties given for much lesser reasons than that". The second incident was the referee's decision to send off Phillips due to a sliding challenge on Gregory, again confirmed by VAR. Despite Sheffield Wednesday's numerical advantage due to this decision, the two sides were still level by the end of normal time, although Barnsley had come close to a goal after Nicky Cadden's volley deflected off of the head of Kitching, hitting the crossbar.

In extra time, Sheffield Wednesday were close to taking the lead after a close-range shot from Wednesday striker Smith was saved by Harry Isted, the Barnsley goalkeeper. Barnsley themselves came close to taking the lead a few minutes later, with Luca Connell six yards from the net but was ultimately unable to convert. Sheffield Wednesday believed they had taken the lead a few minutes later following a strike from Will Vaulks into the back of the net, but this was ruled offside by the assistant referee. The deciding goal came in the third minute of stoppage time, with Josh Windass heading the ball past Isted to secure Wednesday's position in the Championship for the first time since 2021.

=== Details ===
29 May 2023
15:00 BST

Barnsley	0–1 (a.e.t.)	Sheffield Wednesday
		Windass 120+3'

Wembley Stadium, London
Attendance: 72,492
Referee: Tim Robinson

Barnsley	Sheffield Wednesday

GK	1	(England) Harry Isted
CB	12	(England) Bobby Thomas (yellow card) 95'
CB	6	(Denmark) Mads Juel Andersen (c)
CB	5	(England) Liam Kitching
RM	2	(England) Jordan Williams
CM	30	(England) Adam Phillips (red card) 49'
CM	48	(Republic of Ireland) Luca Connell
LM	8	(England) Herbie Kane (substituted off) 72'
AM	7	(Scotland) Nicky Cadden (substituted off) 106'
CF	31	(Serbia) Slobodan Tedić (substituted off) 46'
CF	44	(England) Devante Cole (substituted off) 72'
Substitutes:
GK	40	(England) Bradley Collins
DF	24	(England) Robbie Cundy
MF	3	(Jamaica) Jon Russell (substituted on) 90+1'
MF	10	(England) Josh Benson (substituted on) 72' (substituted off) 90+1'
MF	16	(England) Luke Thomas (substituted on) 72'
FW	9	(England) James Norwood (substituted on) 46'
FW	47	(England) Max Watters (substituted on) 106'
Head Coach:
(Northern Ireland) Michael Duff

GK	25	(England) Cameron Dawson
CB	6	(England) Dominic Iorfa
CB	20	(England) Michael Ihiekwe
CB	33	(England) Reece James (substituted off) 103'
DM	13	(Scotland) Callum Paterson (substituted off) 79'
RM	2	(Scotland) Liam Palmer
CM	10	(Scotland) Barry Bannan (c) (substituted off) 116'
CM	18	(England) Marvin Johnson
LM	11	(England) Josh Windass 120+3'
CF	24	(England) Michael Smith
CF	9	(England) Lee Gregory
Substitutes:
GK	31	(England) David Stockdale
DF	3	(England) Jaden Brown
DF	32	(England) Jack Hunt (substituted on) 103'
DF	44	(England) Aden Flint
MF	8	(England) Dennis Adeniran
MF	17	(England) Fisayo Dele-Bashiru (substituted on) 116'
FW	4	(Wales) Will Vaulks (substituted on) 79'
Head Coach:
(Jamaica) Darren Moore

Statistics
	Barnsley F.C.	Sheffield Wednesday F.C.
Possession	46%	54%
Goals scored	0	1
Shots on target	2	8
Shots off target	6	8
Fouls committed	11	12
Corner kicks	5	5
Yellow cards	1	0
Red cards	1	0

== Post-match ==
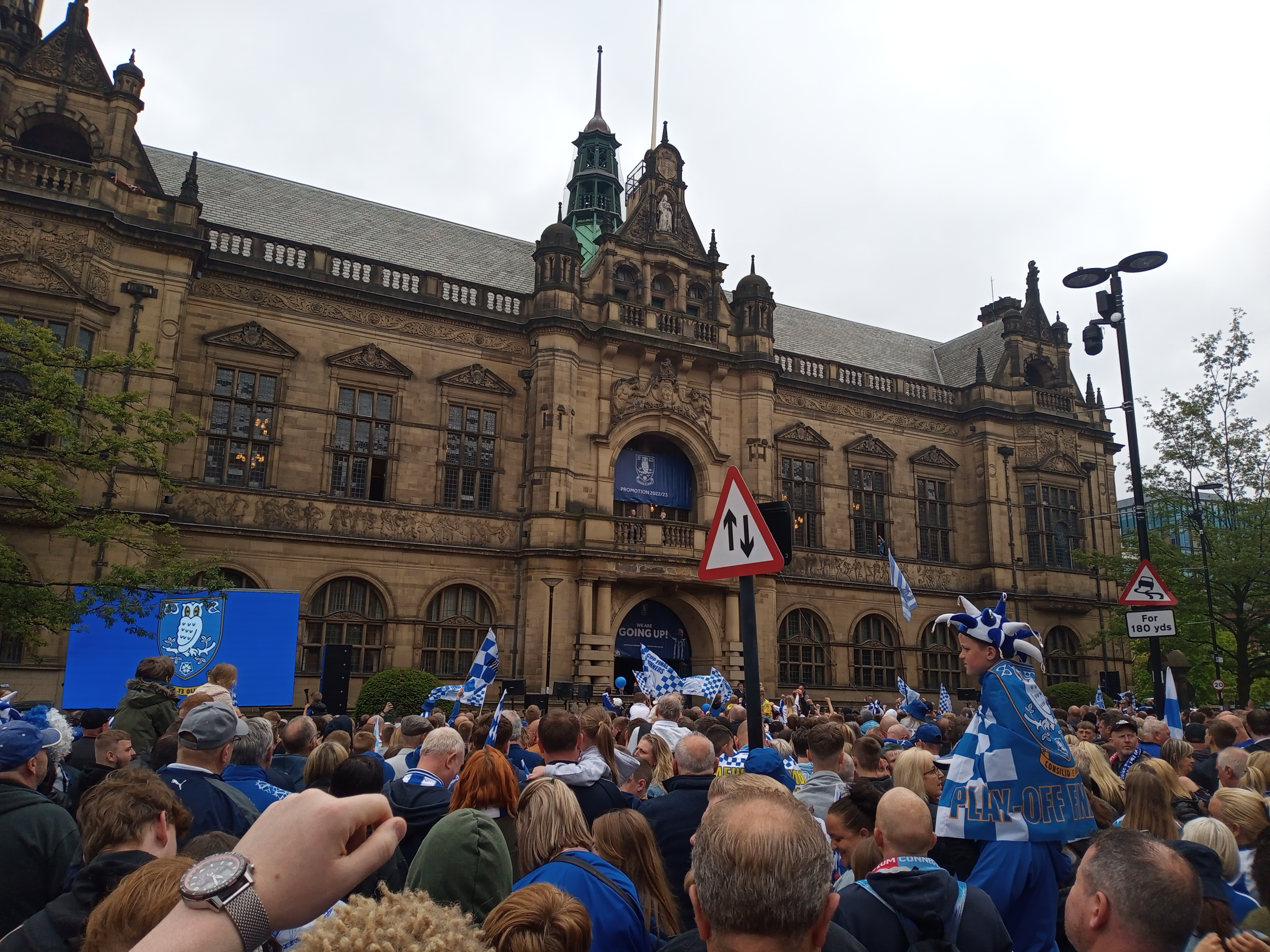
Sheffield Wednesday fans outside Sheffield Town Hall celebrating their promotion

Sheffield Wednesday manager Darren Moore described his side's win as "the stuff of dreams". Reflecting on the team's comeback from four goals down in the semi-final and the last-minute winner in the final, Moore commented that "you couldn't write it" and that "the impossible can be achieved". Barnsley manager Michael Duff was proud of his players and described a sense of frustration, saying "it's a cruel game". On the subject of the penalty decision and sending off early in the second half, he stated his belief that Gregory's challenge on Kitching should have been a penalty and that Phillips's challenge merited only a booking. He did, however, compliment Sheffield Wednesday, saying that Moore had done a "brilliant job" and that they were "factually the third best team in the league".

Josh Windass's father, Dean Windass, who had scored a goal under similar circumstances to his son's for Hull City against Bristol City in the 2008 Championship play-off final, emphasised how proud he was, stating "there's no words, there's no words. Wow. I knew he'd score, this morning when I woke up at 5.30 I was nervous and even with his head as well – I can't believe he's headed it."

On 31 May, Sheffield Wednesday hosted a victory parade with an open-top bus to celebrate their promotion, which drove from Devonshire Green to Sheffield Town Hall. Upon arriving at the town hall, the club's players and staff, as well as owner Deijphon Chansiri, thanked the fans for their support.
