= 2022–23 EFL League One =

EFL League One
- Season: 2022–23
- Dates: 30 July 2022 – 7 May 2023
- Champions: Plymouth Argyle
- Promoted: Plymouth Argyle; Ipswich Town; Sheffield Wednesday
- Relegated: Milton Keynes Dons; Morecambe; Accrington Stanley; Forest Green Rovers
- Matches: 552
- Goals: 1,414 (2.56 per match)
- Top goalscorer: Conor Chaplin (Ipswich Town); Jonson Clarke-Harris (Peterborough United) (26 goals)
- Biggest home win: Charlton Athletic 6–0 Shrewsbury Town (1 April 2023); Ipswich Town 6–0 Charlton Athletic (15 April 2023); Ipswich Town 6–0 Exeter City (29 April 2023)
- Biggest away win: Peterborough United 0–5 Bolton Wanderers (11 February 2023)
- Highest scoring: Bristol Rovers 3–6 Lincoln City (17 September 2022)
- Longest winning run: Ipswich Town (8 games)
- Longest unbeaten run: Sheffield Wednesday (23 games)
- Longest winless run: Oxford United (17 games)
- Longest losing run: Oxford United (5 games)
- Highest attendance: 33,442; Sheffield Wednesday 1–0 Plymouth Argyle (4 February 2023)
- Lowest attendance: 1,716; Forest Green Rovers 0–0 Fleetwood Town (18 April 2023)
- Total attendance: 5,549,346
- Average attendance: 10,550
- All statistics correct as of 7 May 2023.

The 2022–23 EFL League One (referred to as the Sky Bet League One for sponsorship reasons) was the 19th season of the Football League One under its current title and the 31st season under its current league division format. The season began on 30 July 2022 and concluded on 7 May 2023.

== Team changes ==
The following teams have changed division since the 2021–22 season:

=== To League One ===
Promoted from League Two

- Forest Green Rovers
- Exeter City
- Bristol Rovers
- Port Vale

Relegated from the Championship

- Peterborough United
- Derby County
- Barnsley

=== From League One ===
Promoted to the Championship

- Wigan Athletic
- Rotherham United
- Sunderland

Relegated to League Two

- Gillingham
- Doncaster Rovers
- AFC Wimbledon
- Crewe Alexandra

== Stadiums ==
Locations of the 2022–23 EFL League One teams

| Team | Location | Stadium | Capacity |
|---|---|---|---|
| Accrington Stanley | Accrington | Crown Ground | 5,450 |
| Barnsley | Barnsley | Oakwell | 23,287 |
| Bolton Wanderers | Horwich | University of Bolton Stadium | 28,723 |
| Bristol Rovers | Bristol | Memorial Stadium | 9,832 |
| Burton Albion | Burton upon Trent | Pirelli Stadium | 6,912 |
| Cambridge United | Cambridge | Abbey Stadium | 8,127 |
| Charlton Athletic | London (Charlton) | The Valley | 27,111 |
| Cheltenham Town | Cheltenham | Whaddon Road | 7,066 |
| Derby County | Derby | Pride Park Stadium | 32,956 |
| Exeter City | Exeter | St. James Park | 8,720 |
| Fleetwood Town | Fleetwood | Highbury Stadium | 5,327 |
| Forest Green Rovers | Nailsworth | The New Lawn | 5,147 |
| Ipswich Town | Ipswich | Portman Road | 30,311 |
| Lincoln City | Lincoln | Sincil Bank | 10,780 |
| Milton Keynes Dons | Milton Keynes | Stadium MK | 30,500 |
| Morecambe | Morecambe | Mazuma Stadium | 6,476 |
| Oxford United | Oxford | Kassam Stadium | 12,500 |
| Peterborough United | Peterborough | London Road | 15,314 |
| Plymouth Argyle | Plymouth | Home Park | 17,300 |
| Portsmouth | Portsmouth | Fratton Park | 20,620 |
| Port Vale | Burslem | Vale Park | 15,036 |
| Sheffield Wednesday | Sheffield | Hillsborough Stadium | 34,835 |
| Shrewsbury Town | Shrewsbury | New Meadow | 9,875 |
| Wycombe Wanderers | High Wycombe | Adams Park | 10,137 |

== Personnel and sponsoring ==
| Team | Manager | Captain | Kit manufacturer | Sponsor |
|---|---|---|---|---|
| Accrington Stanley | (England) John Coleman | (Republic of Ireland) Séamus Conneely | (Germany) Adidas | Wham |
| Barnsley | (Northern Ireland) Michael Duff | (Denmark) Mads Andersen | (Germany) Puma | Various local companies and charities^{1} |
| Bolton Wanderers | (England) Ian Evatt | (Portugal) Ricardo Santos | (Italy) Macron | ServiceMyCar.com |
| Bristol Rovers | (England) Joey Barton | (Scotland) Paul Coutts | (Italy) Macron | Utilita |
| Burton Albion | (Tunisia) Dino Maamria | (England) John Brayford | (England) TAG | Prestec UK Ltd |
| Cambridge United | (England) Mark Bonner | (England) Greg Taylor | (Denmark) Hummel | Mick George Group |
| Charlton Athletic | (England) Dean Holden | (England) George Dobson | (England) Castore | RSK Group (Home); University of Greenwich (Away) |
| Cheltenham Town | (England) Wade Elliott | (Republic of Ireland) Sean Long | (Italy) Erreà | Mira Showers |
| Derby County | (England) Paul Warne | (England) Curtis Davies | (England) Umbro | NSPCC^{2} |
| Exeter City | (Scotland) Gary Caldwell | (Republic of Ireland) Pierce Sweeney | (Spain) Joma | Carpetright |
| Fleetwood Town | (Scotland) Scott Brown | (England) Josh Vela | (Denmark) Hummel | BES Utilities |
| Forest Green Rovers | (Scotland) Duncan Ferguson | (England) Baily Cargill | (England) PlayerLayer | Ecotricity |
| Ipswich Town | (Northern Ireland) Kieran McKenna | (Egypt) Sam Morsy | (England) Umbro | Ed Sheeran |
| Lincoln City | (Republic of Ireland) Mark Kennedy | (Wales) Regan Poole | (Italy) Erreà | Branston |
| Milton Keynes Dons | (England) Mark Jackson | (England) Dean Lewington | (England) Castore | Suzuki |
| Morecambe | (Scotland) Derek Adams | (Scotland) Donald Love | (Spain) Joma | Mazuma |
| Oxford United | (England) Liam Manning | (England) Sam Long (England) Cameron Brannagan | (Italy) Macron | Bangkok Glass |
| Peterborough United | (Scotland) Darren Ferguson | (Jamaica) Jonson Clarke-Harris | (Germany) Puma | Mick George Group |
| Plymouth Argyle | (England) Steven Schumacher | (England) Joe Edwards | (Germany) Puma | Project 35 |
| Portsmouth | (England) John Mousinho | (Scotland) Clark Robertson | (United States) Nike | University of Portsmouth |
| Port Vale | (England) Andy Crosby (interim) | (England) Tom Conlon | (Italy) Erreà | Synectics Solutions |
| Sheffield Wednesday | (Jamaica) Darren Moore | (Scotland) Barry Bannan | (Italy) Macron | Host & Stay Limited |
| Shrewsbury Town | (England) Steve Cotterill | (England) Luke Leahy | (England) Umbro | Tuffins Supermarkets (Home); Shropshire Homes (Away) |
| Wycombe Wanderers | (England) Matt Bloomfield | (Wales) Joe Jacobson | (Republic of Ireland) O'Neills | Dreams (Home and Away); Cherry Red Records (Third) |

1. Barnsley's shirt sponsor was HEX.com until 12 August 2022 when the deal was ended prematurely. The club subsequently announced that various local companies and charities would feature on the shirt throughout the season.
1. Derby County had no shirt sponsor until 8 November 2022 when they gifted shirt sponsorship to the charity NSPCC.

== Managerial changes ==
| Team | Outgoing manager | Manner of departure | Date of vacancy | Position in the table | Incoming manager | Date of appointment |
|---|---|---|---|---|---|---|
| Lincoln City | (England) Michael Appleton | Mutual consent | 30 April 2022 | Pre-season | (Republic of Ireland) Mark Kennedy | 12 May 2022 |
| Charlton Athletic | (England) Johnnie Jackson | Sacked | 3 May 2022 | Pre-season | (England) Ben Garner | 8 June 2022 |
| Fleetwood Town | (Scotland) Stephen Crainey | Return to Under-23s Coaching Role | 4 May 2022 | Pre-season | (Scotland) Scott Brown | 12 May 2022 |
| Barnsley | (Republic of Ireland) Martin Devaney | End of interim spell | 8 May 2022 | Pre-season | (Northern Ireland) Michael Duff | 15 June 2022 |
| Forest Green Rovers | (Wales) Rob Edwards | Signed by Watford | 11 May 2022 | Pre-season | (England) Ian Burchnall | 27 May 2022 |
| Cheltenham Town | (Northern Ireland) Michael Duff | Signed by Barnsley | 13 June 2022 | Pre-season | (England) Wade Elliott | 27 June 2022 |
| Derby County | (England) Wayne Rooney | Resigned | 24 June 2022 | Pre-season | (England) Liam Rosenior (interim) | 26 June 2022 |
| Burton Albion | (Netherlands) Jimmy Floyd Hasselbaink | Resigned | 5 September 2022 | 24th | (Tunisia) Dino Maamria | 6 September 2022 |
| Derby County | (England) Liam Rosenior | End of interim spell | 22 September 2022 | 7th | (England) Paul Warne | 22 September 2022 |
| Exeter City | (England) Matt Taylor | Signed by Rotherham United | 4 October 2022 | 11th | (Scotland) Gary Caldwell | 24 October 2022 |
| Charlton Athletic | (England) Ben Garner | Sacked | 5 December 2022 | 17th | (England) Dean Holden | 20 December 2022 |
| Milton Keynes Dons | (England) Liam Manning | Sacked | 11 December 2022 | 23rd | (England) Mark Jackson | 23 December 2022 |
| Portsmouth | (England) Danny Cowley | Sacked | 2 January 2023 | 12th | (England) John Mousinho | 20 January 2023 |
| Peterborough United | (Northern Ireland) Grant McCann | Sacked | 4 January 2023 | 8th | (Scotland) Darren Ferguson | 4 January 2023 |
| Forest Green Rovers | (England) Ian Burchnall | Sacked | 25 January 2023 | 24th | (Scotland) Duncan Ferguson | 26 January 2023 |
| Wycombe Wanderers | (England) Gareth Ainsworth | Signed by Queens Park Rangers | 21 February 2023 | 7th | (England) Matt Bloomfield | 21 February 2023 |
| Oxford United | (England) Karl Robinson | Sacked | 26 February 2023 | 17th | (England) Liam Manning | 11 March 2023 |
| Port Vale | (England) Darrell Clarke | Sacked | 17 April 2023 | 18th | (England) Andy Crosby (interim) | 17 April 2023 |

== League table ==
| Pos | Team | Pld | W | D | L | GF | GA | GD | Pts | Promotion, qualification or relegation |
|---|---|---|---|---|---|---|---|---|---|---|
| 1 | Plymouth Argyle (C, P) | 46 | 31 | 8 | 7 | 82 | 47 | +35 | 101 | Promotion to EFL Championship |
| 2 | Ipswich Town (P) | 46 | 28 | 14 | 4 | 101 | 35 | +66 | 98 | Promotion to EFL Championship |
| 3 | Sheffield Wednesday (O, P) | 46 | 28 | 12 | 6 | 81 | 37 | +44 | 96 | Qualification for League One play-offs |
| 4 | Barnsley | 46 | 26 | 8 | 12 | 80 | 47 | +33 | 86 | Qualification for League One play-offs |
| 5 | Bolton Wanderers | 46 | 23 | 12 | 11 | 62 | 36 | +26 | 81 | Qualification for League One play-offs |
| 6 | Peterborough United | 46 | 24 | 5 | 17 | 75 | 54 | +21 | 77 | Qualification for League One play-offs |
| 7 | Derby County | 46 | 21 | 13 | 12 | 67 | 46 | +21 | 76 | |
| 8 | Portsmouth | 46 | 17 | 19 | 10 | 61 | 50 | +11 | 70 | |
| 9 | Wycombe Wanderers | 46 | 20 | 9 | 17 | 59 | 51 | +8 | 69 | |
| 10 | Charlton Athletic | 46 | 16 | 14 | 16 | 70 | 66 | +4 | 62 | |
| 11 | Lincoln City | 46 | 14 | 20 | 12 | 47 | 47 | 0 | 62 | |
| 12 | Shrewsbury Town | 46 | 17 | 8 | 21 | 52 | 61 | −9 | 59 | |
| 13 | Fleetwood Town | 46 | 14 | 16 | 16 | 53 | 51 | +2 | 58 | |
| 14 | Exeter City | 46 | 15 | 11 | 20 | 64 | 68 | −4 | 56 | |
| 15 | Burton Albion | 46 | 15 | 11 | 20 | 57 | 79 | −22 | 56 | |
| 16 | Cheltenham Town | 46 | 14 | 12 | 20 | 45 | 61 | −16 | 54 | |
| 17 | Bristol Rovers | 46 | 14 | 11 | 21 | 58 | 73 | −15 | 53 | |
| 18 | Port Vale | 46 | 13 | 10 | 23 | 48 | 71 | −23 | 49 | |
| 19 | Oxford United | 46 | 11 | 14 | 21 | 49 | 56 | −7 | 47 | |
| 20 | Cambridge United | 46 | 13 | 7 | 26 | 41 | 68 | −27 | 46 | |
| 21 | Milton Keynes Dons (R) | 46 | 11 | 12 | 23 | 44 | 66 | −22 | 45 | Relegation to EFL League Two |
| 22 | Morecambe (R) | 46 | 10 | 14 | 22 | 47 | 78 | −31 | 44 | Relegation to EFL League Two |
| 23 | Accrington Stanley (R) | 46 | 11 | 11 | 24 | 40 | 77 | −37 | 44 | Relegation to EFL League Two |
| 24 | Forest Green Rovers (R) | 46 | 6 | 9 | 31 | 31 | 89 | −58 | 27 | Relegation to EFL League Two |

Source: EFL Official Website
Rules for classification: 1) Points; 2) Goal difference; 3) Number of goals scored; 4) Head-to-head results; 5) Wins; 6) Away goals; 7) Penalty points (sec 9.5); 8) 12-point sending off offences
(C) Champions; (O) Play-off winners; (P) Promoted; (R) Relegated

== Play-offs ==
Semi-finals
6 | Peterborough United | 4 | 1 | 5 (3)
3 | Sheffield Wednesday (p) | 0 | 5 | 5 (5)
5 | Bolton Wanderers | 1 | 0 | 1
4 | Barnsley | 1 | 1 | 2

Final
4 | Barnsley | 0
3 | Sheffield Wednesday | 1

First leg

12 May 2023
20:00

| Peterborough United | 4–0 | Sheffield Wednesday |
|---|---|---|
| Taylor 20'; Ward 36'; Poku 50'; Clarke-Harris 82' | Report |

London Road, Peterborough
Attendance: 12,569
Referee: Anthony Backhouse
13 May 2023
15:00

| Bolton Wanderers | 1–1 | Barnsley |
|---|---|---|
| Charles 67' | Report | Cadden 63' |

University of Bolton Stadium, Horwich
Attendance: 23,450
Referee: Andrew Kitchen

Second leg

18 May 2023
20:00

| Sheffield Wednesday | 5–1 (a.e.t.) | Peterborough United |
|---|---|---|
| Smith 9' (pen.); Gregory 25'; James 71'; Palmer 90+8'; Paterson 112' | Report | Gregory 105' (o.g.) |
Penalties
| Smith (penalty scored); Vaulks (penalty scored); Bannan (penalty scored); Windass (penalty scored); Hunt (penalty scored) | 5–3 | (penalty scored) Clarke-Harris; (penalty missed) Butler; (penalty scored) Norburn; (penalty scored) Tshimanga |

Hillsborough, Owlerton
Attendance: 31,835
Referee: David Webb

5–5 on aggregate. Sheffield Wednesday won 5–3 on penalties. Main article: Miracle of Hillsborough

19 May 2023
20:00

| Barnsley | 1–0 | Bolton Wanderers |
|---|---|---|
| Kitching 24' | Report |

Oakwell Stadium, Barnsley
Attendance: 16,274
Referee: Michael Salisbury

Barnsley won 2–1 on aggregate.

=== Final ===
29 May 2023
15:00 BST

| Barnsley | 0–1 (a.e.t.) | Sheffield Wednesday |
|---|---|---|
| | | Windass 120+3' |

Wembley Stadium, London
Attendance: 72,492
Referee: Tim Robinson

== Results ==
| Home \ Away | ACC | BAR | BOL | BRI | BRT | CAM | CHA | CHE | DER | EXE | FLE | FOR | IPS | LIN | MKD | MOR | OXF | PET | PLY | POR | PVL | SHE | SHR | WYC |
|---|---|---|---|---|---|---|---|---|---|---|---|---|---|---|---|---|---|---|---|---|---|---|---|---|
| Accrington Stanley | — | 1–1 | 2–3 | 2–0 | 4–4 | 1–2 | 2–2 | 1–0 | 0–3 | 0–0 | 2–5 | 2–1 | 0–2 | 0–3 | 0–1 | 3–1 | 1–1 | 1–2 | 0–2 | 1–3 | 3–0 | 0–1 | 1–0 | 0–2 |
| Barnsley | 3–1 | — | 0–3 | 3–0 | 2–0 | 2–0 | 3–1 | 1–0 | 4–1 | 0–2 | 2–1 | 2–0 | 0–3 | 0–1 | 3–1 | 5–0 | 2–0 | 0–2 | 3–0 | 3–1 | 1–1 | 4–2 | 2–1 | 0–3 |
| Bolton Wanderers | 0–1 | 0–0 | — | 1–1 | 2–1 | 1–1 | 3–1 | 1–0 | 0–0 | 2–0 | 2–0 | 1–0 | 0–2 | 2–0 | 5–0 | 1–0 | 1–3 | 1–0 | 0–0 | 3–0 | 2–1 | 0–2 | 1–0 | 3–0 |
| Bristol Rovers | 0–1 | 0–0 | 2–3 | — | 1–2 | 2–1 | 1–0 | 2–1 | 1–1 | 3–4 | 2–2 | 1–2 | 0–0 | 3–6 | 0–2 | 2–2 | 1–0 | 1–0 | 2–2 | 0–2 | 1–0 | 1–2 | 1–1 | 0–2 |
| Burton Albion | 0–0 | 2–1 | 1–1 | 0–4 | — | 1–0 | 3–3 | 1–0 | 1–1 | 1–0 | 0–1 | 3–2 | 0–1 | 3–0 | 0–0 | 1–1 | 2–0 | 2–5 | 2–2 | 0–2 | 0–2 | 3–2 | 0–4 | 2–1 |
| Cambridge United | 0–1 | 0–3 | 0–0 | 1–2 | 4–3 | — | 1–2 | 1–2 | 0–2 | 2–1 | 2–1 | 2–0 | 1–1 | 2–0 | 1–0 | 1–1 | 1–0 | 2–0 | 0–0 | 0–1 | 0–1 | 0–2 | 2–1 | 1–2 |
| Charlton Athletic | 1–1 | 2–0 | 1–2 | 1–2 | 3–2 | 1–1 | — | 0–1 | 1–0 | 4–2 | 1–2 | 1–1 | 4–4 | 2–1 | 0–2 | 2–3 | 1–1 | 1–1 | 5–1 | 3–0 | 3–2 | 0–1 | 6–0 | 1–1 |
| Cheltenham Town | 0–0 | 0–4 | 1–0 | 1–4 | 0–0 | 2–1 | 2–2 | — | 2–3 | 3–1 | 1–0 | 3–1 | 1–1 | 0–0 | 0–0 | 1–0 | 1–2 | 2–3 | 0–1 | 0–2 | 0–0 | 2–2 | 2–0 | 1–0 |
| Derby County | 4–0 | 2–1 | 2–1 | 4–2 | 1–0 | 1–0 | 2–0 | 2–0 | — | 0–0 | 0–2 | 4–0 | 0–2 | 1–1 | 1–1 | 5–0 | 1–0 | 2–1 | 2–3 | 1–1 | 1–2 | 0–0 | 2–2 | 2–1 |
| Exeter City | 5–0 | 3–1 | 0–1 | 2–2 | 0–2 | 2–0 | 1–2 | 0–1 | 1–2 | — | 2–1 | 1–1 | 0–2 | 2–1 | 1–0 | 3–2 | 2–4 | 3–2 | 0–1 | 0–0 | 4–0 | 1–1 | 0–0 | 3–1 |
| Fleetwood Town | 3–0 | 0–1 | 1–2 | 1–2 | 2–3 | 1–0 | 1–1 | 0–0 | 0–0 | 2–2 | — | 1–1 | 2–2 | 2–1 | 1–0 | 1–0 | 1–2 | 1–0 | 2–1 | 0–2 | 1–1 | 1–2 | 0–1 | 1–1 |
| Forest Green Rovers | 2–1 | 1–5 | 1–0 | 1–3 | 1–2 | 2–1 | 0–1 | 1–0 | 0–2 | 0–4 | 0–0 | — | 1–2 | 1–1 | 1–2 | 1–2 | 0–3 | 0–2 | 0–3 | 0–1 | 1–3 | 1–0 | 0–2 | 0–2 |
| Ipswich Town | 3–0 | 2–2 | 1–1 | 2–0 | 4–0 | 3–0 | 6–0 | 1–1 | 1–0 | 6–0 | 1–1 | 4–0 | — | 0–1 | 3–0 | 4–0 | 3–0 | 2–1 | 1–1 | 3–2 | 2–1 | 2–2 | 2–0 | 4–0 |
| Lincoln City | 1–1 | 0–0 | 1–1 | 1–0 | 0–1 | 0–0 | 0–0 | 2–0 | 2–0 | 1–1 | 2–2 | 1–1 | 1–1 | — | 1–1 | 2–1 | 1–0 | 0–3 | 1–1 | 0–0 | 3–2 | 1–1 | 1–0 | 0–0 |
| Milton Keynes Dons | 1–1 | 4–4 | 0–2 | 0–1 | 1–1 | 1–0 | 0–1 | 2–2 | 1–3 | 0–2 | 1–2 | 1–0 | 0–1 | 0–0 | — | 1–0 | 1–1 | 2–3 | 1–4 | 1–1 | 2–1 | 0–1 | 0–1 | 0–1 |
| Morecambe | 2–0 | 1–0 | 0–0 | 5–1 | 5–0 | 1–2 | 1–4 | 2–1 | 1–1 | 1–1 | 1–1 | 1–1 | 1–2 | 3–2 | 0–4 | — | 1–1 | 0–3 | 1–3 | 1–1 | 1–0 | 0–3 | 0–0 | 1–0 |
| Oxford United | 1–2 | 1–2 | 0–1 | 0–3 | 2–1 | 1–0 | 3–1 | 4–0 | 2–3 | 0–1 | 1–1 | 1–1 | 2–1 | 1–2 | 1–2 | 1–1 | — | 1–2 | 1–3 | 1–1 | 4–0 | 1–1 | 0–1 | 0–1 |
| Peterborough United | 3–1 | 1–2 | 0–5 | 0–0 | 1–1 | 1–0 | 0–0 | 0–3 | 2–0 | 3–1 | 0–1 | 4–1 | 0–3 | 4–0 | 2–0 | 3–0 | 0–0 | — | 5–2 | 2–1 | 3–0 | 2–0 | 2–1 | 0–3 |
| Plymouth Argyle | 3–0 | 1–0 | 2–0 | 2–0 | 1–0 | 3–1 | 2–0 | 4–2 | 2–1 | 4–2 | 0–0 | 2–0 | 2–1 | 0–2 | 3–1 | 2–1 | 1–0 | 2–0 | — | 3–1 | 0–2 | 2–1 | 2–1 | 1–0 |
| Portsmouth | 1–0 | 1–1 | 3–1 | 3–1 | 1–0 | 4–1 | 1–3 | 4–0 | 0–0 | 2–0 | 1–1 | 1–0 | 2–2 | 0–0 | 0–2 | 0–0 | 1–1 | 2–1 | 2–2 | — | 2–2 | 0–1 | 1–1 | 2–2 |
| Port Vale | 1–1 | 1–3 | 0–0 | 2–0 | 2–3 | 0–2 | 1–0 | 2–2 | 1–2 | 1–0 | 2–1 | 2–2 | 2–3 | 1–0 | 1–0 | 1–0 | 0–0 | 0–2 | 1–3 | 0–1 | — | 0–1 | 2–1 | 0–3 |
| Sheffield Wednesday | 3–0 | 0–2 | 1–1 | 1–1 | 4–2 | 5–0 | 1–0 | 3–0 | 1–0 | 2–1 | 1–0 | 5–0 | 2–2 | 1–1 | 5–2 | 3–0 | 0–0 | 1–0 | 1–0 | 3–3 | 2–0 | — | 1–0 | 3–1 |
| Shrewsbury Town | 0–1 | 0–1 | 3–2 | 2–1 | 2–1 | 5–1 | 0–1 | 0–1 | 0–0 | 3–2 | 0–3 | 2–1 | 0–3 | 2–0 | 2–1 | 3–1 | 1–1 | 0–3 | 1–2 | 1–1 | 3–2 | 0–3 | — | 2–0 |
| Wycombe Wanderers | 1–0 | 0–1 | 1–0 | 2–1 | 3–0 | 2–3 | 1–1 | 0–3 | 3–2 | 1–1 | 2–0 | 2–0 | 1–0 | 0–2 | 2–2 | 1–1 | 2–0 | 3–1 | 0–1 | 2–0 | 2–2 | 0–1 | 1–2 | — |

Legend: Blue = home team win; Yellow = draw; Red = away team win.
For upcoming matches, an "a" indicates there is an article about the rivalry between the two participants.

== Season statistics ==
As of 7 May 2023

=== Top scorers ===
| Rank | Player | Club | Goals |
|---|---|---|---|
| 1 | (England) Conor Chaplin | Ipswich Town | 26 |
| 1 | (Jamaica) Jonson Clarke-Harris | Peterborough United | 26 |
| 3 | (Republic of Ireland) David McGoldrick | Derby County | 22 |
| 4 | (England) Colby Bishop | Portsmouth | 20 |
| 4 | (England) Alfie May | Cheltenham Town | 20 |
| 6 | (England) Freddie Ladapo | Ipswich Town | 17 |
| 7 | (Northern Ireland) Dion Charles | Bolton Wanderers | 16 |
| 7 | (Wales) Aaron Collins | Bristol Rovers | 16 |
| 7 | (England) Michael Smith | Sheffield Wednesday | 16 |
| 10 | (England) Devante Cole | Barnsley | 15 |
| 10 | (England) Sam Nombe | Exeter City | 15 |
| 10 | (Ghana) Jesurun Rak-Sakyi | Charlton Athletic | 15 |

=== Top assists ===
| Rank | Player | Club | Assists |
|---|---|---|---|
| 1 | (England) Leif Davis | Ipswich Town | 14 |
| 2 | (Scotland) Barry Bannan | Sheffield Wednesday | 13 |
| 3 | (Wales) Wes Burns | Ipswich Town | 11 |
| 3 | (Wales) Aaron Collins | Bristol Rovers | 11 |
| 5 | (Republic of Ireland) Conor Hourihane | Derby County | 10 |
| 6 | (Jamaica) Jevani Brown | Exeter City | 9 |
| 6 | (England) Adam Phillips | Barnsley | 9 |
| 6 | (England) Joe Ward | Peterborough United | 9 |
| 9 | (Republic of Ireland) Finn Azaz | Plymouth Argyle | 8 |
| 9 | (Republic of Ireland) Luca Connell | Barnsley | 8 |
| 9 | (Jamaica) Garath McCleary | Wycombe Wanderers | 8 |
| 9 | (Guatemala) Nathaniel Mendez-Laing | Derby County | 8 |
| 9 | (Ghana) Kwame Poku | Peterborough United | 8 |
| 9 | (Ghana) Jesurun Rak-Sakyi | Charlton Athletic | 8 |

=== Hat-tricks ===
| Player | For | Against | Result | Date | Ref |
|---|---|---|---|---|---|
| (England) Davis Keillor-Dunn | Burton Albion | Accrington Stanley | 4–4 (A) | 13 August 2022 | |
| (England) Sam Smith | Cambridge United | Burton Albion | 4–3 (H) | 27 August 2022 | |
| (England) Jack Diamond | Lincoln City | Bristol Rovers | 3–6 (A) | 17 September 2022 | |
| (Jamaica) Jevani Brown | Exeter City | Forest Green Rovers | 0–4 (A) | 24 September 2022 | |
| (Nigeria) Victor Adeboyejo | Burton Albion | Forest Green Rovers | 3–2 (H) | 1 October 2022 | |
| (Republic of Ireland) David McGoldrick | Derby County | Bristol Rovers | 4–2 (H) | 29 October 2022 | |
| (Republic of Ireland) David McGoldrick | Derby County | Forest Green Rovers | 4–0 (H) | 17 December 2022 | |
| (England) Josh Windass | Sheffield Wednesday | Cambridge United | 5–0 (H) | 2 January 2023 | |
| (Republic of Ireland) David McGoldrick | Derby County | Morecambe | 5–0 (H) | 4 February 2023 | |
| (Northern Ireland) Dion Charles | Bolton Wanderers | Peterborough United | 0–5 (A) | 11 February 2023 | |
| (England) Conor Chaplin | Ipswich Town | Charlton Athletic | 6–0 (H) | 15 April 2023 | |
| (England) Jack Marriott | Fleetwood Town | Accrington Stanley | 2–5 (A) | 15 April 2023 | |
| (England) Michael Smith | Sheffield Wednesday | Shrewsbury Town | 0–3 (A) | 29 April 2023 | |
| (England) Jay Stansfield | Exeter City | Morecambe | 3–2 (H) | 7 May 2023 | |

== Awards ==
=== Monthly ===
| Month | Manager of the Month | | Player of the Month | | Ref. |
|---|---|---|---|---|---|
| August | (England) Danny Cowley | Portsmouth | (Scotland) Liam Palmer | Sheffield Wednesday | |
| September | (England) Steven Schumacher | Plymouth Argyle | (England) Morgan Whittaker | Plymouth Argyle | |
| October | (England) Steven Schumacher | Plymouth Argyle | (Wales) Aaron Collins | Bristol Rovers | |
| November | (Northern Ireland) Michael Duff | Barnsley | (England) Connor Ripley | Morecambe | |
| December | (Northern Ireland) Michael Duff | Barnsley | (England) Conor Chaplin | Ipswich Town | |
| January | (England) Paul Warne | Derby County | (England) Luke Leahy | Shrewsbury Town | |
| February | (Northern Ireland) Michael Duff | Barnsley | (Republic of Ireland) David McGoldrick | Derby County | |
| March | (Northern Ireland) Kieran McKenna | Ipswich Town | (England) Alfie May | Cheltenham Town | |
| April | (Northern Ireland) Kieran McKenna | Ipswich Town | (England) Conor Chaplin | Ipswich Town | |

=== Annual ===
| Award | Winner | Club |
|---|---|---|
| Player of the Season | (Wales) Aaron Collins | Bristol Rovers |
| Young Player of the Season | (England) Bali Mumba | Plymouth Argyle |
| Manager of the Season | (England) Steven Schumacher | Plymouth Argyle |

League One Team of the Season

| Pos. | Player | Club | Ref. |
|---|---|---|---|
| GK | (England) Michael Cooper | Plymouth Argyle | |
| RB | (England) Bali Mumba | Plymouth Argyle | |
| LB | (England) Leif Davis | Ipswich Town | |
| CB | (Denmark) Mads Juel Andersen | Barnsley | |
| CB | (Cape Verde) Ricardo Santos | Bolton Wanderers | |
| CM | (Republic of Ireland) Conor Hourihane | Derby County | |
| CM | (Scotland) Barry Bannan | Sheffield Wednesday | |
| RW | (Wales) Aaron Collins | Bristol Rovers | |
| AM | (Jamaica) Jonson Clarke-Harris | Peterborough United | |
| LW | (England) Conor Chaplin | Ipswich Town | |
| ST | (England) Josh Windass | Sheffield Wednesday | |
| Manager | (England) Steven Schumacher | Plymouth Argyle | |
