= Miracle of Hillsborough =

2023 association football match

Sheffield Wednesday v Peterborough United
Miracle of Hillsborough
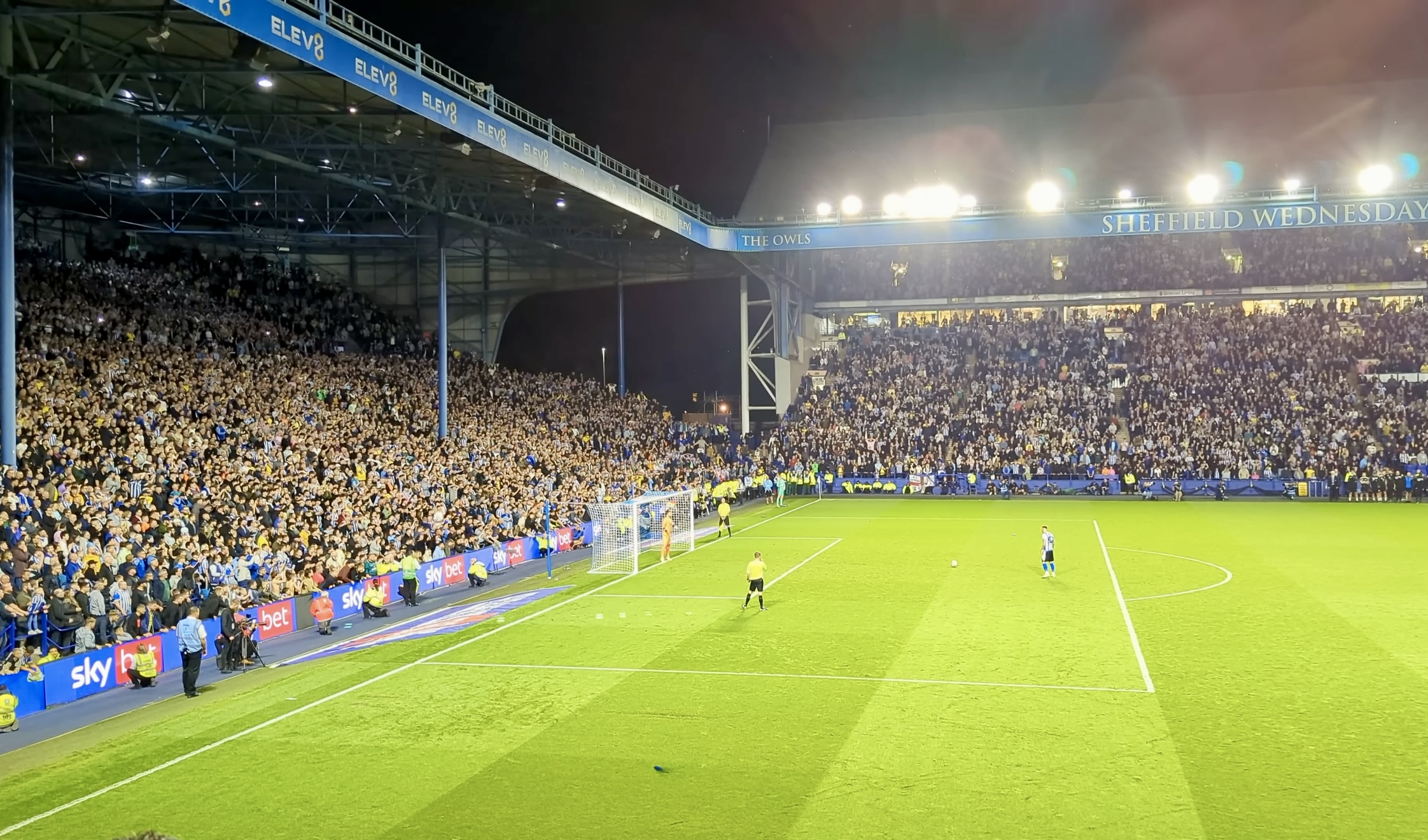
- Jack Hunt steps up to score what will be the winning penalty for Wednesday.
- Event: 2023 English Football League play-offs
Sheffield Wednesday	Peterborough United
5	1
- After extra time 5–5 on aggregate Sheffield Wednesday won 5–3 on penalties
- Date: 18 May 2023
- Venue: Hillsborough Stadium, Sheffield
- Referee: David Webb
- Attendance: 31,835

The Miracle of Hillsborough was an EFL League One play-off game played at Hillsborough Stadium in Owlerton, Sheffield on 18 May 2023, in which Sheffield Wednesday beat Peterborough United 5–1, overcoming a 4–0 deficit in the first leg of the League One play-off semi-finals.

The match has been dubbed as one of the greatest comebacks in English football history, being the greatest deficit overturned in the play-offs.

== Background ==
Following relegation to League One in the 2020–21 season, Sheffield Wednesday were unsuccessful in their first attempt to return to the Championship, finishing 4th and losing to Sunderland in the 2022 play-off semi-finals. It had seemed, however, that Wednesday's luck had turned around following the start of the following season: after being third for 14 consecutive matchdays, Wednesday were able to break into the automatic spots after a 5–0 win against Cambridge United on 2 January 2023, topping the league after a 1–0 win against Plymouth Argyle on 4 February. Wednesday would retain their position in the automatic promotion places throughout February and March 2023, yet would soon see a slip in form after losing to local rivals Barnsley at Oakwell on 21 March, followed by a "shock" 1–0 loss to bottom-of-the-table Forest Green on 26 March and three consecutive draws to Cheltenham Town, Lincoln City and Oxford United respectively. While Wednesday's form would improve towards the end of the season, with the club winning their final four games, Wednesday were ultimately consigned to the play-offs, despite finishing on 96 points.

As for Peterborough, the Posh were able to win promotion to the Championship in the 2020–21 season, but finished 22nd the season after, their relegation confirmed after a 1–0 loss to Nottingham Forest on 23 April 2022. The Posh broke into the top six after a 4–1 win against Forest Green Rovers on 11 October, but fell out of the play-off positions after four consecutive defeats in November and December. As a result, manager Grant McCann was sacked on 4 January and replaced with Darren Ferguson in his fourth stint as Peterborough manager. Ferguson lead the Posh back into the top six after a 0–0 draw with Oxford United on 1 April, but after a 2–0 defeat to rivals Cambridge United on 15 April and a 3–0 defeat at home to Ipswich Town on 22 April, they fell back down to 7th. Peterborough were however able to sneak back into sixth on the final day after Derby county lost 1–0 to Sheffield Wednesday, with Posh beating Barnsley 2–0 at Oakwell. Peterborough's forward Jonson Clarke-Harris was League One's joint-top goalscorer in 2022–23, scoring 26 goals.

EFL League One final table, top 7
Pos	Team	Pld	W	D	L	GF	GA	GD	Pts	Qualification
1	Plymouth Argyle (C, P)	46	31	8	7	82	47	+35	101	Promotion to the 2023–24 EFL C'ship
2	Ipswich Town (P)	46	28	14	4	101	35	+66	98	Promotion to the 2023–24 EFL C'ship
3	Sheffield Wednesday (O, P)	46	28	12	6	81	37	+44	96	Qualified for play-offs
4	Barnsley	46	26	8	12	80	47	+33	86	Qualified for play-offs
5	Bolton Wanderers	46	23	12	11	62	36	+26	81	Qualified for play-offs
6	Peterborough United	46	24	5	17	75	54	+21	77	Qualified for play-offs
7	Derby County	46	21	13	12	67	46	+21	76	

Updated to match(es) played on unknown. Source:
(C) Champions; (O) Play-off winners; (P) Promoted

Despite finishing 19 points behind Wednesday, they went into the first leg with a slightly better head-to-head record against Wednesday that season, with Posh having beaten Wednesday 2–0 at London Road in August, yet losing 1–0 at Hillsborough in March. The first and second legs were the 22nd and 23rd time the clubs had met respectively. Going into the first leg, Wednesday had a better head-to-head record overall, having won 10 of their previous games against Peterborough drawing 4 and losing 7.

This was both Wednesday's and Posh's fifth time appearing in EFL play-off semi finals.

== First leg ==
12 May 2023
20:00

Peterborough United	4–0	Sheffield Wednesday
Taylor 20'; Ward 36'; Poku 50'; Clarke-Harris 82'	Report

London Road, Peterborough
Attendance: 12,569
Referee: Anthony Backhouse

Having finished third, Wednesday were paired with sixth-placed Peterborough United in the first leg of the League One play-offs. The first leg, hosted at London Road Stadium on 12 May 2023, was disastrous for Wednesday. Striker Michael Smith had a chance on goal early in the first half, but his effort was saved by Peterborough goalkeeper Will Norris. Peterborough dominated the game from that point on, with Jack Taylor scoring from just outside the box in the 20th minute, followed by a 36th-minute goal from Joe Ward. In the second half, Kwame Poku and Jonson Clarke-Harris were able to score in the 50th and 82nd minute respectively, the game ending 4–0. Wednesday players were booed from the pitch by their own fans alongside chanting that they were "not fit to wear the shirt". Following the game, Wednesday manager Darren Moore also suffered racist abuse online.

== Second leg preparation ==
Moore was praised for the preparation the Wednesday team endured for the second leg. According to Barry Bannan, the team captain, the Wednesday team "watched comebacks all week from the big teams in the Champions League". Moore himself revealed that the team "worked on penalties every day". Bannan stated that Moore's work helped to "turn around the mindset of the players".

== Match ==
18 May 2023
20:00

Sheffield Wednesday	5–1 (a.e.t.)	Peterborough United
Smith 9' (pen.); Gregory 25'; James 71'; Palmer 90+8'; Paterson 112'	Report	Gregory 105' (o.g.)
Penalties
Smith (penalty scored); Vaulks (penalty scored); Bannan (penalty scored); Windass (penalty scored); Hunt (penalty scored)	5–3	(penalty scored) Clarke-Harris; (penalty missed) Butler; (penalty scored) Norburn; (penalty scored) Tshimanga

Hillsborough Stadium, Sheffield
Attendance: 31,835
Referee: David Webb

5–5 on aggregate. Sheffield Wednesday won 5–3 on penalties.

The match kicked off at 20:00 BST, in front of a Hillsborough crowd of 31,835. Following a foul on Marvin Johnson by Joe Ward just inside the box, Wednesday were awarded a spot kick. Converting the ball into the bottom-right corner, striker Michael Smith was able to score the first goal for Wednesday in the 9th minute. Peterborough were close to levelling soon after, but Cameron Dawson was able to save Poku's low shot. The second goal came for Wednesday in the 25th minute, after Lee Gregory was able to tap a ball from Callum Paterson into the net after goalkeeper Will Norris was out of position.

Peterborough would regain composure by the end of the first half, and were too able to temporarily prevent a third Wednesday goal after Norris was able to save an overhead kick from Gregory early in the second half. Wednesday would eventually break through, however, with left back Reece James scoring his first goal for Wednesday after placing the ball through Norris' legs in the 71st minute. It would take until the 8th minute of stoppage time for Wednesday to find a fourth. Will Vaulks threw the ball into the Peterborough box, which was kicked away by Clarke-Harris. Bannan was able to intercept the ball, passing it to Marvin Johnson, who crossed the ball to Aden Flint. Flint headed the ball across the face of the goal, for right-back Liam Palmer to kick the ball into the net, sending the game into extra-time, making the game 4–4 on aggregate.

Peterborough were able to regain their advantage in the first half of extra time, with a free kick being deflected off Lee Gregory and into the back of Wednesday's net. However, seven minutes into the second half of extra time, Wednesday were able to equalise once more, with Callum Paterson placing the ball into the net after it initially deflected back to him from a Peterborough defender.

The game finished 5–1 after extra time, 5–5 on aggregate. Wednesday were chosen to take penalties first towards the kop end of the stadium, with Smith and Clarke-Harris both converting their penalties. Will Vaulks was able to convert his, but Dan Butler's effort hit the crossbar, giving the advantage to Wednesday. Both Wednesday and Peterborough were able to convert their third and fourth penalties, hence Jack Hunt's successful conversion of his penalty concluded the game as a Wednesday win, with Wednesday progressing to the 2023 EFL League One play-off final.

== Post-match ==
Immediately following Hunt's penalty, Wednesday fans invaded the pitch, as Doris Day's "Que Sera, Sera" played on the public address system. Wednesday were later fined £50,000 for crowd misconduct due to this pitch invasion in February 2024. Darren Moore gave a speech to the Wednesday players following the game, commending the player's for their efforts but reminding them that there was still one more game to play.

Following the game, several outlets commended the game as "the greatest comeback in English football history". It was the first time a team had come back from a four goal deficit in the playoffs at any point in the two legs. Ahead of Manchester City's game against Chelsea on 21 May, City manager Pep Guardiola commented on the game, saying that moments like the game made football "special", and that such a result could only happen in England.

Wednesday would then go on to beat local rivals Barnsley 1–0 in the play-off final at Wembley Stadium, returning to the EFL Championship for the first time since 2021.

To commemorate the first anniversary of the game, the Sky Sports footage of the game was rescreened in the Wednesday Tap on 18 May 2024.
