= Michael Duff (footballer) =

Northern Irish footballer and manager (born 1978)

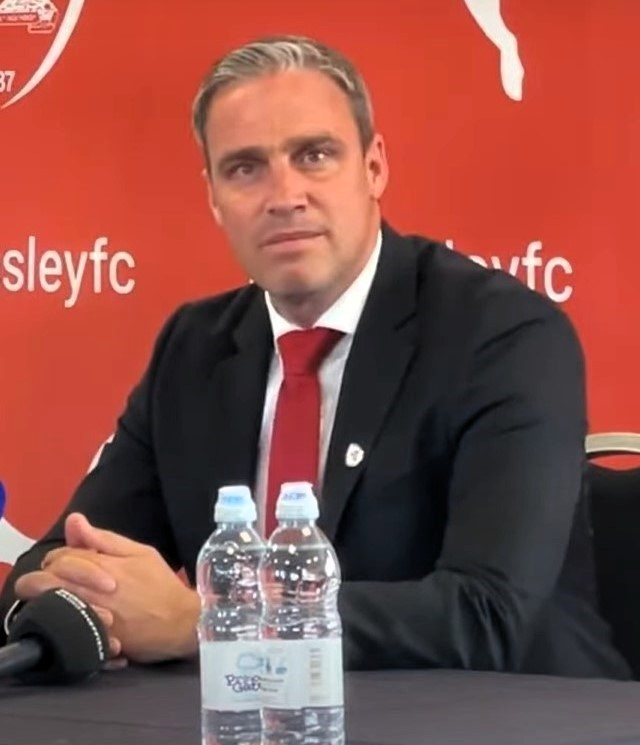
- Duff as manager of Barnsley in 2022

Personal information
- Full name: Michael James Duff
- Date of birth: 11 January 1978 (age 48)
- Place of birth: Belfast, Northern Ireland
- Height: 6 ft 1 in (1.85 m)
- Position: Centre-back

Team information
- Current team: Bradford City (manager)

Youth career
- 1995–1996: Carterton Town

Senior career*
Years	Team	Apps	(Gls)
1996–2004	Cheltenham Town	300	(15)
1996–1997	→ Cirencester Town (loan)		
2004–2016	Burnley	342	(7)
Total		642	(22)

International career
2003	Northern Ireland B	2	(1)
2002–2012	Northern Ireland	24	(0)

Managerial career
- 2018–2022: Cheltenham Town
- 2022–2023: Barnsley
- 2023: Swansea City
- 2024–2025: Huddersfield Town
- 2025–2026: Wycombe Wanderers
- 2026–: Bradford City
- * Club domestic league appearances and goals

Michael James Duff (born 11 January 1978) is a Northern Irish professional football manager and former player who is the manager of League One club Bradford City.

In a professional playing career spanning from 1996 to 2016, in which he made over 600 appearances, Duff played as a defender for Cheltenham Town, Cirencester Town (on loan) and Burnley, winning three Premier League promotions with the latter. He played in each of the top eight tiers of English football in ascending order. At international level, Duff earned 24 caps for Northern Ireland.

After retiring as a player, Duff coached at Burnley's academy before becoming manager of Cheltenham Town in 2018. In 2021, he led Cheltenham to their first automatic promotion from League Two as champions. He was appointed head coach of Barnsley in 2022, leading them to the League One play-off final in his first season. One month later, Duff was named head coach of Swansea City before being dismissed in December 2023. He joined Huddersfield Town a year later before becoming head coach of Wycombe Wanderers in 2025. He was sacked by Wycombe in 2026 and then became the manager of Bradford City.

== Early life ==
Duff was born in Belfast, Northern Ireland, in 1978. He moved with his family to Gibraltar and then Germany due to his father's career in the Royal Air Force. They settled in Bedale, North Yorkshire for six years, where Duff attended secondary school.

As a boy, Duff joined the football academies of Nottingham Forest, Darlington and Swindon Town, but was released from all three due to his short stature. At age 11, Duff witnessed the Hillsborough disaster during the 1989 FA Cup semi-final between Nottingham Forest and Liverpool, which he attended with his father.

== Playing career ==
=== Cheltenham Town ===
At 16 years old, Duff played for Carterton Town and was spotted by Cheltenham Town scout Derek Bragg. Duff attended a trial at Cheltenham before making several appearances for their first team in the Southern League.

Following a loan spell at Cirencester Town, Duff returned to Cheltenham when Steve Cotterill took over as manager. In Duff's first full season at the club, Cheltenham were promoted from the Southern League before winning the FA Trophy at Wembley in 1998. The following year, Duff scored a 93rd-minute winning goal against Yeovil Town to promote Cheltenham to the Football League.

Cheltenham won promotion again in 2002, with Duff playing as a centre-back in the team, having previously played right-back. He was named in the 2001–02 Third Division Team of the Year by the Professional Footballers' Association. On 13 February 2002, Duff earned his first international cap for Northern Ireland, playing the final nine minutes of a 4–1 friendly loss to Poland in Cyprus. Cheltenham were relegated the following season, but were subsequently promoted back to the Third Division.

=== Burnley ===
In 2004, Duff made a £30,000 move to Burnley in the Championship and became a regular starter for the club, spending five consecutive seasons in the Championship. At age 29, he picked up a serious cruciate knee injury against Crystal Palace at Turf Moor during the 2007–08 season. The injury caused him to miss five months of football, but he returned at the end of the season.

The following season, Burnley were promoted to the Premier League after beating Sheffield United in the play-off final. Duff played in the match, which ended Burnley's 33-year absence from the top-flight. After completing his Premier League debut, Duff had played in the top eight tiers of English football.

Burnley were relegated in 2010, but Duff remained with the team. They were promoted again in 2014 before suffering another relegation the following year. Duff retired from playing professionally at the end of the 2015–16 season, aged 38, having helped Burnley win the Championship title and promotion back to the Premier League. As a result, he became the second footballer, after Neil Clement of West Bromwich Albion, to be promoted to the Premier League on three occasions with the same club.

Duff made more than 300 appearances for Burnley. He was capped several times for Northern Ireland as a Burnley player, playing in games such as the 1–0 win over England in 2005 and the 3–2 win over Spain in 2006, before retiring from international football in 2012.

== Managerial career ==
After retiring from playing, Duff coached Burnley's under-18 squad in 2016 before becoming head coach of the under-23 squad in 2017. He also worked with Burnley's first-team, travelling with the squad to several UEFA Europa League matches in 2018.

=== Cheltenham Town ===
"We were good without the ball but couldn't score a goal. I didn't win a game for 10 games! We changed from 4–4–2 to 3–5–2 and we are now completely expansive in terms of our level. There are teams that do try and play football and we are one of them."

— Duff on his tactical switch during his first season at Cheltenham.

On 10 September 2018, Duff was appointed manager of Cheltenham Town in League Two, his first managerial position. His first win was a 6–2 victory over Arsenal's under-21s in the EFL Trophy. In his second season, Duff won the League Two Manager of the Month award for September 2019 and February 2020. He won the award in February after Cheltenham achieved 18 points from 21, with the club sitting in fifth place and four points from automatic promotion.

The following season, Duff's Cheltenham hosted Premier League champions Manchester City in the FA Cup. They led City 1–0 before conceding three goals in the final 10 minutes. The same season, Duff secured Cheltenham's first automatic promotion in the Football League with a 1–1 draw against Carlisle United on 27 April 2021. Duff was named the League Two Manager of the Season and Cheltenham finished the season as champions.

Duff then led the club to their highest-ever finish in the Football League at the end of the 2021–22 season; a 15th-placed finish in League One. In June 2022, after nearly four years at the club, Duff informed Cheltenham that he wished to depart for new opportunities.

=== Barnsley ===
On 15 June 2022, Duff was appointed head coach of recently relegated League One side Barnsley on a three-year deal. Duff won the League One Manager of the Month award for November 2022, with Barnsley winning both of their two league games during the month. He won the award for a second consecutive month after ten points from four matches saw the club rise to fourth in the table.

Duff won the award again in February 2023, with Barnsley having gained 16 points from six matches and remained unbeaten throughout the month. He led the club to the play-off final at the end of the season, losing 1–0 to Sheffield Wednesday in extra time.

=== Swansea City ===
Duff was named head coach of Championship club Swansea City on 22 June 2023. He signed a three-year deal, with Barnsley being paid compensation. His debut on 5 August was a 1–1 draw at home to Birmingham City; Tom Coleman of Walesonline praised him for using different tactics to predecessor Russell Martin. Swansea took three points from a seven-game winless run at the start of the season before defeating Sheffield Wednesday 3–0 at the Swansea.com Stadium on 23 September; this was the first of four wins in a row, followed by one win in eight for the rest of his tenure. The club dismissed Duff on 4 December 2023.

Duff said his Swansea team would play differently to previous managers such as Martin, and said that they would be more physical and fast-paced. Fans of Swansea voiced discontent in Duff not playing to "the Swansea way", the possession-based style of football associated with the club since Roberto Martínez's management in the 2000s. In September 2023, during the poor start to the season, Duff said that fans calling for the reintroduction of "the Swansea way" did not understand how football had changed.

=== Huddersfield Town ===
On 13 May 2024, Duff was appointed head coach of newly relegated EFL League One club Huddersfield Town on a three-year contract. His team went unbeaten for 16 games between October and January, rising from 15th to 4th. On 9 March 2025, Duff was dismissed after a run of four defeats in five matches which saw the Terriers fall out of the play-off positions with ten fixtures to go.

=== Wycombe Wanderers ===
On 18 September 2025, Duff was appointed as the head coach of Wycombe Wanderers, who were 19th in EFL League One after the dismissal of Mike Dodds. He was sacked on 8 September 2026 following a winless start to the season.

=== Bradford City ===
On 6 October 2026, Duff was appointed manager of Bradford City.

== Personal life ==
Duff has two sons with his wife Jess, who is from Cheltenham. He settled his family in the town and remained living there while manager of Barnsley, 150 miles away. Duff played alongside Grant McCann for Cheltenham and Northern Ireland, and is godfather to McCann's son Bayley.

== Career statistics ==
=== Club ===
Appearances and goals by club, season and competition
Club	Season	League			FA Cup		League Cup		Other		Total	
Club	Season	Division	Apps	Goals	Apps	Goals	Apps	Goals	Apps	Goals	Apps	Goals
Cheltenham Town	1996–97	Southern League Premier	17	0	0	0	—		0	0	17	0
Cheltenham Town	1997–98	Football Conference	41	0	5	0	—		0	0	46	0
Cheltenham Town	1998–99	Football Conference	41	3	1	0	—		0	0	42	3
Cheltenham Town	1999–2000	Third Division	31	2	2	0	0	0	2 (Note: Appearance(s) in Football League Trophy)	0	35	2
Cheltenham Town	2000–01	Third Division	39	5	2	0	2	0	1	0	44	5
Cheltenham Town	2001–02	Third Division	45	3	5	0	1	0	5 (Note: Three appearances in Third Division play-offs, two in Football League Trophy)	0	56	3
Cheltenham Town	2002–03	Second Division	44	2	3	0	2	0	2	0	51	2
Cheltenham Town	2003–04	Third Division	42	0	3	0	1	0	0	0	45	0
Cheltenham Town	Total		300	15	21	0	6	0	10	0	337	15
Burnley	2004–05	Championship	42	0	2	0	4	0	—		48	0
Burnley	2005–06	Championship	41	0	1	0	3	1	—		45	1
Burnley	2006–07	Championship	44	2	0	0	1	0	—		45	2
Burnley	2007–08	Championship	8	1	0	0	2	0	—		10	1
Burnley	2008–09	Championship	27	1	3	0	7	0	3 (Note: Appearances in Championship play-offs)	0	40	1
Burnley	2009–10	Premier League	11	0	2	0	1	0	—		14	0
Burnley	2010–11	Championship	28	1	3	0	1	0	—		32	1
Burnley	2011–12	Championship	31	0	0	0	1	0	—		32	0
Burnley	2012–13	Championship	24	1	1	0	3	0	—		28	1
Burnley	2013–14	Championship	41	1	0	0	1	0	—		42	1
Burnley	2014–15	Premier League	21	0	1	0	0	0	—		22	0
Burnley	2015–16	Championship	24	0	0	0	1	0	—		25	0
Burnley	Total		342	7	13	0	25	1	3	0	383	8
Career total			642	22	34	0	31	1	13	0	720	23

=== International ===
Appearances and goals by national team and year
National team	Year	Apps	Goals
Northern Ireland	2002	2	0
Northern Ireland	2004	2	0
Northern Ireland	2005	3	0
Northern Ireland	2006	7	0
Northern Ireland	2007	6	0
Northern Ireland	2008	2	0
Northern Ireland	2012	2	0
Total		24	0

== Managerial statistics ==
As of match played 21 November 2026

Managerial record by team and tenure
Team	From	To	Record					Ref.
Team	From	To	P	W	D	L	Win %	Ref.
Cheltenham Town	10 September 2018	13 June 2022	202	82	59	61	40.6	
Barnsley	15 June 2022	22 June 2023	58	32	9	17	55.2	
Swansea City	22 June 2023	4 December 2023	21	6	6	9	28.6	
Huddersfield Town	13 May 2024	9 March 2025	43	20	7	16	46.5	
Wycombe Wanderers	18 September 2025	8 September 2026	52	20	15	17	38.5	
Bradford City	6 October 2026	Present	9	4	4	1	44.4	
Total			385	164	100	121	42.6	

== Honours ==
=== As a player ===
Cheltenham Town

- Football League Third Division play-offs: 2002
- Football Conference: 1998–99
- FA Trophy: 1997–98

Burnley

- Football League Championship: 2015–16; runner-up: 2013–14; play-offs: 2009

Individual

- PFA Team of the Year: 2001–02 Third Division

=== As a manager ===
Cheltenham Town

- EFL League Two: 2020–21

Individual

- EFL League Two Manager of the Season: 2020–21
- League One Manager of the Month: November 2022, December 2022, February 2023
- EFL League Two Manager of the Month: September 2019, February 2020
