= Ian Burchnall =

English football manager

Personal information
- Full name: Ian David Burchnall
- Date of birth: 11 February 1983 (age 43)
- Place of birth: Leicester, England

Managerial career
- Years: Team
- 2013–2014: Sarpsborg (assistant)
- 2014-2016: Viking (assistant)
- 2017: Viking
- 2018-2020: Östersund
- 2021-2022: Notts County
- 2022-2023: Forest Green Rovers
- 2023: Anderlecht (assistant)
- 2023-2024: Wolves (assistant)
- 2026-: Bristol City (assistant)

Ian David Burchnall (born 11 February 1983) is an English football manager. He holds the UEFA Pro Licence.

== Managerial career ==
Burchnall started his coaching career at the age of 22 at the University of Leeds. He was later part of coaching staffs at Leeds United and Bradford City academies.

=== Sarpsborg 08 ===
In 2012, Burchnall was signed by Norwegian club Sarpsborg 08 as Brian Deane's assistant manager.

=== Viking ===
On 22 October 2014, Burchnall accepted an offer from Viking to become Kjell Jonevret's assistant. Following Jonevret's departure from the club on 14 November 2016, Burchnall was offered the job as the club's new manager. He accepted the offer and signed on 24 November 2016. On 9 November 2017, he was fired from the job due to a run of bad results, culminating in relegation from Eliteserien. The firing sparked anger amongst supporters who set up a petition and created banners of protest against the director of football, Bård Wiggen, and the club due to the turbulent conditions Burchnall had to manage during his tenure. Shortly after, Bård Wiggen left the club.

=== Östersund ===
During his time at Leeds, Burchnall had met Graham Potter, Östersund's former coach. Through this contact, Burchnall became Potter's successor, taking over as head coach in the summer of 2018. In Burchnall's first season as manager he led the team to a 6th-place finish and 49 points, just 1 point and a place below the club record set the year before by Potter. The second season started with a club record return of points after the first 8 games. Despite challenges off the field Burchnall was widely credited with keeping the club in the Allsvenskan ensuring top flight football for the next season. In the summer of 2020 Burchnall stepped down as manager citing personal reasons to return to England and a clear difference in the club's future vision. The supporter club hosted a party to thank Burchnall for his time in Ostersund.

=== Notts County ===
On 25 March 2021, Burchnall was appointed as head coach of National League side Notts County. In his first game in charge, on 27 March 2021, Notts County were beaten by part-time team Hornchurch in the semi-final of the FA Trophy. Burchnall won his first game as Notts County head coach on 2 April 2021, beating fellow National League side Wrexham. During the rest of April, Notts lost 4 of their next 6 games, resulting in the club falling outside of the play-offs. Results improved during May, with Notts winning 5 of their last 8 matches sending the Magpies to a 5th-place league finish.

Notts then faced local rivals Chesterfield in the National League play-off quarter-finals, they came from behind to win the game 3–2 with a late goal from defender Mark Ellis. However, Notts County were eliminated by Torquay United in the semi-finals, 4–2 after extra time.

Notts started the 2021–22 season well, going unbeaten throughout August and most of September, however form quickly changed after both Woking and FC Halifax Town came from behind to beat the Magpies in the closing minutes. This left Notts outside the play-off positions after their opening 10 games. The season ended with defeat in the play-offs, losing in the eliminator round, against Grimsby Town. A 95th-minute equaliser from Grimsby Town forced extra-time where they scored another late goal to win the tie in the 119th minute and end County's season.

=== Forest Green Rovers ===
On 27 May 2022, Burchnall was appointed manager of recently promoted League One side Forest Green Rovers.

On 25 January 2023, Forest Green Rovers parted company with Burchnall leaving the club bottom of League One after having won just five of their league matches.

=== Bristol City ===
On 18 June 2026, Burchnall was announced as the new assistant manager of Championship side Bristol City.

== Managerial Statistics ==
As of match played 24 January 2023

Managerial record by team and tenure
Team	From	To	Record				
Team	From	To	P	W	D	L	Win %
Viking	1 January 2017	18 December 2017	30	6	6	18	20.0
Östersunds	1 July 2018	11 July 2020	58	18	13	27	31.0
Notts County	25 March 2021	26 May 2022	71	36	16	19	50.7
Forest Green	27 May 2022	25 January 2023	37	11	7	19	29.7
Total			196	71	42	83	36.2
