= Jonson Clarke-Harris =

Footballer (born 1994)

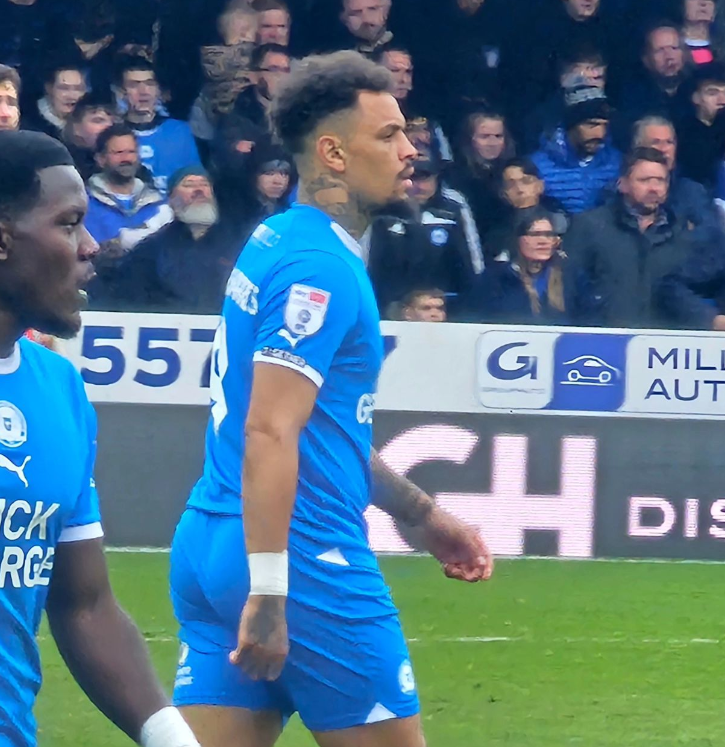

Personal information
- Full name: Jonson Scott Clarke-Harris
- Date of birth: 21 July 1994 (age 32)
- Place of birth: Leicester, England
- Height: 6 ft 0 in (1.83 m)
- Position: Striker

Team information
- Current team: Pendikspor
- Number: 9

Youth career
- Coventry City

Senior career*
| Years | Team | Apps | (Gls) |
| 2010–2012 | Coventry City | 0 | (0) |
| 2012–2013 | Peterborough United | 0 | (0) |
| 2012 | → Southend United (loan) | 3 | (0) |
| 2013 | → Bury (loan) | 12 | (4) |
| 2013–2014 | Oldham Athletic | 45 | (7) |
| 2014–2018 | Rotherham United | 71 | (9) |
| 2015 | → Milton Keynes Dons (loan) | 5 | (0) |
| 2015 | → Doncaster Rovers (loan) | 9 | (1) |
| 2018 | → Coventry City (loan) | 17 | (3) |
| 2018–2019 | Coventry City | 27 | (5) |
| 2019–2020 | Bristol Rovers | 42 | (24) |
| 2020–2024 | Peterborough United | 166 | (78) |
| 2024–2025 | Rotherham United | 29 | (7) |
| 2025– | Pendikspor | 35 | (11) |

International career^{‡}
| 2022– | Jamaica | 1 | (0) |
- * Club domestic league appearances and goals as of 5 May 2026 ‡ National team caps and goals as of 14:10, 30 August 2024 (UTC)

Jonson Scott Clarke-Harris (born 21 July 1994) is a professional footballer who plays as a striker for TFF First League side Pendikspor.

Clarke-Harris set a new record during his first spell at Coventry City when, aged 16 years and 21 days, he made his debut becoming the youngest player ever to play for the Coventry first team. Born in England, he plays for the Jamaica national team.

== Club career ==
=== Coventry City ===
Clarke-Harris made his professional debut as a substitute on 10 August 2010 in a 2–0 League Cup loss to Morecambe, coming on to replace David Bell after 68 minutes, becoming the youngest player to ever appear for Coventry City at the age of 16 years and 20 days. It was confirmed on 30 April 2012 that Clarke-Harris had not been offered a professional contract with Coventry and had left the club. Andy Thorn refused to speculate on why Clarke-Harris had been released but alluded to disciplinary problems.

=== Peterborough United ===
After playing in a reserve match for Blackburn Rovers on 8 May 2012, scoring the only goal of the game. Clarke-Harris signed a two-year contract with Peterborough United on 23 July. Without having made a first team appearance for Peterborough United, he was loaned out on 12 October to Southend United for a month. Still yet to make his first team debut for Peterborough United, Clarke-Harris joined Bury on loan in February 2013.

=== Oldham Athletic ===
Clarke-Harris signed for Oldham Athletic from Peterborough United for an undisclosed fee, agreeing a one-year contract with the club and an option for a further year in the club's favour in May 2013. His first goal for the club was a 25-yard free-kick in a 3–2 defeat to Notts County. On 7 February 2014, Clarke-Harris was rewarded for his continued improvement with an eighteen-month contract extension. Clarke-Harris ended his first season with the club with 8 goals in 49 appearances in all competitions. After many excellent performances throughout his first season, he won the Young Player of the Season award at the end of season awards. Upon receiving the award, Clarke-Harris thanked the fans and everyone at the club for support of his progression during his first season with the club, and he vowed to work even harder and to "continue scoring goals for Oldham Athletic".

=== Rotherham United ===
On 1 September 2014, Rotherham United announced that they had signed Clarke-Harris for a club record fee, rumored to be in the region of £350,000. He scored his first goal for Rotherham with a 25-yard strike that gave them the lead in a 2–1 win over Leeds United. Clarke-Harris then made it 2 in 2 games just a few days later, scoring Rotherham's second goal in a 3–3 draw with Fulham. Inconsistent form within the Rotherham side that season led to him leaving the club on two different loan spells to get some game time. He finished the 2014–15 season for Rotherham with 3 goals in 15 appearances.

In the 2015–16 season, Clarke-Harris failed to make the matchday squad for the first three games of the season. Consequently, manager Steve Evans sanctioned a potential loan move to Colchester United, and in hindsight said that Clarke-Harris' Rotherham career was nearly over. However, he made his first appearance of the season in a 0–0 draw with Preston North End, coming on as a substitute. His impressive performance led to him starting the following game against Queens Park Rangers, where he scored Rotherham's first goal in a 4–2 defeat. He also started the next league game against Fulham, scoring Rotherham's only goal in a 3–1 defeat.

Clarke-Harris missed the majority of the 2016–17 season after suffering a cruciate ligament injury in his first pre-season friendly, however he returned to the team to finish the season strongly and signed a new one-year contract with the club on 9 May 2017.

On 16 January 2015, Clarke-Harris signed on loan for Milton Keynes Dons on a short one-month deal until 21 February 2015. He made five appearances without scoring during his loan spell at the club.

On 12 March 2015, Clarke-Harris signed for Doncaster Rovers on a youth loan. He made 8 appearances and scored one goal.

=== Return to Coventry City ===
On 31 January 2018, Clarke-Harris re-signed for Coventry City on loan to the end of the season with a view to a permanent transfer.

After scoring four goals in 21 appearances in the during his loan spell, aiding the club to promotion to League One via the play-offs, Clarke-Harris signed a two-year contract to join the Sky Blues on a permanent deal.

=== Bristol Rovers ===
On 31 January 2019, Clarke-Harris signed for Bristol Rovers. He came off the bench on 2 February in a 2–1 away victory over Southend United, replacing Gavin Reilly in the 52 minute to make his debut. He scored his first goal in his first start in a 1–1 away draw with Portsmouth, opening the scoring with a 37-minute penalty before missing another penalty later in the match. On 2 March, Clarke-Harris scored a hat trick in a 4–0 home victory over Blackpool. On 12 April 2019, Clarke-Harris was named League One Player of the Month for March 2019, after he scored 8 goals in the month to help the Gas in their battle to beat the drop. One of the goals scored in April by Clarke-Harris was a 25-yard screamer in a 2–2 draw with relegation-rivals Plymouth Argyle, a goal that saw him also pick up the league's Goal of the Month award. His goal in March against Gillingham also won the club's goal of the season award.

Clarke-Harris won his second player of the month award in September 2019, scoring five goals in five matches including an impressive overhead kick in a 3–3 draw with Accrington Stanley. In what turned out to be his last match for the club, Clarke-Harris scored a double as Rovers shocked promotion-chasing Sunderland before the premature end to the season.

=== Return to Peterborough United ===
In summer of 2020, with just a year remaining on his Rovers contract, Clarke-Harris opted against signing an extension and on 27 August 2020, rejoined Peterborough United on a four-year deal for £1.4 million. He scored his first goals back for the club with a double in a 3–1 victory over Swindon Town on 3 October 2020. On 12 December 2020, Clarke-Harris scored a hat-trick in the first 22 minutes of a 4–1 victory over Rochdale, taking his tally for the season to 11, making him the top scorer of the league. After scoring in every match he played, Clarke-Harris was awarded with the league's Player of the Month award for February 2021. On 27 March he scored his second hat-trick of the season in a 7–0 thrashing of Accrington Stanley.

On 29 April 2021, Clarke-Harris was awarded the League One Player of the Year Award, and was named in the 2020–21 EFL League One Team of the Season at the EFL Awards evening. Two days after receiving the award, Clarke-Harris scored a double as Peterborough came from 3–0 down to draw 3–3 with Lincoln City. Needing only a point to secure promotion, his dramatic 96th minute penalty confirmed Peterborough's promotion to the Championship. Clarke-Harris' 31 league goals for the season saw him win the League One Golden Boot for the 2020–21 season. He was also awarded the club's Player of the Year and Players' Player of the Year awards.

The 2021–22 season saw Peterborough relegated back to League One with a 1–0 home defeat to Nottingham Forest with two matches left to play confirming their fate. Clarke-Harris struggled for form for a lot of the season, a change of manager in February seeing Grant McCann replace Darren Ferguson and an upturn in form for both club and player, Clarke-Harris scoring seven goals in his last thirteen league matches.

In July 2022, Clarke-Harris was named club captain ahead of the 2022–23 season, having already been given the armband for the latter part of the previous season following McCann's arrival. A successful individual season saw the striker nominated for League One Player of the Season, as well as jointly winning the golden boot with Conor Chaplin and being named in the team of the season. Following defeat in the play-offs, he was transfer listed at the end of the season.

On 1 September 2023, it was reported that Clarke-Harris' former club Bristol Rovers had agreed a deal worth £800,000 for the return of the striker. With the relevant paperwork not being filed by the 11pm deadline however, the proposed transfer fell through. Following the failure to complete a transfer away from the club, he was used sparingly across the first-half of the season. In the January transfer window, Clarke-Harris seemed set to join Charlton Athletic, however he was unable to agree personal terms following a £500,000 transfer fee being agreed. Following defeat in the play-off semi-finals for the second consecutive season, the club announced Clarke-Harris would depart the club upon the expiration of his contract. Manager Darren Ferguson paid tribute to the striker's professionalism across the season, despite having had limited first-team opportunities.

=== Return to Rotherham United ===
On 15 May, it was confirmed that he would be returning to Rotherham United on a two-year deal.

On 4 July 2025, Clarke-Harris terminated his contract by mutual consent.

=== Pendikspor ===
On 9 July 2025, Clarke-Harris joined TFF First League club Pendikspor on a two-year deal.

== International career ==
Born in England, Clarke-Harris is of Jamaican descent. He was called up to represent the Jamaica national team in May 2022. He made his debut in a 6–0 friendly defeat to Catalonia on 25 May.

== Personal life ==
In September 2021, Clarke-Harris was handed a four-match ban and a fine of £5,300 over tweets made between 2012 and 2013 that made reference to sexual orientation.

== Career statistics ==
=== Club ===
As of end of 2024–25 season

Appearances and goals by club, season and competition
| Club | Season | League | | | FA Cup | | League Cup | | Other | | Total | |
| Club | Season | Division | Apps | Goals | Apps | Goals | Apps | Goals | Apps | Goals | Apps | Goals |
|---|---|---|---|---|---|---|---|---|---|---|---|---|
| Coventry City | 2010–11 | Championship | 0 | 0 | 0 | 0 | 1 | 0 | — | | 1 | 0 |
| Coventry City | 2011–12 | Championship | 0 | 0 | 0 | 0 | 0 | 0 | — | | 0 | 0 |
| Peterborough United | 2012–13 | Championship | 0 | 0 | 0 | 0 | 0 | 0 | 0 | 0 | 0 | 0 |
| Southend United (loan) | 2012–13 | League Two | 3 | 0 | 0 | 0 | 0 | 0 | 0 | 0 | 3 | 0 |
| Bury (loan) | 2012–13 | League One | 12 | 4 | 0 | 0 | 0 | 0 | 0 | 0 | 12 | 4 |
| Oldham Athletic | 2013–14 | League One | 40 | 6 | 5 | 1 | 1 | 0 | 3 (Note: Appearances in Football League Trophy) | 1 | 49 | 9 |
| Oldham Athletic | 2014–15 | League One | 5 | 1 | 0 | 0 | 1 | 0 | 0 | 0 | 6 | 1 |
| Oldham Athletic | Total | | 45 | 7 | 5 | 1 | 2 | 0 | 3 | 1 | 55 | 10 |
| Rotherham United | 2014–15 | Championship | 15 | 3 | 1 | 0 | 0 | 0 | — | | 16 | 3 |
| Rotherham United | 2015–16 | Championship | 35 | 6 | 1 | 0 | 1 | 0 | — | | 37 | 6 |
| Rotherham United | 2016–17 | Championship | 7 | 0 | 0 | 0 | 0 | 0 | — | | 7 | 0 |
| Rotherham United | 2017–18 | League One | 14 | 0 | 0 | 0 | 2 | 0 | 3 (Note: Appearance(s) in EFL Trophy) | 1 | 19 | 1 |
| Rotherham United | Total | | 71 | 9 | 2 | 0 | 3 | 0 | 3 | 1 | 79 | 10 |
| Milton Keynes Dons (loan) | 2014–15 | League One | 5 | 0 | 0 | 0 | 0 | 0 | 0 | 0 | 5 | 0 |
| Doncaster Rovers (loan) | 2014–15 | League One | 9 | 1 | 0 | 0 | 0 | 0 | 0 | 0 | 9 | 1 |
| Coventry City (loan) | 2017–18 | League Two | 17 | 3 | 1 | 1 | 0 | 0 | 3 (Note: Appearances in League Two play-offs) | 0 | 21 | 4 |
| Coventry City | 2018–19 | League One | 27 | 5 | 1 | 1 | 1 | 0 | 0 | 0 | 29 | 6 |
| Coventry City | Total | | 44 | 8 | 2 | 2 | 2 | 0 | 3 | 0 | 51 | 10 |
| Bristol Rovers | 2018–19 | League One | 16 | 11 | 0 | 0 | 0 | 0 | 1 | 0 | 17 | 11 |
| Bristol Rovers | 2019–20 | League One | 26 | 13 | 5 | 2 | 2 | 1 | 2 | 0 | 32 | 16 |
| Bristol Rovers | Total | | 42 | 24 | 5 | 2 | 2 | 1 | 3 | 0 | 49 | 27 |
| Peterborough United | 2020–21 | League One | 45 | 31 | 1 | 0 | 0 | 0 | 3 | 2 | 49 | 33 |
| Peterborough United | 2021–22 | Championship | 41 | 12 | 3 | 0 | 0 | 0 | – | | 44 | 12 |
| Peterborough United | 2022–23 | League One | 46 | 26 | 2 | 0 | 1 | 0 | 5 (Note: Three appearances and two goals in EFL Trophy, two appearances and one goal in League One play-offs) | 3 | 54 | 29 |
| Peterborough United | 2023–24 | League One | 34 | 9 | 3 | 1 | 2 | 2 | 4 (Note: Three appearances and one goal in EFL Trophy, one appearance in League One play-offs) | 1 | 43 | 13 |
| Peterborough United | Total | | 166 | 78 | 9 | 1 | 3 | 2 | 12 | 6 | 190 | 87 |
| Rotherham United | 2024–25 | League One | 29 | 7 | 0 | 0 | 2 | 0 | 2 | 1 | 33 | 8 |
| Career total | | | 426 | 138 | 23 | 6 | 14 | 3 | 26 | 9 | 489 | 156 |

=== International ===
As of match played 25 May 2022

Appearances and goals by national team and year
| National team | Year | Apps | Goals |
|---|---|---|---|
| Jamaica | 2022 | 1 | 0 |
| Total | | 1 | 0 |

== Honours ==
Milton Keynes Dons

- Football League One runner-up: 2014–15

Coventry City

- EFL League Two play-offs: 2018

Peterborough United

- EFL Trophy: 2023–24
- EFL League One runner-up: 2020–21

Individual

- PFA Team of the Year: 2020–21 League One, 2022–23 League One
- EFL League One Player of the Year: 2020–21
- EFL League One Golden Boot: 2020–21, 2022–23
- EFL League One Player of the Month: March 2019, September 2019, February 2021
- EFL League One Team of the Season: 2020–21, 2022–23
- Football League One Goal of the Month: March 2019
- Bristol Rovers Goal of the Season: 2018–19
- Peterborough United Player of the Year: 2020–21
- Peterborough United Players' Player of the Year: 2020–21
