= 2011–12 Football League =

113th season of the Football League

The Football League
- Season: 2011–12
- Champions: Reading
- Promoted: Reading; Southampton; West Ham United
- Relegated: Hereford United; Macclesfield Town
- New clubs in league: Crawley Town; AFC Wimbledon

The 2011–12 Football League (known as the npower Football League for sponsorship reasons) was the 113th season of the Football League. It began in August 2011 and concluded in May 2012, with the promotion play-off finals. The Football League is contested through three Divisions. The divisions are the Championship, League One and League Two. The winner and the runner-up of the League Championship are automatically promoted to the Premier League and they are joined by the winner of the Championship play-off. The bottom two teams in League Two are relegated to the Conference Premier.

== Promotion and relegation ==
=== From Premier League ===
Relegated to Championship

- Birmingham City
- Blackpool
- West Ham United

=== From Championship ===
Promoted to Premier League

- Queens Park Rangers
- Norwich City
- Swansea City

Relegated to League One

- Preston North End
- Sheffield United
- Scunthorpe United

=== From League One ===
Promoted to Championship

- Brighton & Hove Albion
- Southampton
- Peterborough United

Relegated to League Two

- Dagenham & Redbridge
- Bristol Rovers
- Plymouth Argyle
- Swindon Town

=== From League Two ===
Promoted to League One

- Chesterfield
- Bury
- Wycombe Wanderers
- Stevenage

Relegated to Conference Premier

- Lincoln City
- Stockport County

=== From Conference Premier ===
Promoted to League Two

- Crawley Town
- AFC Wimbledon

== Championship ==
=== Table ===
Pos	Team	Pld	W	D	L	GF	GA	GD	Pts	Promotion or relegation
1	Reading (C, P)	46	27	8	11	69	41	+28	89	Promotion to the Premier League
2	Southampton (P)	46	26	10	10	85	46	+39	88	Promotion to the Premier League
3	West Ham United (O, P)	46	24	14	8	81	48	+33	86	Qualification for Championship play-offs
4	Birmingham City	46	20	16	10	78	51	+27	76	Qualification for Championship play-offs
5	Blackpool	46	20	15	11	79	59	+20	75	Qualification for Championship play-offs
6	Cardiff City	46	19	18	9	66	53	+13	75	Qualification for Championship play-offs
7	Middlesbrough	46	18	16	12	52	51	+1	70	
8	Hull City	46	19	11	16	47	44	+3	68	
9	Leicester City	46	18	12	16	66	55	+11	66	
10	Brighton & Hove Albion	46	17	15	14	52	52	0	66	
11	Watford	46	16	16	14	56	64	−8	64	
12	Derby County	46	18	10	18	50	58	−8	64	
13	Burnley	46	17	11	18	61	58	+3	62	
14	Leeds United	46	17	10	19	65	68	−3	61	
15	Ipswich Town	46	17	10	19	69	77	−8	61	
16	Millwall	46	15	12	19	55	57	−2	57	
17	Crystal Palace	46	13	17	16	46	51	−5	56	
18	Peterborough United	46	13	11	22	67	77	−10	50	
19	Nottingham Forest	46	14	8	24	48	63	−15	50	
20	Bristol City	46	12	13	21	44	68	−24	49	
21	Barnsley	46	13	9	24	49	74	−25	48	
22	Portsmouth (R)	46	13	11	22	50	59	−9	40 (Note: Portsmouth were deducted 10 points for entering administration.)	Relegation to League One
23	Coventry City (R)	46	9	13	24	41	65	−24	40	Relegation to League One
24	Doncaster Rovers (R)	46	8	12	26	43	80	−37	36	Relegation to League One

Updated to match(es) played on 28 April 2012. Source: BBC Sport
Rules for classification: 1) points; 2) goal difference; 3) number of goals scored.
(C) Champions; (O) Play-off winners; (P) Promoted; (R) Relegated

=== Play-offs ===
Semi-finals
3	West Ham United	2	3	5
6	Cardiff City	0	0	0
4	Birmingham City	0	2	2
5	Blackpool	1	2	3

Final
3	West Ham United	2
5	Blackpool	1

=== Results ===
The fixtures for the Championship were released on 17 June 2011. The season kicked off on 5 August 2011 and concluded on 28 April 2012.

Home \ Away	BAR	BIR	BLP	B&HA	BRI	BUR	CAR	COV	CRY	DER	DON	HUL	IPS	LEE	LEI	MID	MIL	NOT	PET	POR	REA	SOU	WAT	WHU
Barnsley		1–3	1–3	0–0	1–2	2–0	0–1	2–0	2–1	3–2	2–0	2–1	3–5	4–1	1–1	1–3	1–3	1–1	1–0	2–0	0–4	0–1	1–1	0–4
Birmingham City	1–1		3–0	0–0	2–2	2–1	1–1	1–0	3–1	2–2	2–1	0–0	2–1	1–0	2–0	3–0	3–0	1–2	1–1	1–0	2–0	0–0	3–0	1–1
Blackpool	1–1	2–2		3–1	5–0	4–0	1–1	2–1	2–1	0–1	2–1	1–1	2–0	1–0	3–3	3–0	1–0	1–2	2–1	1–1	1–0	3–0	0–0	1–4
Brighton & Hove Albion	2–0	1–1	2–2		2–0	0–1	2–2	2–1	1–3	2–0	2–1	0–0	3–0	3–3	1–0	1–1	2–2	1–0	2–0	2–0	0–1	3–0	2–2	0–1
Bristol City	2–0	0–2	1–3	0–1		3–1	1–2	3–1	2–2	1–1	2–1	1–1	0–3	0–3	3–2	0–1	1–0	0–0	1–2	0–0	2–3	2–0	0–2	1–1
Burnley	2–0	1–3	3–1	1–0	1–1		1–1	1–1	1–1	0–0	3–0	1–0	4–0	1–2	1–3	0–2	1–3	5–1	1–1	0–1	0–1	1–1	2–2	2–2
Cardiff City	5–3	1–0	1–3	1–3	3–1	0–0		2–2	2–0	2–0	2–0	0–3	2–2	1–1	0–0	2–3	0–0	1–0	3–1	3–2	3–1	2–1	1–1	0–2
Coventry City	1–0	1–1	2–2	2–0	1–0	1–2	1–1		1–1	2–0	0–2	0–1	2–3	2–1	0–1	3–1	0–1	1–0	2–2	2–0	1–1	2–4	0–0	1–2
Crystal Palace	1–0	1–0	1–1	1–1	1–0	2–0	1–2	2–1		1–1	1–1	0–0	1–1	1–1	1–2	0–1	0–0	0–3	1–0	0–0	0–0	0–2	4–0	2–2
Derby County	1–1	2–1	2–1	0–1	2–1	1–2	0–3	1–0	3–2		3–0	0–2	0–0	1–0	0–1	0–1	3–0	1–0	1–1	3–1	0–1	1–1	1–2	2–1
Doncaster Rovers	2–0	1–3	1–3	1–1	1–1	1–2	0–0	1–1	1–0	1–2		1–1	2–3	0–3	2–1	1–3	0–3	0–1	1–1	3–4	1–1	1–0	0–0	0–1
Hull City	3–1	2–1	0–1	0–0	3–0	2–3	2–1	0–2	0–1	0–1	0–0		2–2	0–0	2–1	2–1	2–0	2–1	1–0	1–0	1–0	0–2	3–2	0–2
Ipswich Town	1–0	1–1	2–2	3–1	3–0	1–0	3–0	3–0	0–1	1–0	2–3	0–1		2–1	1–2	1–1	0–3	1–3	3–2	1–0	2–3	2–5	1–2	5–1
Leeds United	1–2	1–4	0–5	1–2	2–1	2–1	1–1	1–1	3–2	0–2	3–2	4–1	3–1		1–2	0–1	2–0	3–7	4–1	1–0	0–1	0–1	0–2	1–1
Leicester City	1–2	3–1	2–0	1–0	1–2	0–0	2–1	2–0	3–0	4–0	4–0	2–1	1–1	0–1		2–2	0–3	0–0	1–1	1–1	0–2	3–2	2–0	1–2
Middlesbrough	2–0	3–1	2–2	1–0	1–1	0–2	0–2	1–1	0–0	2–0	0–0	1–0	0–0	0–2	0–0		1–1	2–1	1–1	2–2	0–2	2–1	1–0	0–2
Millwall	0–0	0–6	2–2	1–1	1–2	0–1	0–0	3–0	0–1	0–0	3–2	2–0	4–1	0–1	2–1	1–3		2–0	2–2	1–0	1–2	2–3	0–2	0–0
Nottingham Forest	0–0	1–3	0–0	1–1	0–1	0–2	0–1	2–0	0–1	1–2	1–2	0–1	3–2	0–4	2–2	2–0	3–1		0–1	2–0	1–0	0–3	1–1	1–4
Peterborough United	3–4	1–1	3–1	1–2	3–0	2–1	4–3	1–0	2–1	3–2	1–2	0–1	7–1	2–3	1–0	1–1	0–3	0–1		0–3	3–1	1–3	2–2	0–2
Portsmouth	2–0	4–1	1–0	0–1	0–0	1–5	1–1	2–1	2–1	1–2	3–1	2–0	0–1	0–0	1–1	1–3	0–1	3–0	2–3		1–0	1–1	2–0	0–1
Reading	1–2	1–0	3–1	3–0	1–0	1–0	1–2	2–0	2–2	2–2	2–0	0–1	1–0	2–0	3–1	0–0	2–2	1–0	3–2	1–0		1–1	0–2	3–0
Southampton	2–0	4–1	2–2	3–0	0–1	2–0	1–1	4–0	2–0	4–0	2–0	2–1	1–1	3–1	0–2	3–0	1–0	3–2	2–1	2–2	1–3		4–0	1–0
Watford	2–1	2–2	0–2	1–0	2–2	3–2	1–1	0–0	0–2	0–1	4–1	1–1	2–1	1–1	3–2	2–1	2–1	0–1	3–2	2–0	1–2	0–3		0–4
West Ham United	1–0	3–3	4–0	6–0	0–0	1–2	0–1	1–0	0–0	3–1	1–1	2–1	0–1	2–2	3–2	1–1	2–1	2–1	1–0	4–3	2–4	1–1	1–1	

Updated to match(es) played on 28 April 2012. Source: The Football League
Legend: Blue = home team win; Yellow = draw; Red = away team win.

== League One ==
=== Table ===
Pos	Team	Pld	W	D	L	GF	GA	GD	Pts	Promotion, qualification or relegation
1	Charlton Athletic (C, P)	46	30	11	5	82	36	+46	101	Promotion to Football League Championship
2	Sheffield Wednesday (P)	46	28	9	9	81	48	+33	93	Promotion to Football League Championship
3	Sheffield United	46	27	9	10	92	51	+41	90	Qualification for League One play-offs (Note: Four teams play for one spot and promotion to Football League Championship.)
4	Huddersfield Town (O, P)	46	21	18	7	79	47	+32	81	Qualification for League One play-offs
5	Milton Keynes Dons	46	22	14	10	84	47	+37	80	Qualification for League One play-offs
6	Stevenage	46	18	19	9	69	44	+25	73	Qualification for League One play-offs
7	Notts County	46	21	10	15	75	63	+12	73	
8	Carlisle United	46	18	15	13	65	66	−1	69	
9	Brentford	46	18	13	15	63	52	+11	67	
10	Colchester United	46	13	20	13	61	66	−5	59	
11	AFC Bournemouth	46	15	13	18	48	52	−4	58	
12	Tranmere Rovers	46	14	14	18	49	53	−4	56	
13	Hartlepool United	46	14	14	18	50	55	−5	56	
14	Bury	46	15	11	20	60	79	−19	56	
15	Preston North End	46	13	15	18	54	68	−14	54	
16	Oldham Athletic	46	14	12	20	50	66	−16	54	
17	Yeovil Town	46	14	12	20	59	80	−21	54	
18	Scunthorpe United	46	10	22	14	55	59	−4	52	
19	Walsall	46	10	20	16	51	57	−6	50	
20	Leyton Orient	46	13	11	22	48	75	−27	50	
21	Wycombe Wanderers (R)	46	11	10	25	65	88	−23	43	Relegation to Football League Two
22	Chesterfield (R)	46	10	12	24	56	81	−25	42	Relegation to Football League Two
23	Exeter City (R)	46	10	12	24	46	75	−29	42	Relegation to Football League Two
24	Rochdale (R)	46	8	14	24	47	81	−34	38	Relegation to Football League Two

Updated to match(es) played on 5 May 2012. Source: BBC Sport
Rules for classification: 1) Points; 2) Goal difference; 3) Number of goals scored
(C) Champions; (O) Play-off winners; (P) Promoted; (R) Relegated

=== Play-offs ===
Semifinals
3	Sheffield United	0	1	1
6	Stevenage	0	0	0
4	Huddersfield Town	2	1	3
5	Milton Keynes Dons	0	2	2

Final
3	Sheffield United	0 (7)
4	Huddersfield Town (p)	0 (8)

=== Results ===
The fixtures for the League One were released on 17 June 2011. The season kick-off was announced for 6 August 2011, and concluded on 5 May 2012.

Home \ Away	BOU	BRE	BRY	CRL	CHA	CHF	COL	EXE	HAR	HUD	LEY	MKD	NTC	OLD	PNE	ROC	SCU	SHU	SHW	STE	TRA	WAL	WYC	YEO
AFC Bournemouth		1–0	1–2	1–1	0–1	0–3	1–1	2–0	1–2	2–0	1–2	0–1	2–1	0–0	1–0	1–1	2–0	0–2	2–0	1–3	2–1	0–2	2–0	0–0
Brentford	1–1		3–0	4–0	0–1	2–1	1–1	2–0	2–1	0–4	5–0	3–3	0–0	2–0	1–3	2–0	0–0	0–2	1–2	0–1	0–2	0–0	5–2	2–0
Bury	1–0	1–1		0–2	1–2	1–1	4–1	2–0	1–2	3–3	1–1	0–0	2–2	0–0	1–0	2–4	0–0	0–3	2–1	1–2	2–0	2–1	1–4	3–2
Carlisle United	2–1	2–2	4–1		0–1	2–1	1–0	4–1	1–2	2–1	4–1	1–3	0–3	3–3	0–0	2–1	0–0	3–2	3–2	1–0	0–0	1–1	2–2	3–2
Charlton Athletic	3–0	2–0	1–1	4–0		3–1	0–2	2–0	3–2	2–0	2–0	2–1	2–4	1–1	5–2	1–1	2–2	1–0	1–1	2–0	1–1	1–0	2–1	3–0
Chesterfield	1–0	2–3	1–0	4–1	0–4		0–1	0–2	2–3	0–2	0–0	1–1	1–3	1–1	0–2	2–1	1–4	0–1	1–0	1–1	1–0	1–1	4–0	2–2
Colchester United	1–1	2–1	4–1	1–1	0–2	1–2		2–0	1–1	1–1	1–1	1–5	4–2	4–1	3–0	0–0	1–1	1–1	1–1	1–6	4–2	1–0	1–1	2–2
Exeter City	0–2	1–2	3–2	0–0	0–1	2–1	1–1		0–0	0–4	3–0	0–2	1–1	2–0	1–2	3–1	0–0	2–2	2–1	1–1	3–0	4–2	1–3	1–1
Hartlepool United	0–0	0–0	3–0	4–0	0–4	1–2	0–1	2–0		0–0	2–1	1–1	3–0	0–1	0–1	2–0	1–2	0–1	0–1	0–0	0–2	1–1	1–3	0–1
Huddersfield Town	0–1	3–2	1–1	1–1	1–0	1–0	3–2	2–0	1–0		2–2	1–1	2–1	1–0	3–1	2–2	1–0	0–1	0–2	2–1	2–0	1–1	3–0	2–0
Leyton Orient	1–3	2–0	1–0	1–2	1–0	1–1	0–1	3–0	1–1	1–3		0–3	0–3	1–3	2–1	2–1	1–3	1–1	0–1	0–0	0–1	1–1	1–3	2–2
Milton Keynes Dons	2–2	1–2	2–1	1–2	1–1	6–2	1–0	3–0	2–2	1–1	4–1		3–0	5–0	0–1	3–1	0–0	1–0	1–1	1–0	3–0	0–1	4–3	0–1
Notts County	3–1	1–1	2–4	2–0	1–2	1–0	4–1	2–1	3–0	2–2	1–2	1–1		1–0	0–0	2–0	3–2	2–5	1–2	1–0	3–2	2–1	1–1	3–1
Oldham Athletic	1–0	0–2	0–2	2–1	0–1	5–2	1–1	0–0	0–1	1–1	0–1	2–1	3–2		1–1	2–0	1–2	0–2	0–2	1–1	1–0	2–1	2–0	1–2
Preston North End	1–3	1–3	1–1	3–3	2–2	0–0	2–4	1–0	1–0	1–0	0–2	1–1	2–0	3–3		0–1	0–0	2–4	0–2	0–0	2–1	0–0	3–2	4–3
Rochdale	1–0	1–2	3–0	0–0	2–3	1–1	2–2	3–2	1–3	2–2	0–2	1–2	0–1	3–2	1–1		1–0	2–5	0–0	1–5	0–2	3–3	2–1	0–0
Scunthorpe United	1–1	0–0	1–3	1–2	1–1	2–2	1–1	1–0	0–2	2–2	2–3	0–3	0–0	1–2	1–1	1–0		1–1	1–3	1–1	4–2	0–1	4–1	2–1
Sheffield United	2–1	2–0	4–0	1–0	0–2	4–1	3–0	4–4	3–1	0–3	3–1	2–1	2–1	2–3	2–1	3–0	2–1		2–2	2–2	1–1	3–2	3–0	4–0
Sheffield Wednesday	3–0	0–0	4–1	2–1	0–1	3–1	2–0	3–0	2–2	4–4	1–0	3–1	2–1	3–0	2–0	2–0	3–2	1–0		0–1	2–1	2–2	2–0	2–1
Stevenage	2–2	2–1	3–0	1–0	1–0	2–2	0–0	0–0	2–2	2–2	0–1	4–2	0–2	1–0	1–1	4–2	1–2	2–1	5–1		2–1	0–0	1–1	0–0
Tranmere Rovers	0–0	2–2	2–0	1–2	1–1	1–0	0–0	2–0	1–1	1–1	2–0	0–2	1–1	1–0	2–1	0–0	1–1	1–1	1–2	3–0		2–1	2–0	0–0
Walsall	2–2	0–1	2–4	1–1	1–1	3–2	3–1	1–2	0–0	1–1	1–0	0–2	0–1	0–1	1–0	0–0	2–2	3–2	2–1	1–1	0–1		2–0	1–1
Wycombe Wanderers	0–1	0–1	0–2	1–1	1–2	3–2	0–0	3–1	5–0	0–6	4–2	1–1	3–4	2–2	3–4	3–0	1–1	1–0	1–2	0–1	2–1	1–1		2–3
Yeovil Town	1–3	2–1	1–3	0–3	2–3	3–2	3–2	2–2	0–1	0–1	2–2	0–1	1–0	3–1	2–1	3–1	2–2	0–1	2–3	0–6	2–1	2–1	1–0	

Updated to match(es) played on 5 May 2012. Source: The Football League
Legend: Blue = home team win; Yellow = draw; Red = away team win.

== League Two ==
=== Table ===
Pos	Team	Pld	W	D	L	GF	GA	GD	Pts	Promotion, qualification or relegation
1	Swindon Town (C, P)	46	29	6	11	75	32	+43	93	Promotion to Football League One
2	Shrewsbury Town (P)	46	26	10	10	66	41	+25	88	Promotion to Football League One
3	Crawley Town (P)	46	23	15	8	76	54	+22	84	Promotion to Football League One
4	Southend United	46	25	8	13	77	48	+29	83	Qualification for League Two play-offs (Note: Four teams play for one spot and promotion to Football League One.)
5	Torquay United	46	23	12	11	63	50	+13	81	Qualification for League Two play-offs
6	Cheltenham Town	46	23	8	15	66	50	+16	77	Qualification for League Two play-offs
7	Crewe Alexandra (O, P)	46	20	12	14	67	59	+8	72	Qualification for League Two play-offs
8	Gillingham	46	20	10	16	79	62	+17	70	
9	Oxford United	46	17	17	12	59	48	+11	68	
10	Rotherham United	46	18	13	15	67	63	+4	67	
11	Aldershot Town	46	19	9	18	54	52	+2	66	
12	Port Vale	46	20	9	17	68	60	+8	59 (Note: On 9 March Port Vale were deducted ten points for entering administration.)	
13	Bristol Rovers	46	15	12	19	60	70	−10	57	
14	Accrington Stanley	46	14	15	17	54	66	−12	57	
15	Morecambe	46	14	14	18	63	57	+6	56	
16	AFC Wimbledon	46	15	9	22	62	78	−16	54	
17	Burton Albion	46	14	12	20	54	81	−27	54	
18	Bradford City	46	12	14	20	54	59	−5	50	
19	Dagenham & Redbridge	46	14	8	24	50	72	−22	50	
20	Northampton Town	46	12	12	22	56	79	−23	48	
21	Plymouth Argyle	46	10	16	20	47	64	−17	46	
22	Barnet	46	12	10	24	52	79	−27	46	
23	Hereford United (R)	46	10	14	22	50	70	−20	44	Relegation to the Conference Premier
24	Macclesfield Town (R)	46	8	13	25	39	64	−25	37	Relegation to the Conference Premier

Updated to match(es) played on 5 May 2012. Source: BBC Sport
Rules for classification: 1) Points; 2) Goal difference; 3) Number of goals scored
(C) Champions; (O) Play-off winners; (P) Promoted; (R) Relegated

=== Play-offs ===
Semifinals
4	Southend United	0	2	2
7	Crewe Alexandra	1	2	3
5	Torquay United	0	1	1
6	Cheltenham Town	2	2	4

Final
6	Cheltenham Town	0
7	Crewe Alexandra	2

=== Results ===
The fixtures for the League Two were released on 17 June 2011. The season started on 6 August 2011, and is scheduled to conclude on 5 May 2012.

Home \ Away	ACC	WIM	ALD	BAR	BRA	BRR	BRT	CHL	CRA	CRE	D&R	GIL	HER	MAC	MOR	NOR	OXF	PLY	PTV	ROT	SHR	STD	SWI	TOR
Accrington Stanley		2–1	3–2	0–3	1–0	2–1	2–1	0–1	0–1	0–2	3–0	4–3	2–1	4–0	1–1	2–1	0–2	0–4	2–2	1–1	1–1	1–2	0–2	3–1
AFC Wimbledon	0–2		1–2	1–1	3–1	2–3	4–0	4–1	2–5	1–3	2–1	3–1	1–1	2–1	1–1	0–3	0–2	1–2	3–2	1–2	3–1	1–4	1–1	2–0
Aldershot Town	0–0	1–1		4–1	1–0	1–0	2–0	1–0	0–1	3–1	1–1	1–2	1–0	1–2	1–0	0–1	0–3	0–0	1–2	2–2	1–0	2–0	2–1	0–1
Barnet	0–0	4–0	2–1		0–4	2–0	3–6	2–2	1–2	2–0	2–2	2–2	1–1	2–1	0–2	1–2	0–2	2–0	1–3	1–1	1–2	0–3	0–2	0–1
Bradford City	1–1	1–2	1–2	4–2		2–2	1–1	0–1	1–2	3–0	0–1	2–2	1–1	1–0	2–2	2–1	2–1	1–1	1–1	2–3	3–1	2–0	0–0	1–0
Bristol Rovers	5–1	1–0	0–1	0–2	2–1		7–1	1–3	0–0	2–5	2–0	2–2	0–0	0–0	2–1	2–1	0–0	2–3	0–3	5–2	1–0	1–0	1–1	1–2
Burton Albion	0–2	3–2	0–4	1–2	2–2	2–1		0–2	0–0	1–0	1–1	1–0	0–2	1–0	3–2	0–1	1–1	2–1	1–1	1–1	1–1	0–2	2–0	1–4
Cheltenham Town	4–1	0–0	2–0	2–0	3–1	0–2	2–0		3–1	0–1	2–1	0–3	0–0	2–0	1–2	2–2	0–0	2–1	2–0	1–0	0–0	3–0	1–0	0–1
Crawley Town	1–1	1–1	2–2	1–0	3–1	4–1	3–0	4–2		1–1	3–1	1–2	0–3	2–0	1–1	3–1	4–1	2–0	3–2	3–0	2–1	3–0	0–3	0–1
Crewe Alexandra	2–0	3–3	2–2	3–1	1–0	3–0	3–2	1–0	1–1		4–1	1–2	1–0	0–1	0–1	1–1	3–1	3–2	1–1	1–2	1–1	1–3	2–0	0–3
Dagenham & Redbridge	2–1	0–2	2–5	3–0	1–0	4–0	1–1	0–5	1–1	2–1		2–1	0–1	2–0	1–2	0–1	0–1	2–3	1–2	3–2	0–2	2–3	1–0	1–1
Gillingham	1–1	3–4	1–0	3–1	0–0	4–1	3–1	1–0	0–1	3–4	1–2		5–4	2–0	2–0	4–3	1–0	3–0	1–1	0–0	0–1	1–2	3–1	2–0
Hereford United	1–1	2–1	0–2	1–0	2–0	1–2	2–3	1–1	1–1	0–1	1–0	1–6		0–4	0–3	0–0	0–1	1–1	1–2	2–3	0–2	2–3	1–2	3–2
Macclesfield Town	1–1	4–0	0–1	0–0	1–0	0–0	0–2	1–3	2–2	2–2	0–1	0–0	2–2		1–1	3–1	1–1	1–1	2–1	0–0	1–3	0–2	2–0	1–2
Morecambe	1–2	1–2	2–0	0–1	1–1	2–3	2–2	3–1	6–0	1–2	1–2	2–1	0–1	1–0		1–2	0–0	2–2	0–0	3–3	0–1	1–0	0–1	1–2
Northampton Town	0–0	1–0	3–1	1–2	1–3	3–2	2–3	2–3	0–1	1–1	2–1	1–1	1–3	3–2	0–2		2–1	0–0	1–2	1–1	2–7	2–5	1–2	0–0
Oxford United	1–1	1–0	1–1	2–1	1–1	3–0	2–2	1–3	1–1	0–1	2–1	0–0	2–2	1–1	1–2	2–0		5–1	2–1	2–1	2–0	0–2	2–0	2–2
Plymouth Argyle	2–2	0–2	1–0	0–0	1–0	1–1	2–1	1–2	1–1	0–1	0–0	0–1	1–1	2–0	1–1	4–1	1–1		0–2	1–4	1–0	2–2	0–1	1–2
Port Vale	4–1	1–2	4–0	1–2	3–2	1–0	3–0	1–2	2–2	1–1	0–1	2–1	1–0	1–0	0–4	3–0	3–0	1–0		2–0	2–3	2–3	0–2	0–0
Rotherham United	1–0	1–0	2–0	2–2	3–0	0–1	0–1	1–0	1–2	1–1	3–1	3–0	1–0	4–2	3–2	1–1	1–0	1–0	0–1		1–1	0–4	1–2	0–1
Shrewsbury Town	1–0	0–0	1–1	3–2	1–0	1–0	1–0	2–0	2–1	2–0	1–0	2–0	3–1	1–0	2–0	1–1	2–2	1–1	1–0	3–1		2–1	2–1	2–0
Southend United	2–2	2–0	0–1	3–0	0–1	1–1	0–1	4–0	0–0	1–0	1–1	1–0	1–0	2–0	1–1	2–2	2–1	2–0	3–0	0–2	3–0		1–4	4–1
Swindon Town	2–0	2–0	2–0	4–0	0–0	0–0	2–0	1–0	3–0	3–0	4–0	2–0	3–3	1–0	3–0	1–0	1–2	1–0	5–0	3–2	2–1	2–0		2–0
Torquay United	1–0	4–0	1–0	1–0	1–2	2–2	2–2	2–2	1–3	1–1	1–0	2–5	2–0	3–0	1–1	1–0	0–0	3–1	2–1	3–3	1–0	0–0	1–0	

Updated to match(es) played on 5 May 2012. Source: The Football League
Legend: Blue = home team win; Yellow = draw; Red = away team win.

== Managerial changes ==
Team	Outgoing manager	Manner of departure	Date of vacancy	Position in table at time of departure	Incoming manager	Date of appointment	Position in table at time of appointment
Bristol Rovers	Dave Penney	Sacked	7 March 2011	2010–11 season	Paul Buckle	30 May 2011	Pre-season
Swindon Town	Paul Hart	Sacked	28 April 2011	2010–11 season	Paolo di Canio	20 May 2011	Pre-season
Morecambe	Sammy McIlroy	Mutual consent	9 May 2011	Pre-season	Jim Bentley	13 May 2011	Pre-season
Sheffield United	Micky Adams	Sacked	10 May 2011	Pre-season	Danny Wilson	27 May 2011	Pre-season
Barnet	Giuliano Grazioli	End of tenure as caretaker	13 May 2011	Pre-season	Lawrie Sanchez	13 May 2011	Pre-season
West Ham United	Avram Grant	Sacked	15 May 2011	2010–11 season	Sam Allardyce	1 June 2011	Pre-season
Barnsley	Mark Robins	Resigned	15 May 2011	Pre-season	Keith Hill	1 June 2011	Pre-season
Brentford	Nicky Forster	End of contract	19 May 2011	Pre-season	Uwe Rösler	10 June 2011	Pre-season
Torquay United	Paul Buckle	Signed by Bristol Rovers	30 May 2011	Pre-season	Martin Ling	13 June 2011	Pre-season
Cardiff City	Dave Jones	Sacked	30 May 2011	Pre-season	Malky Mackay	17 June 2011	Pre-season
Rochdale	Keith Hill	Signed by Barnsley	1 June 2011	Pre-season	Steve Eyre	13 June 2011	Pre-season
Nottingham Forest	Billy Davies	Sacked	12 June 2011	Pre-season	Steve McClaren	13 June 2011	Pre-season
Birmingham City	Alex McLeish	Signed by Aston Villa	17 June 2011	Pre-season	Chris Hughton	22 June 2011	Pre-season
Watford	Malky Mackay	Signed by Cardiff City	17 June 2011	Pre-season	Sean Dyche	21 June 2011	Pre-season
Bradford City	Peter Jackson	Resigned	25 August 2011	21st	Phil Parkinson	28 August 2011	21st
Plymouth Argyle	Peter Reid	Sacked	18 September 2011	24th	Carl Fletcher	1 November 2011	24th
Doncaster Rovers	Sean O'Driscoll	Sacked	23 September 2011	24th	Dean Saunders	23 September 2011	24th
Nottingham Forest	Steve McClaren	Resigned	2 October 2011	21st	Steve Cotterill	14 October 2011	21st
Bristol City	Keith Millen	Mutual consent	3 October 2011	24th	Derek McInnes	19 October 2011	24th
Portsmouth	Steve Cotterill	Signed by Nottingham Forest	14 October 2011	18th	Michael Appleton	10 November 2011	16th
Leicester City	Sven-Göran Eriksson	Mutual consent	24 October 2011	13th	Nigel Pearson	15 November 2011	12th
Crewe Alexandra	Dario Gradi	Resigned	10 November 2011	18th	Steve Davis	10 November 2011	18th
Northampton Town	Gary Johnson	Mutual consent	14 November 2011	20th	Aidy Boothroyd	30 November 2011	21st
Hull City	Nigel Pearson	Signed by Leicester City	15 November 2011	9th	Nick Barmby	10 January 2012	6th
Hartlepool United	Mick Wadsworth	Sacked	6 December 2011	13th	Neale Cooper	28 December 2011	12th
Preston North End	Phil Brown	Sacked	14 December 2011	10th	Graham Westley	14 January 2012	14th
Rochdale	Steve Eyre	Sacked	19 December 2011	22nd	John Coleman	24 January 2012	23rd
Bristol Rovers	Paul Buckle	Sacked	3 January 2012	19th	Mark McGhee	18 January 2012	18th
Yeovil Town	Terry Skiverton	Appointed as Assistant Manager	9 January 2012	21st	Gary Johnson	9 January 2012	21st
Stevenage	Graham Westley	Signed by Preston North End	14 January 2012	7th	Gary Smith	25 January 2012	6th
Accrington Stanley	John Coleman	Signed by Rochdale	24 January 2012	10th	Paul Cook	13 February 2012	8th
Leeds United	Simon Grayson	Sacked	1 February 2012	10th	Neil Warnock	18 February 2012	11th
Huddersfield Town	Lee Clark	Sacked	15 February 2012	4th	Simon Grayson	20 February 2012	4th
Notts County	Martin Allen	Sacked	18 February 2012	11th	Keith Curle	20 February 2012	11th
Sheffield Wednesday	Gary Megson	Sacked	29 February 2012	3rd	Dave Jones	2 March 2012	3rd
Tranmere Rovers	Les Parry	Sacked	4 March 2012	19th	Ronnie Moore	5 March 2012	19th
Hereford United	Jamie Pitman	Reappointed on Coaching Staff	5 March 2012	21st	Richard O'Kelly	5 March 2012	21st
Burton Albion	Paul Peschisolido	Sacked	17 March 2012	17th	Gary Rowett	10 May 2012	2012–13 season
Macclesfield Town	Gary Simpson	Mutual consent	18 March 2012	21st	Brian Horton	19 March 2012	21st
Rotherham United	Andy Scott	Sacked	19 March 2012	11th	Steve Evans	9 April 2012	10th
Bournemouth	Lee Bradbury	Sacked	25 March 2012	13th	Paul Groves	11 May 2012	2012–13 season
Crawley Town	Steve Evans	Signed by Rotherham United	9 April 2012	4th	Sean O'Driscoll	16 May 2012	2012–13 season
Barnet	Lawrie Sanchez	Sacked	16 April 2012	22nd	Martin Allen	16 April 2012	22nd
Burton Albion	Paul Peschisolido	Sacked	17 March 2012	2011–12 season	Gary Rowett	10 May 2012	Pre-season
Bournemouth	Lee Bradbury	Sacked	25 March 2012	2011–12 season	Paul Groves	11 May 2012	Pre-season
Crawley Town	Steve Evans	Signed by Rotherham United	9 April 2012	2011–12 season	Sean O'Driscoll	16 May 2012	Pre-season
Hull City	Nick Barmby	Sacked	8 May 2012	Pre-season	Steve Bruce	8 June 2012	Pre-season
Gillingham	Andy Hessenthaler	Mutual Consent	8 May 2012	Pre-season	Martin Allen	5 July 2012	Pre-season
Barnet	Martin Allen	End of contract	31 May 2012	Pre-season	Mark Robson	11 June 2012	Pre-season
Birmingham City	Chris Hughton	Signed by Norwich City	7 June 2012	Pre-season	Lee Clark	26 June 2012	Pre-season
Wolverhampton Wanderers	Terry Connor	End of contract	30 June 2012	Pre-season	Ståle Solbakken	1 July 2012	Pre-season
Watford	Sean Dyche	Sacked	6 July 2012	Pre-season	Gianfranco Zola	7 July 2012	Pre-season
Nottingham Forest	Steve Cotterill	Sacked	12 July 2012	Pre-season	Sean O'Driscoll	19 July 2012	Pre-season
Crawley Town	Sean O'Driscoll	Signed by Nottingham Forest	19 July 2012	Pre-season	Richard Barker	7 August 2012	Pre-season
Bury	Richard Barker	Signed by Crawley Town	7 August 2012	Pre-season	Kevin Blackwell	26 September 2012	24th
Coventry City	Andy Thorn	Sacked	26 August 2012	14th	Mark Robins	19 September 2012	23rd
Chesterfield	John Sheridan	Sacked	28 August 2012	18th	Paul Cook	25 October 2012	13th
AFC Wimbledon	Terry Brown	Sacked	19 September 2012	21st	Neal Ardley	10 October 2012	21st
Wycombe Wanderers	Gary Waddock	Sacked	22 September 2012	21st	Gareth Ainsworth	7 November 2012	22nd
Colchester United	John Ward	Sacked	24 September 2012	22nd	Joe Dunne	27 September 2012	22nd
Blackburn Rovers	Steve Kean	Resigned	28 September 2012	3rd	Henning Berg	31 October 2012	5th
Bournemouth	Paul Groves	Sacked	3 October 2012	20th	Eddie Howe	12 October 2012	21st
Bolton Wanderers	Owen Coyle	Sacked	9 October 2012	18th	Dougie Freedman	25 October 2012	16th
Barnet	N/A	N/A	N/A	N/A	Edgar Davids (Note: Davids and Robson each have the title of joint head coach at Barnet.)	12 October 2012	24th
Burnley	Eddie Howe	Signed by Bournemouth	12 October 2012	16th	Sean Dyche	30 October 2012	14th
Ipswich Town	Paul Jewell	Mutual Consent	24 October 2012	24th	Mick McCarthy	1 November 2012	24th
Hartlepool United	Neale Cooper	Resigned	24 October 2012	24th	John Hughes	13 November 2012	24th
Crystal Palace	Dougie Freedman	Signed by Bolton Wanderers	25 October 2012	4th	Ian Holloway	3 November 2012	4th
Accrington Stanley	Paul Cook	Signed by Chesterfield	25 October 2012	16th	Leam Richardson	1 November 2012	12th
Scunthorpe United	Alan Knill	Sacked	29 October 2012	22nd	Brian Laws	29 October 2012	22nd
Blackpool	Ian Holloway	Signed by Crystal Palace	3 November 2012	12th	Michael Appleton	7 November 2012	12th
Portsmouth	Michael Appleton	Signed by Blackpool	7 November 2012	17th	TBA	TBA	TBA
Fleetwood Town	Micky Mellon	Sacked	1 December 2012	7th	Graham Alexander	6 December 2012	7th
Bristol Rovers	Mark McGhee	Sacked	15 December 2012	23rd	John Ward	17 December 2012	23rd
Nottingham Forest	Sean O'Driscoll	Sacked	26 December 2012	8th	Alex McLeish	27 December 2012	8th
Blackburn Rovers	Henning Berg	Sacked	27 December 2012	17th	Michael Appleton	11 January 2013	13th
Barnet	Mark Robson (Note: Davids becomes sole head coach at Barnet.)	Mutual Consent	28 December 2012	21st	N/A	N/A	N/A
Barnsley	Keith Hill	Sacked	29 December 2012	24th	David Flitcroft	13 January 2013	23rd
Plymouth Argyle	Carl Fletcher	Sacked	1 January 2013	20th	John Sheridan	6 January 2013	23rd
Wolverhampton Wanderers	Ståle Solbakken	Sacked	5 January 2013	18th	Dean Saunders	7 January 2013	18th
Doncaster Rovers	Dean Saunders	Signed by Wolverhampton Wanderers	7 January 2013	2nd	Brian Flynn	17 January 2013	2nd
Blackpool	Michael Appleton	Signed by Blackburn Rovers	11 January 2013	14th	Paul Ince	18 February 2013	14th
Bristol City	Derek McInnes	Sacked	12 January 2013	24th	Sean O'Driscoll	14 January 2013	24th
Rochdale	John Coleman	Sacked	21 January 2013	14th	Keith Hill	22 January 2013	14th
Huddersfield Town	Simon Grayson	Sacked	24 January 2013	18th	Mark Robins	14 February 2013	18th
Oldham Athletic	Paul Dickov	Resigned	3 February 2013	20th	TBA	TBA	TBA
Notts County	Keith Curle	Sacked	3 February 2013	10th	TBA	TBA	TBA
Nottingham Forest	Alex McLeish	Mutual Consent	5 February 2013	11th	Billy Davies	7 February 2013	11th
Preston North End	Graham Westley	Sacked	13 February 2013	17th	Simon Grayson	18 February 2013	17th
Coventry City	Mark Robins	Signed by Huddersfield Town	14 February 2013	8th	Paul Dickov	24 February 2013	8th
Swindon Town	Paolo Di Canio	Resigned	18 February 2013	6th	Kevin MacDonald	28 February 2013	6th
Aldershot Town	Dean Holdsworth	Sacked	20 February 2013	20th	Andy Scott	22 February 2013	20th
