= 1982–83 Football League =

84th season of the Football League

The Football League
- Season: 1982–83
- Champions: Liverpool

The 1982–83 season was the 84th completed season of The Football League.

Bob Paisley’s last season as Liverpool manager ended on a high as they topped the First Division with a comfortable lead. Paisley retired as Liverpool manager with a record 21 prizes in nine years. His successor was the club's long-serving coach Joe Fagan. Newly promoted Watford were the shock of the season, finishing in second place in their first season in the top flight.

Manchester City were relegated despite a four-year spending spree totalling around £5million. Swansea City were also relegated after only their second season as a First Division club. They had finished sixth a year earlier and at several stages had topped the league table. Brighton & Hove Albion joined them on the way down.

Queens Park Rangers, Wolverhampton Wanderers and Leicester City won promotion to the First Division. Rotherham United, Burnley and Bolton Wanderers were relegated to the Third Division. It was another blow for Bolton, who had been relegated from the First Division three years earlier.

Charlton Athletic and Wolverhampton Wanderers both came within hours of going bankrupt but were both saved by respective new owners.

Portsmouth's revival continued as they ran away with the Third Division championship, followed closely behind by runners-up Cardiff City and third-placed Huddersfield Town. Newport County finished 4th, their highest post-World War II position in the Football League. Occupying the four relegation places were Reading, Wrexham, Doncaster Rovers and Chesterfield.

Wimbledon were crowned Fourth Division champions. Hull City, Port Vale and Scunthorpe United occupied the other three promotion places. The re-election system went in favour of the bottom four sides in the Fourth Division, all of whom were re-elected for the following season, but had things gone differently then Blackpool could have gone out of the Football League little over a decade after they had been a First Division side.

At the end of the season, Fourth Division strugglers Crewe Alexandra appointed Milan-born ex-Wimbledon manager Dario Gradi as their new manager.

== Final league tables and results ==
The tables and results below are reproduced here in the exact form that they can be found at The Rec.Sport.Soccer Statistics Foundation website, with home and away statistics separated.

During the first five seasons of the league, that is, until the season 1893–94, re-election process concerned the clubs which finished in the bottom four of the league. From the 1894–95 season and until the 1920–21 season the re-election process was required of the clubs which finished in the bottom three of the league. From the 1922–23 season on it was required of the bottom two teams of both Third Division North and Third Division South. Since the Fourth Division was established in the 1958–59 season, the re-election process has concerned the bottom four clubs in that division.

== First Division ==
First Division
- Season: 1982–83
- Champions: Liverpool; 14th English title
- Relegated: Manchester City; Swansea City; Brighton & Hove Albion
- European Cup: Liverpool
- Cup Winners' Cup: Manchester United; Swansea City
- UEFA Cup: Aston Villa; Nottingham Forest; Tottenham Hotspur; Watford
- Matches: 462
- Goals: 1,264 (2.74 per match)
- Top goalscorer: Luther Blissett (27 goals)
- Biggest home win: Watford 8–0 Sunderland (25 September 1982)
- Biggest away win: Notts County 0–6 Ipswich Town (25 September 1982)
- Highest scoring: Luton Town 5–3 Notts County (4 September 1982); Stoke City 4–4 Luton Town (25 September 1982); Watford 8–0 Sunderland (25 September 1982); Watford 5–3 Notts County (12 March 1983)
- Longest winning run: 6 matches Liverpool
- Longest unbeaten run: 19 matches Liverpool
- Longest losing run: 6 matches West Bromwich Albion

Liverpool were dominant throughout Bob Paisley's final season as manager, retaining the league title and winning a third successive League Cup. Paisley, who had won 21 major trophies in nine seasons as manager, handed over the reins to his assistant Joe Fagan.

Second place in the league went to Watford, who took the First Division by storm in their first season at this level. Manchester United won the FA Cup in Ron Atkinson's second season as manager, and also finished third in the league for the second consecutive season. Tottenham Hotspur continued to thrive, finishing fourth and qualifying for the UEFA Cup, although they failed to add any silverware to the FA Cup victories of 1981 and 1982. Nottingham Forest finished fifth and secured a place in the UEFA Cup.

Brighton & Hove Albion, who took Manchester United to a replay in the FA Cup final, went down in bottom place after four seasons in the First Division. Swansea City, who had finished sixth on their First Division debut a year earlier, were unable to maintain their fine form for a second season, and went down in second place from bottom. The final relegation place went to Manchester City, whose 17-year stay in the First Division was ended in the final minutes of the final game of the season, when a Raddy Antic goal gave visitors Luton Town a 1-0 victory and saved them from an immediate return to the Second Division.

For the first time in eight years, there were no English clubs winning European trophies this season.

=== Final table ===
Pos	Team	Pld	W	D	L	GF	GA	GD	Pts	Qualification or relegation
1	Liverpool (C)	42	24	10	8	87	37	+50	82	Qualification for the European Cup first round
2	Watford	42	22	5	15	74	57	+17	71	Qualification for the UEFA Cup first round
3	Manchester United	42	19	13	10	56	38	+18	70	Qualification for the Cup Winners' Cup first round (Note: Manchester United qualified for the European Cup Winners' Cup first round as the 1982–83 FA Cup winners.)
4	Tottenham Hotspur	42	20	9	13	65	50	+15	69	Qualification for the UEFA Cup first round
5	Nottingham Forest	42	20	9	13	62	50	+12	69	Qualification for the UEFA Cup first round
6	Aston Villa	42	21	5	16	62	50	+12	68	Qualification for the UEFA Cup first round
7	Everton	42	18	10	14	66	48	+18	64	
8	West Ham United	42	20	4	18	68	62	+6	64	
9	Ipswich Town	42	15	13	14	64	50	+14	58	
10	Arsenal	42	16	10	16	58	56	+2	58	
11	West Bromwich Albion	42	15	12	15	51	49	+2	57	
12	Southampton	42	15	12	15	54	58	−4	57	
13	Stoke City	42	16	9	17	53	64	−11	57	
14	Norwich City	42	14	12	16	52	58	−6	54	
15	Notts County	42	15	7	20	55	71	−16	52	
16	Sunderland	42	12	14	16	48	61	−13	50	
17	Birmingham City	42	12	14	16	40	55	−15	50	
18	Luton Town	42	12	13	17	65	84	−19	49	
19	Coventry City	42	13	9	20	48	59	−11	48	
20	Manchester City (R)	42	13	8	21	47	70	−23	47	Relegation to the Second Division
21	Swansea City (R)	42	10	11	21	51	69	−18	41	Cup Winners' Cup preliminary round and relegation to the Second Division (Note: Swansea City qualified for the European Cup Winners' Cup preliminary round as the 1983 Welsh Cup winners.)
22	Brighton & Hove Albion (R)	42	9	13	20	38	68	−30	40	Relegation to the Second Division

Source: World Football
Rules for classification: 1) Points; 2) Goal difference; 3) Goals scored
(C) Champions; (R) Relegated

=== Results ===
Home \ Away	ARS	AST	BIR	BHA	COV	EVE	IPS	LIV	LUT	MCI	MUN	NWC	NOT	NTC	SOU	STK	SUN	SWA	TOT	WAT	WBA	WHU
Arsenal		2–1	0–0	3–1	2–1	1–1	2–2	0–2	4–1	3–0	3–0	1–1	0–0	2–0	0–0	3–0	0–1	2–1	2–0	2–4	2–0	2–3
Aston Villa	2–1		1–0	1–0	4–0	2–0	1–1	2–4	4–1	1–1	2–1	3–2	4–1	2–0	2–0	4–0	1–3	2–0	4–0	3–0	1–0	1–0
Birmingham City	2–1	3–0		1–1	1–0	1–0	0–0	0–0	2–3	2–2	1–2	0–4	1–1	3–0	0–2	1–4	2–1	1–1	2–0	1–1	2–1	3–0
Brighton & Hove Albion	1–0	0–0	1–0		1–0	1–2	1–1	2–2	2–4	0–1	1–0	3–0	1–1	0–2	0–1	1–2	3–2	1–1	2–1	1–1	0–0	3–1
Coventry City	0–2	0–0	0–1	2–0		4–2	1–1	0–0	4–2	4–0	3–0	2–0	1–2	1–0	1–0	2–0	1–0	0–0	1–1	0–1	0–1	2–4
Everton	2–3	5–0	0–0	2–2	1–0		1–1	0–5	5–0	2–1	2–0	1–1	3–1	3–0	2–0	3–1	3–1	2–2	3–1	1–0	0–0	2–0
Ipswich Town	0–1	1–2	3–1	2–0	1–1	0–2		1–0	3–0	1–0	1–1	2–3	2–0	0–0	2–1	2–3	4–1	3–1	1–2	3–1	6–1	1–2
Liverpool	3–1	1–1	1–0	3–1	4–0	0–0	1–0		3–3	5–2	0–0	0–2	4–3	5–1	5–0	5–1	1–0	3–0	3–0	3–1	2–0	3–0
Luton Town	2–2	2–1	3–1	5–0	1–2	1–5	1–1	1–3		3–1	1–1	0–1	0–2	5–3	3–3	0–0	1–3	3–1	1–1	1–0	0–0	0–2
Manchester City	2–1	0–1	0–0	1–1	3–2	0–0	0–1	0–4	0–1		1–2	4–1	1–2	0–1	2–0	1–0	2–2	2–1	2–2	1–0	2–1	2–0
Manchester United	0–0	3–1	3–0	1–1	3–0	2–1	3–1	1–1	3–0	2–2		3–0	2–0	4–0	1–1	1–0	0–0	2–1	1–0	2–0	0–0	2–1
Norwich City	3–1	1–0	5–1	2–1	1–1	0–1	0–0	1–0	1–0	1–2	1–1		0–1	1–2	1–1	4–2	2–0	1–0	0–0	3–0	1–3	1–1
Nottingham Forest	3–0	1–2	1–1	4–0	4–2	2–0	2–1	1–0	0–1	3–0	0–3	2–2		2–1	1–2	1–0	0–0	2–1	2–2	2–0	0–0	1–0
Notts County	1–0	4–1	0–0	1–0	5–1	1–0	0–6	1–2	1–1	1–0	3–2	2–2	3–2		1–2	4–0	0–1	0–0	3–0	3–2	2–1	1–2
Southampton	2–2	1–0	0–1	0–0	1–1	3–2	0–1	3–2	2–2	4–1	0–1	4–0	1–1	1–0		1–0	2–0	2–1	1–2	1–4	4–1	3–0
Stoke City	2–1	0–3	1–1	3–0	0–3	1–0	1–0	1–1	4–4	1–0	1–0	1–0	1–0	1–0	1–1		0–1	4–1	2–0	4–0	0–3	5–2
Sunderland	3–0	2–0	1–2	1–1	2–1	2–1	2–3	0–0	1–1	3–2	0–0	4–1	0–1	1–1	1–1	2–2		1–1	0–1	2–2	1–1	1–0
Swansea City	1–2	2–1	0–0	1–2	2–1	0–3	1–1	0–3	2–0	4–1	0–0	4–0	0–3	2–0	3–2	1–1	3–0		2–0	1–3	2–1	1–5
Tottenham Hotspur	5–0	2–0	2–1	2–0	4–0	2–1	3–1	2–0	2–2	1–2	2–0	0–0	4–1	4–2	6–0	4–1	1–1	1–0		0–1	1–1	2–1
Watford	2–1	2–1	2–1	4–1	0–0	2–0	2–1	2–1	5–2	2–0	0–1	2–2	1–3	5–3	2–0	1–0	8–0	2–1	0–1		3–0	2–1
West Bromwich Albion	0–0	1–0	2–0	5–0	2–0	2–2	4–1	0–1	1–0	0–2	3–1	1–0	2–1	2–2	1–0	1–1	3–0	3–3	0–1	1–3		1–2
West Ham United	1–3	2–0	5–0	2–1	0–3	2–0	1–1	3–1	2–3	4–1	3–1	1–0	1–2	2–0	1–1	1–1	2–1	3–2	3–0	2–1	0–1	

Source: Soccerbase
Legend: Blue = home team win; Yellow = draw; Red = away team win.

=== Managerial changes ===
Team	Outgoing manager	Manner of departure	Date of vacancy	Position in table	Incoming manager	Date of appointment
Ipswich Town	(England) Bobby Robson	Signed by England	30 May 1982	Pre-season	(England) Bobby Ferguson	1 June 1982
West Bromwich Albion	(England) Ronnie Allen	Became general manager	1 June 1982	Pre-season	(Scotland) Ron Wylie	1 June 1982
Notts County	(Scotland) Jimmy Sirrel	Became general manager	8 June 1982	Pre-season	(England) Howard Wilkinson	8 June 1982
Brighton & Hove Albion	(England) Mike Bailey	Sacked	6 December 1982	18th	(England) Jimmy Melia	6 December 1982
Manchester City	(England) John Bond	Sacked	3 February 1983	9th	(Scotland) John Benson	3 February 1983

=== Maps ===
Locations of the Football League First Division London teams 1982–1983
Locations of the Football League First Division 1982–1983 teams

== Second Division ==
Second Division
- Season: 1982–83
- Champions: Queens Park Rangers
- Promoted: Queens Park Rangers; Wolverhampton Wanderers; Leicester City
- Relegated: Rotherham United; Burnley; Bolton Wanderers
- Matches: 462
- Goals: 1,244 (2.69 per match)
- Top goalscorer: Gary Lineker (26 goals)

Pos	Team	Pld	W	D	L	GF	GA	GD	Pts	Relegation
1	Queens Park Rangers (C, P)	42	26	7	9	77	36	+41	85	Promotion to the First Division
2	Wolverhampton Wanderers (P)	42	20	15	7	68	44	+24	75	Promotion to the First Division
3	Leicester City (P)	42	20	10	12	72	44	+28	70	Promotion to the First Division
4	Fulham	42	20	9	13	64	47	+17	69	
5	Newcastle United	42	18	13	11	75	53	+22	67	
6	Sheffield Wednesday	42	16	15	11	60	47	+13	63	
7	Oldham Athletic	42	14	19	9	64	47	+17	61	
8	Leeds United	42	13	21	8	51	46	+5	60	
9	Shrewsbury Town	42	15	14	13	48	48	0	59	
10	Barnsley	42	14	15	13	57	55	+2	57	
11	Blackburn Rovers	42	15	12	15	58	58	0	57	
12	Cambridge United	42	13	12	17	42	60	−18	51	
13	Derby County	42	10	19	13	49	58	−9	49	
14	Carlisle United	42	12	12	18	68	70	−2	48	
15	Crystal Palace	42	12	12	18	43	52	−9	48	
16	Middlesbrough	42	11	15	16	46	67	−21	48	
17	Charlton Athletic	42	13	9	20	63	86	−23	48	
18	Chelsea	42	11	14	17	51	61	−10	47	
19	Grimsby Town	42	12	11	19	45	70	−25	47	
20	Rotherham United (R)	42	10	15	17	45	68	−23	45	Relegation to the Third Division
21	Burnley (R)	42	12	8	22	56	66	−10	44	Relegation to the Third Division
22	Bolton Wanderers (R)	42	11	11	20	42	61	−19	44	Relegation to the Third Division

Rules for classification: 1) Points; 2) Goal difference; 3) Goals scored
(C) Champions; (P) Promoted; (R) Relegated

=== Results ===
Home \ Away	BAR	BLB	BOL	BUR	CAM	CRL	CHA	CHE	CRY	DER	FUL	GRI	LEE	LEI	MID	NEW	OLD	QPR	ROT	SHW	SHR	WOL
Barnsley		2–2	3–1	3–0	2–3	2–2	0–0	1–1	3–1	1–1	4–3	4–0	2–1	1–2	2–0	0–5	1–1	0–1	2–1	0–0	2–2	2–1
Blackburn Rovers	1–1		1–1	2–1	3–1	3–2	2–0	3–0	3–0	2–0	0–0	2–1	0–0	3–1	1–1	1–2	2–2	1–3	3–0	2–3	1–0	2–2
Bolton Wanderers	0–2	1–0		3–0	2–0	1–0	4–1	0–1	1–0	0–2	0–1	0–0	1–2	3–1	3–1	3–1	2–3	3–2	2–2	0–2	1–4	0–1
Burnley	3–1	0–1	0–0		2–1	4–1	7–1	3–0	2–1	1–1	1–0	1–1	1–2	2–4	1–1	1–0	1–2	2–1	1–2	4–1	1–2	0–1
Cambridge United	1–1	2–0	0–0	2–0		1–1	3–2	0–1	1–0	0–0	1–0	1–0	0–0	3–1	2–0	1–0	1–4	1–4	2–0	2–2	0–0	2–1
Carlisle United	1–1	3–1	5–0	1–1	2–2		4–1	2–1	4–1	3–0	3–2	2–3	2–2	0–1	1–3	2–0	0–0	1–0	2–2	4–2	2–3	0–2
Charlton Athletic	3–2	3–0	4–1	2–1	2–1	0–0		5–2	2–1	1–1	3–0	0–1	0–1	2–1	2–3	2–0	4–1	1–3	1–5	0–3	0–1	3–3
Chelsea	0–3	2–0	2–1	2–1	6–0	4–2	3–1		0–0	1–3	0–0	5–2	0–0	1–1	0–0	0–2	2–0	0–2	1–1	1–1	1–2	0–0
Crystal Palace	1–1	2–0	3–0	1–0	0–0	2–1	1–1	0–0		4–1	1–1	2–0	1–1	1–0	3–0	0–2	1–0	0–3	1–1	2–0	2–1	3–4
Derby County	1–1	1–2	0–0	2–0	1–1	0–3	1–1	1–0	1–1		1–0	2–0	3–3	0–4	1–1	2–1	2–2	2–0	3–0	0–0	2–3	1–1
Fulham	1–0	3–1	4–0	3–1	1–1	2–0	2–1	1–1	1–0	2–1		4–0	3–2	0–1	1–0	2–2	0–3	1–1	1–1	1–0	2–1	1–3
Grimsby Town	1–2	5–0	1–0	3–2	1–0	2–1	1–1	2–1	4–1	1–1	0–4		1–1	2–0	0–3	2–2	0–2	1–1	1–2	1–1	2–0	1–1
Leeds United	0–0	2–1	1–1	3–1	2–1	1–1	1–2	3–3	2–1	2–1	1–1	1–0		2–2	0–0	3–1	0–0	0–1	2–2	1–2	1–1	0–0
Leicester City	1–0	0–1	0–0	0–0	4–0	6–0	1–2	3–0	0–1	1–1	2–0	2–0	0–1		1–0	2–2	2–1	0–1	3–1	0–2	3–2	5–0
Middlesbrough	2–0	1–5	1–0	1–4	0–1	1–0	3–0	3–1	2–0	2–3	1–4	1–4	0–0	1–1		1–1	1–1	2–1	1–1	1–1	2–1	0–0
Newcastle United	1–2	3–2	2–2	3–0	2–0	2–2	4–2	1–1	1–0	1–0	1–4	4–0	2–1	2–2	1–1		1–0	1–0	4–0	2–1	4–0	1–1
Oldham Athletic	1–1	0–0	2–3	3–0	3–0	4–3	2–2	2–2	2–0	2–2	1–0	1–1	2–2	1–2	3–0	2–2		0–1	1–1	1–1	1–0	4–1
Queens Park Rangers	3–0	2–2	1–0	3–2	2–1	1–0	5–1	1–2	0–0	4–1	3–1	4–0	1–0	2–2	6–1	2–0	1–0		4–0	0–2	4–0	2–1
Rotherham United	1–0	3–1	1–1	1–1	2–0	1–2	1–0	1–0	2–2	1–1	0–1	3–0	0–1	1–3	1–1	1–5	1–3	0–0		0–3	0–3	1–1
Sheffield Wednesday	0–1	0–0	3–1	1–1	3–1	1–1	5–4	3–2	2–1	2–0	2–1	2–0	2–3	2–2	3–1	1–1	1–1	0–1	0–1		0–0	0–0
Shrewsbury Town	3–1	0–0	1–0	1–2	2–1	2–1	0–0	2–0	1–1	1–1	0–1	0–0	0–0	0–2	2–2	2–1	0–0	0–0	2–0	1–0		0–2
Wolverhampton Wanderers	2–0	2–1	0–0	2–0	1–1	2–1	5–0	2–1	1–0	2–1	2–4	3–0	3–0	0–3	4–0	2–2	0–0	4–0	2–0	1–0	2–2	

Source: Soccerbase
Legend: Blue = home team win; Yellow = draw; Red = away team win.

=== Maps ===
Locations of the Football League Second Division London teams 1982–1983
Locations of the Football League Second Division 1982–1983 teams

== Third Division ==
Football League Third Division
- Season: 1982–83
- Champions: Portsmouth (2nd title)
- Promoted: Cardiff City; Huddersfield Town
- Relegated: Reading; Wrexham; Doncaster Rovers; Chesterfield
- Matches: 552
- Goals: 1,617 (2.93 per match)
- Top goalscorer: Kerry Dixon (Reading), 26

Pos	Team	Pld	W	D	L	GF	GA	GD	Pts	Promotion or relegation
1	Portsmouth (C, P)	46	27	10	9	74	41	+33	91	Promotion to the Second Division
2	Cardiff City (P)	46	25	11	10	76	50	+26	86	Promotion to the Second Division
3	Huddersfield Town (P)	46	23	13	10	84	49	+35	82	Promotion to the Second Division
4	Newport County	46	23	9	14	76	54	+22	78	
5	Oxford United	46	22	12	12	71	53	+18	78	
6	Lincoln City	46	23	7	16	77	51	+26	76	
7	Bristol Rovers	46	22	9	15	84	58	+26	75	
8	Plymouth Argyle	46	19	8	19	61	66	−5	65	
9	Brentford	46	18	10	18	88	77	+11	64	
10	Walsall	46	17	13	16	64	63	+1	64	
11	Sheffield United	46	19	7	20	62	64	−2	64	
12	Bradford City	46	16	13	17	68	69	−1	61	
13	Gillingham	46	16	13	17	58	59	−1	61	
14	Bournemouth	46	16	13	17	59	68	−9	61	
15	Southend United	46	15	14	17	66	65	+1	59	
16	Preston North End	46	15	13	18	60	69	−9	58	
17	Millwall	46	14	13	19	64	77	−13	55	
18	Wigan Athletic	46	15	9	22	60	72	−12	54	
19	Exeter City	46	14	12	20	81	104	−23	54	
20	Orient	46	15	9	22	64	88	−24	54	
21	Reading (R)	46	12	17	17	64	79	−15	53	Relegation to the Fourth Division
22	Wrexham (R)	46	12	15	19	56	76	−20	51	Relegation to the Fourth Division
23	Doncaster Rovers (R)	46	9	11	26	57	97	−40	38	Relegation to the Fourth Division
24	Chesterfield (R)	46	8	13	25	43	68	−25	37	Relegation to the Fourth Division

(C) Champions; (P) Promoted; (R) Relegated

=== Results ===
Home \ Away	BOU	BRA	BRE	BRR	CAR	CHF	DON	EXE	GIL	HUD	LIN	MIL	NPC	ORI	OXF	PLY	POR	PNE	REA	SHU	STD	WAL	WIG	WRE
Bournemouth		2–2	4–3	0–0	3–1	2–1	2–2	2–0	0–1	0–1	1–0	3–0	0–1	2–0	2–0	1–0	0–2	4–0	1–1	0–0	0–2	3–0	2–2	1–1
Bradford City	2–3		0–1	2–0	4–2	1–0	1–0	3–3	1–1	3–1	1–1	0–0	4–2	2–3	3–2	4–0	2–2	1–2	3–2	2–0	1–0	1–1	0–1	0–0
Brentford	2–1	0–2		5–1	1–3	4–2	1–0	4–0	1–1	1–0	2–0	1–1	2–0	5–2	1–1	2–0	1–1	3–1	1–2	2–1	4–2	2–3	1–3	4–1
Bristol Rovers	1–1	4–1	2–0		1–1	3–0	2–0	4–4	2–1	1–0	1–2	4–0	1–3	2–1	0–1	2–0	5–1	3–2	3–0	2–1	2–2	2–0	4–0	4–0
Cardiff City	1–1	1–0	3–1	3–1		1–1	3–0	2–0	1–0	1–1	1–0	3–0	3–2	2–0	3–0	0–0	1–0	3–1	0–0	2–0	4–1	3–1	3–2	1–2
Chesterfield	0–0	3–0	2–1	0–0	0–1		3–3	1–3	1–2	0–1	1–3	0–1	3–1	1–2	1–2	1–2	0–1	1–1	0–0	3–1	0–2	0–0	2–0	5–1
Doncaster Rovers	2–1	1–2	4–4	1–2	2–2	0–0		6–1	0–2	0–4	2–2	2–1	0–0	0–3	0–1	2–2	0–2	2–0	7–5	2–0	0–0	1–3	3–6	1–1
Exeter City	4–2	2–1	1–7	0–1	0–2	2–3	3–0		2–2	3–4	3–1	2–1	0–1	2–0	3–1	1–0	1–1	5–1	2–2	0–3	4–3	4–3	2–1	3–3
Gillingham	2–5	3–0	2–2	1–0	2–3	3–1	1–1	4–4		1–3	0–2	1–0	2–0	4–0	0–1	2–1	1–0	2–1	1–0	0–2	1–0	3–0	0–2	1–1
Huddersfield Town	0–0	6–3	2–0	3–1	4–0	3–1	3–0	1–1	3–2		1–1	5–1	1–0	6–0	2–0	2–0	1–1	1–1	3–1	0–0	2–1	2–2	1–1	4–1
Lincoln City	9–0	1–0	2–1	2–1	2–1	2–0	5–1	4–1	3–1	1–2		3–1	1–4	2–0	1–1	1–2	0–3	3–0	4–0	3–0	0–1	2–1	2–1	2–0
Millwall	2–0	1–1	1–0	1–1	0–4	1–1	3–0	5–2	4–1	3–0	2–1		3–0	0–1	2–1	2–2	0–2	1–0	1–1	1–2	3–1	2–2	2–0	1–1
Newport County	5–1	1–1	0–0	2–0	1–0	1–0	1–2	1–1	2–1	2–1	1–0	2–2		4–1	1–2	2–2	0–3	3–0	1–0	3–1	1–1	1–1	1–0	4–0
Orient	5–0	0–1	3–3	1–5	4–0	2–0	1–0	5–1	2–0	1–3	1–1	2–3	1–5		1–5	0–2	2–1	2–1	3–3	4–1	1–1	2–1	1–1	0–0
Oxford United	2–0	5–1	2–2	4–2	2–2	1–0	3–0	1–1	1–1	1–1	1–0	1–0	0–3	2–2		1–1	1–1	3–2	1–2	0–0	1–0	4–2	2–0	2–0
Plymouth Argyle	2–0	3–1	2–0	0–4	3–2	2–0	1–2	1–0	2–0	2–1	0–2	3–1	2–4	2–0	2–1		0–1	1–1	3–0	3–1	1–0	0–0	0–2	2–0
Portsmouth	0–2	0–1	2–1	1–0	0–0	4–0	2–1	3–2	1–0	3–2	4–1	2–0	1–2	2–2	1–0	2–1		3–1	2–2	4–1	2–0	1–0	0–0	3–0
Preston North End	0–1	0–0	3–0	2–2	2–1	1–1	4–1	2–2	0–0	0–0	1–0	3–2	0–0	2–1	1–2	2–2	0–0		2–0	1–0	1–1	1–0	4–1	3–0
Reading	2–1	2–1	1–1	1–2	1–2	0–0	2–0	3–1	0–0	1–1	1–1	3–3	4–2	3–0	0–3	3–2	1–2	2–3		2–0	1–1	1–1	2–1	1–0
Sheffield United	2–2	2–1	1–2	2–1	2–0	3–1	3–1	3–0	0–2	2–0	0–1	1–1	2–0	3–0	3–2	3–1	2–1	2–1	1–1		0–1	3–1	2–0	2–0
Southend United	0–0	1–1	4–2	1–0	1–2	2–0	3–2	1–1	1–1	0–1	2–0	1–1	1–4	1–1	1–2	3–1	4–0	2–3	4–2	3–1		1–1	2–0	2–2
Walsall	3–1	1–1	2–1	5–0	1–2	0–1	1–0	3–2	0–0	2–0	1–1	4–0	2–1	2–0	1–0	2–0	0–3	2–1	2–1	0–0	1–3		2–0	1–1
Wigan Athletic	1–2	3–2	3–2	0–5	0–0	2–2	0–3	1–0	2–2	2–0	2–1	3–1	0–1	0–1	0–1	3–0	0–1	0–1	2–2	3–2	4–0	1–3		3–1
Wrexham	1–0	0–4	3–4	0–0	0–0	0–0	5–0	1–2	1–0	1–1	0–1	4–3	1–0	1–0	1–1	2–3	0–2	3–1	4–0	4–1	3–2	4–0	1–1	

Source: Soccerbase
Legend: Blue = home team win; Yellow = draw; Red = away team win.

=== Maps ===
Locations of the Football League Third Division London teams 1982–1983
Locations of the Football League Third Division teams 1982–1983

== Fourth Division ==
Football League Fourth Division
- Season: 1982–83
- Champions: Wimbledon (1st title)
- Promoted: Hull City; Port Vale; Scunthorpe United
- Failed re-election: None
- Matches: 552
- Goals: 1,502 (2.72 per match)
- Top goalscorer: Steve Cammack (Scunthorpe United), 25

Pos	Team	Pld	W	D	L	GF	GA	GD	Pts	Promotion
1	Wimbledon (C, P)	46	29	11	6	96	45	+51	98	Promotion to the Third Division
2	Hull City (P)	46	25	15	6	75	34	+41	90	Promotion to the Third Division
3	Port Vale (P)	46	26	10	10	67	34	+33	88	Promotion to the Third Division
4	Scunthorpe United (P)	46	23	14	9	71	42	+29	83	Promotion to the Third Division
5	Bury	46	23	12	11	74	46	+28	81	
6	Colchester United	46	24	9	13	75	55	+20	81	
7	York City	46	22	13	11	88	58	+30	79	
8	Swindon Town	46	19	11	16	61	54	+7	68	
9	Peterborough United	46	17	13	16	58	52	+6	64	
10	Mansfield Town	46	16	13	17	61	70	−9	61	
11	Halifax Town	46	16	12	18	59	66	−7	60	
12	Torquay United	46	17	7	22	56	65	−9	58	
13	Chester City	46	15	11	20	55	60	−5	56	
14	Bristol City	46	13	17	16	59	70	−11	56	
15	Northampton Town	46	14	12	20	65	75	−10	54	
16	Stockport County	46	14	12	20	60	79	−19	54	
17	Darlington	46	13	13	20	61	71	−10	52	
18	Aldershot	46	12	15	19	61	82	−21	51	
19	Tranmere Rovers	46	13	11	22	49	71	−22	50	
20	Rochdale	46	11	16	19	55	73	−18	49	
21	Blackpool	46	13	12	21	55	74	−19	49 (Note: Blackpool had two points deducted.)	Re-elected
22	Hartlepool United	46	13	9	24	46	76	−30	48	Re-elected
23	Crewe Alexandra	46	11	8	27	53	71	−18	41	Re-elected
24	Hereford United	46	11	8	27	42	79	−37	41	Re-elected

(C) Champions; (P) Promoted

=== Results ===
Home \ Away	ALD	BLP	BRI	BRY	CHE	COL	CRE	DAR	HAL	HAR	HER	HUL	MAN	NOR	PET	PTV	ROC	SCU	STP	SWI	TOR	TRA	WDN	YOR
Aldershot		2–1	0–0	1–1	1–2	0–1	0–0	1–6	6–1	0–2	2–1	1–2	2–1	3–0	2–0	1–4	6–4	1–1	2–1	1–1	2–1	1–0	1–1	2–3
Blackpool	4–1		1–4	1–1	1–1	1–2	2–0	2–0	0–0	1–2	5–1	1–1	2–1	0–0	0–3	2–0	1–0	3–1	0–0	2–1	1–0	0–2	1–1	1–1
Bristol City	2–0	0–0		2–1	0–0	0–2	2–1	2–2	3–0	2–0	1–1	2–1	3–1	1–3	1–0	1–3	0–0	0–2	2–2	1–1	0–1	1–0	4–2	2–2
Bury	3–1	4–1	2–2		3–2	1–0	0–1	3–0	2–0	4–0	3–2	2–3	1–0	1–1	1–0	0–1	0–0	1–0	3–2	0–0	3–0	3–0	1–3	2–1
Chester City	1–1	1–2	1–0	0–1		1–1	1–0	2–3	2–0	2–1	5–0	0–0	1–3	2–1	1–1	1–0	5–2	1–2	0–2	0–1	0–0	0–0	1–2	0–1
Colchester United	0–0	4–1	3–1	2–1	1–0		4–3	2–2	1–0	4–1	3–2	0–0	2–0	3–1	1–0	1–2	4–1	5–1	3–0	1–0	1–0	3–3	3–0	0–0
Crewe Alexandra	0–0	3–1	4–1	3–3	3–2	0–1		2–5	1–1	3–0	3–1	0–3	1–2	1–0	0–3	1–2	1–1	0–1	3–0	3–0	1–1	0–1	0–2	2–1
Darlington	1–1	0–1	2–2	1–2	0–2	1–3	1–1		1–2	2–1	2–1	1–2	0–0	2–0	4–3	0–0	3–0	0–1	3–1	1–0	0–2	1–0	0–2	1–3
Halifax Town	1–3	2–0	2–2	1–0	0–0	4–0	0–3	2–0		1–1	2–2	1–2	0–0	2–0	1–2	0–2	0–0	3–1	1–0	1–0	3–0	1–2	1–1	2–2
Hartlepool United	1–1	2–1	3–1	0–1	1–0	1–4	1–0	2–0	1–2		0–1	0–0	0–4	2–1	0–0	2–2	3–0	0–0	3–2	1–2	0–2	4–0	1–0	2–0
Hereford United	2–1	0–0	1–3	0–2	5–2	0–0	1–0	0–0	2–0	1–0		2–0	0–2	1–1	0–1	0–2	1–0	0–2	0–0	1–2	0–1	1–0	1–4	0–0
Hull City	2–2	3–1	1–0	2–1	2–0	3–0	1–0	0–0	1–1	1–1	2–0		2–2	4–0	4–1	1–0	2–1	1–1	7–0	0–0	4–1	0–1	1–1	4–0
Mansfield Town	4–1	2–1	1–1	1–4	2–1	1–1	1–0	0–2	1–2	3–0	0–1	3–1		2–0	0–0	0–2	2–1	0–2	1–0	1–0	2–1	1–1	2–2	2–2
Northampton Town	1–1	2–1	7–1	0–3	1–1	2–1	4–0	3–3	3–1	3–1	2–1	1–2	1–2		0–0	2–2	1–1	2–1	2–3	0–1	2–0	1–0	2–2	1–1
Peterborough United	0–0	3–1	3–0	1–1	0–1	2–1	2–1	1–1	2–1	2–1	4–0	1–1	3–2	2–0		0–0	1–0	0–1	1–0	4–3	1–3	3–0	0–3	2–2
Port Vale	2–1	1–0	1–1	0–0	2–1	0–0	1–1	2–1	2–1	3–0	2–0	1–0	4–1	1–2	2–1		4–0	0–1	2–3	3–0	1–0	0–1	1–0	2–1
Rochdale	3–1	3–1	1–0	0–0	0–1	2–1	0–1	1–1	2–2	2–0	4–1	1–3	2–2	2–0	1–1	3–3		0–1	1–0	1–1	2–2	4–2	0–2	1–0
Scunthorpe United	1–1	4–3	1–1	0–1	2–0	2–1	2–0	2–2	2–0	3–0	1–2	0–1	2–2	5–1	3–0	1–0	1–1		3–0	2–0	2–0	2–1	0–0	0–0
Stockport County	2–1	3–0	2–2	2–1	3–3	3–0	3–2	2–1	4–2	1–1	2–1	1–1	1–1	0–1	1–1	0–2	2–2	1–1		1–2	1–0	3–2	1–3	2–1
Swindon Town	2–0	3–3	2–0	1–1	2–3	3–0	1–0	1–2	0–1	3–0	3–2	0–1	4–0	1–5	1–0	1–0	4–1	2–2	2–0		2–1	4–2	0–1	3–2
Torquay United	4–2	1–3	0–2	2–3	0–1	2–0	2–1	1–0	1–3	3–2	2–1	0–0		3–1	2–1	0–1	3–2	1–1	3–0	1–1		3–0	0–1	1–3
Tranmere Rovers	1–1	1–1	2–2	1–1	2–4	2–4	1–1	2–0	1–2	1–1	2–1	0–1	3–0	2–1	1–0	0–2	0–0	0–4	1–1	2–0	2–0		0–2	3–0
Wimbledon	6–1	5–0	2–1	2–1	4–0	2–1	3–2	3–1	2–4	2–0	1–0	1–2	1–1	1–1	2–1	1–0	3–0	2–2	2–1	0–0	4–1	4–0		4–3
York City	4–0	2–0	3–0	3–1	1–0	3–0	2–0	5–2	3–2	5–1	5–1	1–0	6–1	5–2	1–1	0–0	1–0	2–1	3–1	0–0	1–1	2–1	1–4	

Source: Soccerbase
Legend: Blue = home team win; Yellow = draw; Red = away team win.

=== Maps ===
Locations of the Football League Fourth Division teams 1982–1983
Locations of the Football League Fourth Division London teams 1982–1983

== Election/re-election to the Football League ==
This year Enfield, the winners of the Alliance Premier League, could not apply for election because they did not meet Football League requirements, so second-placed Maidstone United won the right to apply for election to the Football League to replace one of the four bottom sides in the 1982–83 Football League Fourth Division. The vote went as follows:

Club	Final Position	Votes
Blackpool	21st (Fourth Division)	52
Crewe Alexandra	23rd (Fourth Division)	49
Hereford United	24th (Fourth Division)	49
Hartlepool United	22nd (Fourth Division)	36
Maidstone United	2nd (Alliance Premier League)	26

As a result of this, all four Football League teams were re-elected, and Maidstone United were denied membership of the League.

== Attendances ==
=== First Division ===
#	Football club	Home games	Average attendance
1	Manchester United	21	41,555
2	Liverpool FC	21	34,758
3	Tottenham Hotspur	21	30,581
4	Manchester City	21	26,789
5	Arsenal FC	21	24,153
6	Aston Villa	21	23,748
7	West Ham United	21	22,822
8	Everton FC	21	20,277
9	Ipswich Town	21	19,646
10	Watford FC	21	19,488
11	Southampton FC	21	18,779
12	Nottingham Forest	21	17,851
13	Sunderland AFC	21	17,370
14	Norwich City	21	16,862
15	Stoke City	21	16,622
16	Birmingham City	21	15,638
17	West Bromwich Albion	21	15,200
18	Brighton & Hove Albion	21	14,662
19	Luton Town	21	13,452
20	Swansea City	21	11,704
21	Coventry City	21	10,552
22	Notts County	21	10,266

=== Second Division ===
#	Football club	Home games	Average attendance
1	Newcastle United	21	24,166
2	Sheffield Wednesday	21	16,835
3	Leeds United	21	15,994
4	Wolverhampton Wanderers	21	15,667
5	Derby County	21	13,601
6	Queens Park Rangers	21	12,807
7	Chelsea	21	12,672
8	Leicester City	21	12,380
9	Barnsley FC	21	12,341
10	Fulham	21	10,826
11	Middlesbrough FC	21	10,018
12	Crystal Palace	21	9,887
13	Burnley FC	21	9,085
14	Rotherham United	21	8,317
15	Grimsby Town	21	7,741
16	Bolton Wanderers	21	7,552
17	Charlton Athletic	21	7,213
18	Blackburn Rovers	21	7,103
19	Oldham Athletic	21	6,962
20	Carlisle United	21	5,944
21	Shrewsbury Town	21	5,277
22	Cambridge United	21	4,513

== See also ==
- 1982–83 in English football
