= 2010–11 Football League =

112nd season of the Football League

The Football League
- Season: 2010–11
- Champions: Queens Park Rangers
- Promoted: Queens Park Rangers; Norwich City; Swansea City
- Relegated: Lincoln City; Stockport County
- New clubs in league: Stevenage; Oxford United

The 2010–11 Football League (known as the npower Football League for sponsorship reasons) was the 112th completed season of the Football League. It began in August 2010 and concluded in May 2011, with the promotion play-off finals.

The Football League is contested through three Divisions. The divisions are the League Championship, League One and League Two. The winner and the runner-up of the League Championship are automatically promoted to the Premier League and they are joined by the winner of the League Championship play-off. The bottom two teams in League Two are relegated to the Conference Premier.

This was the first season that npower sponsored the league, after Coca-Cola's contract expired at the end of the 2009–10 season.

== Promotion and relegation ==
=== From Premier League ===
Relegated to Championship

- Burnley
- Hull City
- Portsmouth

=== From Championship ===
Promoted to Premier League

- Newcastle United
- West Bromwich Albion
- Blackpool

Relegated to League One

- Sheffield Wednesday
- Plymouth Argyle
- Peterborough United

=== From Football League One ===
Promoted to Championship

- Norwich City
- Leeds United
- Millwall

Relegated to League Two

- Gillingham
- Wycombe Wanderers
- Southend United
- Stockport County

=== From Football League Two ===
Promoted to League One

- Notts County
- Bournemouth
- Rochdale
- Dagenham & Redbridge

Relegated to Conference Premier

- Grimsby Town
- Darlington

=== From Conference Premier ===
Promoted to League Two

- Stevenage Borough
- Oxford United

== Championship ==
=== Table ===
Pos	Team	Pld	W	D	L	GF	GA	GD	Pts	Promotion, qualification or relegation
1	Queens Park Rangers (C, P)	46	24	16	6	71	32	+39	88	Promotion to the Premier League
2	Norwich City (P)	46	23	15	8	83	58	+25	84	Promotion to the Premier League
3	Swansea City (O, P)	46	24	8	14	69	42	+27	80	Qualification for Championship play-offs
4	Cardiff City	46	23	11	12	76	54	+22	80	Qualification for Championship play-offs
5	Reading	46	20	17	9	77	51	+26	77	Qualification for Championship play-offs
6	Nottingham Forest	46	20	15	11	69	50	+19	75	Qualification for Championship play-offs
7	Leeds United	46	19	15	12	81	70	+11	72	
8	Burnley	46	18	14	14	65	61	+4	68	
9	Millwall	46	18	13	15	62	48	+14	67	
10	Leicester City	46	19	10	17	76	71	+5	67	
11	Hull City	46	16	17	13	52	51	+1	65	
12	Middlesbrough	46	17	11	18	68	68	0	62	
13	Ipswich Town	46	18	8	20	62	68	−6	62	
14	Watford	46	16	13	17	77	71	+6	61	
15	Bristol City	46	17	9	20	62	65	−3	60	
16	Portsmouth	46	15	13	18	53	60	−7	58	
17	Barnsley	46	14	14	18	55	66	−11	56	
18	Coventry City	46	14	13	19	54	58	−4	55	
19	Derby County	46	13	10	23	58	71	−13	49	
20	Crystal Palace	46	12	12	22	44	69	−25	48	
21	Doncaster Rovers	46	11	15	20	55	81	−26	48	
22	Preston North End (R)	46	10	12	24	54	79	−25	42	Relegation to Football League One
23	Sheffield United (R)	46	11	9	26	44	79	−35	42	Relegation to Football League One
24	Scunthorpe United (R)	46	12	6	28	43	87	−44	42	Relegation to Football League One

Updated to match(es) played on 7 May 2011. Source: The Football League
Rules for classification: 1) points; 2) goal difference; 3) number of goals scored.
(C) Champions; (O) Play-off winners; (P) Promoted; (R) Relegated

=== Play-offs ===
Semi-finals
3	Swansea City	0	3	3
6	Nottingham Forest	0	1	1
4	Cardiff City	0	0	0
5	Reading	0	3	3

Final
3	Swansea City	4
5	Reading	2

=== Results ===
The fixtures for the Championship were released on 17 June 2010. The season kick-off was announced for 6 August 2010 and it concluded on 7 May 2011.

Home \ Away	BAR	BRI	BUR	CAR	COV	CRY	DER	DON	HUL	IPS	LEE	LEI	MID	MIL	NWC	NOT	POR	PNE	QPR	REA	SCU	SHU	SWA	WAT
Barnsley		4–2	1–2	1–2	2–1	1–0	1–1	2–2	1–1	1–1	5–2	0–2	2–0	1–0	0–2	3–1	1–0	2–0	0–1	0–1	2–1	1–0	1–1	0–0
Bristol City	3–3		2–0	3–0	1–2	1–1	2–0	1–0	3–0	0–1	0–2	2–0	0–4	0–3	0–3	2–3	2–1	1–1	1–1	1–0	2–0	3–0	0–2	0–2
Burnley	3–0	0–0		1–1	2–2	1–0	2–1	1–1	4–0	1–2	2–3	3–0	3–1	0–3	2–1	1–0	1–1	4–3	0–0	0–4	0–2	4–2	2–1	3–2
Cardiff City	2–2	3–2	1–1		2–0	0–0	4–1	4–0	2–0	0–2	2–1	2–0	0–3	2–1	3–1	0–2	3–0	1–1	2–2	2–2	1–0	1–1	0–1	4–2
Coventry City	3–0	1–4	1–0	1–2		2–1	2–1	2–1	0–1	1–1	2–3	1–1	1–0	2–1	1–2	1–2	2–0	1–2	0–2	0–0	1–1	0–0	0–1	2–0
Crystal Palace	2–1	0–0	0–0	1–0	2–0		2–2	1–0	0–0	1–2	1–0	3–2	1–0	0–1	0–0	0–3	4–1	1–0	1–2	3–3	1–2	1–0	0–3	3–2
Derby County	0–0	0–2	2–4	1–2	2–2	5–0		1–3	0–1	1–2	2–1	0–2	3–1	0–0	1–2	0–1	2–0	3–0	2–2	1–2	3–2	0–1	2–1	4–1
Doncaster Rovers	0–2	1–1	1–0	1–3	1–1	0–0	2–3		3–1	0–6	0–0	1–1	2–1	2–1	3–1	1–1	0–2	1–1	0–1	0–3	3–0	2–0	1–1	1–1
Hull City	2–0	2–0	0–1	0–2	0–0	1–1	2–0	3–1		1–0	2–2	0–1	2–4	0–1	1–1	0–0	1–2	1–0	0–0	1–1	0–1	0–1	2–0	0–0
Ipswich Town	1–3	2–0	1–1	2–0	1–2	2–1	0–2	3–2	1–1		2–1	3–0	3–3	2–0	1–5	0–1	0–2	2–1	0–3	1–3	2–0	3–0	1–3	0–3
Leeds United	3–3	3–1	1–0	0–4	1–0	2–1	1–2	5–2	2–2	0–0		1–2	1–1	3–1	2–2	4–1	3–3	4–6	2–0	0–0	4–0	1–0	2–1	2–2
Leicester City	4–1	2–1	4–0	2–1	1–1	1–1	2–0	5–1	1–1	4–2	2–2		0–0	4–2	2–3	1–0	0–1	1–0	0–2	1–2	3–1	2–2	2–1	4–2
Middlesbrough	1–1	1–2	2–1	1–0	2–1	2–1	2–1	3–0	2–2	1–3	1–2	3–3		0–1	1–1	1–1	2–2	1–1	0–3	3–1	2–0	1–0	3–4	2–1
Millwall	2–0	0–0	1–1	3–3	3–1	3–0	2–0	1–0	4–0	2–1	3–2	2–0	2–3		1–1	0–0	0–1	4–0	2–0	0–0	3–0	0–1	0–2	1–6
Norwich City	2–1	3–1	2–2	1–1	2–2	1–2	3–2	1–1	0–2	4–1	1–1	4–3	1–0	2–1		2–1	0–2	1–1	1–0	2–1	6–0	4–2	2–0	2–3
Nottingham Forest	2–2	1–0	2–0	2–1	2–1	3–0	5–2	0–0	0–1	2–0	1–1	3–2	1–0	1–1	1–1		2–1	2–2	0–0	3–4	5–1	1–1	3–1	1–0
Portsmouth	1–0	3–1	1–2	0–2	0–3	1–0	1–1	2–3	2–3	0–0	2–2	6–1	0–0	1–1	0–1	2–1		1–1	1–1	1–1	2–0	1–0	0–0	3–2
Preston North End	1–2	0–4	1–2	0–1	2–1	4–3	1–2	0–2	0–2	1–0	1–2	1–1	1–3	0–0	0–1	1–2	1–0		1–1	1–1	2–3	3–1	2–1	3–1
Queens Park Rangers	4–0	2–2	1–1	2–1	2–1	2–1	0–0	3–0	1–1	2–0	1–2	1–0	3–0	0–0	0–0	1–1	2–0	3–1		3–1	2–0	3–0	4–0	1–3
Reading	3–0	4–1	2–1	1–1	0–0	3–0	2–1	4–3	1–1	1–0	0–0	3–1	5–2	2–1	3–3	1–1	2–0	2–1	0–1		1–2	2–3	0–1	1–1
Scunthorpe United	0–0	0–2	0–0	2–4	0–2	3–0	0–0	1–3	1–5	1–1	1–4	0–3	0–2	1–2	0–1	1–0	1–1	0–3	4–1	0–2		3–2	1–0	1–2
Sheffield United	2–2	3–2	3–3	0–2	0–1	3–2	0–1	2–2	2–3	1–2	2–0	0–1	1–2	1–1	1–2	2–1	1–0	1–0	0–3	1–1	0–4		1–0	0–1
Swansea City	1–0	0–1	1–0	0–1	2–1	3–0	0–0	3–0	1–1	4–1	3–0	2–0	1–0	1–1	3–0	3–2	1–2	4–0	0–0	1–0	2–0	4–0		1–1
Watford	1–0	1–3	1–3	4–1	2–2	1–1	3–0	2–2	1–2	2–1	0–1	3–2	3–1	1–0	2–2	1–1	3–0	2–2	0–2	1–1	0–2	3–0	2–3	

Updated to match(es) played on 7 May 2011. Source: The Football League
Legend: Blue = home team win; Yellow = draw; Red = away team win.

=== Top scorers ===
Rank	Player	Club	Goals
1	(England) Danny Graham	Watford	24
2	(Republic of Ireland) Shane Long	Reading	21
2	(England) Grant Holt	Norwich City	21
4	(Argentina) Luciano Becchio	Leeds United	19
5	(England) Jay Bothroyd	Cardiff City	18
5	(Morocco) Adel Taarabt	Queens Park Rangers	18
7	(Ivory Coast) Max Gradel	Leeds United	17
7	(England) Scott Sinclair	Swansea City	17
9	(Wales) Steve Morison	Millwall	15
9	(England) Billy Sharp	Doncaster Rovers	15

== League One ==
=== Table ===
Pos	Team	Pld	W	D	L	GF	GA	GD	Pts	Promotion, qualification or relegation
1	Brighton & Hove Albion (C, P)	46	28	11	7	85	40	+45	95	Promotion to Football League Championship
2	Southampton (P)	46	28	8	10	86	38	+48	92	Promotion to Football League Championship
3	Huddersfield Town	46	25	12	9	77	48	+29	87	Qualification for League One play-offs
4	Peterborough United (O, P)	46	23	10	13	106	75	+31	79	Qualification for League One play-offs
5	Milton Keynes Dons	46	23	8	15	67	60	+7	77	Qualification for League One play-offs
6	Bournemouth	46	19	14	13	75	54	+21	71	Qualification for League One play-offs
7	Leyton Orient	46	19	13	14	71	62	+9	70	
8	Exeter City	46	20	10	16	66	73	−7	70	
9	Rochdale	46	18	14	14	63	55	+8	68	
10	Colchester United	46	16	14	16	57	63	−6	62	
11	Brentford	46	17	10	19	55	62	−7	61	
12	Carlisle United	46	16	11	19	60	62	−2	59	
13	Charlton Athletic	46	15	14	17	62	66	−4	59	
14	Yeovil Town	46	16	11	19	56	66	−10	59	
15	Sheffield Wednesday	46	16	10	20	67	67	0	58	
16	Hartlepool United	46	15	12	19	47	65	−18	57	
17	Oldham Athletic	46	13	17	16	53	60	−7	56	
18	Tranmere Rovers	46	15	11	20	53	60	−7	56	
19	Notts County	46	14	8	24	46	60	−14	50	
20	Walsall	46	12	12	22	56	75	−19	48	
21	Dagenham & Redbridge (R)	46	12	11	23	52	70	−18	47	Relegation to Football League Two
22	Bristol Rovers (R)	46	11	12	23	48	82	−34	45	Relegation to Football League Two
23	Plymouth Argyle (R)	46	15	7	24	51	74	−23	42 (Note: Plymouth Argyle deducted 10 points for insolvency.)	Relegation to Football League Two
24	Swindon Town (R)	46	9	14	23	50	72	−22	41	Relegation to Football League Two

Updated to match(es) played on 2 May 2011. Source: BBC
Rules for classification: 1) points; 2) goal difference; 3) number of goals scored.
(C) Champions; (O) Play-off winners; (P) Promoted; (R) Relegated

=== Play-offs ===
Semifinals
3	Huddersfield Town (p)	1	3	4 (4)
6	AFC Bournemouth	1	3	4 (2)
4	Peterborough United	2	2	4
5	Milton Keynes Dons	3	0	3

Final
3	Huddersfield Town	0
4	Peterborough United	3

=== Results ===
Home \ Away	BOU	BRE	B&HA	BRR	CRL	CHA	COL	D&R	EXE	HAR	HUD	LEY	MKD	NTC	OLD	PET	PLY	ROC	SHW	SOU	SWI	TRA	WAL	YEO
Bournemouth		3–1	1–0	2–1	2–0	2–2	1–2	3–0	3–0	0–1	1–1	1–1	3–2	3–3	3–0	5–1	3–0	1–2	0–0	1–3	3–2	1–2	3–0	2–0
Brentford	1–1		0–1	1–0	2–1	2–1	1–1	2–1	1–1	0–0	0–1	2–1	0–2	1–1	1–3	2–1	2–0	1–3	1–0	0–3	0–1	2–1	1–2	1–2
Brighton & Hove Albion	1–1	1–0		2–2	4–3	1–1	2–0	4–3	3–0	4–1	2–3	5–0	2–0	1–0	2–1	3–1	4–0	2–2	2–0	1–2	2–1	2–0	2–1	2–0
Bristol Rovers	1–0	0–0	2–4		1–1	2–2	0–1	0–2	0–2	0–0	0–1	0–3	1–2	2–1	1–0	2–2	2–3	2–1	1–1	0–4	3–1	0–1	2–2	2–1
Carlisle United	1–0	2–0	0–0	4–0		3–4	4–1	0–2	2–2	1–0	2–2	0–1	4–1	1–0	2–2	0–1	1–1	1–1	0–1	3–2	0–0	2–0	1–3	0–2
Charlton Athletic	1–0	0–1	0–4	1–1	1–3		1–0	2–2	1–3	0–0	0–1	3–1	1–0	1–0	1–1	3–2	2–0	3–1	1–0	1–1	2–4	1–1	0–1	3–2
Colchester United	2–1	0–2	1–1	2–1	1–1	3–3		2–2	5–1	3–2	0–3	3–2	1–3	2–1	1–0	2–1	1–1	1–0	1–1	0–2	2–1	3–1	2–0	0–0
Dagenham & Redbridge	1–2	4–1	0–1	0–3	3–0	2–1	1–0		1–1	1–1	1–1	2–0	0–1	3–1	0–1	0–2	0–1	0–1	1–1	1–3	2–1	2–2	1–1	2–1
Exeter City	2–0	2–4	1–2	2–2	2–1	1–0	2–2	2–1		1–2	1–4	2–1	1–1	3–1	2–0	2–2	1–0	1–0	5–1	1–2	1–0	1–1	2–1	2–3
Hartlepool United	2–2	3–0	3–1	2–2	0–4	2–1	1–0	0–1	2–3		0–1	0–1	0–1	1–1	4–2	2–0	2–0	0–2	0–5	0–0	2–2	1–1	2–1	3–1
Huddersfield Town	2–2	4–4	2–1	0–1	2–0	3–1	0–0	2–1	0–1	0–1		2–2	4–1	3–0	0–0	1–1	3–2	2–1	1–0	2–0	0–0	0–0	1–0	4–2
Leyton Orient	2–2	1–0	0–0	4–1	0–0	1–3	4–2	1–1	3–0	1–0	1–2		2–2	2–0	1–0	2–1	2–0	2–1	4–0	0–2	3–0	0–3	0–0	1–5
Milton Keynes Dons	2–0	1–1	1–0	2–0	3–2	2–0	1–1	2–0	1–0	1–0	1–3	2–3		2–1	0–0	1–0	1–3	1–1	1–4	2–0	2–1	2–0	1–1	3–2
Notts County	0–2	1–1	1–1	0–1	0–1	1–0	2–0	1–0	0–2	3–0	0–3	3–2	2–0		0–2	0–1	2–0	1–2	0–2	1–3	1–0	0–1	1–1	4–0
Oldham Athletic	2–1	2–1	0–1	1–1	0–1	0–0	0–0	1–1	3–3	4–0	1–0	1–1	1–2	3–0		0–5	4–2	1–2	2–3	0–6	2–0	0–0	1–1	0–0
Peterborough United	3–3	2–1	0–3	3–0	6–0	1–5	1–1	5–0	3–0	4–0	4–2	2–2	2–1	2–3	5–2		2–1	2–1	5–3	4–4	5–4	2–1	4–1	2–2
Plymouth Argyle	1–2	1–2	0–2	3–1	1–1	2–2	2–1	2–1	2–0	0–1	2–1	1–4	1–0	1–1	0–2	0–3		0–1	3–2	1–3	1–0	1–3	2–0	0–0
Rochdale	0–0	0–1	2–2	3–1	2–3	2–0	1–2	3–2	0–1	0–0	3–0	1–1	1–4	1–0	1–1	2–2	1–1		2–1	2–0	3–3	3–2	3–2	0–1
Sheffield Wednesday	1–1	1–3	1–0	6–2	0–1	2–2	2–1	2–0	1–2	2–0	0–2	1–0	2–2	0–1	0–0	1–4	2–4	2–0		0–1	3–1	4–0	3–0	2–2
Southampton	2–0	0–2	0–0	1–0	1–0	2–0	0–0	4–0	4–0	2–0	4–1	1–1	3–2	0–0	2–1	4–1	0–1	0–2	2–0		4–1	2–0	3–1	3–0
Swindon Town	1–2	1–1	1–2	2–1	0–1	0–3	2–1	1–1	0–0	1–1	1–0	2–2	0–1	1–2	0–2	1–1	2–3	1–1	2–1	1–0		0–0	0–0	0–1
Tranmere Rovers	0–3	0–3	1–1	0–1	2–1	1–1	1–0	2–0	4–0	0–1	0–2	1–2	4–2	0–1	1–2	1–0	1–0	1–1	3–0	2–0	0–2		3–3	0–1
Walsall	0–1	3–2	1–3	6–1	2–1	2–0	0–1	1–0	2–1	5–2	2–4	0–2	1–2	0–3	1–1	1–3	2–1	0–0	1–1	1–0	1–2	1–4		0–1
Yeovil Town	2–2	2–0	0–1	0–1	1–0	0–1	4–2	1–3	1–3	0–2	1–1	2–1	1–0	2–1	1–1	0–2	1–0	0–1	0–2	1–1	3–3	3–1	1–1	

Updated to match(es) played on 7 May 2011. Source: The Football League
Legend: Blue = home team win; Yellow = draw; Red = away team win.

=== Top scorers ===
Rank	Scorer	Club	Goals
1	(Scotland) Craig Mackail-Smith	Peterborough United	26
2	(England) Glenn Murray	Brighton & Hove Albion	22
3	(England) Bradley Wright-Phillips	Plymouth Argyle / Charlton Athletic	21
4	(England) Rickie Lambert	Southampton	19
5	(England) Jamie Cureton	Exeter City	17
7	(Austria) Ashley Barnes	Brighton and Hove Albion	16
7	(England) Will Hoskins	Bristol Rovers	16
7	(Scotland) Jordan Rhodes	Huddersfield Town	16
9	(England) Lee Barnard	Southampton	14
9	(Scotland) George Boyd	Peterborough United	14

== League Two ==
=== Table ===
Pos	Team	Pld	W	D	L	GF	GA	GD	Pts	Promotion, qualification or relegation
1	Chesterfield (C, P)	46	24	14	8	85	51	+34	86	Promotion to League One
2	Bury (P)	46	23	12	11	82	50	+32	81	Promotion to League One
3	Wycombe Wanderers (P)	46	22	14	10	69	50	+19	80	Promotion to League One
4	Shrewsbury Town	46	22	13	11	72	49	+23	79	Qualification to League Two play-offs
5	Accrington Stanley	46	18	19	9	73	55	+18	73	Qualification to League Two play-offs
6	Stevenage (O, P)	46	18	15	13	62	45	+17	69	Qualification to League Two play-offs
7	Torquay United	46	17	18	11	74	53	+21	68 (Note: Torquay United deducted one point and Hereford United deducted three points)	Qualification to League Two play-offs
8	Gillingham	46	17	17	12	67	57	+10	68	
9	Rotherham United	46	17	15	14	75	60	+15	66	
10	Crewe Alexandra	46	18	11	17	87	65	+22	65	
11	Port Vale	46	17	14	15	54	49	+5	65	
12	Oxford United	46	17	12	17	58	60	−2	63	
13	Southend United	46	16	13	17	62	56	+6	61	
14	Aldershot Town	46	14	19	13	54	54	0	61	
15	Macclesfield Town	46	14	13	19	59	73	−14	55	
16	Northampton Town	46	11	19	16	63	71	−8	52	
17	Cheltenham Town	46	13	13	20	56	77	−21	52	
18	Bradford City	46	15	7	24	43	68	−25	52	
19	Burton Albion	46	12	15	19	56	70	−14	51	
20	Morecambe	46	13	12	21	54	73	−19	51	
21	Hereford United	46	12	17	17	50	66	−16	50	
22	Barnet	46	12	12	22	58	77	−19	48	
23	Lincoln City (R)	46	13	8	25	45	81	−36	47	Relegation to Conference National
24	Stockport County (R)	46	9	14	23	48	96	−48	41	Relegation to Conference National

Updated to match(es) played on 28 May 2011. Source: The Football League
Rules for classification: 1) points; 2) goal difference; 3) number of goals scored.
(C) Champions; (O) Play-off winners; (P) Promoted; (R) Relegated

=== Play-offs ===
Semifinals
4	Shrewsbury Town	0	0	0
7	Torquay United	2	0	2
5	Accrington Stanley	0	0	0
6	Stevenage	2	1	3

Final
6	Stevenage	1
7	Torquay United	0

=== Results ===
Home \ Away	ACC	ALD	BAR	BRA	BRT	BRY	CHL	CHF	CRE	GIL	HER	LIN	MAC	MOR	NOR	OXF	PTV	ROT	SHR	STD	STE	STP	TOR	WYC
Accrington Stanley		0–0	3–1	3–0	3–1	1–0	2–4	2–2	3–2	7–4	4–0	3–0	3–0	1–1	3–1	0–0	3–0	2–3	1–3	3–1	1–0	3–0	1–0	1–1
Aldershot Town	1–1		1–0	1–0	1–2	1–3	0–2	0–2	3–2	1–1	1–2	2–2	0–0	2–1	1–1	1–2	1–2	2–2	3–0	1–0	1–1	1–0	1–0	0–0
Barnet	2–0	1–2		0–2	0–0	1–1	3–1	2–2	2–1	1–2	2–0	4–2	1–0	1–2	4–1	2–2	1–0	1–4	1–1	0–2	0–3	1–3	0–3	0–1
Bradford City	1–1	2–1	1–3		1–1	1–0	3–1	0–1	1–5	1–0	1–0	1–2	0–1	0–1	1–1	5–0	0–2	2–1	1–2	0–2	1–0	3–2	0–3	1–0
Burton Albion	1–1	1–2	1–4	3–0		1–3	2–0	1–0	1–1	1–1	3–0	3–1	3–2	3–2	1–1	0–0	0–0	2–4	0–0	3–1	0–2	2–1	3–3	1–2
Bury	3–0	1–1	2–0	0–1	1–0		2–3	1–1	3–1	5–4	1–1	1–0	2–2	1–0	1–1	3–0	0–1	1–1	1–0	1–0	3–0	0–1	1–2	1–3
Cheltenham Town	1–2	1–2	1–1	4–0	2–1	0–2		0–3	3–2	1–2	0–3	1–2	0–1	1–1	1–0	1–1	0–0	1–1	0–1	0–2	1–0	2–1	2–2	1–2
Chesterfield	5–2	2–2	2–1	2–2	1–2	2–3	3–0		5–5	3–1	4–0	2–1	2–1	0–2	2–1	1–2	2–0	5–0	4–3	2–1	1–0	4–1	1–0	4–1
Crewe Alexandra	0–0	3–1	7–0	2–1	4–1	3–0	8–1	2–0		1–1	0–1	1–1	1–1	2–1	2–0	1–1	2–1	0–1	1–2	1–0	0–1	2–0	3–3	3–0
Gillingham	3–1	2–1	2–4	2–0	1–0	1–1	1–1	0–2	1–3		0–0	0–1	2–4	1–1	1–0	0–0	3–0	3–1	2–0	0–0	1–0	2–1	1–1	0–2
Hereford United	1–1	2–2	1–2	1–1	0–0	0–3	1–1	3–0	1–0	0–0		0–1	2–2	2–1	1–1	0–2	1–1	0–1	0–2	1–3	1–4	3–0	2–2	0–0
Lincoln City	0–0	0–3	1–0	1–2	0–0	0–5	0–2	0–2	1–1	0–4	3–1		2–1	2–0	0–2	3–1	1–0	0–6	1–5	2–1	0–1	0–0	0–2	1–2
Macclesfield Town	2–2	2–0	1–1	0–1	2–1	2–4	0–2	1–1	1–0	2–4	1–1	1–1		2–0	2–0	3–2	0–3	0–2	0–1	0–0	0–4	0–2	3–3	0–1
Morecambe	1–2	1–1	2–2	0–1	2–1	1–4	1–1	1–1	1–2	1–1	1–1	1–2	1–2		1–2	0–3	1–0	0–0	1–0	2–1	0–0	5–0	2–1	0–3
Northampton Town	0–0	1–1	0–0	0–2	2–3	2–4	1–1	1–2	6–2	2–1	3–4	2–1	0–1	3–3		2–1	0–0	2–2	2–3	2–1	2–0	2–0	2–2	1–1
Oxford United	0–0	0–1	2–1	2–1	3–0	1–2	1–1	0–0	2–1	0–1	0–2	2–1	2–1	4–0	3–1		2–1	2–1	3–1	0–2	1–2	0–1	0–2	2–2
Port Vale	2–0	1–0	0–0	2–1	2–1	0–0	0–1	1–1	2–1	0–0	1–1	2–1	2–1	7–2	1–1	1–2		1–0	1–0	1–1	1–3	1–2	1–2	2–1
Rotherham United	2–0	1–0	0–0	0–0	3–3	0–0	6–4	1–0	3–1	0–1	0–0	2–1	1–1	0–1	2–2	2–1	5–0		1–3	1–2	1–1	4–0	3–1	3–4
Shrewsbury Town	0–0	1–1	2–1	3–1	3–0	0–3	1–1	0–0	0–1	0–0	4–0	2–0	4–1	1–3	3–1	3–0	2–2	1–0		1–1	1–0	2–0	1–1	1–1
Southend United	1–1	0–0	2–1	4–0	1–1	1–1	1–2	2–3	0–2	2–2	4–0	1–0	4–1	2–3	1–1	2–1	1–3	1–0	0–2		1–0	1–1	2–1	3–2
Stevenage	2–2	2–2	4–2	2–1	2–1	3–3	4–0	0–0	1–1	2–2	0–1	2–1	2–2	2–0	0–1	0–0	1–0	3–0	1–1	1–1		3–1	0–0	0–2
Stockport County	2–2	2–2	2–1	1–1	0–0	2–1	1–1	1–1	3–3	1–5	0–5	3–4	1–4	0–2	2–2	2–1	0–5	3–3	0–4	2–1	2–2		1–1	0–0
Torquay United	0–0	0–1	1–1	2–0	1–0	3–4	2–1	0–0	2–1	1–1	1–3	2–0	1–3	3–1	3–0	3–4	0–0	1–1	5–0	1–1	2–0	2–0		0–0
Wycombe Wanderers	1–2	2–2	4–2	1–0	4–1	1–0	2–1	1–2	2–0	1–0	2–1	2–2	1–2	2–0	2–2	0–0	1–1	1–0	2–2	3–1	0–1	2–0	1–3	

Updated to match(es) played on 7 May 2011. Source: The Football League
Legend: Blue = home team win; Yellow = draw; Red = away team win.

=== Top scorers ===
Rank	Scorer	Club	Goals
1	(Jamaica) Clayton Donaldson	Crewe Alexandra	26
2	(England) Ryan Lowe	Bury	25
3	(England) Cody McDonald	Gillingham	24
4	(Wales) Craig Davies	Chesterfield	22
5	(England) Adam Le Fondre	Rotherham United	21
6	(England) Wesley Thomas	Cheltenham Town	18
7	(Republic of Ireland) Barry Corr	Southend United	17
7	(England) Shaun Miller	Crewe Alexandra	17
9	(England) Ashley Grimes	Lincoln City	15
9	(England) Shaun Harrad	Northampton Town	15
9	(England) Jack Lester	Chesterfield	15
9	(England) Marc Richards	Port Vale	15
9	(England) Jake Robinson	Torquay United	15

== Managerial changes ==
Team	Outgoing manager	Manner of departure	Date of vacancy	Position in table	Incoming manager	Date of appointment
Milton Keynes Dons	Paul Ince	Resigned	16 April 2010	Pre-season	Karl Robinson	10 May 2010
Hereford United	Graham Turner	Resigned	16 April 2010	Pre-Season	Simon Davey	22 June 2010
Barnet	Ian Hendon	Sacked	28 April 2010	Pre-Season	Mark Stimson	1 June 2010
Shrewsbury Town	Paul Simpson	Sacked	30 April 2010	Pre-Season	Graham Turner	11 June 2010
Crystal Palace	Paul Hart	Contract expired	2 May 2010	Pre-season	George Burley	17 June 2010
Coventry City	Chris Coleman	Sacked	4 May 2010	Pre-season	Aidy Boothroyd	20 May 2010
Plymouth Argyle	Paul Mariner	Became head coach	6 May 2010	Pre-season	Peter Reid	24 June 2010
Gillingham	Mark Stimson	Mutual consent	10 May 2010	Pre-season	Andy Hessenthaler	22 May 2010
Hull City	Iain Dowie	Contract expired	9 May 2010	Pre-season	Nigel Pearson	29 June 2010
Portsmouth	Avram Grant	Resigned	20 May 2010	Pre-season	Steve Cotterill	18 June 2010
Notts County	Steve Cotterill	End of contract	27 May 2010	Pre-season	Craig Short	4 June 2010
Stockport	Gary Ablett	Sacked	17 June 2010	Pre-Season	Paul Simpson	12 July 2010
Leicester City	Nigel Pearson	Signed by Hull City	29 June 2010	Pre-season	Paulo Sousa	7 July 2010
Swansea City	Paulo Sousa	Signed by Leicester City	5 July 2010	Pre-season	Brendan Rodgers	16 July 2010
Bristol City	Steve Coppell	Resigned	12 August 2010	23rd	Keith Millen	12 August 2010
Sheffield United	Kevin Blackwell	Mutual consent	14 August 2010	21st	Gary Speed	17 August 2010
Southampton	Alan Pardew	Sacked	30 August 2010	21st	Nigel Adkins	12 September 2010
Scunthorpe United	Nigel Adkins	Signed By Southampton	12 September 2010	15th	Ian Baraclough	24 September 2010
Lincoln City	Chris Sutton	Resigned	29 September 2010	21st	Steve Tilson	15 October 2010
Leicester City	Paulo Sousa	Sacked	1 October 2010	24th	Sven-Göran Eriksson	3 October 2010
Hereford United	Simon Davey	Sacked	4 October 2010	24th	Jamie Pitman	19 December 2010
Middlesbrough	Gordon Strachan	Resigned	18 October 2010	20th	Tony Mowbray	26 October 2010
Notts County	Craig Short	Sacked	24 October 2010	16th	Paul Ince	28 October 2010
Sheffield United	Gary Speed	Signed by Wales	14 December 2010	20th	Micky Adams	30 December 2010
Bristol Rovers	Paul Trollope	Sacked	15 December 2010	21st	Dave Penney	10 January 2011
Burnley	Brian Laws	Sacked	29 December 2010	9th	Eddie Howe	14 January 2011
Preston North End	Darren Ferguson	Sacked	29 December 2010	24th	Phil Brown	6 January 2011
Port Vale	Micky Adams	Signed by Sheffield United	30 December 2010	2nd	Jim Gannon	6 January 2011
Crystal Palace	George Burley	Sacked	1 January 2011	23rd	Dougie Freedman	12 January 2011
Barnet	Mark Stimson	Sacked	1 January 2011	23rd	Martin Allen	23 March 2011
Walsall	Chris Hutchings	Sacked	4 January 2011	24th	Dean Smith	21 January 2011
Charlton Athletic	Phil Parkinson	Sacked	4 January 2011	5th	Chris Powell	14 January 2011
Stockport County	Paul Simpson	Sacked	4 January 2011	21st	Ray Mathias	9 March 2011
Ipswich Town	Roy Keane	Sacked	7 January 2011	19th	Paul Jewell	10 January 2011
Peterborough United	Gary Johnson	Mutual consent	10 January 2011	7th	Darren Ferguson	12 January 2011
Aldershot Town	Kevin Dillon	Sacked	10 January 2011	20th	Dean Holdsworth	12 January 2011
Bournemouth	Eddie Howe	Signed by Burnley	16 January 2011	4th	Lee Bradbury	28 January 2011
Sheffield Wednesday	Alan Irvine	Sacked	3 February 2011	12th	Gary Megson	4 February 2011
Brentford	Andy Scott	Sacked	3 February 2011	19th	Nicky Forster	1 March 2011
Bradford City	Peter Taylor	Stepped down	26 February 2011	20th	Peter Jackson	28 February 2011
Northampton Town	Ian Sampson	Sacked	2 March 2011	16th	Gary Johnson	4 March 2011
Swindon Town	Danny Wilson	Resigned	2 March 2011	22nd	Paul Hart	3 March 2011
Notts County	Paul Ince	Mutual consent	3 March 2011	19th	Martin Allen	11 April 2011
Bristol Rovers	Dave Penney	Sacked	7 March 2011	23rd	Paul Buckle	30 May 2011
Coventry City	Aidy Boothroyd	Sacked	14 March 2011	19th	Andy Thorn	28 April 2011
Scunthorpe United	Ian Baraclough	Sacked	16 March 2011	22nd	Alan Knill	31 March 2011
Port Vale	Jim Gannon	Sacked	21 March 2011	8th	Micky Adams	13 May 2011
Rotherham United	Ronnie Moore	Mutual consent	22 March 2011	9th	Andy Scott	13 April 2011
Bury	Alan Knill	Signed by Scunthorpe United	31 March 2011	4th	Richard Barker (caretaker)	31 March 2011
Barnet	Martin Allen	Signed by Notts County	11 April 2011	23rd	Giuliano Grazioli (caretaker)	11 April 2011
Swindon Town	Paul Hart	Sacked	28 April 2011	24th	Paul Bodin	28 April 2011
