= 2010–11 Football League One =

Football League One
- Season: 2010–11
- Champions: Brighton & Hove Albion (3rd divisional title)
- Promoted: Brighton & Hove Albion; Southampton; Peterborough United
- Relegated: Dagenham & Redbridge; Bristol Rovers; Plymouth Argyle; Swindon Town
- Matches: 552
- Goals: 1,509 (2.73 per match)
- Top goalscorer: Craig Mackail-Smith (27)
- Biggest home win: Peterborough United 6–0 Carlisle United (12 March 2011)
- Biggest away win: Oldham Athletic 0–6 Southampton (11 January 2011)
- Highest scoring: Peterborough United 5–4 Swindon Town (16 October 2010)
- Longest winning run: 8 games Brighton
- Longest unbeaten run: 25 games Huddersfield Town
- Longest winless run: 18 games Swindon Town
- Longest losing run: 9 games Notts County
- Highest attendance: 31,653; Southampton 3–1 Walsall (7 May 2011)
- Lowest attendance: 1,907; Dagenham & Redbridge 4–1 Brentford (1 February 2011)
- Average attendance: 7,526

The 2010–11 Football League One (known as Npower League One for sponsorship reasons) was the seventh season of the league under its current title and nineteenth season under its current league division format. It started on 7 August 2010.

== Changes from 2009–10 ==
=== Team changes ===
==== From League One ====
Promoted to Championship

- Norwich City
- Leeds United
- Millwall

Relegated to League Two

- Southend United
- Wycombe Wanderers
- Stockport County
- Gillingham

==== To League One ====
Relegated from Championship

- Sheffield Wednesday
- Plymouth Argyle
- Peterborough United

Promoted from League Two

- Notts County
- Rochdale
- Bournemouth
- Dagenham & Redbridge

=== Rule changes ===
==== On field rules ====
- Clubs are now restricted to having 25 first-team players over the age of 21, of which 10 must be home grown (registered in domestic football for three seasons before their 21st birthday). There is no restriction to players under 21.

==== Off field rules ====
- The new financial reporting rules will see clubs that fail to lodge their accounts with the Football League, at the same time they are required by Companies House, being hit with a transfer embargo.
- The Football League's Fit and Proper Person test was renamed "Director's Test" to ensure continuity with other football bodies.

=== Sponsorship changes ===
Npower will be the Football League's new sponsor after Coca-Cola's contract ran out and was not renewed. The "Player of the Month" and "Manager of the Month" awards will now been known as the "Npower Player of the Month" and the "Npower Manager of the Month" award respectively. Coca-Cola signed a three-year contract to become the Football League's official partner.

== Team overview ==
=== Stadiums and locations ===
Locations of teams in the 2010–11 Football League One

Team	Location	Stadium	Capacity
Bournemouth	Bournemouth	Dean Court	9,600
Brentford	London	Griffin Park	12,763
Brighton & Hove Albion	Brighton	Withdean Stadium	8,850
Bristol Rovers	Bristol	Memorial Stadium	12,011
Carlisle United	Carlisle	Brunton Park Stadium	16,981
Charlton Athletic	London	The Valley	27,111
Colchester United	Colchester	Colchester Community Stadium	10,064
Dagenham & Redbridge	London	Victoria Road	6,078
Exeter City	Exeter	St James Park	8,830
Hartlepool United	Hartlepool	Victoria Park	8,240
Huddersfield Town	Huddersfield	Galpharm Stadium	24,500
Leyton Orient	London	Brisbane Road	9,271
Milton Keynes Dons	Milton Keynes	Stadium:mk	22,000
Notts County	Nottingham	Meadow Lane	21,388
Oldham Athletic	Oldham	Boundary Park	10,638
Peterborough United	Peterborough	London Road Stadium	15,460
Plymouth Argyle	Plymouth	Home Park	19,500
Rochdale	Rochdale	Spotland Stadium	10,249
Sheffield Wednesday	Sheffield	Hillsborough Stadium	39,812
Southampton	Southampton	St Mary's Stadium	32,689
Swindon Town	Swindon	County Ground	14,700
Tranmere Rovers	Birkenhead	Prenton Park	16,789
Walsall	Walsall	The Banks' Stadium	11,300
Yeovil Town	Yeovil	Huish Park	9,665

=== Personnel and sponsoring ===
Team	Manager	Team captain	Chairman	Kit maker	Sponsor
Bournemouth	(England) Lee Bradbury	(England) Jason Pearce	(England) Eddie Mitchell	Carbrini	Carbrini
Brentford	(England) Nicky Forster	(Republic of Ireland) Kevin O'Connor	(England) Greg Dyke	Puma	Hertings Fixings (H); Bathwise (A)
Brighton & Hove Albion	(Uruguay) Gus Poyet	(Scotland) Gordon Greer	(England) Tony Bloom	Erreà	IT First
Bristol Rovers	(Scotland) Stuart Campbell	(England) Will Hoskins	(England) Nick Higgs	Erreà	Smart Computers (H); Johnson's Stalbridge Linen Services (A)
Carlisle United	(England) Greg Abbott	(England) Paul Thirlwell	(England) Andrew Jenkins	Le Coq Sportif	Eddie Stobart Transport
Charlton Athletic	(England) Chris Powell	(Scotland) Christian Dailly	(England) Michael Slater	Macron	Krbs.com
Colchester United	(England) John Ward	(England) Kemal Izzet	(England) Robbie Cowling	Puma	Readers Offers Ltd
Dagenham & Redbridge	(England) John Still	(England) Mark Arber	(England) Dave Andrews	Vandanel	West & Coe
Exeter City	(England) Paul Tisdale	(England) Matt Taylor	(England) Edward Chorlton	Carbrini	Flybe
Hartlepool United	(England) Mick Wadsworth	(England) Sam Collins	(England) Ken Hodcroft	Nike	Dove Energy
Huddersfield Town	(England) Lee Clark	(England) Peter Clarke	(England) Dean Hoyle	Mitre	Kirklees College (H); RadianB (A)
Leyton Orient	(England) Russell Slade	(Republic of Ireland) Stephen Dawson	(England) Barry Hearn	Puma	PartyCasino.com
Milton Keynes Dons	(England) Karl Robinson	(England) Dean Lewington	(England) Pete Winkelman	ISC	Double Tree by Hilton
Notts County	(England) Martin Allen	(England) Mike Edwards	(England) Ray Trew	Nike	Lorien Connect (H); Vision Express (A)
Oldham Athletic	(Scotland) Paul Dickov	(England) Reuben Hazell	(England) Simon Corney	Carbrini	Carbrini
Peterborough United	(Scotland) Darren Ferguson	(Northern Ireland) Grant McCann	(Republic of Ireland) Darragh MacAnthony	adidas	MRI Overseas Property
Plymouth Argyle	(England) Peter Reid	(Wales) Carl Fletcher	(England) Sir Roy Gardner	adidas	Ginsters
Rochdale	(England) Keith Hill	(England) Gary Jones	(England) Chris Dunphy	Carbrini	Carbrini
Sheffield Wednesday	(England) Gary Megson	(England) Tommy Miller	(Serbia) Milan Mandarić	Puma	Sheffield Children's Hospital
Southampton	(England) Nigel Adkins	(England) Dean Hammond	(Italy) Nicola Cortese	Umbro	None
Swindon Town	(Wales) Paul Bodin (Caretaker)	(Republic of Ireland) Jonathan Douglas	(England) Jeremy Wray (Interim)	adidas	fourfourtwo.com (H); FIFA 11/Samsung (A)
Tranmere Rovers	(England) Les Parry	(England) John Welsh	(England) Peter Johnson	Carbrini	Wirral
Walsall	(England) Dean Smith	(Jamaica) Darren Byfield	(England) Jeff Bonser	Admiral	Walsall Hospice
Yeovil Town	(England) Terry Skiverton	(England) Paul Huntington	(England) John Fry	Vandanel	Jones's Building Contractors

==== Managerial changes ====
Team	Outgoing manager	Manner of departure	Date of vacancy	Incoming manager	Date of appointment	Position in table
Milton Keynes Dons	(England) Paul Ince	Resigned	16 April 2010	(England) Karl Robinson	10 May 2010	Pre-season
Plymouth Argyle	(England) Paul Mariner	Became head coach	6 May 2010	(England) Peter Reid	24 June 2010	Pre-season
Notts County	(England) Steve Cotterill	End of contract	27 May 2010	(England) Craig Short	4 June 2010	Pre-season
Southampton	(England) Alan Pardew	Sacked	30 August 2010	(England) Nigel Adkins	12 September 2010	21st
Notts County	(England) Craig Short	Sacked	24 October 2010	(England) Paul Ince	28 October 2010	16th
Bristol Rovers	(Wales) Paul Trollope	Sacked	15 December 2010	(England) Dave Penney	10 January 2011	21st
Walsall	(England) Chris Hutchings	Sacked	4 January 2011	(England) Dean Smith	21 January 2011	24th
Charlton Athletic	(England) Phil Parkinson	Sacked	4 January 2011	(England) Chris Powell	14 January 2011	5th
Peterborough United	(England) Gary Johnson	Mutual consent	10 January 2011	(Scotland) Darren Ferguson	12 January 2011	7th
Bournemouth	(England) Eddie Howe	Signed by Burnley	16 January 2011	(England) Lee Bradbury	28 January 2011	4th
Sheffield Wednesday	(Scotland) Alan Irvine	Sacked	3 February 2011	(England) Gary Megson	4 February 2011	12th
Brentford	(England) Andy Scott	Sacked	3 February 2011	(England) Nicky Forster	1 March 2011	19th
Swindon Town	(Northern Ireland) Danny Wilson	Resigned	2 March 2011	(England) Paul Hart	3 March 2011	22nd
Notts County	(England) Paul Ince	Mutual consent	3 March 2011	(England) Martin Allen	11 April 2011	19th
Bristol Rovers	(England) Dave Penney	Sacked	7 March 2011	(England) Paul Buckle	30 May 2011	23rd
Swindon Town	(England) Paul Hart	Sacked	28 April 2011	(England) Paul Bodin	28 April 2011	24th

==== Ownership changes ====
Club	New Owner	Previous Owner	Date
Charlton Athletic	CAFC Holdings Ltd	Richard Murray	31 December 2010
Sheffield Wednesday	Milan Mandaric	Various board members	31 December 2010

== League table ==
A total of 24 teams contest the division, including 17 sides remaining in the division from last season, three relegated from the Championship, and four promoted from League Two.

Pos	Team	Pld	W	D	L	GF	GA	GD	Pts	Promotion, qualification or relegation
1	Brighton & Hove Albion (C, P)	46	28	11	7	85	40	+45	95	Promotion to Football League Championship
2	Southampton (P)	46	28	8	10	86	38	+48	92	Promotion to Football League Championship
3	Huddersfield Town	46	25	12	9	77	48	+29	87	Qualification for League One play-offs
4	Peterborough United (O, P)	46	23	10	13	106	75	+31	79	Qualification for League One play-offs
5	Milton Keynes Dons	46	23	8	15	67	60	+7	77	Qualification for League One play-offs
6	Bournemouth	46	19	14	13	75	54	+21	71	Qualification for League One play-offs
7	Leyton Orient	46	19	13	14	71	62	+9	70	
8	Exeter City	46	20	10	16	66	73	−7	70	
9	Rochdale	46	18	14	14	63	55	+8	68	
10	Colchester United	46	16	14	16	57	63	−6	62	
11	Brentford	46	17	10	19	55	62	−7	61	
12	Carlisle United	46	16	11	19	60	62	−2	59	
13	Charlton Athletic	46	15	14	17	62	66	−4	59	
14	Yeovil Town	46	16	11	19	56	66	−10	59	
15	Sheffield Wednesday	46	16	10	20	67	67	0	58	
16	Hartlepool United	46	15	12	19	47	65	−18	57	
17	Oldham Athletic	46	13	17	16	53	60	−7	56	
18	Tranmere Rovers	46	15	11	20	53	60	−7	56	
19	Notts County	46	14	8	24	46	60	−14	50	
20	Walsall	46	12	12	22	56	75	−19	48	
21	Dagenham & Redbridge (R)	46	12	11	23	52	70	−18	47	Relegation to Football League Two
22	Bristol Rovers (R)	46	11	12	23	48	82	−34	45	Relegation to Football League Two
23	Plymouth Argyle (R)	46	15	7	24	51	74	−23	42 (Note: Plymouth Argyle deducted 10 points for insolvency.)	Relegation to Football League Two
24	Swindon Town (R)	46	9	14	23	50	72	−22	41	Relegation to Football League Two

Updated to match(es) played on 2 May 2011. Source: BBC
Rules for classification: 1) points; 2) goal difference; 3) number of goals scored.
(C) Champions; (O) Play-off winners; (P) Promoted; (R) Relegated

== Play-offs ==
Semifinals
3	Huddersfield Town (p)	1	3	4 (4)
6	AFC Bournemouth	1	3	4 (2)
4	Peterborough United	2	2	4
5	Milton Keynes Dons	3	0	3

Final
3	Huddersfield Town	0
4	Peterborough United	3

=== Semifinals ===
14 May 2011
12:45

Bournemouth	1–1	Huddersfield Town
McDermott 60'	Report	Kilbane 22'

Dean Court, Bournemouth
Attendance: 9,043
Referee: Mick Russell
18 May 2011
19:45

Huddersfield Town	3–3 (a.e.t.)	Bournemouth
Peltier 27'; Ward 45+2'; Kay 105'	Report	Lovell 44' (pen.), 63'; Ings 104'
Penalties
Novak (penalty scored); Ward (penalty scored); Kilbane (penalty scored); Kay (penalty scored)	4–2	Symes (penalty scored); Feeney (penalty missed); Robinson (penalty missed); Cooper (penalty scored)

Galpharm Stadium, Huddersfield
Attendance: 16,444
Referee: Neil Swarbrick

Huddersfield Town 4–4 Bournemouth on aggregate. Huddersfield Town won 4–2 on penalties.

15 May 2011
12:15

Milton Keynes Dons	3–2	Peterborough United
Powell 47'; Baldock 50'; Balanta 56'	Report	Mackail-Smith 8'; McCann 81' (pen.)

Stadium MK, Milton Keynes
Attendance: 12,662
Referee: Jonathan Moss
19 May 2011
19:45

Peterborough United	2–0	Milton Keynes Dons
McCann 11'; Mackail-Smith 54'	Report

London Road Stadium, Peterborough
Attendance: 11,920
Referee: Colin Webster

Peterborough United won 4–3 on aggregate.

=== Final ===
29 May 2011
15:00

Huddersfield Town	0–3	Peterborough United
	Report	Rowe 78'; Mackail-Smith 80'; McCann 85'

Old Trafford, Manchester
Attendance: 48,410
Referee: Steve Tanner

== Results ==
Home \ Away	BOU	BRE	B&HA	BRR	CRL	CHA	COL	D&R	EXE	HAR	HUD	LEY	MKD	NTC	OLD	PET	PLY	ROC	SHW	SOU	SWI	TRA	WAL	YEO
Bournemouth		3–1	1–0	2–1	2–0	2–2	1–2	3–0	3–0	0–1	1–1	1–1	3–2	3–3	3–0	5–1	3–0	1–2	0–0	1–3	3–2	1–2	3–0	2–0
Brentford	1–1		0–1	1–0	2–1	2–1	1–1	2–1	1–1	0–0	0–1	2–1	0–2	1–1	1–3	2–1	2–0	1–3	1–0	0–3	0–1	2–1	1–2	1–2
Brighton & Hove Albion	1–1	1–0		2–2	4–3	1–1	2–0	4–3	3–0	4–1	2–3	5–0	2–0	1–0	2–1	3–1	4–0	2–2	2–0	1–2	2–1	2–0	2–1	2–0
Bristol Rovers	1–0	0–0	2–4		1–1	2–2	0–1	0–2	0–2	0–0	0–1	0–3	1–2	2–1	1–0	2–2	2–3	2–1	1–1	0–4	3–1	0–1	2–2	2–1
Carlisle United	1–0	2–0	0–0	4–0		3–4	4–1	0–2	2–2	1–0	2–2	0–1	4–1	1–0	2–2	0–1	1–1	1–1	0–1	3–2	0–0	2–0	1–3	0–2
Charlton Athletic	1–0	0–1	0–4	1–1	1–3		1–0	2–2	1–3	0–0	0–1	3–1	1–0	1–0	1–1	3–2	2–0	3–1	1–0	1–1	2–4	1–1	0–1	3–2
Colchester United	2–1	0–2	1–1	2–1	1–1	3–3		2–2	5–1	3–2	0–3	3–2	1–3	2–1	1–0	2–1	1–1	1–0	1–1	0–2	2–1	3–1	2–0	0–0
Dagenham & Redbridge	1–2	4–1	0–1	0–3	3–0	2–1	1–0		1–1	1–1	1–1	2–0	0–1	3–1	0–1	0–2	0–1	0–1	1–1	1–3	2–1	2–2	1–1	2–1
Exeter City	2–0	2–4	1–2	2–2	2–1	1–0	2–2	2–1		1–2	1–4	2–1	1–1	3–1	2–0	2–2	1–0	1–0	5–1	1–2	1–0	1–1	2–1	2–3
Hartlepool United	2–2	3–0	3–1	2–2	0–4	2–1	1–0	0–1	2–3		0–1	0–1	0–1	1–1	4–2	2–0	2–0	0–2	0–5	0–0	2–2	1–1	2–1	3–1
Huddersfield Town	2–2	4–4	2–1	0–1	2–0	3–1	0–0	2–1	0–1	0–1		2–2	4–1	3–0	0–0	1–1	3–2	2–1	1–0	2–0	0–0	0–0	1–0	4–2
Leyton Orient	2–2	1–0	0–0	4–1	0–0	1–3	4–2	1–1	3–0	1–0	1–2		2–2	2–0	1–0	2–1	2–0	2–1	4–0	0–2	3–0	0–3	0–0	1–5
Milton Keynes Dons	2–0	1–1	1–0	2–0	3–2	2–0	1–1	2–0	1–0	1–0	1–3	2–3		2–1	0–0	1–0	1–3	1–1	1–4	2–0	2–1	2–0	1–1	3–2
Notts County	0–2	1–1	1–1	0–1	0–1	1–0	2–0	1–0	0–2	3–0	0–3	3–2	2–0		0–2	0–1	2–0	1–2	0–2	1–3	1–0	0–1	1–1	4–0
Oldham Athletic	2–1	2–1	0–1	1–1	0–1	0–0	0–0	1–1	3–3	4–0	1–0	1–1	1–2	3–0		0–5	4–2	1–2	2–3	0–6	2–0	0–0	1–1	0–0
Peterborough United	3–3	2–1	0–3	3–0	6–0	1–5	1–1	5–0	3–0	4–0	4–2	2–2	2–1	2–3	5–2		2–1	2–1	5–3	4–4	5–4	2–1	4–1	2–2
Plymouth Argyle	1–2	1–2	0–2	3–1	1–1	2–2	2–1	2–1	2–0	0–1	2–1	1–4	1–0	1–1	0–2	0–3		0–1	3–2	1–3	1–0	1–3	2–0	0–0
Rochdale	0–0	0–1	2–2	3–1	2–3	2–0	1–2	3–2	0–1	0–0	3–0	1–1	1–4	1–0	1–1	2–2	1–1		2–1	2–0	3–3	3–2	3–2	0–1
Sheffield Wednesday	1–1	1–3	1–0	6–2	0–1	2–2	2–1	2–0	1–2	2–0	0–2	1–0	2–2	0–1	0–0	1–4	2–4	2–0		0–1	3–1	4–0	3–0	2–2
Southampton	2–0	0–2	0–0	1–0	1–0	2–0	0–0	4–0	4–0	2–0	4–1	1–1	3–2	0–0	2–1	4–1	0–1	0–2	2–0		4–1	2–0	3–1	3–0
Swindon Town	1–2	1–1	1–2	2–1	0–1	0–3	2–1	1–1	0–0	1–1	1–0	2–2	0–1	1–2	0–2	1–1	2–3	1–1	2–1	1–0		0–0	0–0	0–1
Tranmere Rovers	0–3	0–3	1–1	0–1	2–1	1–1	1–0	2–0	4–0	0–1	0–2	1–2	4–2	0–1	1–2	1–0	1–0	1–1	3–0	2–0	0–2		3–3	0–1
Walsall	0–1	3–2	1–3	6–1	2–1	2–0	0–1	1–0	2–1	5–2	2–4	0–2	1–2	0–3	1–1	1–3	2–1	0–0	1–1	1–0	1–2	1–4		0–1
Yeovil Town	2–2	2–0	0–1	0–1	1–0	0–1	4–2	1–3	1–3	0–2	1–1	2–1	1–0	2–1	1–1	0–2	1–0	0–1	0–2	1–1	3–3	3–1	1–1	

Updated to match(es) played on 7 May 2011. Source: The Football League
Legend: Blue = home team win; Yellow = draw; Red = away team win.

== Season statistics ==
=== Top scorers ===
Rank	Scorer	Club	Goals
1	(Scotland) Craig Mackail-Smith	Peterborough United	27
2	(England) Glenn Murray	Brighton & Hove Albion	22
3	(England) Bradley Wright-Phillips	Plymouth Argyle/Charlton Athletic	21
4	(England) Rickie Lambert	Southampton	20
5	(Austria) Ashley Barnes	Brighton and Hove Albion	17
5	(England) Jamie Cureton	Exeter City	17
5	(England) Will Hoskins	Bristol Rovers	17
5	(England) Gary Jones	Rochdale	17
9	(Scotland) Jordan Rhodes	Huddersfield Town	16
10	(England) Dean Bowditch	Yeovil Town	15
10	(Scotland) George Boyd	Peterborough United	15

=== Top assists ===
Rank	Player	Club	Assists
1	(Northern Ireland) Grant McCann	Peterborough United	21
2	(England) Dean Cox	Leyton Orient	19
3	(England) Elliott Bennett	Brighton & Hove Albion	17
4	(Wales) Nicky Adams	Rochdale	14
5	(England) Craig Noone	Brighton & Hove Albion	13
6	(England) Charlie Daniels	Leyton Orient	12
6	(England) Danny Green	Dagenham & Redbridge	12
8	(England) Ryan Harley	Exeter City	11
8	(England) Rickie Lambert	Southampton	11
8	(England) Adam Lallana	Southampton	11
8	(Scotland) Craig Mackail-Smith	Peterborough United	11
8	(England) Marc Pugh	Bournemouth	11
8	(England) Gary Roberts	Huddersfield Town	11

=== Scoring ===
- First goal of the season: 46 minutes and 17 seconds – Luke Summerfield for Plymouth Argyle against Southampton (7 August 2010).
- Highest scoring game: 9 goals – Peterborough United 5–4 Swindon Town (16 October 2010)
- Most goals scored in a game by one team: 6 goals
  - Sheffield Wednesday 6–2 Bristol Rovers (11 December 2010)
  - Oldham Athletic 0–6 Southampton (11 January 2011)
  - Walsall 6–1 Bristol Rovers (29 January 2011)
  - Peterborough United 6-0 Carlisle United (12 March 2011)
- Widest winning margin: 6 goals
  - Oldham Athletic 0–6 Southampton (11 January 2011)
  - Peterborough United 6-0 Carlisle United (12 March 2011)
- Fewest games failed to score in: 4 – Peterborough United
- Most games failed to score in: 20 – Hartlepool United

=== Discipline ===
- Most yellow cards (club): 85 – Tranmere Rovers
- Most yellow cards (player): 13
  - Luke Ayling (Yeovil Town)
  - Joss Labadie (Tranmere Rovers)
- Most red cards (club): 12 – Plymouth Argyle
- Most red cards (player): 3
  - Christian Dailly (Chartlon Athletic)
  - Gary MacKenzie (Milton Keynes Dons)
- Most fouls (club): 594 – Notts County
- Most fouls (Player): 86 – Joss Labadie (Tranmere Rovers)

=== Clean sheets ===
- Most clean sheets: 20 – Brighton & Hove Albion and Southampton
- Fewest clean sheets: 6 - Dagenham & Redbridge

== Monthly awards ==
Month	Manager of the Month		Player of the Month		Notes
Month	Manager	Club	Player	Club	Notes
August	(Scotland) Alan Irvine	Sheffield Wednesday	(England) Giles Coke	Sheffield Wednesday	
September	(Uruguay) Gus Poyet	Brighton & Hove Albion	(Denmark) Casper Ankergren	Brighton & Hove Albion	
October	(England) Andy Scott	Brentford	(Republic of Ireland) Anthony Pilkington	Huddersfield Town	
November	(England) Phil Parkinson	Charlton Athletic	(England) Johnnie Jackson	Charlton Athletic	
December	(England) Mick Wadsworth	Hartlepool United	(England) Sam Collins	Hartlepool United	
January	(England) Keith Hill	Rochdale	(England) Paul Huntington	Yeovil Town	
February	(Scotland) Darren Ferguson	Peterborough United	(Scotland) Craig Mackail-Smith	Peterborough United	
March	(Uruguay) Gus Poyet	Brighton & Hove Albion	(Denmark) Casper Ankergren	Brighton & Hove Albion	
