= West Country derby =

English sporting rivalry

A West Country derby is a sporting fixture involving teams from the West Country, in England.

== Football ==
The term has been used to describe matches between any two of the following clubs:

- Bristol City, Bristol Rovers, Cheltenham Town, Exeter City, Plymouth Argyle, Forest Green Rovers, Swindon Town, Torquay United, Truro City and Yeovil Town.

== Rugby ==
West Country derby is also a phrase used in rugby, one of the fiercest rivalries is between Bath and Gloucester.

Another rivalry in this category is between the Bristol Bears and the Exeter Chiefs

Bath vs Gloucester

Team	Played	Games won	Draws	Games lost	Points For	Points Against	Point Difference
Bath Rugby	9	4	3	2	18	10	+8
Gloucester Rugby	9	2	3	4	10	18	–8

== Cricket ==
Games between Somerset and Gloucestershire can be referred to as a West Country derby.

Summary of Results

Overall Results
Matches played	Gloucestershire wins	Somerset wins	Draws
33	14	19	–
