= 1971–72 Football League First Division =

1971–72 season of Football League First Division

Football League First Division
- Season: 1971–72
- Champions: Derby County; 1st English title
- Relegated: Nottingham Forest; Huddersfield Town
- European Cup: Derby County
- European Cup Winners' Cup: Leeds United
- UEFA Cup: Liverpool; Manchester City; Tottenham Hotspur; Stoke City
- Watney Cup: Wolverhampton Wanderers; Sheffield United
- Matches: 462
- Goals: 1,160 (2.51 per match)
- Top goalscorer: Francis Lee (33 goals)
- Biggest home win: Everton 8–0 Southampton (20 November 1971)
- Biggest away win: Sheffield United 0–5 Arsenal (29 January 1972)
- Highest scoring: Everton 8–0 Southampton (20 November 1971)

Statistics of Football League First Division in the 1971–72 season.

== Overview ==
Derby County won the First Division title for the first time in the club's history that season. Derby's first ever First Division title was confirmed on 8 May, after title challengers Liverpool and Leeds United failed to win their final games at Arsenal and Wolverhampton Wanderers respectively. On 26 April, Huddersfield Town and Nottingham Forest were relegated after Crystal Palace beat Stoke City 2-0 at Selhurst Park to ensure their survival. Huddersfield did not return to the top flight until the 2017-18 Premier League season.

== League standings ==
Pos	Team	Pld	W	D	L	GF	GA	GAv	Pts	Qualification or relegation
1	Derby County (C)	42	24	10	8	69	33	2.091	58	Qualification for the European Cup first round
2	Leeds United	42	24	9	9	73	31	2.355	57	Qualification for the European Cup Winners' Cup first round (Note: Leeds United qualified for the European Cup Winners' Cup as the 1971-72 FA Cup winners.)
3	Liverpool	42	24	9	9	64	30	2.133	57	Qualification for the UEFA Cup first round
4	Manchester City	42	23	11	8	77	45	1.711	57	Qualification for the UEFA Cup first round
5	Arsenal	42	22	8	12	58	40	1.450	52	
6	Tottenham Hotspur	42	19	13	10	63	42	1.500	51	Qualification for the UEFA Cup first round (Note: Tottenham Hotspur qualified for the UEFA Cup as the 1971-72 UEFA Cup winners.)
7	Chelsea	42	18	12	12	58	49	1.184	48	
8	Manchester United	42	19	10	13	69	61	1.131	48	
9	Wolverhampton Wanderers	42	18	11	13	65	57	1.140	47	Qualification for the Watney Cup (Note: Wolverhampton Wanderers and Sheffield United qualified for the Watney Cup as the two teams with the most goals that hadn't already qualified for a European competition.)
10	Sheffield United	42	17	12	13	61	60	1.017	46	Qualification for the Watney Cup
11	Newcastle United	42	15	11	16	49	52	0.942	41	
12	Leicester City	42	13	13	16	41	46	0.891	39	
13	Ipswich Town	42	11	16	15	39	53	0.736	38	
14	West Ham United	42	12	12	18	47	51	0.922	36	
15	Everton	42	9	18	15	37	48	0.771	36	
16	West Bromwich Albion	42	12	11	19	42	54	0.778	35	
17	Stoke City	42	10	15	17	39	56	0.696	35	Qualification for the UEFA Cup first round
18	Coventry City	42	9	15	18	44	67	0.657	33	
19	Southampton	42	12	7	23	52	80	0.650	31	
20	Crystal Palace	42	8	13	21	39	65	0.600	29	
21	Nottingham Forest (R)	42	8	9	25	47	81	0.580	25	Relegation to the Second Division
22	Huddersfield Town (R)	42	6	13	23	27	59	0.458	25	Relegation to the Second Division

Source: World Football
Rules for classification: 1) Points; 2) Goal average; 3) Goals scored
(C) Champions; (R) Relegated

== Results ==
Home \ Away	ARS	CHE	COV	CRY	DER	EVE	HUD	IPS	LEE	LEI	LIV	MCI	MUN	NEW	NOT	SHU	SOU	STK	TOT	WBA	WHU	WOL
Arsenal		3–0	2–0	2–1	2–0	1–1	1–0	2–1	2–0	3–0	0–0	1–2	3–0	4–2	3–0	0–1	1–0	0–1	0–2	2–0	2–1	2–1
Chelsea	1–2		3–3	2–1	1–1	4–0	2–2	2–0	0–0	2–1	0–0	2–2	2–3	3–3	2–0	2–0	3–0	2–0	1–0	1–0	3–1	3–1
Coventry City	0–1	1–1		1–1	2–2	4–1	2–1	1–1	3–1	1–1	0–2	1–1	2–3	1–0	1–1	3–2	1–0	1–1	1–0	0–2	1–1	0–0
Crystal Palace	2–2	2–3	2–2		0–1	2–1	0–0	1–1	1–1	1–1	0–1	1–2	1–3	2–0	1–1	5–1	2–3	2–0	1–1	0–2	0–3	0–2
Derby County	2–1	1–0	1–0	3–0		2–0	3–0	1–0	2–0	3–0	1–0	3–1	2–2	0–1	4–0	3–0	2–2	4–0	2–2	0–0	2–0	2–1
Everton	2–1	2–0	1–2	0–0	0–2		2–2	1–1	0–0	0–0	1–0	1–2	1–0	1–0	1–1	0–1	8–0	0–0	1–1	2–1	2–1	2–2
Huddersfield Town	0–1	1–2	0–1	0–1	2–1	0–0		1–3	2–1	2–2	0–1	1–1	0–3	0–0	0–1	0–0	0–2	0–0	1–1	1–0	1–0	0–1
Ipswich Town	0–1	1–2	3–1	0–2	0–0	0–0	1–0		0–2	1–2	0–0	2–1	0–0	0–0	1–1	0–0	1–1	2–1	2–1	2–3	1–0	2–1
Leeds United	3–0	2–0	1–0	2–0	3–0	3–2	3–1	2–2		2–1	1–0	3–0	5–1	5–1	6–1	1–0	7–0	1–0	1–1	3–0	0–0	0–0
Leicester City	0–0	1–1	1–0	0–0	0–2	0–0	2–0	1–0	0–0		1–0	0–0	2–0	3–0	2–1	0–1	0–1	2–1	0–1	0–1	2–0	1–2
Liverpool	3–2	0–0	3–1	4–1	3–2	4–0	2–0	2–0	0–2	3–2		3–0	2–2	5–0	3–1	2–0	1–0	2–1	0–0	2–0	1–0	3–2
Manchester City	2–0	1–0	4–0	4–0	2–0	1–0	1–0	4–0	0–1	1–1	1–0		3–3	2–1	2–2	2–1	3–0	1–2	4–0	2–1	3–1	5–2
Manchester United	3–1	0–1	2–2	4–0	1–0	0–0	2–0	1–0	0–1	3–2	0–3	1–3		0–2	3–2	2–0	3–2	3–0	3–1	3–1	4–2	1–3
Newcastle United	2–0	0–0	4–2	1–2	0–1	0–0	0–0	0–1	1–0	2–0	3–2	0–0	0–1		2–1	1–2	3–1	0–0	3–1	4–2	2–2	2–0
Nottingham Forest	1–1	2–1	4–0	0–1	0–2	1–0	1–2	0–2	0–2	1–2	2–3	2–2	0–0	1–0		2–3	2–3	0–0	0–1	4–1	1–0	1–3
Sheffield United	0–5	1–0	2–0	1–0	0–4	1–1	3–1	7–0	3–0	1–1	1–1	3–3	1–1	1–0	2–1		3–1	2–3	2–2	0–0	3–0	2–2
Southampton	0–1	2–2	3–1	1–0	1–2	0–1	1–2	0–0	2–1	1–0	0–1	2–0	2–5	1–2	4–1	3–2		3–1	0–0	1–1	3–3	1–2
Stoke City	0–0	0–1	1–0	3–1	1–1	1–1	1–0	3–3	0–3	3–1	0–0	1–3	1–1	3–3	0–2	2–2	3–1		2–0	1–1	0–0	0–1
Tottenham Hotspur	1–1	3–0	1–0	3–0	0–1	3–0	4–1	2–1	1–0	4–3	2–0	1–1	2–0	0–0	6–1	2–0	1–0	2–0		3–2	0–1	4–1
West Bromwich Albion	0–1	4–0	1–1	1–1	0–0	2–0	1–1	1–2	0–1	0–1	1–0	0–2	2–1	0–3	1–0	2–2	3–2	0–1	1–1		0–0	2–3
West Ham United	0–0	2–1	4–0	1–1	3–3	1–0	3–0	0–0	2–2	1–1	0–2	0–2	3–0	0–1	4–2	1–2	1–0	2–1	2–0	0–1		1–0
Wolverhampton Wanderers	5–1	0–2	1–1	1–0	2–1	1–1	2–2	2–2	2–1	0–1	0–0	2–1	1–1	2–0	4–2	1–2	4–2	2–0	2–2	0–1	1–0	

Updated to match(es) played on unknown. Source: Ian Laschke: Rothmans Book of Football League Records 1888–89 to 1978–79. Macdonald and Jane’s, London & Sydney, 1980.
Legend: Blue = home team win; Yellow = draw; Red = away team win.

== Managerial changes ==
Team	Outgoing manager	Manner of departure	Date of vacancy	Position in table	Incoming manager	Date of appointment
Manchester United	(Scotland) Matt Busby	End of caretaker spell	6 June 1971	Pre-season	(Republic of Ireland) Frank O'Farrell	6 June 1971
Leicester City	(Republic of Ireland) Frank O'Farrell	Signed by Manchester United	6 June 1971	Pre-season	(England) Jimmy Bloomfield	23 June 1971
West Bromwich Albion	(England) Alan Ashman	Sacked	1 July 1971	Pre-season	(England) Don Howe	8 July 1971
Manchester City	(England) Joe Mercer	Resigned	7 October 1971	4th	(England) Malcolm Allison	7 October 1971
Coventry City	(Republic of Ireland) Noel Cantwell	Sacked	12 March 1972	18th	(England) Bob Dennison (caretaker)	12 March 1972

== Team locations ==
Locations of the Football League First Division 1971–1972 teams
Locations of the Football League First Division London teams 1971–1972

== Top scorers ==
Rank	Player	Club	Goals
1	(England) Francis Lee	Manchester City	33
2	(England) Martin Chivers	Tottenham Hotspur	25
3	(Scotland) Peter Lorimer	Leeds United	23
=	(England) Malcolm Macdonald	Newcastle United	23
4	(Northern Ireland) George Best	Manchester United	18
=	(England) Ian Storey-Moore	Nottingham Forest / Manchester United	18
=	(England) Peter Osgood	Chelsea	18
5	(England) Tony Brown	West Bromwich Albion	17
=	(Bermuda) Clyde Best	West Ham United	17
