= 1972–73 Football League =

74th season of the Football League

The Football League
- Season: 1972–73
- Champions: Liverpool
- New Club in League: Hereford United

The 1972–73 season was the 74th completed season of The Football League.

Liverpool's championship win meant they claimed their first trophy since 1966 in Bill Shankly's penultimate season as manager despite competition from Arsenal, Leeds United, Ipswich Town and Wolverhampton Wanderers.

Manchester United sacked manager Frank O'Farrell after 18 months in charge. He had been unable to mount a title challenge. Tommy Docherty, the 44-year-old Scottish national coach and former Aston Villa manager, was appointed as his successor. Bobby Charlton and Denis Law both played their last games for the club while George Best's appearances were becoming increasingly rare.

Burnley and Queens Park Rangers won promotion to the First Division. Huddersfield Town's decline continued as they slid into the Third Division, where they were joined by Brighton & Hove Albion.

Bolton Wanderers and Notts County occupied the two promotion places in the Third Division. Rotherham United, Brentford, Swansea City and Scunthorpe United were relegated to the Fourth Division.

Hereford United were promoted from the Fourth Division in their first season as a Football League club. They had been elected to the Football League a year earlier after winning the Southern League and achieving a shock win over Newcastle United in the FA Cup. They were joined in the promotion zone by champions Southport, Cambridge United and Aldershot. Newport County missed promotion only on goal average. There were no arrivals or departures in the league for 1973.

== Final league tables and results ==
The tables below are reproduced here in the exact form that they can be found at The Rec.Sport.Soccer Statistics Foundation website and in Rothmans Book of Football League Records 1888–89 to 1978–79, with home and away statistics separated.

Beginning with the season 1894–95, clubs finishing level on points were separated according to goal average (goals scored divided by goals conceded), or more properly put, goal ratio. In case one or more teams had the same goal difference, this system favoured those teams who had scored fewer goals. The goal average system was eventually scrapped beginning with the 1976–77 season.

Since the Fourth Division was established in the 1958–59 season, the bottom four teams of that division have been required to apply for re-election.

== First Division ==
First Division
- Season: 1972–73
- Champions: Liverpool; 8th title
- Relegated: Crystal Palace; West Bromwich Albion
- European Cup: Liverpool
- UEFA Cup: Leeds United; Ipswich Town; Wolverhampton Wanderers; Tottenham Hotspur
- Watney Cup: West Ham United; Stoke City
- Matches: 462
- Goals: 1,160 (2.51 per match)
- Top goalscorer: Pop Robson (28 goals)
- Biggest home win: Liverpool 5–0 Sheffield United (23 September 1972); Leeds United 5–0 Derby County (7 October 1972); Crystal Palace 5–0 Manchester United (16 October 1972); Derby County 5–0 Arsenal (25 November 1972); Leeds United 6–1 Arsenal (9 March 1973)
- Biggest away win: West Bromwich Albion 0–4 Crystal Palace (3 March 1973)
- Highest scoring: Wolverhampton Wanderers 5–3 Stoke City (30 September 1972)

Pos	Team	Pld	W	D	L	GF	GA	GAv	Pts	Qualification or relegation
1	Liverpool (C)	42	25	10	7	72	42	1.714	60	Qualification for the European Cup first round
2	Arsenal	42	23	11	8	57	43	1.326	57	
3	Leeds United	42	21	11	10	71	45	1.578	53	Qualification for the UEFA Cup first round (Note: Tottenham Hotspur qualified for the UEFA Cup as the Football League Cup winners.)
4	Ipswich Town	42	17	14	11	55	45	1.222	48	Qualification for the UEFA Cup first round
5	Wolverhampton Wanderers	42	18	11	13	66	54	1.222	47	Qualification for the UEFA Cup first round
6	West Ham United	42	17	12	13	67	53	1.264	46	Qualification for the Watney Cup (Note: West Ham United and Stoke City qualified for the Watney Cup as the two teams with the most goals that had not already qualified for a European competition.)
7	Derby County	42	19	8	15	56	54	1.037	46	
8	Tottenham Hotspur	42	16	13	13	58	48	1.208	45	Qualification for the UEFA Cup first round
9	Newcastle United	42	16	13	13	60	51	1.176	45	
10	Birmingham City	42	15	12	15	53	54	0.981	42	
11	Manchester City	42	15	11	16	57	60	0.950	41	
12	Chelsea	42	13	14	15	49	51	0.961	40	
13	Southampton	42	11	18	13	47	52	0.904	40	
14	Sheffield United	42	15	10	17	51	59	0.864	40	
15	Stoke City	42	14	10	18	61	56	1.089	38	Qualification for the Watney Cup
16	Leicester City	42	10	17	15	40	46	0.870	37	
17	Everton	42	13	11	18	41	49	0.837	37	
18	Manchester United	42	12	13	17	44	60	0.733	37	
19	Coventry City	42	13	9	20	40	55	0.727	35	
20	Norwich City	42	11	10	21	36	63	0.571	32	
21	Crystal Palace (R)	42	9	12	21	41	58	0.707	30	Relegation to the Second Division
22	West Bromwich Albion (R)	42	9	10	23	38	62	0.613	28	Relegation to the Second Division

Source: World Football
Rules for classification: 1) Points; 2) Goal average; 3) Goals scored
(C) Champions; (R) Relegated

=== Results ===
Home \ Away	ARS	BIR	CHE	COV	CRY	DER	EVE	IPS	LEE	LEI	LIV	MCI	MUN	NEW	NWC	SHU	SOU	STK	TOT	WBA	WHU	WOL
Arsenal		2–0	1–1	0–2	1–0	0–1	1–0	1–0	2–1	1–0	0–0	0–0	3–1	2–2	2–0	3–2	1–0	2–0	1–1	2–1	1–0	5–2
Birmingham City	1–1		2–2	3–0	1–1	2–0	2–1	1–2	2–1	1–1	2–1	4–1	3–1	3–2	4–1	1–2	1–1	3–1	0–0	3–2	0–0	0–1
Chelsea	0–1	0–0		2–0	0–0	1–1	1–1	2–0	4–0	1–1	1–2	2–1	1–0	1–1	3–1	4–2	2–1	1–3	0–1	3–1	1–3	0–2
Coventry City	1–1	0–0	1–3		2–0	0–2	1–0	2–1	0–1	3–2	1–2	3–2	1–1	0–3	3–1	3–0	1–1	2–1	0–1	0–0	3–1	0–1
Crystal Palace	2–3	0–0	2–0	0–1		0–0	1–0	1–1	2–2	0–1	1–1	1–0	5–0	2–1	0–2	0–1	3–0	3–2	0–0	0–2	1–3	1–1
Derby County	5–0	1–0	1–2	2–0	2–2		3–1	3–0	2–3	2–1	2–1	1–0	3–1	1–1	1–0	2–1	4–0	0–3	2–1	2–0	1–1	3–0
Everton	0–0	1–1	1–0	2–0	1–1	1–0		2–2	1–2	0–1	0–2	2–3	2–0	3–1	2–2	2–1	0–1	2–0	3–1	1–0	1–2	0–1
Ipswich Town	1–2	2–0	3–0	2–0	2–1	3–1	0–1		2–2	0–2	1–1	1–1	4–1	1–0	1–2	1–1	2–2	2–0	1–1	2–0	1–1	2–1
Leeds United	6–1	4–0	1–1	1–1	4–0	5–0	2–1	3–3		3–1	1–2	3–0	0–1	1–0	2–0	2–1	1–0	1–0	2–1	2–0	1–0	0–0
Leicester City	0–1	0–1	1–1	0–0	2–1	0–0	1–2	1–1	2–0		3–2	1–1	2–2	0–0	1–2	0–0	1–0	2–0	0–1	3–1	2–1	1–1
Liverpool	0–2	4–3	3–1	2–0	1–0	1–1	1–0	2–1	2–0	0–0		2–0	2–0	3–2	3–1	5–0	3–2	2–1	1–1	1–0	3–2	4–2
Manchester City	1–2	1–0	0–1	1–2	2–3	4–0	0–1	1–1	1–0	1–0	1–1		3–0	2–0	3–0	3–1	2–1	1–1	2–1	2–1	4–3	1–1
Manchester United	0–0	1–0	0–0	0–1	2–0	3–0	0–0	1–2	1–1	1–1	2–0	0–0		2–1	1–0	1–2	2–1	0–2	1–4	2–1	2–2	2–1
Newcastle United	2–1	3–0	1–1	1–1	2–0	2–0	0–0	1–2	3–2	2–2	2–1	2–1	2–1		3–1	4–1	0–0	1–0	0–1	1–1	1–2	2–1
Norwich City	3–2	1–2	1–0	1–1	2–1	1–0	1–1	0–0	1–2	1–1	1–1	1–1	0–2	0–1		1–1	0–0	2–0	2–1	2–0	0–1	1–1
Sheffield United	1–0	0–1	2–1	3–1	2–0	3–1	0–1	0–0	0–2	2–0	0–3	1–1	1–0	1–2	2–0		3–1	0–0	3–2	3–0	0–0	1–2
Southampton	2–2	2–0	3–1	2–1	2–0	1–1	0–0	1–2	3–1	0–0	1–1	1–1	0–2	1–1	1–0	1–1		1–0	1–1	2–1	0–0	1–1
Stoke City	0–0	1–2	1–1	2–1	2–0	4–0	1–1	1–0	2–2	1–0	0–1	5–1	2–2	2–0	2–0	2–2	3–3		1–1	2–0	2–0	2–0
Tottenham Hotspur	1–2	2–0	0–1	2–1	2–1	1–0	3–0	0–1	0–0	1–1	1–2	2–3	1–1	3–2	3–0	2–0	1–2	4–3		1–1	1–0	2–2
West Bromwich Albion	1–0	2–2	1–1	1–0	0–4	2–1	4–1	2–0	1–1	1–0	1–1	1–2	2–2	2–3	0–1	0–2	1–1	2–1	0–1		0–0	1–0
West Ham United	1–2	2–0	3–1	1–0	4–0	1–2	2–0	0–1	1–1	5–2	0–1	2–1	2–2	1–1	4–0	3–1	4–3	3–2	2–2	2–1		2–2
Wolverhampton Wanderers	1–3	3–2	1–0	3–0	1–1	1–2	4–2	0–1	0–2	2–0	2–1	5–1	2–0	1–1	3–0	1–1	0–1	5–3	3–2	2–0	3–0	

Updated to match(es) played on unknown. Source: Ian Laschke: Rothmans Book of Football League Records 1888–89 to 1978–79. Macdonald and Jane’s, London & Sydney, 1980.
Legend: Blue = home team win; Yellow = draw; Red = away team win.

=== Maps ===
Locations of the Football League First Division London teams 1972–1973
Locations of the Football League First Division 1972–1973 teams

== Second Division ==
Second Division
- Season: 1972–73
- Champions: Burnley
- Promoted: Burnley; Queens Park Rangers
- Relegated: Huddersfield Town; Brighton & Hove Albion
- Cup Winners' Cup: Sunderland; Cardiff City
- Watney Cup: Bristol City; Hull City
- Matches: 462
- Goals: 1,156 (2.5 per match)
- Top goalscorer: Don Givens (23 goals)
- Biggest home win: Carlisle United 6–1 Preston North End (26 December 1972); Queens Park Rangers 5–0 Swindon Town (17 February 1973); Queens Park Rangers 5–0 Portsmouth (31 March 1973)
- Biggest away win: Preston North End 0–5 Portsmouth (10 February 1973)
- Highest scoring: Hull City 6–2 Preston North End (27 January 1973); Blackpool 6–2 Brighton & Hove Albion (19 April 1973)

Pos	Team	Pld	W	D	L	GF	GA	GAv	Pts	Qualification or relegation
1	Burnley (C, P)	42	24	14	4	72	35	2.057	62	Promotion to the First Division
2	Queens Park Rangers (P)	42	24	13	5	81	37	2.189	61	Promotion to the First Division
3	Aston Villa	42	18	14	10	51	47	1.085	50	
4	Middlesbrough	42	17	13	12	46	43	1.070	47	
5	Bristol City	42	17	12	13	63	51	1.235	46	Qualification for the Watney Cup
6	Sunderland	42	17	12	13	59	49	1.204	46	Qualification for the Cup Winners' Cup first round (Note: Sunderland qualified for the Cup Winners' Cup first round as the 1972–73 FA Cup winners.)
7	Blackpool	42	18	10	14	56	51	1.098	46	
8	Oxford United	42	19	7	16	52	43	1.209	45	
9	Fulham	42	16	12	14	58	49	1.184	44	
10	Sheffield Wednesday	42	17	10	15	59	55	1.073	44	
11	Millwall	42	16	10	16	55	47	1.170	42	
12	Luton Town	42	15	11	16	44	53	0.830	41	
13	Hull City	42	14	12	16	64	59	1.085	40	Qualification for the Watney Cup
14	Nottingham Forest	42	14	12	16	47	52	0.904	40	
15	Orient	42	12	12	18	49	53	0.925	36	
16	Swindon Town	42	10	16	16	46	60	0.767	36	
17	Portsmouth	42	12	11	19	42	59	0.712	35	
18	Carlisle United	42	11	12	19	50	52	0.962	34	
19	Preston North End	42	11	12	19	37	64	0.578	34	
20	Cardiff City	42	11	11	20	43	58	0.741	33	Qualification for the Cup Winners' Cup first round (Note: Cardiff City qualified for the Cup Winners' Cup first round as the 1972–73 Welsh Cup winners.)
21	Huddersfield Town (R)	42	8	17	17	36	56	0.643	33	Relegation to the Third Division
22	Brighton & Hove Albion (R)	42	8	13	21	46	83	0.554	29	Relegation to the Third Division

Rules for classification: 1) Points; 2) Goal average; 3) Goals scored
(C) Champions; (P) Promoted; (R) Relegated

=== Results ===
Home \ Away	AST	BLP	B&HA	BRI	BUR	CAR	CRL	FUL	HUD	HUL	LUT	MID	MIL	NOT	ORI	OXF	POR	PNE	QPR	SHW	SUN	SWI
Aston Villa		0–0	1–1	1–0	0–3	2–0	1–0	2–3	2–0	2–0	0–2	1–1	1–0	2–2	1–0	2–1	2–0	1–1	0–1	2–1	2–0	2–1
Blackpool	1–1		6–2	3–0	1–2	1–0	0–0	2–0	1–1	4–3	1–1	0–1	2–1	2–0	1–1	2–1	3–1	2–0	2–0	1–2	0–0	2–0
Brighton & Hove Albion	1–3	1–2		1–1	0–1	2–2	1–0	2–1	2–1	1–1	2–0	0–2	1–3	2–2	2–1	2–2	1–1	2–0	1–2	3–3	2–2	3–1
Bristol City	3–0	3–0	3–1		0–1	1–0	4–1	1–1	0–0	2–1	0–1	1–1	2–2	1–1	2–2	0–0	3–1	2–1	1–2	1–2	1–0	3–0
Burnley	4–1	4–3	3–0	1–1		3–0	2–2	2–2	2–1	4–1	3–0	0–0	2–1	1–0	1–2	1–1	4–0	2–0	1–1	0–1	2–0	2–1
Cardiff City	0–2	1–2	1–1	1–3	0–1		1–0	3–1	4–1	0–2	2–1	2–0	1–0	2–1	3–1	2–0	0–2	3–0	0–0	4–1	1–1	1–1
Carlisle United	2–2	2–3	5–1	1–2	1–1	4–0		2–1	0–0	0–1	2–0	1–1	0–1	1–2	1–0	2–1	1–0	6–1	1–3	1–1	4–3	3–0
Fulham	2–0	2–0	5–1	5–1	1–1	1–1	1–0		1–1	2–0	0–1	2–1	1–0	3–1	1–1	2–0	0–0	1–3	0–2	1–0	1–2	0–0
Huddersfield Town	1–1	1–0	0–2	0–1	0–2	2–1	1–1	1–0		1–3	1–2	1–1	1–0	1–1	1–1	2–0	2–0	0–0	2–2	1–0	1–1	1–1
Hull City	1–2	1–2	2–0	2–0	1–1	1–1	1–1	2–2	0–0		4–0	3–1	0–2	0–0	2–0	0–1	5–1	6–2	4–1	1–1	0–2	3–2
Luton Town	0–0	2–2	2–1	1–3	2–2	1–1	0–1	1–0	4–1	1–2		0–1	2–2	1–0	1–1	0–1	2–2	1–0	2–2	0–0	1–0	0–1
Middlesbrough	1–1	2–0	1–1	2–1	3–3	2–0	1–0	1–2	2–1	1–0	0–1		1–0	0–0	3–2	1–0	3–0	0–0	0–0	3–0	2–1	0–2
Millwall	1–1	1–1	3–0	3–0	1–1	1–1	1–0	1–3	1–0	2–0	3–2	1–0		2–1	2–0	3–1	0–2	4–1	0–1	2–1	0–1	1–1
Nottingham Forest	1–1	4–0	1–0	1–0	3–0	2–1	2–1	2–1	1–1	1–2	0–1	1–3	3–2		2–1	2–1	0–0	0–1	0–0	3–0	1–0	2–2
Orient	4–0	2–0	1–0	0–2	1–1	0–0	2–1	3–2	3–1	0–0	0–1	2–0	3–1	3–0		1–1	0–1	1–2	2–2	3–2	1–1	1–0
Oxford United	2–0	0–1	3–0	0–2	0–2	2–1	1–1	0–0	2–0	5–2	2–1	4–0	2–1	1–0	2–1		1–3	0–2	2–0	1–0	5–1	1–0
Portsmouth	0–1	1–0	2–0	0–3	0–2	3–1	0–0	1–2	1–2	2–2	2–2	0–0	1–1	2–0	1–0	1–0		0–1	0–1	1–0	2–3	1–1
Preston North End	0–1	0–3	4–0	3–3	1–1	0–0	1–0	0–3	0–0	1–0	2–0	0–1	1–0	2–1	0–0	0–1	0–5		1–1	1–1	1–3	1–1
Queens Park Rangers	1–0	4–0	2–0	1–1	2–0	3–0	4–0	2–0	3–1	1–1	2–0	2–2	1–3	3–0	3–1	0–0	5–0	3–0		4–2	3–2	5–0
Sheffield Wednesday	2–2	2–0	1–1	3–2	0–1	1–0	0–0	3–0	3–2	4–2	4–0	2–1	2–2	1–2	2–0	0–1	2–1	2–1	3–1		1–0	2–1
Sunderland	2–2	1–0	4–0	2–2	0–1	2–1	2–1	0–0	3–0	1–1	0–2	4–0	2–0	4–1	1–0	1–0	2–0	0–0	0–3	1–1		3–2
Swindon Town	1–3	0–0	2–2	2–1	0–1	3–0	2–0	2–2	1–1	2–1	0–2	1–0	0–0	0–0	3–1	1–3	1–1	3–2	2–2	1–0	1–1	

Updated to match(es) played on unknown. Source: Ian Laschke: Rothmans Book of Football League Records 1888–89 to 1978–79. Macdonald and Jane’s, London & Sydney, 1980.
Legend: Blue = home team win; Yellow = draw; Red = away team win.

=== Maps ===
Locations of the Football League Second Division London teams 1972–1973
Locations of the Football League Second Division 1972–1973 teams

== Third Division ==
Football League Third Division
- Season: 1972–73
- Champions: Bolton Wanderers (1st title)
- Promoted: Notts County
- Relegated: Brentford, Rotherham United, Scunthorpe United, Swansea City
- Matches: 552
- Goals: 1,371 (2.48 per match)
- Top goalscorer: Arthur Horsfield (Charlton Athletic), 26

Pos	Team	Pld	W	D	L	GF	GA	GAv	Pts	Promotion or relegation
1	Bolton Wanderers (C, P)	46	25	11	10	73	39	1.872	61	Promotion to the Second Division
2	Notts County (P)	46	23	11	12	67	47	1.426	57	Promotion to the Second Division
3	Blackburn Rovers	46	20	15	11	57	47	1.213	55	
4	Oldham Athletic	46	19	16	11	72	54	1.333	54	
5	Bristol Rovers	46	20	13	13	77	56	1.375	53	Qualified for the Watney Cup (Note: The two teams who scored the most goals in each division, and did not qualify for Europe and were not promoted, qualified for the Watney Cup.)
6	Port Vale	46	21	11	14	56	69	0.812	53	
7	Bournemouth	46	17	16	13	66	44	1.500	50	
8	Plymouth Argyle	46	20	10	16	74	66	1.121	50	Qualified for the Watney Cup
9	Grimsby Town	46	20	8	18	67	61	1.098	48	
10	Tranmere Rovers	46	15	16	15	56	52	1.077	46	
11	Charlton Athletic	46	17	11	18	69	67	1.030	45	
12	Wrexham	46	14	17	15	55	54	1.019	45	
13	Rochdale	46	14	17	15	48	54	0.889	45	
14	Southend United	46	17	10	19	61	54	1.130	44	
15	Shrewsbury Town	46	15	14	17	46	54	0.852	44	
16	Chesterfield	46	17	9	20	57	61	0.934	43	
17	Walsall	46	18	7	21	56	66	0.848	43	
18	York City	46	13	15	18	42	46	0.913	41	
19	Watford	46	12	17	17	43	48	0.896	41	
20	Halifax Town	46	13	15	18	43	53	0.811	41	
21	Rotherham United (R)	46	17	7	22	51	65	0.785	41	Relegation to the Fourth Division
22	Brentford (R)	46	15	7	24	51	69	0.739	37	Relegation to the Fourth Division
23	Swansea City (R)	46	14	9	23	51	73	0.699	37	Relegation to the Fourth Division
24	Scunthorpe United (R)	46	10	10	26	33	72	0.458	30	Relegation to the Fourth Division

Source: rsssf.com
(C) Champions; (P) Promoted; (R) Relegated

=== Results ===
Home \ Away	BOU	BLB	BOL	BRE	BRR	CHA	CHF	GRI	HAL	NTC	OLD	PLY	PTV	ROC	ROT	SCU	SHR	STD	SWA	TRA	WAL	WAT	WRE	YOR
AFC Bournemouth		3–0	2–0	3–2	0–0	3–1	2–2	1–1	1–0	1–1	2–0	0–1	4–0	4–2	4–0	1–1	2–0	2–0	2–0	1–1	0–1	3–0	1–0	2–3
Blackburn Rovers	2–1		0–3	2–1	0–0	3–1	0–1	0–0	3–0	2–0	1–1	3–1	0–1	1–1	2–1	3–0	0–0	2–1	3–0	2–2	2–0	0–0	1–1	2–0
Bolton Wanderers	3–0	0–1		2–0	2–0	3–0	1–0	2–0	3–0	2–2	2–1	2–0	2–0	2–1	2–1	0–0	2–0	1–1	3–0	2–0	3–1	1–1	1–0	3–0
Brentford	1–1	4–0	2–1		2–1	1–0	3–1	0–1	0–1	1–1	1–1	0–2	5–0	1–0	1–1	1–0	1–2	1–2	0–2	2–0	2–0	1–1	1–0	2–0
Bristol Rovers	2–0	3–0	1–1	3–1		2–1	2–2	2–1	4–1	1–0	3–3	2–0	4–1	0–0	3–0	5–1	5–1	1–2	3–1	2–0	2–1	2–1	2–0	1–2
Charlton Athletic	1–1	1–2	2–3	2–1	3–3		2–2	1–1	1–0	6–1	4–2	3–0	2–0	1–0	1–2	2–0	1–2	0–0	6–0	1–1	1–1	2–1	2–1	1–0
Chesterfield	1–1	3–1	0–1	3–0	0–1	1–0		2–1	2–0	0–2	4–1	2–2	1–2	2–1	3–2	2–1	2–0	2–4	1–0	2–0	3–0	0–0	1–2	0–0
Grimsby Town	0–1	2–0	2–0	4–0	2–0	0–2	2–1		0–0	3–1	6–2	1–1	0–1	1–0	2–1	1–0	3–2	3–1	2–0	2–0	6–2	2–0	0–1	1–2
Halifax Town	2–0	2–2	1–1	3–2	3–0	3–0	0–1	1–1		0–1	0–3	2–1	2–2	0–0	0–1	1–0	0–1	2–1	1–1	2–1	0–1	1–1	2–2	1–0
Notts County	0–2	0–0	1–0	1–0	2–0	3–1	2–0	4–0	3–0		2–4	2–0	1–1	2–2	2–0	2–0	1–0	2–0	2–0	4–1	1–1	1–0	1–0	1–0
Oldham Athletic	1–1	1–2	2–0	1–1	3–0	0–1	3–0	1–2	1–1	1–1		7–1	1–0	0–0	1–0	3–0	2–1	0–1	2–0	3–1	2–1	2–1	2–2	1–1
Plymouth Argyle	1–0	1–2	1–0	0–1	3–2	5–0	2–2	3–1	2–1	1–4	1–3		2–1	3–2	4–1	3–0	3–0	2–0	3–1	0–1	0–2	1–1	1–0	1–1
Port Vale	2–1	2–1	2–2	1–0	2–1	3–1	2–1	3–0	2–1	1–1	0–2	1–1		0–0	4–1	2–0	1–1	3–1	3–1	0–0	1–2	1–0	3–2	2–1
Rochdale	1–0	0–1	2–2	0–1	0–0	0–2	1–2	3–2	0–0	4–1	0–0	0–6	0–0		0–1	0–2	1–1	3–2	1–1	1–1	2–1	1–0	1–0	1–0
Rotherham United	2–7	1–1	1–0	2–1	1–1	2–1	1–0	2–0	0–1	1–4	2–3	1–0	7–0	0–0		2–1	2–0	1–0	0–2	1–2	2–0	1–0	1–1	1–2
Scunthorpe United	1–1	1–1	1–1	1–0	0–2	0–2	0–1	1–2	0–3	1–0	0–0	1–1	0–1	1–2	2–1		1–0	0–0	1–0	1–5	2–1	1–0	1–1	1–0
Shrewsbury Town	0–0	2–0	0–2	2–0	4–2	0–2	2–0	3–2	0–0	0–0	2–2	1–1	2–3	3–2	1–1	4–2		1–0	2–1	0–0	1–1	0–0	0–0	1–0
Southend	2–2	0–1	1–1	4–0	0–0	1–1	5–1	2–0	1–1	2–1	0–1	3–1	5–0	1–2	1–0	1–0	2–0		3–1	1–0	2–0	0–0	0–1	3–0
Swansea City	1–0	2–2	2–3	2–1	0–2	2–1	2–1	6–2	2–0	3–0	0–0	1–1	0–1	2–3	0–1	2–1	0–2	1–1		1–1	2–1	2–1	3–1	1–3
Tranmere Rovers	0–0	1–1	1–1	6–2	1–1	4–0	1–0	1–1	1–1	0–2	0–1	2–2	2–0	0–1	2–0	2–1	1–0	3–1	1–1		3–1	1–0	4–0	1–0
Walsall	1–0	0–2	3–2	3–0	4–3	3–2	3–2	1–0	0–1	1–3	3–0	1–3	2–0	0–2	1–0	1–1	1–0	3–1	1–1	2–0		1–3	2–0	0–0
Watford	3–2	1–3	2–1	2–2	2–1	1–1	0–0	1–2	2–1	1–0	2–1	3–2	1–1	0–0	1–1	5–1	0–1	1–0	0–1	1–0	1–0		0–0	2–2
Wrexham	1–1	0–0	1–3	4–1	2–2	2–2	1–0	3–2	0–0	2–0	1–1	1–2	5–0	3–3	1–0	1–2	0–0	4–2	1–0	0–0	2–1	1–0		3–1
York City	0–0	1–0	0–1	0–1	0–0	1–1	2–0	0–0	2–1	1–1	0–0	1–2	0–0	1–2	0–1	3–1	2–1	2–0	3–0	4–1	0–0	0–0	1–1	

Updated to match(es) played on unknown. Source: Ian Laschke: Rothmans Book of Football League Records 1888–89 to 1978–79. Macdonald and Jane’s, London & Sydney, 1980.
Legend: Blue = home team win; Yellow = draw; Red = away team win.

=== Maps ===
Locations of the Football League Third Division London teams 1972–1973
Locations of the Football League Third Division teams 1972–1973

== Fourth Division ==
Football League Fourth Division
- Season: 1972–73
- Champions: Southport (1st title)
- Promoted: Aldershot, Cambridge United, Hereford United
- Failed re-election: None
- New club in the league: Hereford United
- Matches: 552
- Goals: 1,347 (2.44 per match)
- Top goalscorer: Fred Binney (Exeter City), 27

Pos	Team	Pld	W	D	L	GF	GA	GAv	Pts	Promotion or relegation
1	Southport (C, P)	46	26	10	10	71	48	1.479	62	Promotion to the Third Division
2	Hereford United (P)	46	23	12	11	56	38	1.474	58	Promotion to the Third Division
3	Cambridge United (P)	46	20	17	9	67	57	1.175	57	Promotion to the Third Division
4	Aldershot (P)	46	22	12	12	60	38	1.579	56	Promotion to the Third Division
5	Newport County	46	22	12	12	64	44	1.455	56	
6	Mansfield Town	46	20	14	12	78	51	1.529	54	Qualified for the Watney Cup (Note: The two teams who scored the most goals in each division, and did not qualify for Europe and were not promoted, qualified for the Watney Cup.)
7	Reading	46	17	18	11	51	38	1.342	52	
8	Exeter City	46	18	14	14	57	51	1.118	50	
9	Gillingham	46	19	11	16	63	58	1.086	49	
10	Lincoln City	46	16	16	14	64	57	1.123	48	
11	Stockport County	46	18	12	16	53	53	1.000	48	
12	Bury	46	14	18	14	58	51	1.137	46	
13	Workington	46	17	12	17	59	61	0.967	46	
14	Barnsley	46	14	16	16	58	60	0.967	44	
15	Chester	46	14	15	17	61	52	1.173	43	
16	Bradford City	46	16	11	19	61	65	0.938	43	
17	Doncaster Rovers	46	15	12	19	49	58	0.845	42	
18	Torquay United	46	12	17	17	44	47	0.936	41	
19	Peterborough United	46	14	13	19	71	76	0.934	41	Qualified for the Watney Cup
20	Hartlepool	46	12	17	17	34	49	0.694	41	
21	Crewe Alexandra	46	9	18	19	38	61	0.623	36	Re-elected
22	Colchester United	46	10	11	25	48	76	0.632	31	Re-elected
23	Northampton Town	46	10	11	25	40	73	0.548	31	Re-elected
24	Darlington	46	7	15	24	42	85	0.494	29	Re-elected

Source: rsssf.com
(C) Champions; (P) Promoted

=== Results ===
Home \ Away	ALD	BAR	BRA	BRY	CAM	CHE	COL	CRE	DAR	DON	EXE	GIL	HAR	HER	LIN	MAN	NPC	NOR	PET	REA	SOU	STP	TOR	WRK
Aldershot		0–2	2–1	2–0	1–1	1–1	2–0	3–0	3–1	1–0	0–0	0–0	2–1	2–0	0–0	0–1	0–2	3–0	2–1	1–0	2–2	2–0	2–1	2–0
Barnsley	0–2		1–2	0–1	3–1	0–0	4–0	2–2	0–2	4–2	1–1	1–1	2–1	0–0	4–1	1–1	2–1	2–0	3–2	0–0	0–1	1–3	0–0	1–0
Bradford City	1–0	3–1		0–0	0–1	0–1	3–0	2–2	7–0	4–3	4–0	3–1	0–2	1–1	3–1	1–1	2–1	2–1	1–4	1–1	0–2	1–0	1–0	2–2
Bury	1–2	2–1	0–0		1–1	1–1	4–0	0–1	1–0	5–0	2–1	2–1	1–1	3–0	0–4	1–0	0–0	2–2	3–1	4–0	0–1	1–2	0–0	3–0
Cambridge United	2–2	1–1	2–1	2–2		1–0	3–0	1–0	0–3	3–1	1–3	3–1	1–1	1–0	2–1	3–2	3–1	3–1	3–1	1–0	2–2	1–0	0–0	1–0
Chester	0–0	0–0	1–1	2–0	1–1		4–0	2–1	5–0	1–2	0–1	1–0	2–0	0–1	2–1	2–2	0–2	3–0	8–2	2–0	0–0	2–0	1–2	1–3
Colchester United	2–3	1–2	0–0	2–1	0–1	2–3		5–1	1–0	1–1	1–2	4–0	1–1	1–0	0–2	1–1	1–3	2–2	1–0	2–2	3–1	3–0	1–1	1–1
Crewe Alexandra	0–2	1–0	1–2	2–1	1–1	1–1	1–2		0–0	0–1	1–0	1–1	2–0	2–1	1–1	0–4	0–0	1–0	0–2	0–0	0–2	0–1	1–1	2–0
Darlington	1–4	0–0	1–0	1–1	3–3	1–1	2–1	3–1		0–1	0–0	2–3	1–2	2–2	1–1	2–3	2–3	0–0	2–2	0–2	0–7	2–0	0–3	2–1
Doncaster Rovers	1–0	0–0	1–0	4–1	0–0	0–0	1–0	0–2	2–0		5–1	0–1	2–1	0–0	1–1	0–1	1–5	3–0	1–1	0–2	2–0	2–2	1–0	1–1
Exeter City	1–0	2–1	5–1	1–1	3–1	0–0	1–0	0–0	1–1	0–1		3–2	1–1	1–0	2–0	4–2	0–0	4–1	1–1	0–0	0–1	3–0	3–2	4–2
Gillingham	1–2	5–1	4–2	2–2	1–2	1–0	2–1	3–2	4–0	3–0	1–0		2–0	2–0	1–1	2–1	0–0	1–3	2–0	1–0	2–0	3–0	1–1	0–2
Hartlepool	1–1	1–4	1–0	1–1	0–0	0–0	2–1	1–1	0–0	0–0	0–0	2–0		0–1	1–0	1–1	1–0	2–0	0–1	1–2	0–2	0–0	1–0	1–0
Hereford United	1–0	1–2	1–0	1–0	2–1	3–1	4–1	1–0	1–0	3–2	1–0	0–0	0–0		2–1	3–1	2–0	2–0	3–0	3–0	2–2	1–0	2–1	0–0
Lincoln City	0–2	1–2	2–1	2–2	2–1	1–0	3–2	1–1	1–0	2–1	2–2	1–0	1–2	4–1		1–1	0–2	1–1	1–0	0–0	3–1	5–3	3–1	1–1
Mansfield Town	2–0	3–1	4–1	1–1	3–1	4–1	1–1	5–1	5–0	0–0	3–0	2–0	2–0	1–1	0–2		0–0	1–0	4–2	1–1	3–3	1–0	2–1	4–0
Newport County	2–1	1–1	0–0	4–3	0–2	3–2	1–0	0–0	0–0	1–0	2–0	5–1	5–1	0–1	2–2	0–1		1–0	1–1	1–0	3–1	1–0	2–1	2–0
Northampton Town	0–2	2–2	1–2	0–1	2–2	1–0	4–0	1–0	2–2	0–2	1–2	2–1	3–1	0–4	0–0	1–0	0–1		1–3	1–1	0–1	1–1	0–2	1–0
Peterborough United	1–0	6–3	3–0	1–1	1–1	2–2	2–2	4–3	1–1	3–1	1–1	0–1	3–0	1–1	2–2	1–0	1–0	1–2		4–2	0–1	2–3	0–1	2–1
Reading	0–0	0–0	2–0	0–0	1–0	2–1	0–1	1–1	1–0	1–0	2–0	3–1	1–0	0–1	1–1	2–0	5–0	3–0	2–0		1–1	0–0	3–0	2–0
Southport	3–1	1–0	3–1	2–1	1–1	3–2	1–0	2–0	2–1	2–2	1–0	0–0	1–1	2–0	1–0	3–1	0–2	1–2	2–1	4–1		1–0	2–1	2–1
Stockport County	1–1	2–0	3–1	0–0	2–2	2–1	2–0	0–0	3–1	2–1	1–0	2–3	0–1	1–1	2–1	2–1	1–0	0–0	3–2	2–2	2–0		2–0	3–0
Torquay United	1–1	0–0	1–2	0–1	1–2	1–2	0–0	0–0	2–1	1–0	0–2	0–0	1–0	0–0	2–0	1–1	2–2	2–1	1–0	2–2	2–0	0–0		3–0
Workington	2–1	3–2	1–1	2–0	5–1	3–1	1–0	1–1	2–1	2–0	3–1	1–1	0–0	2–1	0–3	2–0	3–2	3–0	2–2	0–0	2–0	2–0	2–2	

Updated to match(es) played on unknown. Source: Ian Laschke: Rothmans Book of Football League Records 1888–89 to 1978–79. Macdonald and Jane’s, London & Sydney, 1980.
Legend: Blue = home team win; Yellow = draw; Red = away team win.

=== Maps ===
Locations of the Football League Fourth Division teams 1972–1973

== Attendances ==
=== Division One ===
No.	Club	Average	Highest	Lowest
1	Manchester United	48,623	61,676	36,073
2	Liverpool FC	48,127	56,202	41,550
3	Arsenal FC	40,246	56,194	27,199
4	Birmingham City FC	36,663	51,278	30,757
5	Leeds United FC	35,831	46,468	25,088
6	Everton FC	34,471	54,856	21,806
7	Manchester City FC	32,351	52,086	23,973
8	Tottenham Hotspur FC	32,318	51,291	16,942
9	West Ham United FC	30,174	38,804	23,269
10	Crystal Palace FC	30,167	44,536	17,858
11	Derby County FC	29,766	38,462	20,374
12	Chelsea FC	29,722	51,102	18,279
13	Norwich City FC	28,420	36,688	19,320
14	Newcastle United FC	27,939	38,964	18,103
15	Coventry City FC	24,623	42,911	16,391
16	Wolverhampton Wanderers FC	24,418	34,049	14,888
17	Stoke City FC	23,800	36,063	17,770
18	Sheffield United FC	23,509	40,035	16,231
19	Leicester City FC	22,706	35,876	15,307
20	Ipswich Town FC	22,241	34,636	16,948
21	West Bromwich Albion FC	21,427	39,209	12,147
22	Southampton FC	18,118	24,164	12,125

=== Division Two ===
No.	Club	Average	Highest	Lowest
1	Aston Villa FC	27,693	38,637	15,902
2	Sunderland AFC	22,603	43,265	11,141
3	Sheffield Wednesday FC	17,076	30,394	8,455
4	Queens Park Rangers FC	14,715	22,518	9,790
5	Brighton & Hove Albion FC	14,167	18,699	9,709
6	Burnley FC	14,083	22,852	9,834
7	Bristol City FC	12,892	20,490	10,588
8	Cardiff City FC	11,456	21,982	6,235
9	Blackpool FC	10,782	25,277	5,303
10	Luton Town FC	10,643	15,799	6,177
11	Middlesbrough FC	10,418	24,145	6,816
12	Swindon Town FC	10,267	15,552	7,245
13	Fulham FC	10,267	20,895	6,262
14	Millwall FC	10,265	16,136	7,811
15	Preston North End FC	10,199	21,550	5,759
16	Nottingham Forest FC	9,995	18,082	6,414
17	Portsmouth FC	9,477	16,419	4,688
18	Hull City AFC	9,233	13,580	5,278
19	Oxford United FC	9,197	13,647	4,954
20	Huddersfield Town AFC	8,175	13,689	3,871
21	Carlisle United FC	7,606	17,840	5,517
22	Leyton Orient FC	6,449	10,629	3,887

=== Division Three ===
No.	Club	Average	Highest	Lowest
1	Bolton Wanderers FC	13,928	33,309	5,788
2	AFC Bournemouth	12,268	18,374	8,579
3	Grimsby Town FC	10,849	16,807	7,395
4	Notts County FC	10,701	23,613	6,118
5	Blackburn Rovers FC	9,214	16,346	5,710
6	Plymouth Argyle FC	9,057	20,104	4,768
7	Bristol Rovers FC	8,884	18,567	5,750
8	Brentford FC	8,742	11,803	6,067
9	Oldham Athletic FC	8,256	19,745	4,516
10	Southend United FC	7,329	11,233	4,347
11	Watford FC	6,749	9,241	4,578
12	Chesterfield FC	5,723	8,755	3,508
13	Charlton Athletic FC	5,658	7,375	3,015
14	Tranmere Rovers	5,615	14,356	2,830
15	Port Vale FC	5,429	14,168	3,468
16	Walsall FC	4,803	8,159	3,402
17	Rotherham United FC	4,733	7,045	2,907
18	Wrexham AFC	4,546	6,586	2,611
19	York City FC	3,793	9,894	2,307
20	Scunthorpe United FC	3,736	10,768	1,687
21	Rochdale AFC	3,186	7,168	1,588
22	Swansea City AFC	3,104	5,390	1,607
23	Shrewsbury Town FC	3,004	6,574	1,763
24	Halifax Town AFC	2,741	4,838	970

=== Division Four ===
No.	Club	Average	Highest	Lowest
1	Hereford United FC	8,917	14,849	6,566
2	Reading FC	5,321	10,325	3,721
3	Mansfield Town FC	5,010	7,312	3,451
4	Exeter City FC	4,956	11,296	3,137
5	Newport County AFC	4,817	8,776	2,847
6	Peterborough United FC	4,761	7,577	2,345
7	Lincoln City FC	4,547	6,657	2,429
8	Aldershot Town FC	4,442	10,800	2,761
9	Cambridge United FC	4,227	11,542	2,627
10	Stockport County FC	3,728	5,905	2,204
11	Hartlepool United FC	3,691	7,193	1,887
12	Southport FC	3,580	6,525	1,966
13	Bradford City AFC	3,498	5,566	1,628
14	Torquay United FC	3,300	8,164	1,825
15	Colchester United FC	3,232	6,093	2,437
16	Gillingham FC	3,186	6,115	1,575
17	Bury FC	2,971	4,319	2,039
18	Chester City FC	2,963	4,781	1,390
19	Barnsley FC	2,862	5,900	1,638
20	Northampton Town FC	2,835	5,008	1,180
21	Doncaster Rovers FC	2,259	3,540	1,488
22	Crewe Alexandra FC	2,059	3,820	1,164
23	Darlington FC	1,697	3,724	1,088
24	Workington AFC	1,442	2,065	918

== See also ==
- 1972-73 in English football
