= Leeds Rhinos–Wigan Warriors rivalry =

Rugby league rivalry

Leeds Rhinos–Wigan Warriors rivalry The War of the Roses Derby
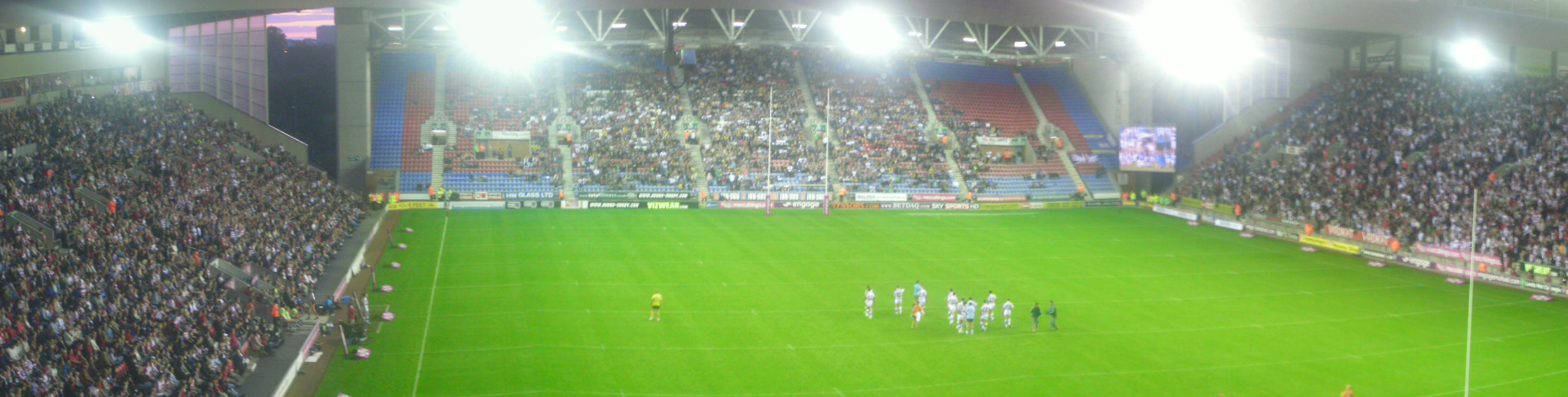
- Post match at a Wigan Leeds game in 2009
- Location: Northern England
- Teams: Leeds Rhinos; Wigan Warriors
- First meeting: 4 January 1896 (Wigan 11–5 Leeds)
- Latest meeting: 5 September 2026; Leeds Rhinos 8-40 Wigan Warriors
- Next meeting: 2027 (Unless sides meet in the 2026 play-offs)
- Stadiums: Headingley; DW Stadium

Statistics
- Total meetings: 277
- Most wins: Wigan (158)

The Leeds Rhinos–Wigan Warriors rivalry, recently branded as the War of the Roses derby, is a rugby league rivalry born from the roses rivalry and strong competitive history between the clubs with them both being considered two of the best in England.

== History ==
Locations of Leeds Rhinos and Wigan Warriors.

The rivalry between Leeds Rhinos and Wigan Warriors is the primary representation of the roses rivalry in rugby league. Both clubs are the most decorated in their respective counties and have 35 league championships between them to date (beaten only by the collective haul of St Helens and Wigan Warriors at 41). The rivalry has been described as the most underrated rivalry in British rugby league, and having the grounds to be placed with the aforementioned Good Friday Derby between St Helens and Wigan and the Hull Derby. The rivalry was not present in the early years of rugby league, despite both clubs being founder members of the NRFU, with Leeds not winning their first league title until 1961. From then, the competitive rivalry started to intensify, but it wasn't until Wigan's period of dominance in the late 80s and 90s then Leeds's dominance in the late 00s and early 10s which saw both teams win the treble in their respective periods and the rivalry become what it is today.

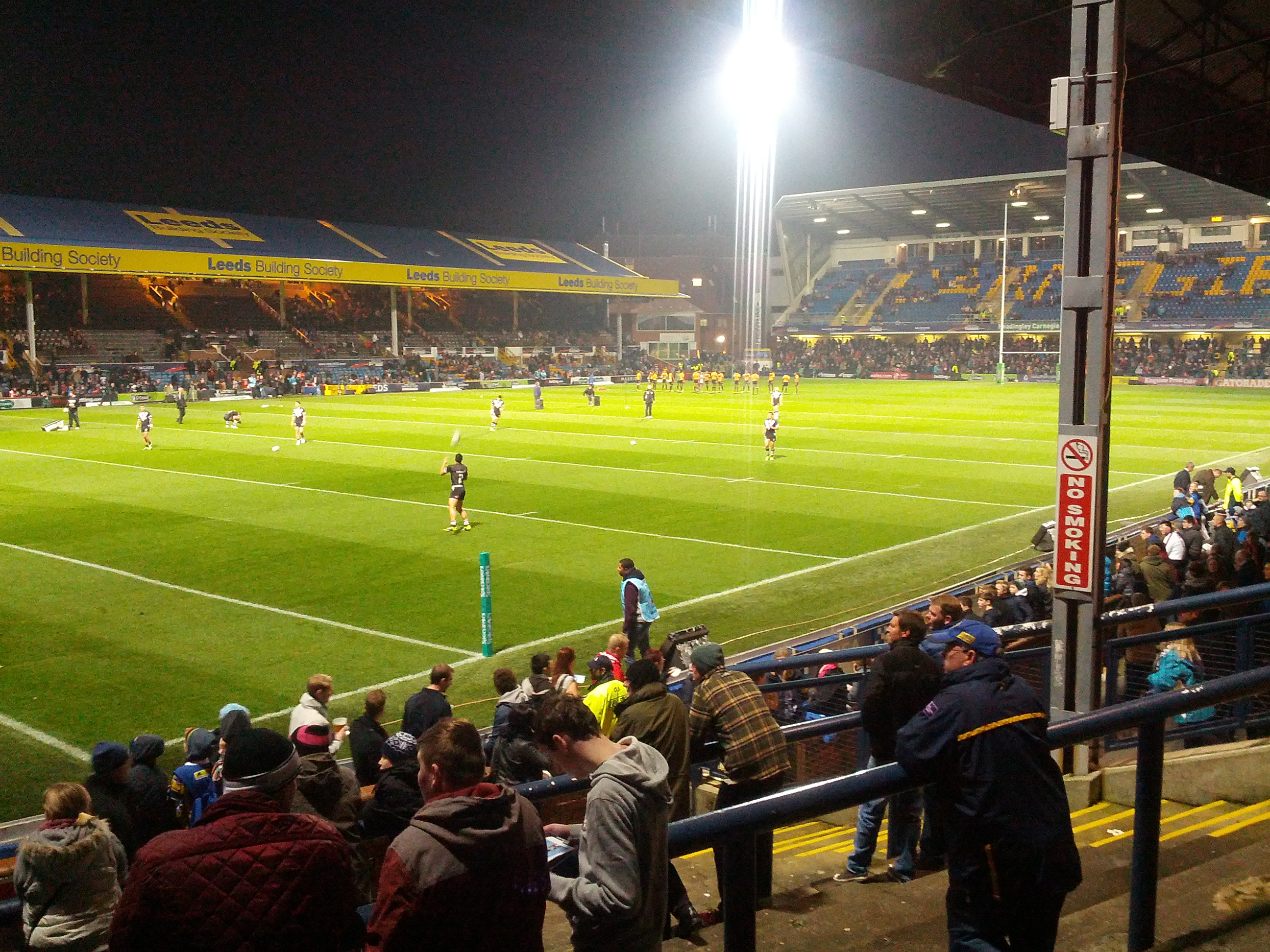
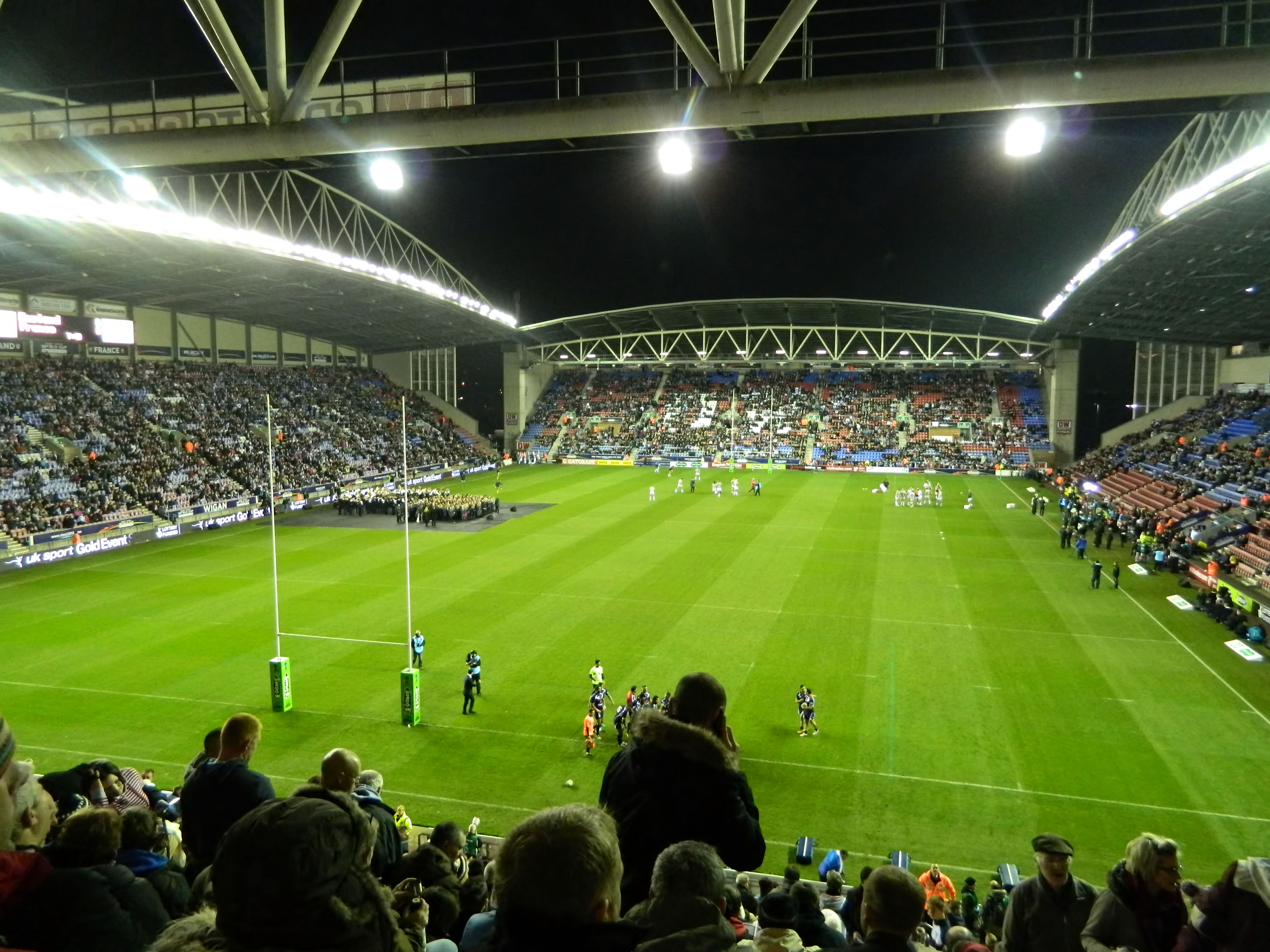
Headingley (left) and the DW Stadium (right) are the homes of Leeds Rhinos and Wigan Warriors.

=== Name ===
Since the discontinuation of the county origin series War of the Roses in 2003, the Leeds-Wigan rivalry has seemingly inherited the name in the years since only adding to the rivalry's intensity. As representatives of the largest city in their respective counties (Leeds and Manchester), the term "Roses Derby" is often used to describe derby matches from theses cities. The term has been used to describe matches in football and cricket, with the term deriving from the War of the Roses between the House of Lancaster and the House of York.

== Head to Head ==
Statistics correct as of 05/09/2026

In all competitions, competitive and uncompetitive:

Played	Leeds	Drawn	Wigan
276	107	8	158

=== Meetings in major finals ===
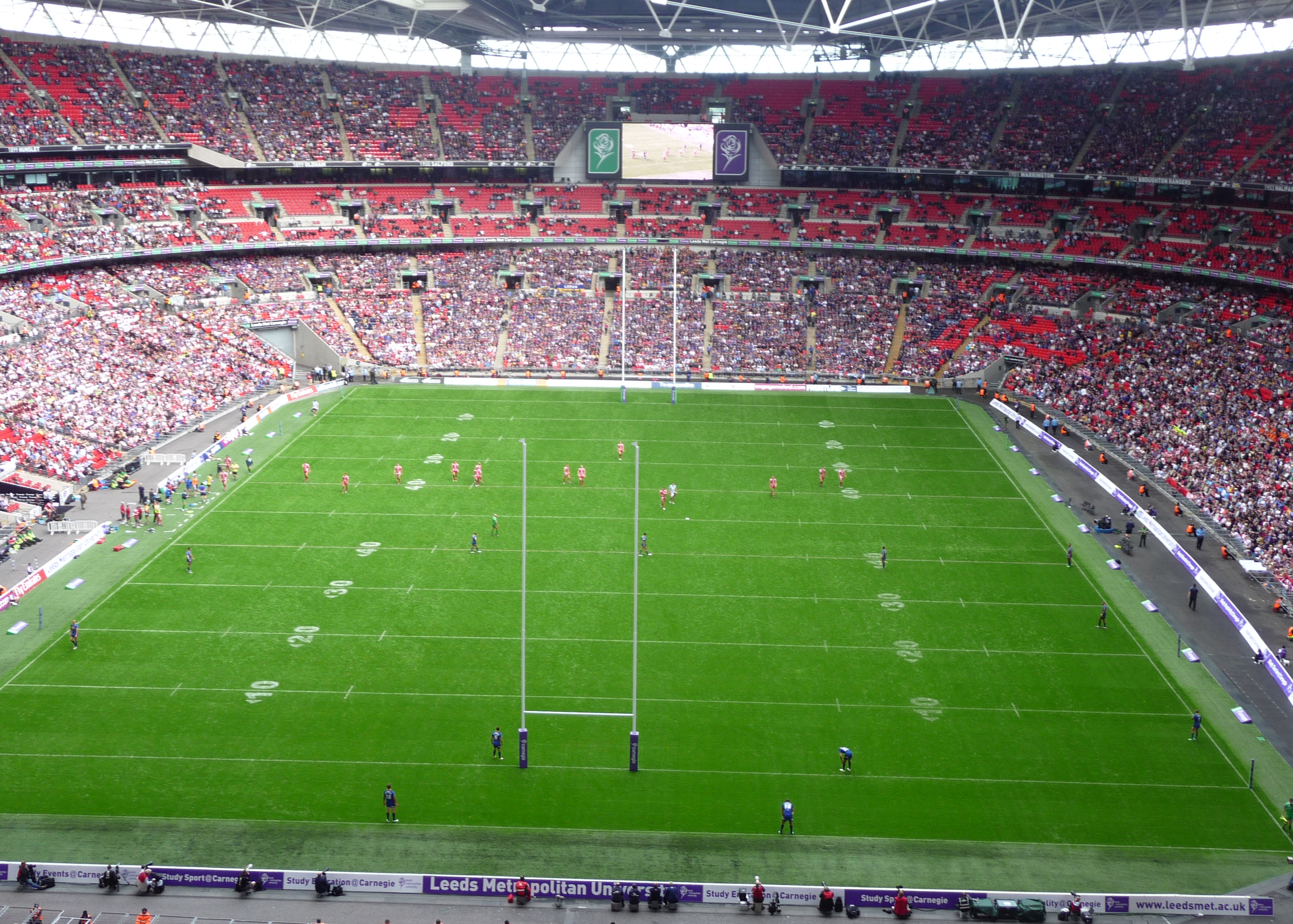
Leeds Rhinos and Wigan Warriors contest the 2011 Challenge Cup Final at Wembley Stadium

- 1982–83 League Cup Final: Wigan 15–4 Leeds
- 1993–94 Challenge Cup Final: Wigan 26–16 Leeds
- 1994–95 Challenge Cup Final: Wigan 30–10 Leeds
- 1994–95 Premiership Final: Wigan 69–12 Leeds
- 1995–96 Charity Shield: Wigan 45–20 Leeds
- 1998 Super League Grand Final: Wigan 10–4 Leeds
- 2011 Challenge Cup Final: Wigan 28–18 Leeds
- 2015 Super League Grand Final: Leeds 22–20 Wigan

== Collective Honours ==
As of the 2024 Super League Grand Final.

Leeds Rhinos		Honour	Wigan Warriors	
Rank	No.	Honour	No.	Rank
3rd	11	League Championships	24	1st
3rd	9	League Leaders	23	1st
2nd	14	Challenge Cup	21	1st
4th	2	Premiership	6	1st
2nd	4	League Cup	8	1st
—N/a	0	Charity Shield	4	1st
3rd	3	World Club Challenge	5	1st
1st	15	Yorkshire / Lancashire League	18	1st
1st	17	Yorkshire / Lancashire Cup	21	1st
5th	1	BBC2 Floodlit Trophy	1	5th

== See also ==
- Derbies in the Rugby Football League
- Roses rivalry
