= 1973–74 Football League =

75th season of the Football League

The Football League
- Season: 1973–74
- Champions: Leeds United

The 1973–74 season was the 75th completed season of The Football League.

Don Revie marked his last season as Leeds United's manager by guiding them to league championship glory, before taking over from Sir Alf Ramsey as the England national football team manager, with England having failed to qualify for the 1974 World Cup. Revie's conquering side had a two-horse race with Liverpool all season but won in the end, taking the title for the second time in their history by five points. Newly promoted Burnley adapted well to life back in the top flight, finishing in sixth place.

Manchester United were relegated from the First Division just six years after winning the European Cup at the end of a traumatic season. Their 36-year stay at the top was finally ended by a 1–0 home defeat against Manchester City. Former United striker Denis Law scored City's winning goal. But Birmingham City's win on that same afternoon would have sent United down even if they had beaten City. Despite this the board kept faith in manager Tommy Docherty as the man to regain the club's top flight place.

Joining United in the Second Division were Norwich City and Southampton. This was the first season in which the League introduced three relegation places from the top division.

Former Leeds player Jack Charlton had a fine debut in management by guiding Middlesbrough to the Second Division title and a place in the First Division. Second in the table were Luton Town, who finished 15 points behind the runaway champions. Third-placed Carlisle United, managed by Alan Ashman (who won the FA Cup with West Bromwich Albion in 1968), gained a place in the First Division for the first, and so far only, time in their history, completing a rapid rise from the Fourth Division to the First Division. Crystal Palace, Preston North End and Swindon Town were all relegated.

Promotion from the Third Division was secured by champions Oldham Athletic, Bristol Rovers and York City, which at the time represented York's highest ever League finish. Cambridge United, Shrewsbury Town, Southport and Rochdale were all relegated.

Peterborough United won Division Four and were promoted along with Gillingham, Colchester United and Bury. The league's re-election system voted in favour of the bottom four league clubs and there were no departures or arrivals in the league in 1974.

== Final league tables and results ==
The tables below are reproduced here in the exact form that they can be found at The Rec.Sport.Soccer Statistics Foundation website and in Rothmans Book of Football League Records 1888–89 to 1978–79, with home and away statistics separated.

Beginning with the season 1894–95, clubs finishing level on points were separated according to goal average (goals scored divided by goals conceded), or more properly put, goal ratio. In case one or more teams had the same goal difference, this system favoured those teams who had scored fewer goals. The goal average system was eventually scrapped beginning with the 1976–77 season.

This season marked the introduction of relegating the bottom three teams in the league, replacing the previous system in which only the bottom two were relegated, in place since automatic promotion/relegation was introduced in the 1898-99 season. Since the Fourth Division was established in the 1958–59 season, the bottom four teams of that division have been required to apply for re-election.

Match results are drawn from Rothmans for all divisions.

== First Division ==
First Division
- Season: 1973–74
- Champions: Leeds United; 2nd title
- Relegated: Southampton; Manchester United; Norwich City
- European Cup: Leeds United
- Cup Winners' Cup: Liverpool
- UEFA Cup: Derby County; Ipswich Town; Stoke City; Wolverhampton Wanderers
- Matches: 462
- Goals: 1,107 (2.4 per match)
- Top goalscorer: Mick Channon (21 goals)
- Biggest home win: Ipswich Town 7–0 Southampton (2 February 1974)
- Biggest away win: Norwich City 0–4 Arsenal (15 September 1973)
- Highest scoring: Derby County 6–2 Southampton (22 September 1973)

1973 - 74 was the final season for the long-serving managers of two of the First Division's leading clubs. Both are regarded as having transformed their clubs on and off the field during lengthy reigns lasting more than a decade. Don Revie guided Leeds United to the title before calling time of 13 years as manager at Elland Road to take charge of the England team. Bill Shankly announced his retirement as Liverpool manager after 15 years after they finished second in the league and triumphed 3–0 over Newcastle United in the FA Cup Final.

Despite the controversial resignation of manager Brian Clough in October, Derby County finished third after their former player Dave Mackay returned to the Baseball Ground as Clough's successor. Ipswich Town continued to thrive among the First Division's leading company by finishing fourth in their fifth campaign under Bobby Robson. Stoke City enjoyed another strong season, finishing fifth, with England goalkeeper Peter Shilton keeping opposition strikers at bay after his predecessor Gordon Banks retired due to an eye injury suffered in a car crash. Burnley enjoyed a strong return to the First Division after two seasons away by finishing sixth.

Manchester United's 36-year spell in the First Division ended in relegation, while their cross-city rivals finished 14th and were beaten in the Football League Cup final by Wolverhampton Wanderers. Southampton's eight-year spell in the First Division ended in relegation despite 21 goals from the division's top scorer Mick Channon and a change of manager from Ted Bates to Lawrie McMenemy before Christmas. Norwich City's second season among the elite ended in relegation.

Pos	Team	Pld	W	D	L	GF	GA	GAv	Pts	Qualification or relegation
1	Leeds United (C)	42	24	14	4	66	31	2.129	62	Qualification for the European Cup first round
2	Liverpool	42	22	13	7	52	31	1.677	57	Qualification for the Cup Winners' Cup first round (Note: Liverpool qualified for the Cup Winners' Cup first round as the 1973-74 FA Cup winners.)
3	Derby County	42	17	14	11	52	42	1.238	48	Qualification for the UEFA Cup first round
4	Ipswich Town	42	18	11	13	67	58	1.155	47	Qualification for the UEFA Cup first round
5	Stoke City	42	15	16	11	54	42	1.286	46	Qualification for the UEFA Cup first round
6	Burnley	42	16	14	12	56	53	1.057	46	
7	Everton	42	16	12	14	50	48	1.042	44	
8	Queens Park Rangers	42	13	17	12	56	52	1.077	43	
9	Leicester City	42	13	16	13	51	41	1.244	42	
10	Arsenal	42	14	14	14	49	51	0.961	42	
11	Tottenham Hotspur	42	14	14	14	45	50	0.900	42	
12	Wolverhampton Wanderers	42	13	15	14	49	49	1.000	41	Qualification for the UEFA Cup first round
13	Sheffield United	42	14	12	16	44	49	0.898	40	
14	Manchester City	42	14	12	16	39	46	0.848	40	
15	Newcastle United	42	13	12	17	49	48	1.021	38	
16	Coventry City	42	14	10	18	43	54	0.796	38	
17	Chelsea	42	12	13	17	56	60	0.933	37	
18	West Ham United	42	11	15	16	55	60	0.917	37	
19	Birmingham City	42	12	13	17	52	64	0.813	37	
20	Southampton (R)	42	11	14	17	47	68	0.691	36	Relegation to the Second Division
21	Manchester United (R)	42	10	12	20	38	48	0.792	32	Relegation to the Second Division
22	Norwich City (R)	42	7	15	20	37	62	0.597	29	Relegation to the Second Division

Source: World Football
Rules for classification: 1) Points; 2) Goal average; 3) Goals scored
(C) Champions; (R) Relegated

=== Results ===
Home \ Away	ARS	BIR	BUR	CHE	COV	DER	EVE	IPS	LEE	LEI	LIV	MCI	MUN	NEW	NWC	QPR	SHU	SOU	STK	TOT	WHU	WOL
Arsenal		1–0	1–1	0–0	2–2	2–0	1–0	1–1	1–2	0–2	0–2	2–0	3–0	0–1	2–0	1–1	1–0	1–0	2–1	0–1	0–0	2–2
Birmingham	3–1		2–2	2–4	1–0	0–0	0–2	0–3	1–1	3–0	1–1	1–1	1–0	1–0	2–1	4–0	1–0	1–1	0–0	1–2	3–1	2–1
Burnley	2–1	2–1		1–0	2–2	1–1	3–1	0–1	0–0	0–0	2–1	3–0	0–0	1–1	1–0	2–1	1–2	3–0	1–0	2–2	1–1	1–1
Chelsea	1–3	3–1	3–0		1–0	1–1	3–1	2–3	1–2	3–2	0–1	1–0	1–3	1–0	3–0	3–3	1–2	4–0	0–1	0–0	2–4	2–2
Coventry City	3–3	0–1	1–1	2–2		1–0	1–2	0–1	0–0	1–2	1–0	2–1	1–0	2–2	1–0	0–1	3–1	2–0	2–0	1–0	0–1	1–0
Derby County	1–1	1–1	5–1	1–0	1–0		2–1	2–0	0–0	2–1	3–1	1–0	2–2	1–0	1–1	1–2	4–1	6–2	1–1	2–0	1–1	2–0
Everton	1–0	4–1	1–0	1–1	1–0	2–1		3–0	0–0	1–1	0–1	2–0	1–0	1–1	4–1	1–0	1–1	0–3	1–1	1–1	1–0	2–1
Ipswich Town	2–2	3–0	3–2	1–1	3–0	3–0	3–0		0–3	1–1	1–1	2–1	2–1	1–3	1–1	1–0	0–1	7–0	1–1	0–0	1–3	2–0
Leeds United	3–1	3–0	1–4	1–1	3–0	2–0	3–1	3–2		1–1	1–0	1–0	0–0	1–1	1–0	2–2	0–0	2–1	1–1	1–1	4–1	4–1
Leicester City	2–0	3–3	2–0	3–0	0–2	0–1	2–1	5–0	2–2		1–1	1–1	1–0	1–0	3–0	2–0	1–1	0–1	1–1	3–0	0–1	2–2
Liverpool	0–1	3–2	1–0	1–0	2–1	2–0	0–0	4–2	1–0	1–1		4–0	2–0	2–1	1–0	2–1	1–0	1–0	1–0	3–2	1–0	1–0
Manchester City	1–2	3–1	2–0	3–2	1–0	1–0	1–1	1–3	0–1	2–0	1–1		0–0	2–1	2–1	1–0	0–1	1–1	0–0	0–0	2–1	1–1
Manchester United	1–1	1–0	3–3	2–2	2–3	0–1	3–0	2–0	0–2	1–2	0–0	0–1		1–0	0–0	2–1	1–2	0–0	1–0	0–1	3–1	0–0
Newcastle United	1–1	1–1	1–2	2–0	5–1	0–2	2–1	3–1	0–1	1–1	0–0	1–0	3–2		0–0	2–3	1–0	0–1	2–1	0–2	1–1	2–0
Norwich City	0–4	2–1	1–0	2–2	0–0	2–4	1–3	1–2	0–1	1–0	1–1	1–1	0–2	1–1		0–0	2–1	2–0	4–0	1–1	2–2	1–1
Queens Park Rangers	2–0	2–2	2–1	1–1	3–0	0–0	1–0	0–1	0–1	0–0	2–2	3–0	3–0	3–2	1–2		0–0	1–1	3–3	3–1	0–0	0–0
Sheffield United	5–0	1–1	0–2	1–2	0–1	3–0	1–1	0–3	0–2	1–1	1–0	1–2	0–1	1–1	1–0	1–1		4–2	0–0	2–2	1–0	1–0
Southampton	1–1	0–2	2–2	0–0	1–1	1–1	2–0	2–0	1–2	1–0	1–0	0–2	1–1	3–1	2–2	2–2	3–0		3–0	1–1	1–1	2–1
Stoke City	0–0	5–2	4–0	1–0	3–0	0–0	0–0	1–1	3–2	1–0	1–1	1–1	1–0	2–1	2–0	4–1	1–2	4–1		1–0	2–0	2–3
Tottenham Hotspur	2–0	4–2	2–3	1–2	2–1	1–0	0–2	1–1	0–3	1–0	1–1	0–2	2–1	0–2	0–0	0–0	1–2	3–1	2–1		2–0	1–3
West Ham United	1–3	0–0	0–1	3–0	2–3	0–0	4–3	3–3	3–1	1–1	2–2	2–1	2–1	1–2	4–2	2–3	2–2	4–1	0–2	0–1		0–0
Wolverhampton Wanderers	3–1	1–0	0–2	2–0	1–1	4–0	1–1	3–1	0–2	1–0	0–1	0–0	2–1	1–0	3–1	2–4	2–0	2–1	1–1	1–1	0–0	

Updated to match(es) played on unknown. Source: Ian Laschke: Rothmans Book of Football League Records 1888–89 to 1978–79. Macdonald and Jane’s, London & Sydney, 1980.
Legend: Blue = home team win; Yellow = draw; Red = away team win.

=== Maps ===
Locations of the Football League First Division London teams 1973–1974
Locations of the Football League First Division 1973–1974 teams

== Second Division ==
Second Division
- Season: 1973–74
- Champions: Middlesbrough
- Promoted: Middlesbrough; Luton Town; Carlisle United
- Relegated: Crystal Palace; Preston North End; Swindon Town
- Cup Winners' Cup: Cardiff City
- Matches: 462
- Goals: 1,106 (2.39 per match)
- Top goalscorer: Duncan McKenzie (26 goals)
- Biggest home win: Middlesbrough 8–0 Sheffield Wednesday (20 April 1974)
- Biggest away win: Fulham 0–4 Middlesbrough (9 Mar 1974); Notts County 1–5 Sheffield Wednesday (9 March 1974); West Bromwich Albion 0–4 Middlesbrough (16 March 1974)
- Highest scoring: Middlesbrough 8–0 Sheffield Wednesday (20 April 1974)

Jack Charlton started his managerial career by guiding Middlesbrough to the Second Division title and a place in the First Division. Middlesbrough finished 15 points above runners-up Luton Town, who ended their 14-year exile from the elite despite financial difficulties. The final promotion place was snatched by Carlisle United, who reached the First Division for the first time in their history. Orient missed out on promotion by a single point. Other teams who just missed out on promotion included Nottingham Forest, Sunderland and West Bromwich Albion.

Crystal Palace were relegated for a second successive season, while Preston North End went down in their first season under the management of the legendary Bobby Charlton, who then re-registered himself as a player in his efforts to reverse the decline of the once great Lancashire club. Swindon Town went down in bottom place after five seasons in the Second Division.

Pos	Team	Pld	W	D	L	GF	GA	GAv	Pts	Qualification or relegation
1	Middlesbrough (C, P)	42	27	11	4	77	30	2.567	65	Promotion to the First Division
2	Luton Town (P)	42	19	12	11	64	51	1.255	50	Promotion to the First Division
3	Carlisle United (P)	42	20	9	13	61	48	1.271	49	Promotion to the First Division
4	Orient	42	15	18	9	55	42	1.310	48	
5	Blackpool	42	17	13	12	57	40	1.425	47	
6	Sunderland	42	19	9	14	58	44	1.318	47	
7	Nottingham Forest	42	15	15	12	57	43	1.326	45	
8	West Bromwich Albion	42	14	16	12	48	45	1.067	44	
9	Hull City	42	13	17	12	46	47	0.979	43	
10	Notts County	42	15	13	14	55	60	0.917	43	
11	Bolton Wanderers	42	15	12	15	44	40	1.100	42	
12	Millwall	42	14	14	14	51	51	1.000	42	
13	Fulham	42	16	10	16	39	43	0.907	42	
14	Aston Villa	42	13	15	14	48	45	1.067	41	
15	Portsmouth	42	14	12	16	45	62	0.726	40	
16	Bristol City	42	14	10	18	47	54	0.870	38	
17	Cardiff City	42	10	16	16	49	62	0.790	36	Qualification for the Cup Winners' Cup first round
18	Oxford United	42	10	16	16	35	46	0.761	36	
19	Sheffield Wednesday	42	12	11	19	51	63	0.810	35	
20	Crystal Palace (R)	42	11	12	19	43	56	0.768	34	Relegation to the Third Division
21	Preston North End (R)	42	9	14	19	40	62	0.645	31	Relegation to the Third Division
22	Swindon Town (R)	42	7	11	24	36	72	0.500	25	Relegation to the Third Division

Rules for classification: 1) Points; 2) Goal average; 3) Goals scored
(C) Champions; (P) Promoted; (R) Relegated

=== Results ===
Home \ Away	AST	BLP	BOL	BRI	CAR	CRL	CRY	FUL	HUL	LUT	MID	MIL	NOT	NTC	ORI	OXF	POR	PNE	SHW	SUN	SWI	WBA
Aston Villa		0–1	1–1	2–2	5–0	2–1	2–1	1–1	1–1	0–1	1–1	0–0	3–1	1–1	2–2	2–0	4–1	2–0	1–0	1–2	1–1	1–3
Blackpool	2–1		0–2	2–2	2–1	4–0	1–0	2–0	1–2	3–0	0–0	1–0	2–2	0–1	1–1	2–0	5–0	3–0	0–0	0–2	2–0	2–3
Bolton Wanderers	1–2	1–1		2–1	1–1	2–0	2–0	0–0	1–0	1–0	2–1	0–1	1–0	1–3	1–1	2–1	4–0	0–2	4–2	1–0	2–0	1–1
Bristol City	0–1	0–1	1–0		3–2	2–0	0–1	0–1	3–1	1–3	1–1	5–2	1–0	2–2	0–2	0–0	0–2	0–0	2–0	2–0	1–0	1–1
Cardiff City	0–1	1–0	1–0	0–1		2–2	1–1	0–0	1–3	0–0	3–2	1–3	1–1	1–0	1–1	5–0	1–1	2–0	0–1	4–1	2–1	0–1
Carlisle United	2–0	2–3	1–0	2–1	1–1		1–0	3–0	4–0	2–0	1–1	1–1	2–1	3–0	3–0	2–1	0–2	2–2	2–2	1–0	5–1	0–1
Crystal Palace	0–0	1–2	0–0	3–1	3–3	0–1		0–2	0–2	1–2	2–3	1–1	0–1	1–4	0–0	2–0	0–0	2–0	0–0	3–0	4–2	1–0
Fulham	1–0	0–0	1–0	2–1	0–1	0–2	1–3		0–0	2–1	0–4	2–0	2–0	2–0	0–3	3–1	2–0	0–0	4–1	0–2	4–1	0–0
Hull City	1–1	1–0	0–0	2–1	1–1	1–1	3–0	2–0		1–3	1–3	1–1	0–0	1–0	1–1	0–0	4–1	1–0	2–1	2–0	0–1	0–0
Luton Town	1–0	3–0	2–1	1–0	1–0	6–1	2–1	1–1	2–2		0–1	3–0	2–2	1–1	3–1	0–1	3–3	4–2	2–1	3–4	2–1	0–2
Middlesbrough	0–0	0–0	0–0	2–0	3–0	1–0	2–0	0–2	1–0	2–1		2–1	1–0	4–0	3–2	1–0	3–0	3–0	8–0	2–1	2–1	0–0
Millwall	1–1	2–2	2–1	0–2	2–0	1–2	3–2	1–0	3–0	0–1	0–1		0–0	0–0	0–1	0–0	1–1	5–1	1–0	2–1	3–0	1–0
Nottingham Forest	1–2	2–0	3–2	1–1	2–1	2–0	1–2	3–0	0–0	4–0	5–1	3–0		0–0	2–1	1–1	2–0	1–1	2–1	2–2	2–0	1–4
Notts County	2–0	0–3	0–0	2–1	1–1	0–3	1–3	2–1	3–2	1–1	2–2	3–3	0–1		2–4	0–0	4–0	2–1	1–5	1–4	2–0	1–0
Orient	1–1	3–2	3–0	0–1	1–2	0–1	3–0	1–0	1–1	2–0	0–0	1–1	2–1	1–1		1–1	2–1	2–2	0–1	2–1	0–0	2–0
Oxford United	2–1	2–2	0–2	5–0	4–2	0–1	1–1	0–0	1–1	1–1	0–2	0–3	1–0	2–1	1–1		3–0	1–1	1–0	0–1	1–1	1–0
Portsmouth	2–0	0–0	0–2	1–0	1–0	2–1	2–2	3–0	3–1	0–0	0–1	0–0	0–2	1–2	0–0	2–1		3–0	1–1	1–1	3–1	1–1
Preston North End	0–0	1–3	2–1	1–1	2–2	0–1	1–1	0–1	2–0	2–2	2–4	2–0	2–1	0–2	0–1	0–0	2–1		0–0	1–0	1–1	3–1
Sheffield Wednesday	2–4	0–0	1–0	3–1	5–0	1–0	4–0	0–3	1–1	2–2	2–2	3–2	1–1	0–0	1–2	0–1	1–2	1–0		0–1	2–1	3–1
Sunderland	2–0	2–1	3–0	1–2	1–1	2–1	0–0	1–0	1–0	0–1	0–2	4–0	0–0	1–2	1–1	0–0	3–0	2–1	3–1		4–1	1–1
Swindon Town	1–0	1–0	2–2	0–1	1–1	2–2	0–1	1–1	1–1	0–2	0–1	1–3	0–0	1–4	2–2	1–0	1–2	3–1	3–1	0–2		1–0
West Bromwich Albion	2–0	1–1	0–0	2–2	2–2	1–1	1–0	2–0	2–3	1–1	0–4	1–1	3–3	2–1	1–0	1–0	1–2	0–2	2–0	1–1	2–0	

Updated to match(es) played on unknown. Source: Ian Laschke: Rothmans Book of Football League Records 1888–89 to 1978–79. Macdonald and Jane’s, London & Sydney, 1980.
Legend: Blue = home team win; Yellow = draw; Red = away team win.

=== Maps ===
Locations of the Football League Second Division London teams 1973–1974
Locations of the Football League Second Division 1973–1974 teams

== Third Division ==
Football League Third Division
- Season: 1973–74
- Champions: Oldham Athletic (1st title)
- Promoted: Bristol Rovers; York City
- Relegated: Cambridge United; Rochdale; Shrewsbury Town; Southport
- Matches: 552
- Goals: 1,362 (2.47 per match)
- Top goalscorer: Billy Jennings (Watford), 26

Pos	Team	Pld	W	D	L	GF	GA	GAv	Pts	Promotion or relegation
1	Oldham Athletic (C, P)	46	25	12	9	83	47	1.766	62	Promotion to the Second Division
2	Bristol Rovers (P)	46	22	17	7	65	33	1.970	61	Promotion to the Second Division
3	York City (P)	46	21	19	6	67	38	1.763	61	Promotion to the Second Division
4	Wrexham	46	22	12	12	63	43	1.465	56	
5	Chesterfield	46	21	14	11	55	42	1.310	56	
6	Grimsby Town	46	18	15	13	67	50	1.340	51	
7	Watford	46	19	12	15	64	56	1.143	50	
8	Aldershot	46	19	11	16	65	52	1.250	49	
9	Halifax Town	46	14	21	11	48	51	0.941	49	
10	Huddersfield Town	46	17	13	16	56	55	1.018	47	
11	Bournemouth	46	16	15	15	54	58	0.931	47	
12	Southend United	46	16	14	16	62	62	1.000	46	
13	Blackburn Rovers	46	18	10	18	62	64	0.969	46	
14	Charlton Athletic	46	19	8	19	66	73	0.904	46	
15	Walsall	46	16	13	17	57	48	1.188	45	
16	Tranmere Rovers	46	15	15	16	50	44	1.136	45	
17	Plymouth Argyle	46	17	10	19	59	54	1.093	44	
18	Hereford United	46	14	15	17	53	57	0.930	43	
19	Brighton & Hove Albion	46	16	11	19	52	58	0.897	43	
20	Port Vale	46	14	14	18	52	58	0.897	42	
21	Cambridge United (R)	46	13	9	24	48	81	0.593	35	Relegation to the Fourth Division
22	Shrewsbury Town (R)	46	10	11	25	41	62	0.661	31	Relegation to the Fourth Division
23	Southport (R)	46	6	16	24	35	82	0.427	28	Relegation to the Fourth Division
24	Rochdale (R)	46	2	17	27	38	94	0.404	21	Relegation to the Fourth Division

Source: rsssf.com
(C) Champions; (P) Promoted; (R) Relegated

=== Results ===
Home \ Away	BOU	ALD	BLB	B&HA	BRR	CAM	CHA	CHF	GRI	HAL	HER	HUD	OLD	PLY	PTV	ROC	SHR	STD	SOU	TRA	WAL	WAT	WRE	YOR
AFC Bournemouth		3–0	1–2	0–0	0–3	1–0	1–0	0–1	1–1	1–1	3–2	1–0	0–3	0–0	2–2	2–0	1–0	1–3	2–0	2–1	1–0	1–0	0–1	1–3
Aldershot	1–3		4–0	0–1	2–3	6–0	2–1	2–2	1–0	2–1	1–0	1–0	0–1	3–2	0–0	4–0	2–2	3–3	4–0	0–0	1–0	1–0	5–1	2–2
Blackburn Rovers	4–3	1–2		3–1	0–2	2–0	1–1	2–1	1–0	1–1	1–2	1–0	0–1	2–0	1–1	3–1	2–0	1–0	2–1	0–0	0–2	5–0	1–2	4–0
Brighton & Hove Albion	0–2	0–1	3–0		2–8	4–1	1–2	0–0	1–1	0–1	2–1	1–2	1–2	1–0	2–1	2–1	2–0	0–2	4–0	1–3	2–1	0–1	2–1	0–0
Bristol Rovers	3–0	2–1	3–0	1–1		1–0	2–1	1–0	1–1	2–0	1–1	2–1	1–2	4–2	1–1	1–1	1–0	4–0	3–1	1–0	0–2	1–0	1–0	0–0
Cambridge United	2–1	1–2	0–2	1–1	2–2		1–0	1–2	0–1	0–1	2–0	2–2	1–1	3–1	4–2	3–3	2–1	3–2	2–0	1–0	0–0	3–2	2–1	0–0
Charlton Athletic	0–0	2–0	4–3	0–4	1–1	2–0		3–3	2–1	5–2	2–0	2–1	4–1	2–0	2–0	3–0	3–3	2–1	0–1	1–0	0–1	1–3	0–0	2–4
Chesterfield	2–1	0–0	3–0	1–0	0–0	3–0	3–1		1–0	1–1	1–1	0–2	1–0	1–0	2–1	1–0	0–2	0–0	4–2	1–0	1–0	3–1	2–2	0–2
Grimsby Town	1–1	1–0	4–2	0–0	1–1	1–0	5–0	1–1		4–1	1–3	2–1	2–1	3–0	2–0	5–1	1–2	2–1	2–1	5–0	1–0	2–2	1–1	1–2
Halifax Town	1–1	0–0	1–1	2–2	0–0	0–1	2–1	2–0	1–2		1–1	0–0	0–0	1–0	1–0	1–0	1–0	0–0	1–1	2–1	3–1	0–0	1–2	2–1
Hereford United	0–2	0–2	1–0	3–0	0–0	0–0	2–3	2–1	2–1	3–1		0–1	3–4	0–1	2–1	2–1	1–1	1–2	3–0	0–2	3–1	1–1	2–0	0–0
Huddersfield Town	1–1	1–0	1–0	2–2	1–2	2–1	2–0	1–0	1–0	4–0	0–0		2–1	2–1	3–0	5–0	1–0	0–1	3–1	0–0	2–2	1–2	2–1	0–1
Oldham Athletic	4–2	2–0	2–3	0–1	1–1	6–1	0–2	0–0	3–1	3–2	1–1	6–0		1–0	1–1	3–1	3–0	2–0	6–0	2–2	2–1	0–3	0–0	2–1
Plymouth Argyle	2–0	2–1	2–1	0–1	1–0	4–1	1–0	1–1	1–0	1–1	0–1	1–1	0–0		2–0	5–0	2–2	1–1	4–1	2–0	2–1	2–0	1–2	0–2
Port Vale	0–0	0–1	1–2	2–1	3–1	2–1	3–1	0–1	1–1	1–1	1–3	4–2	3–0	2–1		3–1	3–0	0–0	2–1	1–0	1–1	1–2	1–0	2–2
Rochdale	3–3	2–2	1–2	1–1	0–1	0–2	1–1	1–2	1–1	1–1	1–1	1–1	1–3	1–3	1–1		3–2	1–1	2–2	0–1	0–1	1–3	0–0	1–3
Shrewsbury Town	1–1	0–0	3–0	1–0	0–2	2–0	3–3	0–1	1–1	0–2	1–1	3–0	0–2	0–0	0–1	2–0		1–2	2–0	1–3	0–0	3–2	0–1	0–2
Southend	2–2	2–1	1–1	0–2	0–0	3–1	2–0	1–3	4–1	1–2	2–1	5–2	2–2	2–0	1–0	1–2	2–0		0–1	1–1	2–1	2–3	1–1	3–3
Southport	1–0	3–0	2–2	1–1	1–0	0–0	1–2	1–1	0–1	1–1	1–1	0–0	0–2	1–1	0–1	0–0	1–0	0–0		2–2	1–1	1–1	0–2	1–1
Tranmere	1–1	0–1	1–1	4–1	0–0	5–2	2–0	1–2	0–0	0–1	0–0	1–1	0–2	2–0	3–0	1–1	1–0	2–0	3–1		3–0	1–0	0–1	0–0
Walsall	1–2	3–2	2–0	0–1	0–0	3–0	4–0	2–0	3–1	2–2	3–1	3–0	1–1	0–4	0–0	0–0	2–0	1–2	2–0	0–1		2–2	3–0	0–0
Watford	1–1	2–1	0–0	1–0	0–0	3–0	1–3	2–1	1–2	0–0	2–1	1–1	0–1	0–3	2–1	4–0	1–0	1–0	4–0	4–2	1–3		2–0	1–1
Wrexham	0–1	0–0	2–2	1–0	1–0	2–1	4–0	2–1	1–1	2–1	5–0	0–0	1–2	5–2	0–0	3–0	3–1	5–1	3–2	0–0	2–0	1–0		1–0
York City	4–1	3–1	1–0	3–0	2–1	2–0	0–1	0–0	1–1	1–1	0–0	2–1	1–1	1–1	3–1	2–1	0–1	1–0	4–0	2–0	1–1	2–2	1–0	

Updated to match(es) played on unknown. Source: Ian Laschke: Rothmans Book of Football League Records 1888–89 to 1978–79. Macdonald and Jane’s, London & Sydney, 1980.
Legend: Blue = home team win; Yellow = draw; Red = away team win.

=== Maps ===
Locations of the Football League Third Division London teams 1973–1974
Locations of the Football League Third Division teams 1973–1974

== Fourth Division ==
Football League Fourth Division
- Season: 1973–74
- Champions: Peterborough United (2nd title)
- Promoted: Bury; Colchester United; Gillingham
- Failed re-election: None
- Matches: 552
- Goals: 1,362 (2.47 per match)
- Top goalscorer: Brian Yeo (Gillingham), 31

Pos	Team	Pld	W	D	L	GF	GA	GAv	Pts	Promotion or relegation
1	Peterborough United (C, P)	46	27	11	8	75	38	1.974	65	Promotion to the Third Division
2	Gillingham (P)	46	25	12	9	90	49	1.837	62	Promotion to the Third Division
3	Colchester United (P)	46	24	12	10	73	36	2.028	60	Promotion to the Third Division
4	Bury (P)	46	24	11	11	81	49	1.653	59	Promotion to the Third Division
5	Northampton Town	46	20	13	13	63	48	1.313	53	
6	Reading	46	16	19	11	58	37	1.568	51	
7	Chester	46	17	15	14	54	55	0.982	49	
8	Bradford City	46	17	14	15	58	52	1.115	48	
9	Newport County	46	16	14	16	56	65	0.862	45 (Note: Newport County had one point deducted for fielding an ineligible player.)	
10	Exeter City	45	18	8	19	58	55	1.055	44 (Note: Scunthorpe United v. Exeter was never played; Exeter failed to turn up and Scunthorpe were awarded the points.)	
11	Hartlepool	46	16	12	18	48	47	1.021	44	
12	Lincoln City	46	16	12	18	63	67	0.940	44	
13	Barnsley	46	17	10	19	58	64	0.906	44	
14	Swansea City	46	16	11	19	45	46	0.978	43	
15	Rotherham United	46	15	13	18	56	58	0.966	43	
16	Torquay United	46	13	17	16	52	57	0.912	43	
17	Mansfield Town	46	13	17	16	62	69	0.899	43	
18	Scunthorpe United	45	14	12	19	47	64	0.734	42	
19	Brentford	46	12	16	18	48	50	0.960	40	
20	Darlington	46	13	13	20	40	62	0.645	39	
21	Crewe Alexandra	46	14	10	22	43	71	0.606	38	Re-elected
22	Doncaster Rovers	46	12	11	23	47	80	0.588	35	Re-elected
23	Workington	46	11	13	22	43	74	0.581	35	Re-elected
24	Stockport County	46	7	20	19	44	69	0.638	34	Re-elected

Source: rsssf.com
(C) Champions; (P) Promoted

=== Results ===
Home \ Away	BAR	BRA	BRE	BRY	CHE	COL	CRE	DAR	DON	EXE	GIL	HAR	LIN	MAN	NPC	NOR	PET	REA	ROT	SCU	STP	SWA	TOR	WRK
Barnsley		2–2	2–1	3–2	1–1	0–1	2–1	1–0	2–0	3–0	3–1	2–0	0–1	1–1	1–1	0–2	0–0	3–2	1–0	5–0	4–0	1–0	1–0	4–0
Bradford City	3–0		1–1	4–2	1–1	1–1	0–1	3–0	1–1	1–0	0–0	2–0	4–0	3–1	3–0	1–1	1–1	4–3	2–1	2–1	0–1	3–1	2–1	3–2
Brentford	5–1	2–0		1–2	3–0	0–0	3–0	0–0	2–0	0–1	0–3	1–2	2–1	4–1	1–1	3–1	0–1	0–1	1–1	2–1	0–0	0–2	0–0	1–1
Bury	2–0	3–0	3–0		3–1	2–0	2–0	5–1	3–1	0–0	3–2	1–0	2–1	2–0	5–0	3–1	0–2	1–0	3–1	0–0	1–1	0–2	4–0	3–1
Chester	3–1	1–0	0–0	1–1		0–4	1–0	1–0	3–0	0–1	2–4	3–1	2–3	1–1	3–0	0–0	2–1	0–0	1–0	2–0	2–1	1–0	1–1	1–0
Colchester United	2–0	4–0	2–1	1–1	1–1		3–2	3–0	3–0	1–0	0–2	3–0	4–1	1–0	4–1	1–0	1–1	0–0	0–1	2–0	3–1	2–0	2–2	3–0
Crewe Alexandra	0–1	1–0	0–0	1–0	1–0	1–2		1–1	4–0	2–5	1–0	1–3	2–1	1–1	4–1	0–2	2–1	2–1	1–8	1–0	1–3	0–0	0–0	1–0
Darlington	4–2	2–1	1–2	0–0	1–2	1–0	3–0		1–0	1–0	1–3	1–1	0–3	1–0	0–1	2–3	2–2	2–1	1–1	3–0	1–1	1–1	0–0	0–0
Doncaster Rovers	1–0	2–2	1–2	1–1	1–2	2–0	0–2	0–0		1–0	1–2	2–2	2–0	0–0	2–0	2–1	3–1	0–0	1–2	1–0	1–1	3–1	0–1	5–2
Exeter City	6–1	0–0	2–1	0–3	2–1	1–0	2–0	3–0	1–2		2–1	2–0	0–1	1–1	0–1	1–1	1–2	0–1	0–0	4–0	2–1	2–0	4–2	1–1
Gillingham	1–1	2–0	1–0	3–0	1–0	4–1	3–0	0–1	5–1	2–1		3–0	2–0	2–2	1–1	3–1	1–0	0–1	1–1	7–2	2–1	1–1	2–1	4–0
Hartlepool	1–2	1–0	1–0	1–1	0–0	0–0	1–0	1–2	3–0	1–3	2–1		0–2	4–0	0–1	1–0	0–1	1–2	2–0	3–0	3–0	0–1	0–0	3–0
Lincoln City	1–1	0–1	3–2	4–3	2–2	0–1	4–2	2–1	3–3	2–1	2–3	0–1		1–1	3–0	1–1	1–1	0–2	2–1	1–0	1–1	2–2	3–0	2–0
Mansfield Town	2–2	0–0	1–1	1–2	3–0	2–2	1–2	1–0	2–0	3–3	2–2	2–0	4–3		2–1	2–0	2–1	1–1	3–0	2–2	5–0	2–1	2–1	2–0
Newport County	1–0	2–2	1–1	1–0	0–2	1–3	4–2	2–0	3–1	2–1	3–3	0–0	0–1	2–0		3–1	0–1	0–0	1–0	2–1	3–1	2–1	2–2	4–0
Northampton Town	2–1	3–0	0–0	3–1	3–3	0–0	1–1	5–0	3–1	1–2	0–0	1–0	1–0	2–0	1–0		0–1	3–3	3–1	2–0	2–0	2–0	0–0	1–0
Peterborough United	3–0	1–1	1–0	2–2	0–0	2–0	4–0	1–0	5–1	2–0	4–2	2–0	1–0	2–1	2–0	3–0		2–0	2–0	1–0	3–2	3–0	1–1	2–0
Reading	1–0	0–0	1–0	2–2	3–0	1–1	2–0	2–0	5–0	4–1	0–1	1–1	0–0	3–0	1–1	1–2	1–1		1–0	0–0	1–1	1–2	4–0	2–0
Rotherham United	2–1	2–1	1–1	1–0	3–2	0–0	1–1	0–1	1–2	4–0	1–1	2–2	2–0	2–1	1–1	1–2	3–1	1–1		1–1	1–2	1–0	1–0	1–1
Scunthorpe United	3–0	2–1	4–1	1–2	2–1	1–0	0–0	1–0	2–1		1–1	1–1	1–1	5–3	0–0	1–2	2–1	1–0	3–0		2–1	0–0	0–0	0–1
Stockport County	1–1	0–1	1–1	3–2	0–1	0–3	0–0	1–2	0–0	0–1	2–0	1–1	2–2	1–1	1–1	2–2	1–1	0–0	0–1	3–1		0–1	2–1	1–1
Swansea City	2–0	0–1	0–0	0–1	2–0	2–0	2–0	0–0	0–0	2–0	0–3	0–0	3–0	2–0	1–1	1–1	0–2	2–1	4–2	1–2	3–0		0–1	1–0
Torquay United	1–1	1–0	3–0	1–2	2–2	0–4	2–1	0–0	3–0	0–0	0–1	0–2	2–1	4–0	3–2	1–0	1–2	1–1	3–0	1–1	2–2	3–1		3–0
Workington	1–0	1–0	0–2	0–0	1–1	1–4	0–0	5–2	3–1	3–1	3–3	0–2	1–1	0–0	3–2	1–0	4–1	0–0	0–2	1–2	1–1	1–0	3–1	

Updated to match(es) played on unknown. Source: Ian Laschke: Rothmans Book of Football League Records 1888–89 to 1978–79. Macdonald and Jane’s, London & Sydney, 1980.
Legend: Blue = home team win; Yellow = draw; Red = away team win.
- Scunthorpe United v Exeter City was never played; Exeter failed to turn up and Scunthorpe were awarded two points.

=== Maps ===
Locations of the Football League Fourth Division teams 1973–1974

== Attendances ==
=== Division One ===
No.	Club	Average	Highest	Lowest
1	Manchester United	42,712	60,025	28,589
2	Liverpool FC	42,332	56,003	21,656
3	Leeds United FC	38,666	47,058	26,778
4	Everton FC	35,351	56,098	21,747
5	Birmingham City FC	33,048	50,451	23,767
6	Newcastle United FC	32,861	55,638	19,470
7	Manchester City FC	30,756	51,331	21,590
8	Arsenal FC	30,212	50,699	13,482
9	West Ham United FC	28,394	38,416	16,513
10	Derby County FC	27,788	36,003	23,348
11	Tottenham Hotspur FC	26,124	42,756	14,034
12	Chelsea FC	25,983	40,768	8,171
13	Wolverhampton Wanderers FC	25,609	36,980	19,350
14	Leicester City FC	24,825	36,978	15,786
15	Coventry City FC	23,280	35,206	16,457
16	Norwich City FC	23,023	31,798	17,673
17	Sheffield United FC	22,917	39,972	10,832
18	Queens Park Rangers FC	22,867	35,353	12,422
19	Ipswich Town FC	22,381	33,292	15,457
20	Stoke City FC	21,587	39,687	13,843
21	Southampton FC	21,128	30,789	14,572
22	Burnley FC	20,670	40,087	13,169

=== Division Two ===
No.	Club	Average	Highest	Lowest
1	Sunderland AFC	24,409	41,658	8,142
2	Aston Villa FC	23,413	37,323	12,007
3	Middlesbrough FC	22,264	37,030	14,742
4	Crystal Palace FC	21,797	32,648	16,124
5	West Bromwich Albion FC	15,990	43,029	11,498
6	Bolton Wanderers FC	15,942	23,614	8,692
7	Sheffield Wednesday FC	14,645	23,634	7,865
8	Nottingham Forest FC	14,398	29,962	9,498
9	Bristol City FC	14,058	25,904	9,570
10	Portsmouth FC	13,675	20,062	8,669
11	Luton Town FC	12,214	20,285	4,908
12	Preston North End FC	12,174	21,747	7,650
13	Notts County FC	11,911	32,310	6,975
14	Leyton Orient FC	11,793	29,766	7,216
15	Cardiff City FC	10,714	27,139	5,999
16	Fulham FC	10,129	23,511	4,973
17	Blackpool FC	10,120	18,575	5,508
18	Millwall FC	9,516	20,176	5,906
19	Oxford United FC	8,302	13,714	5,248
20	Carlisle United FC	8,270	19,692	5,096
21	Hull City AFC	8,216	17,409	5,348
22	Swindon Town FC	7,299	14,222	2,791

=== Division Three ===
No.	Club	Average	Highest	Lowest
1	Bristol Rovers FC	13,026	22,363	7,405
2	Brighton & Hove Albion FC	10,864	18,900	5,297
3	Oldham Athletic FC	10,118	18,528	5,716
4	AFC Bournemouth	8,981	17,079	4,475
5	Hereford United FC	8,040	12,501	3,810
6	Plymouth Argyle FC	7,743	13,004	5,078
7	Blackburn Rovers FC	7,432	10,989	3,520
8	Grimsby Town FC	7,419	10,883	5,244
9	York City FC	6,885	15,829	2,929
10	Watford FC	6,683	10,202	5,358
11	Southend United FC	6,472	10,276	3,956
12	Wrexham AFC	5,957	9,883	3,534
13	Chesterfield FC	5,777	11,559	3,287
14	Huddersfield Town AFC	5,696	11,514	2,522
15	Charlton Athletic FC	5,306	11,414	3,245
16	Aldershot Town FC	5,235	13,259	1,742
17	Walsall FC	4,789	9,035	3,037
18	Cambridge United FC	4,377	7,749	1,979
19	Tranmere Rovers	4,215	6,872	2,650
20	Port Vale FC	3,959	8,505	2,556
21	Halifax Town AFC	2,849	8,126	1,346
22	Southport FC	2,547	9,504	1,083
23	Shrewsbury Town FC	2,502	5,680	1,232
24	Rochdale AFC	1,891	5,923	588

=== Division Four ===
No.	Club	Average	Highest	Lowest
1	Peterborough United FC	8,824	17,569	6,161
2	Gillingham FC	7,502	12,577	3,864
3	Reading FC	6,477	12,480	3,277
4	Colchester United FC	5,427	10,007	3,468
5	Northampton Town FC	5,424	11,378	3,137
6	Brentford FC	5,063	8,717	3,166
7	Bury FC	4,879	8,813	2,878
8	Barnsley FC	4,254	8,511	2,274
9	Exeter City FC	4,186	6,822	2,226
10	Lincoln City FC	3,930	7,150	1,800
11	Bradford City AFC	3,797	9,041	2,098
12	Rotherham United FC	3,410	6,243	2,334
13	Torquay United FC	3,392	9,265	2,014
14	Mansfield Town FC	3,160	6,924	1,909
15	Scunthorpe United FC	3,029	5,775	1,887
16	Newport County AFC	3,023	5,888	1,685
17	Swansea City AFC	2,815	6,712	1,301
18	Hartlepool United FC	2,721	6,739	844
19	Chester City FC	2,682	6,272	1,687
20	Doncaster Rovers FC	2,395	5,955	1,163
21	Stockport County FC	2,380	4,050	1,311
22	Darlington FC	2,334	4,527	1,326
23	Crewe Alexandra FC	1,921	3,259	1,302
24	Workington AFC	1,179	1,763	693

== See also ==
- 1973-74 in English football
