= Football Fans Census =

- Company type: Private Limited Company
- Industry: Market Research
- Founded: 2002
- Headquarters: London, England
- Parent: Football Fans Central Ltd
- Website: footballfanscensus.com

Football Fans Census (sometimes known as FFC), is the trading name of Football Fans Central Ltd, a small market research company which specialises in research into the views and opinions of English football supporters.

When the free-to-air digital sports channel ITV Digital collapsed in 2002; it reportedly owed £178.5m to Football League clubs. Two football fans began a campaign for ITV Digital's parent entities, the regional ITV companies Granada Television and Carlton Television to repay this money to the clubs.

The campaign, under the name Football Fans Union, took the form of a protest against the companies resulting in the 'Can the Commercials' petition and direct action. The group asked football fans to boycott ITV's World Cup 2002 coverage, and in particular to switch channels during advertisements; so that advertisers would bring pressure on ITV and impact on the companies' advertising revenues.

The fans' campaign ran alongside legal action by the Football League; but it proved to be unsuccessful when the Court of Appeal threw out the Football League's action in 2006.

The impetus created by this campaign led to the Football Fans Union developing into the Football Fans Census; and a desire to be a voice for football supporters through online surveys and opinion polls.

Past surveys include:

- the return of terraces
- the quality of food at games
- the cost of following a football team
- the state of English football
