= Roses rivalry =

Lancashire and Yorkshire rivalry in England

The red rose of Lancaster and the white rose of York

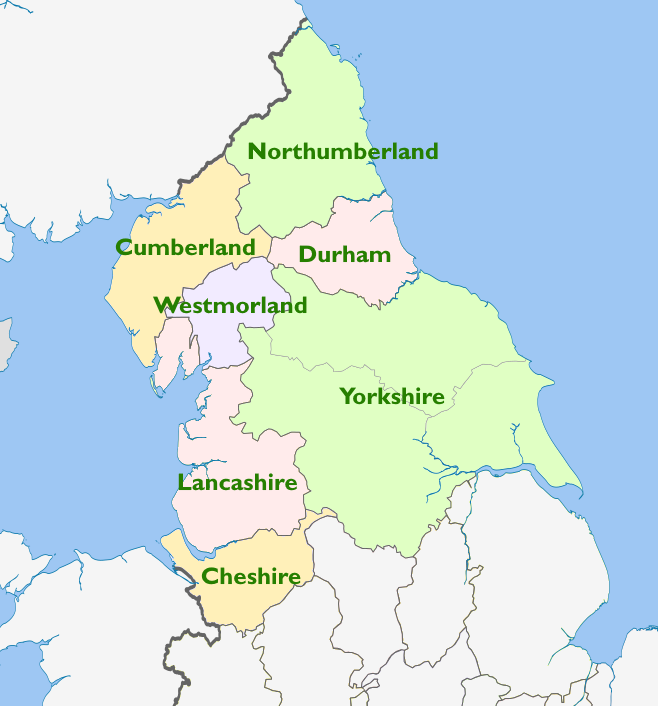
This map of Northern England shows the historic boundaries of the counties of Lancashire (centre-left) and Yorkshire (centre-right)

The term "Roses rivalry" refers to the rivalry between the English counties of Lancashire and Yorkshire. The rivalry originated in the aftermath of the Wars of the Roses (1455–1487) which was fought between the House of Lancaster and the House of York. The roses rivalry is still present to this day.

== In culture ==
While the rivalry is more subtle in day-to-day life than in the past, it still remains strong in the population.

British tea companies Yorkshire Tea and Lancashire Tea have been compared as "arch rivals".

Glyn Hughes wrote in 1975: "Frequently Lancashire people find Yorkshire people unfriendly or Yorkshire people find Lancashire people so. 'Yorkshire is all hills and moors; Lancashire is all mills and whores' is one definition of the differences between the counties".

== In sport ==
The term is also used to describe various sporting fixtures competed by representatives of the two sides:

- Cricket: Roses Match – between Lancashire CCC and Yorkshire CCC.
- Football: Roses Derby – between Leeds United and Manchester United.
  - Also describes games between other traditional East Lancashire and West Yorkshire clubs; Bradford City vs Burnley, Halifax Town vs Rochdale, and Huddersfield Town vs Oldham Athletic being well known examples.
- Rugby League: War of the Roses – was an annual rugby league match played between Lancashire and Yorkshire.
  - More recently, the term has described the rivalry between Leeds Rhinos and Wigan Warriors.
  - Similar to in football, Roses Derbies exist in rugby league, between traditional East Lancashire clubs of Oldham and Rochdale, and West Yorkshire clubs of Huddersfield and Halifax.
- University Varsity: Roses Tournament – an annual varsity tournament between the students of Lancaster University and the University of York.

== Inspirations ==
The closely located American cities of Lancaster and York in Pennsylvania share a rivalry of the same name. Both cities are named after their British counterparts, and share sporting rivalries in baseball (in the Atlantic League of Professional Baseball) and in high school American football.

== See also ==
- Liverpool–Manchester rivalry – the rivalry between the two cities located in the historic county of Lancashire.
