= Leeds United F.C.–Manchester United F.C. rivalry =

Football rivalry

Leeds United v Manchester United
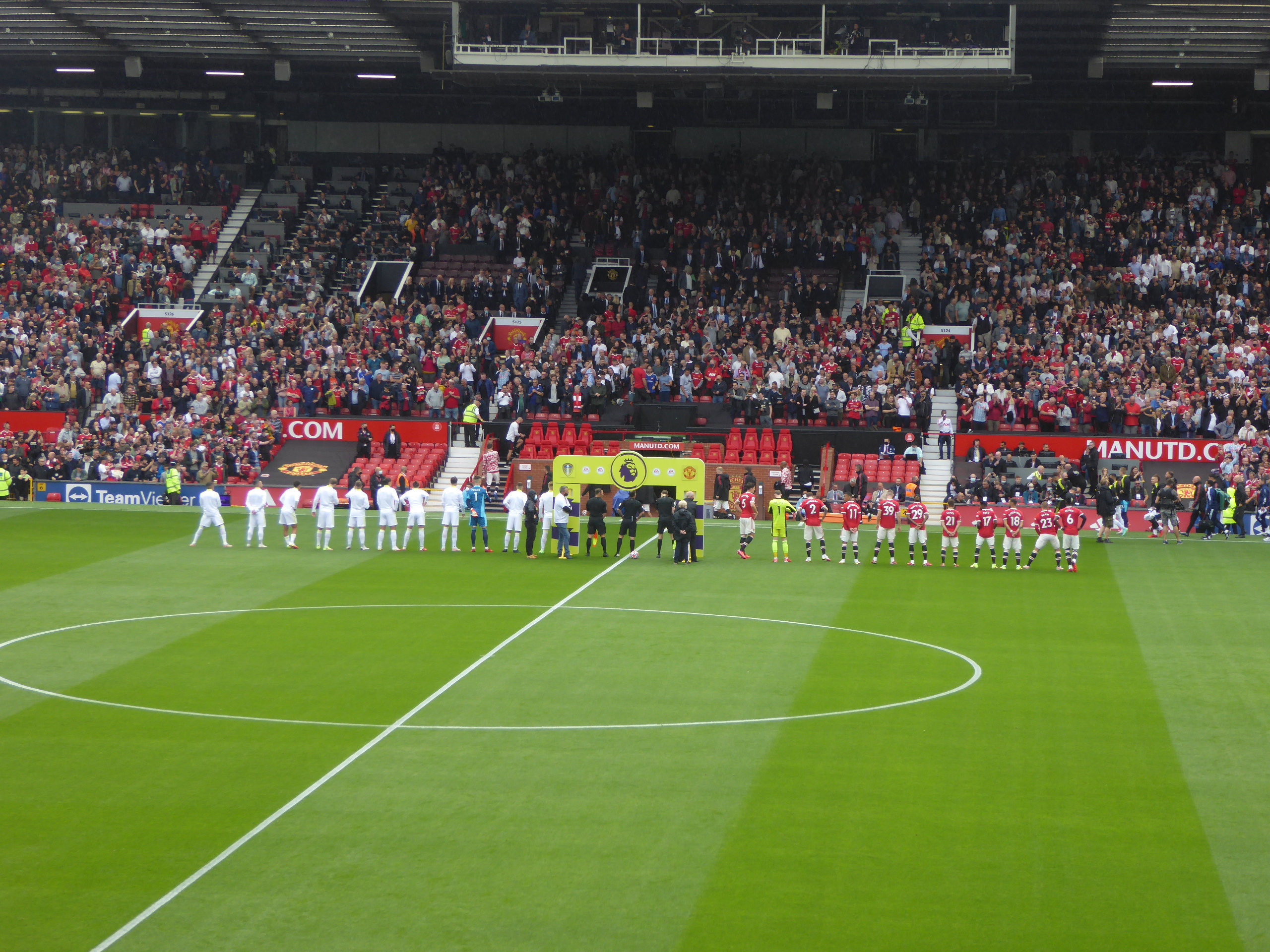
- Leeds United and Manchester United at Old Trafford on 14 August 2021.
- Location: Northern England
- Teams: Leeds United; Manchester United
- First meeting: 20 January 1923; Second Division; Manchester United 0–0 Leeds United
- Latest meeting: 18 October 2026; Premier League; Leeds United 1–1 Manchester United
- Next meeting: 15 May 2027; Premier League; Manchester United v Leeds United
- Stadiums: Elland Road (Leeds United); Old Trafford (Manchester United)

Statistics
- Total meetings: 116
- Most wins: Manchester United (50)
- Most player appearances: Bobby Charlton (29)
- Top scorer: Bobby Charlton (9)
- All-time series: Manchester United: 50; Draws: 39; Leeds United: 27
- Largest victory: Manchester United 6–0 Leeds United; Football League (9 September 1959)

The rivalry between Leeds United and Manchester United, sometimes nicknamed the Roses rivalry, is a footballing rivalry played between the Northern English clubs Leeds United and Manchester United. The rivalry originates from the strong rivalry between the historic counties of Lancashire and Yorkshire, which is popularly believed to have its origins in the Wars of the Roses of the 15th century. Although the cities of Leeds and Manchester lie over 40 miles (64 km) apart, the tradition is upheld and this strong feeling can still be seen between the two clubs. Independent research by the Football Fans Census has shown that, within English football, both Leeds and Manchester United are ranked within the top three clubs based on the number of clubs that consider them to be their rivals.

In the past, rivalry between the two clubs has gone beyond the action on the field at Old Trafford and Elland Road. Hostility became more intense over the years and during the 1970s, when British football hooliganism was at its height, fights between the Leeds United Service Crew and Manchester United's Red Army, the club's respective hooligan firms, were commonplace and became known as some of the most violent clashes in British football. Many people were injured in these encounters but violence between fans of the clubs has declined sharply since the 1970s for a number of reasons, mainly due to the general reduction in hooliganism. As recently as January 2010, prior to the two clubs meeting in the FA Cup 3rd round, Manchester United manager Sir Alex Ferguson described the matches as "fantastic, feisty occasions" with an "electric" atmosphere. The rivalry has also been labelled by The Daily Telegraph as "English football's most intense – and inexplicable – rivalry".

These encounters have been particularly scarce since 1982, the year that Leeds were relegated to the Second Division. Hooliganism was still rife among fans of English league clubs at this stage, and by the time Leeds returned to the top flight in 1990 the problem was less severe and has remained a lesser problem since. The rivalry and the hooliganism have been effectively curtailed since 2004, when Leeds were relegated from the Premier League. The teams met only twice between 2004 and 2020, and while polling showed Leeds fans still considered Manchester United to be their main rivals, Manchester United fans considered Liverpool to be their main rivals, followed by Manchester City, Chelsea, and Arsenal. The rivalry was renewed in the 2020–21 Premier League season, following Leeds United's promotion after winning the 2019–20 EFL Championship, with the sides' first encounter thereafter ending 6–2 to Manchester United. In terms of trophies won, the rivalry has been heavily in favour of Manchester United, who have won 68 trophies to Leeds United's nine.

== Roots ==
=== Wars of the Roses ===
Red Rose of Lancaster

White Rose of York

The rivalry is considered to be a sporting manifestation of the established rivalry between the counties of Yorkshire and Lancashire, which can loosely be traced back to the Wars of the Roses, a series of civil wars fought between the rival Plantagenet royal houses of York and Lancaster for the throne of England during the 15th century. The battles contested during the wars were particularly bloody, especially the Battle of Towton, which took place just 15 miles (24 km) away from Leeds and is described as "England's bloodiest ever battle".

The colours of each football team's home shirts fittingly correspond to the respective rose representing their historic county – Leeds with a white kit, resembling the Yorkshire rose and Manchester United with a red shirt, like the Lancashire rose. However, Manchester United's colours have not always been red and Leeds only adopted their white kit in the 1960s, inspired by Real Madrid. There is a similar rivalry in the sport of cricket, in which matches are contested on a county basis. In this case, the Roses Match is the name given to games played between Yorkshire County Cricket Club and Lancashire County Cricket Club. Although the clubs cover the larger county region, Yorkshire are based in Leeds and play at the Headingley Cricket Ground, while Lancashire play at the Old Trafford Cricket Ground in Manchester, close to the football stadium of the same name. Manchester is now in the metropolitan county of Greater Manchester, while Leeds is now in the metropolitan county of West Yorkshire.

=== Industrial Revolution ===
A direct rivalry between the cities of Leeds and Manchester sprang up during the Industrial Revolution in Britain during the 18th and 19th centuries. The entire country was going through an unprecedented phase of economic growth and Leeds' economy had grown rapidly thanks to the woollen industry. Meanwhile, to the west in Manchester, the cotton industry began to flourish, with factories fuelled by the transportation of cheap coal down the Bridgewater Canal.

During the mid-19th century, Leeds had constructed the impressive Grade I listed Leeds Town Hall, though the wealth which Manchester had acquired allowed them to retort by constructing striking architectural works of their own, such as the Grade I listed Manchester Town Hall. This served to establish the rivalry between the two cities even further.

== Football ==
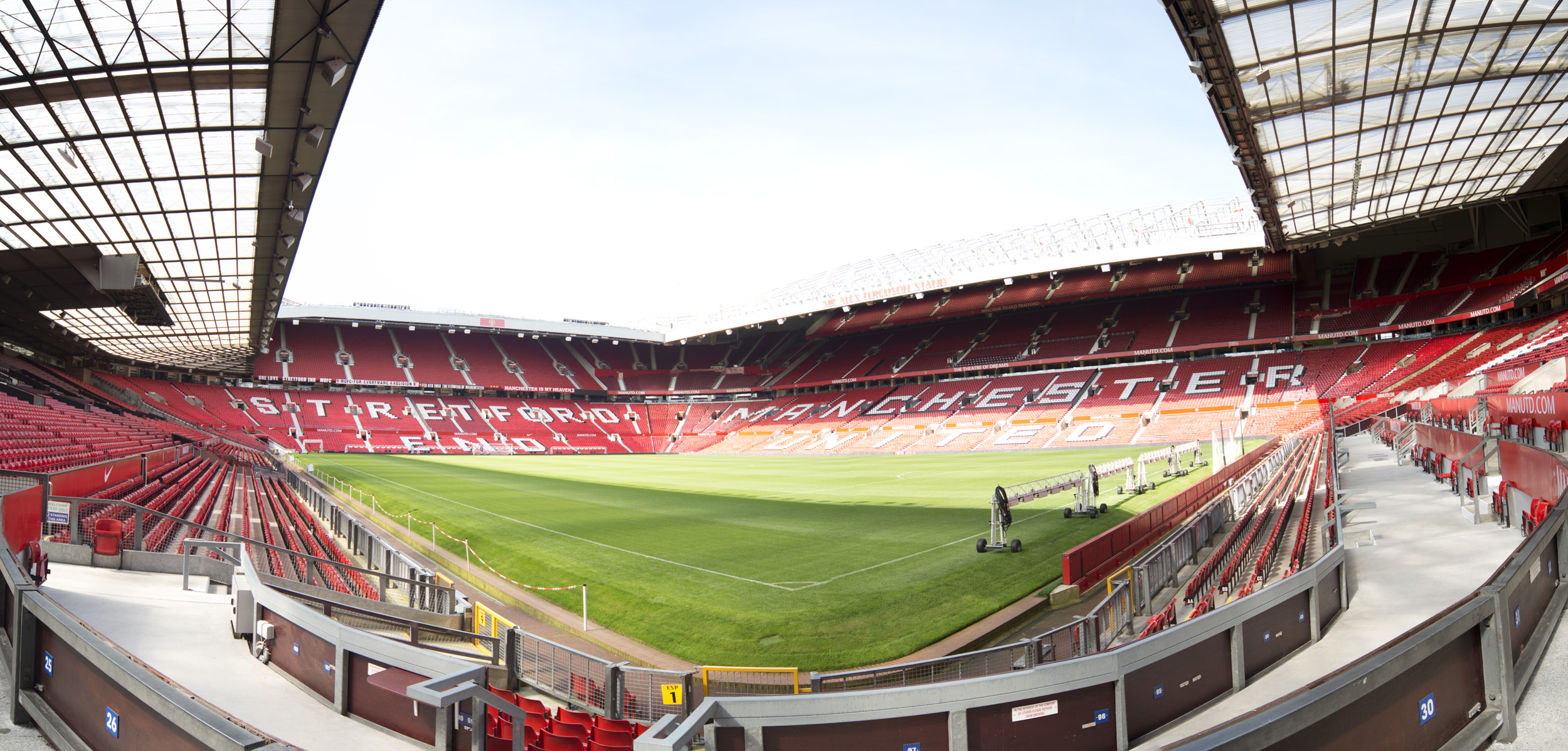
Old Trafford – home of Manchester United

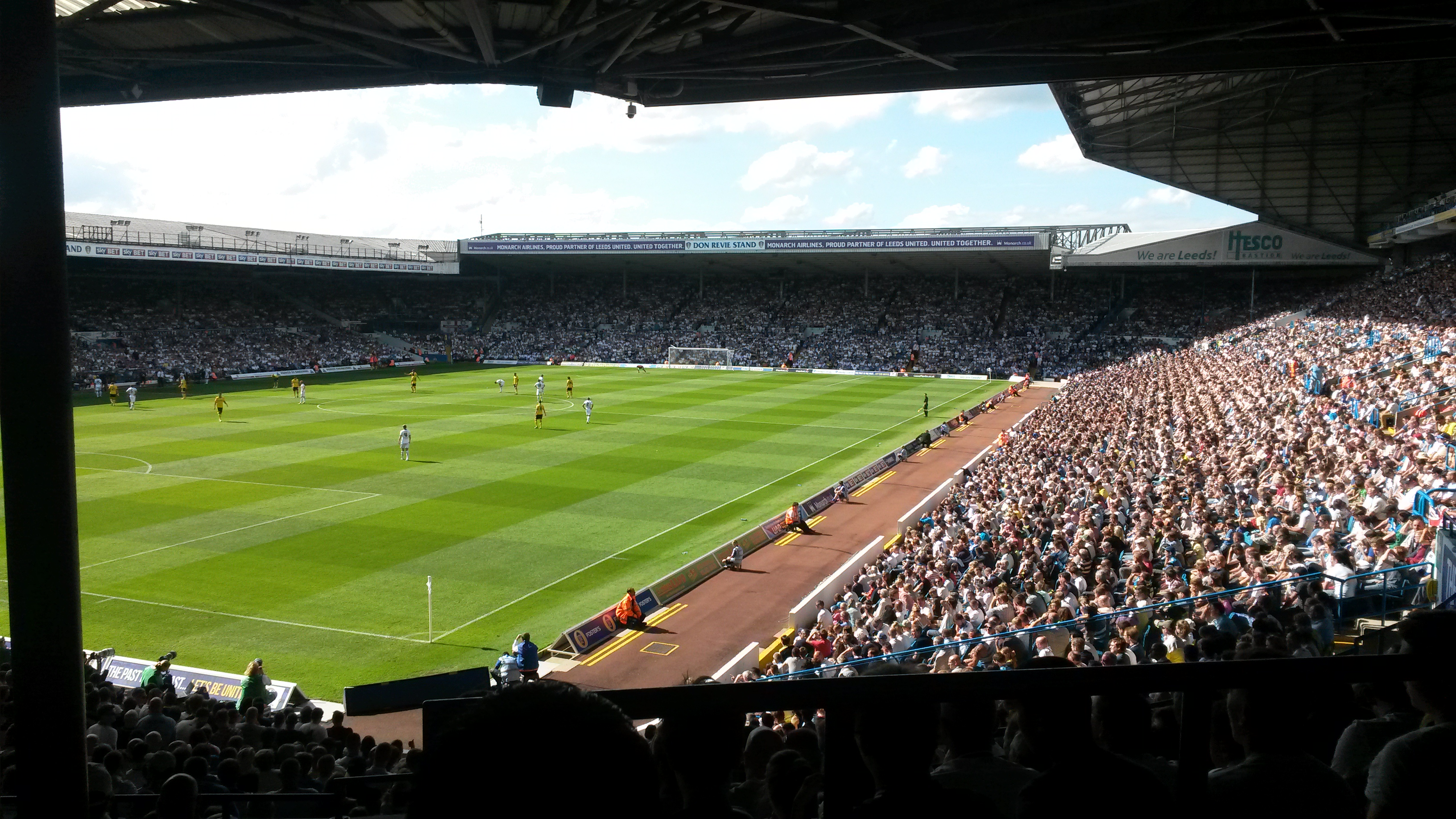
Elland Road – home of Leeds United

=== Earliest meetings ===
Manchester United were the first side to emerge, despite club football itself first originating in Yorkshire. The club was founded in 1878 as Newton Heath L&YR by employees of Lancashire and Yorkshire Railway, with the company – as the name suggests – covering both historic counties. The club's new owners later changed their name to Manchester United in 1902. Leeds had traditionally been a rugby league city so it was a while before the attraction of football finally appealed to the local people. An association football club was finally made though in 1904, when Leeds City emerged. The two sides clashed for the first time in the Second Division at Manchester United's Bank Street stadium on 15 January 1906 in front of 6,000 fans. Leeds City won the game 3–0, but United won the return game at Elland Road 3–1 on 21 April.

These matches proved to be both the first and the last times that the two clubs met, as Manchester United were promoted to the First Division at the end of the 1905–06 season and Leeds City were eventually forcibly disbanded due to financial irregularities. A new club was formed under the name "Leeds United", and they began playing in the Midland League, taking the place vacated by Leeds City's reserve team. The club also took over Elland Road, which had been occupied by Yorkshire Amateur since the demise of Leeds City. Leeds United were elected to the Second Division on 31 May 1920 and they met Manchester United for the first time at Old Trafford on 20 January 1923. However, the 25,000 spectators went home disappointed as the match ended 0–0. Manchester United claimed the first victory, and indeed the first away win, between the two sides, when they beat Leeds 1–0 at Elland Road a week later on 27 January. It took Leeds until the 1925–26 season to gain their first victory, winning 2–0 at Elland Road on 3 October.

In the 1928–29 season Leeds achieved their first away victory against Manchester United, with a 2–1 win at Old Trafford in the First Division. Leeds also won the fixture at Elland Road 3–2 and became the first of the two sides to achieve a double over the other (winning both fixtures between the two sides in one season). Manchester United's first double over Leeds, however, did not come until 1946–47, when a 3–1 win at Old Trafford was followed by a 2–0 win at Elland Road. Neither side was particularly successful during this period though, and the two sides only met sporadically due to several promotions and relegations.

=== Busby v Revie – the rivalry intensifies ===
Denis Law's shirt after the vicious FA Cup semi-final

It was not until after the Second World War that Manchester United became a fully-fledged footballing power, as they picked up three league titles during the 1950s. Matt Busby was the man who had coached Manchester United to glory and he remained at the club until 1969. Meanwhile, across to the east, Leeds United had signed up former player Don Revie as their player-manager and he soon took the manager's post full-time. Manchester United's side during this era featured the likes of Bobby Charlton, Denis Law and George Best, while under Revie Leeds had gained a reputation as a tough, uncompromising side, with the likes of Bobby's brother Jack Charlton, Billy Bremner, and Norman Hunter. Another key member of Revie's side was the Irishman Johnny Giles, who joined Leeds from Manchester United for £33,000 in 1963.

During the 1964–65 season, the two sides were drawn against each other in the semi-finals of the FA Cup for a chance to reach the final. The tie at Hillsborough was a very rough game – the image of Jack Charlton and Denis Law punching each other and wrestling on the ground epitomised the spirit in which the game was played – and it ended 0–0, with the Yorkshire Post commenting "both sides behaved like a pack of dogs snapping and snarling at each other over a bone". The replay at the City Ground was tense and it took 89 minutes for Bremner to fire in the winner for Leeds. The two clubs finished 1st and 2nd in the league that same season, both on 61 points, but the Mancunians won the title due to a better goal average.

The rivalry between the two sides carried on at full force throughout the rest of the 1960s and the 1970s. Leeds achieved both domestic and European success, winning the First Division title in the 1968–69 season and the 1973–74 season, as well as finishing runners-up five more times, and never finishing outside the top four places whilst Revie was at the helm. Leeds earned a feared reputation for toppling European sides, including the likes of Juventus, Barcelona, Napoli, Anderlecht and Valencia; in doing so they became Inter-Cities Fairs champions twice and once runners-up, and controversially came runners up in the 1973 European Cup Winners' Cup final and 1975 European Cup final. Leeds new dominance was highlighted by the fact that in 1970 they came close to achieving an historic Cup Treble, however they finished runners up in both the league and FA Cup, and were knocked out of the European Cup at the semi-final stage. During this period Manchester United only won the league once, in the 1966–67 season, and were at the end of several defeats inflicted by Leeds, including a 5–1 defeat at Elland Road in 1972, they were relegated in the season Leeds became champions in 1974. However they had other successes, including winning the European Cup in 1968, an honour Leeds have never won.

The 1977 FA Cup semi-final between the two sides at Hillsborough was labelled 'The Battle of the Roses' on the cover of the official match-day programme. There was extensive violent clashes between supporters outside the stadium both before and after the match plus during the match inside the stadium, with numerous arrests and injuries. Manchester United won the match 2–1 and went on to beat Liverpool with the same scoreline in the final.

In 1978, Joe Jordan and Gordon McQueen, two of Leeds' best players at the time, were both sold to Manchester United. This was tough for the Leeds fans to take, especially in the case of McQueen as he was a fan favourite. The following season, the two players appeared against their former club. McQueen was targeted in particular with booing and jeering at Elland Road and objects were hurled at him before he scored a headed goal for Manchester United to silence the home fans.

=== Renewal ===
The Roses rivalry did not take place for nearly a decade because Leeds were relegated in 1982, while Manchester United remained competitive in the First Division and in the hunt for honours almost every season.

Leeds eventually returned under the stewardship of Howard Wilkinson in 1990 with a newly strengthened squad that had finished as Second Division champions. The first two seasons after Leeds won promotion brought draws between the two sides in all four league meetings, though Manchester United triumphed over the Yorkshire side in League Cup and FA Cup ties during that time.

The last league championship before the introduction of the Premier League came in the 1991–92 season, two seasons after Leeds' promotion, and for much of the season it was a straight title race between Leeds United and Manchester United. Thanks to the likes of Gordon Strachan (who was bought from Manchester United), Lee Chapman, David Batty and Eric Cantona, Leeds won the league by four points. However, much to the surprise of Leeds fans, Cantona was sold to Manchester United for £1.2 million, later in 1992. He would be the cornerstone of Manchester United's 1990s revival, leading them to the Premier League title on four occasions in just five seasons and he thus became one of the club's legends. In 2001, he was voted their player of the century and, to this day, Manchester United fans refer to him as "King Eric".

On-pitch clashes continued to happen between the clubs, with notable incidents including the beginning of a personal grudge between Manchester United captain Roy Keane and Alf-Inge Haaland in September 1997, a clash between Ian Harte and Fabien Barthez in March 2001, and a tussle between Robbie Keane and David Beckham in October 2001.

Two Leeds United fans were stabbed to death during a UEFA Cup game against Galatasaray in 2000. Many Manchester United fans paid their respects, leaving tributes at Elland Road, and there were even reports of Leeds and Manchester United fans embracing, with The Independent using the headline "Old rivalries forgotten as fans unite in grief". However, by the time the two sides faced up in the league, a subsection of Manchester United fans unfurled banners bearing the words "MUFC Istanbul Reds" and "Galatasaray Reds", glorifying the killers and mocking Leeds supporters. The Manchester United fans who unfurled these banners may have been retaliating to consistent taunting by Leeds fans about the Munich air disaster over the years (these chants have also been made by the supporters of many other clubs, particularly Liverpool), but these banners angered the Leeds fans, who retorted by chanting songs about Munich, and there were reports of seats being ripped up and confrontations after the game.

=== Leeds in the lower leagues ===
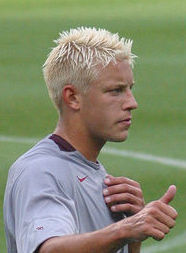
Leeds-born Alan Smith left his hometown club for Manchester United in 2004.

After going through a period of extreme financial difficulties, resulting from huge amounts of money being poured into the club to help them reach the UEFA Champions League semi-finals in 2001, Leeds were relegated from the Premier League at the end of the 2003–04 season. Alan Smith, a local boy and firm fan favourite at Leeds, shocked the Leeds fans after their relegation by transferring to Manchester United. The Leeds fans dubbed him "Judas" and his actions were made particularly hard for them to take as Smith had been noted for kissing the club badge on his Leeds shirt and he had said that he would stay with the club even if they went down. He had also previously stated years before on an interview with Soccer AM that he would never join Manchester United. He was welcomed by Manchester United fans and soon became a fan favourite, the fans respecting him and his decision to join a rival club.

The two sides have rarely met since Leeds' relegation from the Premier League. A 2003 poll by the Football Fans Census showed that while Leeds fans still consider Manchester United to be their main rivals, Manchester United fans consider Liverpool to be their main rivals, followed by Manchester City, Chelsea and Arsenal.

On 3 January 2010, the teams met for the first time in nearly six years in an FA Cup Third Round tie at Old Trafford. Despite being 43 places lower in the league than their rivals, Leeds United won the match 1–0, giving them their first win at Old Trafford for over 28 years.

The clubs were drawn to meet in the third round of the 2011–12 Football League Cup. The match was played at Elland Road on 20 September 2011, with Manchester United winning 3–0. The current gulf in resources of the two clubs was illustrated by Manchester United resting many regular first team players yet still comfortably beating a near full-strength Leeds side. After the match the West Yorkshire Police opened an investigation into 'disgusting' chants from both sets of fans, about the Munich air disaster and the murder of two Leeds fans in Turkey.

=== Back in the Premier League ===
The clubs met again in the 2020–21 Premier League, after Leeds got promoted by winning the 2019–20 EFL Championship. Their first Premier League meeting in nearly 17 years resulted in a 6–2 loss for Leeds at Old Trafford, followed by a 0–0 draw in the reverse fixture at Elland Road. The following season held a similar fate for Leeds as they were thrashed 5–1 on opening day at Old Trafford, this being the first game in front of a full capacity crowd at the stadium in 524 days. The latter game again featured controversial incidents involving both sets of supporters; Leeds fans were accused of singing about the Munich air disaster and aiming abuse at former Leeds and Manchester United defender Rio Ferdinand, while Manchester United supporters were filmed dropping a Turkish flag into a group of Leeds supporters in the away section. Manchester United then won the return fixture, the first time either club had achieved a double since the 1999–2000 league season. Their first clash of the 2022–23 Premier League should have been held on 18 September 2022, but was postponed due to security concerns related to the death and state funeral of Elizabeth II, so the fixture, which ended 2–2, was then played on 8 February 2023, four days before the return fixture. At Leeds, Manchester United won 2–0 in what would be the last meeting for the two sides for three seasons, due to Leeds' relegation.

On 4 January 2026, the two rivals met for the first time in nearly three years, ended in a 1–1 draw. It would be Ruben Amorim's last game as Manchester United head coach, as he was dismissed the following day. The return fixture saw Leeds defeat Manchester United in a league match at Old Trafford for the first time since 28 February 1981. This was also the first time that Leeds avoid defeat against Manchester United in a season across competitions since the 1980–81 season.

== Results summary ==
As of 18 October 2026

Competition	Leeds United wins	Draws	Manchester United wins	Leeds United goals	Manchester United goals
League	24	36	41	109	149
FA Cup	3	3	4	5	10
League Cup	0	0	5	4	12
Total	27	39	50	118	171

== Last five head-to-head fixtures ==
Date	Home team	Score	Away team	Venue	Competition
8 February 2023	Manchester United	2–2	Leeds United	Old Trafford	Premier League
12 February 2023	Leeds United	0–2	Manchester United	Elland Road	Premier League
4 January 2026	Leeds United	1–1	Manchester United	Elland Road	Premier League
13 April 2026	Manchester United	1–2	Leeds United	Old Trafford	Premier League
18 October 2026	Leeds United	1–1	Manchester United	Elland Road	Premier League

== Records ==
=== Scorelines ===
- Biggest win:
  - For Leeds United: Leeds United 5–0 Manchester United, First Division, Elland Road, 20 December 1930
  - For Manchester United: Manchester United 6–0 Leeds United, First Division, Old Trafford, 9 September 1959
- Biggest League win:
  - For Leeds United: Leeds United 5–0 Manchester United, Elland Road, 20 December 1930
  - For Manchester United: Manchester United 6–0 Leeds United, Old Trafford, 9 September 1959
- Biggest FA Cup win:
  - For Leeds United:
    - Leeds United 1–0 Manchester United, Semi-final Replay, City Ground, 31 March 1965
    - Leeds United 1–0 Manchester United, Semi-final 2nd Replay, Highbury, 26 March 1970
    - Manchester United 0–1 Leeds United, Third Round, Old Trafford, 3 January 2010
  - For Manchester United: Manchester United 4–0 Leeds United, FA Cup fourth round, Old Trafford, 27 January 1951
- Biggest League Cup win:
  - For Leeds United: n/a
  - For Manchester United: Leeds United 0–3 Manchester United, Third Round, Elland Road, 20 September 2011
- Highest scoring:
  - At Elland Road: Leeds United 3–4 Manchester United, Elland Road, 30 March 2002
  - At Old Trafford: Manchester United 6–2 Leeds United, Old Trafford, 20 December 2020

=== Most appearances ===
Club	Player	League	FA Cup	League Cup	Total
Leeds United	Jack Charlton	22	5	0	27
Leeds United	Paul Reaney	21	6	0	27
Manchester United	Bobby Charlton	24	5	0	29

=== Most goals ===
Club	Player	League	FA Cup	League Cup	Total
Leeds United	Mick Jones	7	0	0	7
Manchester United	Bobby Charlton	9	0	0	9

- Most goals in one game:
  - For Leeds United: 3
    - Mick Jones, Leeds United 5–1 Manchester United, First Division, 19 February 1972
  - For Manchester United: 3
    - Stan Pearson, Manchester United 4–0 Leeds United, FA Cup fourth round, 27 January 1951
    - Andy Ritchie, Manchester United 4–1 Leeds United, First Division, 24 March 1979
    - Dennis Viollet, Manchester United 4–0 Leeds United, First Division, 21 March 1959
    - Bruno Fernandes, Manchester United 5–1 Leeds United, Premier League, 14 August 2021

=== Attendances ===
- Highest attendance:
  - Leeds United at home: 52,368 – Leeds United 0–1 Manchester United, 17 April 1965
  - Manchester United at home: 74,526 – Manchester United 0–1 Leeds United, 3 January 2010
- Lowest attendance:
  - Leeds United at home: 10,596 – Leeds United 3–1 Manchester United, 26 April 1930
  - Manchester United at home: 9,512 – Manchester United 2–5 Leeds United, 7 November 1931

== Honours ==
Table correct as of 25 May 2024

Team	League	FA Cup	League Cup	Community Shield	European Cup	UEFA Cup	Cup Winners' Cup	European Super Cup	Inter Cities Fairs Cup	Intercontinental Cup	Club World Cup	Total
Leeds United	3	1	1	2	0	0	0	0	2	0	0	9
Manchester United	20	13	6	21	3	1	1	1	0	1	1	68
Combined	23	14	7	23	3	1	1	1	2	1	1	77

(Charity/Community Shields includes shared honours after a drawn match, as per competition regulations prior to 1993)

== Player transfers ==
=== From Leeds United to Manchester United ===
Name	Date of transfer	Fee paid	Notes
Joe Jordan	4 January 1978	£350,000	
Gordon McQueen	1 February 1978	£500,000	
Arthur Graham	1 August 1983	£65,000	
Eric Cantona	12 November 1992	£1,200,000	
Rio Ferdinand	22 July 2002	£29,100,000	
Alan Smith	26 May 2004	£7,000,000 (p/e)	
Karl Darlow	14 July 2026	Free	

=== From Manchester United to Leeds United ===
Name	Date of transfer	Fee paid	Notes
Freddie Goodwin	16 March 1960	£10,000	
Johnny Giles	1 August 1963	£33,000	
Brian Greenhoff	1 August 1979	£350,000	
Gordon Strachan	21 March 1989	£300,000	
Lee Sharpe	14 August 1996	£4,500,000	
Danny Pugh	27 May 2004	p/e	
Liam Miller	4 November 2005	Loan	
Scott Wootton	21 September 2013	Undisclosed	
Cameron Borthwick-Jackson	7 August 2017	Loan	
Daniel James	31 August 2021	£25,000,000	

== See also ==
- Roses rivalry
- Major football rivalries
- Arsenal F.C.–Manchester United F.C. rivalry
- Chelsea F.C.–Leeds United F.C. rivalry
- Leeds United F.C.–Millwall F.C. rivalry
- Liverpool F.C.–Manchester United F.C. rivalry
- Manchester derby

== Notes ==
1.17 outright, 4 shared.
