= 1972–73 Football League First Division =

1972–73 season of Football League First Division

Football League First Division
- Season: 1972–73
- Champions: Liverpool; 8th English title
- Relegated: Crystal Palace; West Bromwich Albion
- European Cup: Liverpool
- UEFA Cup: Leeds United; Ipswich Town; Wolverhampton Wanderers; Tottenham Hotspur
- Watney Cup: West Ham United; Stoke City
- Matches: 462
- Goals: 1,160 (2.51 per match)
- Top goalscorer: Pop Robson (28 goals)
- Biggest home win: Liverpool 5–0 Sheffield United (23 September 1972); Leeds United 5–0 Derby County (7 October 1972); Crystal Palace 5–0 Manchester United (16 October 1972); Derby County 5–0 Arsenal (25 November 1972); Leeds United 6–1 Arsenal (9 March 1973)
- Biggest away win: West Bromwich Albion 0–4 Crystal Palace (3 March 1973)
- Highest scoring: Wolverhampton Wanderers 5–3 Stoke City (30 September 1972)

Statistics of Football League First Division in the 1972–73 season.

== Overview ==
Liverpool won the First Division title for the eighth time in the club's history that season. They made sure of the title with a 0–0 draw against Leicester City at Anfield and finished the season three points ahead of title challengers Arsenal. Crystal Palace were relegated on 24 April, after losing 2–1 at relegation rivals Norwich City. West Bromwich Albion joined them the next day after losing 2–1 at home to Manchester City.

== League standings ==
Pos	Team	Pld	W	D	L	GF	GA	GAv	Pts	Qualification or relegation
1	Liverpool (C)	42	25	10	7	72	42	1.714	60	Qualification for the European Cup first round
2	Arsenal	42	23	11	8	57	43	1.326	57	
3	Leeds United	42	21	11	10	71	45	1.578	53	Qualification for the UEFA Cup first round
4	Ipswich Town	42	17	14	11	55	45	1.222	48	Qualification for the UEFA Cup first round
5	Wolverhampton Wanderers	42	18	11	13	66	54	1.222	47	Qualification for the UEFA Cup first round
6	West Ham United	42	17	12	13	67	53	1.264	46	Qualification for the Watney Cup (Note: West Ham United and Stoke City qualified for the Watney Cup as the two teams with the most goals that hadn't already qualified for a European competition.)
7	Derby County	42	19	8	15	56	54	1.037	46	
8	Tottenham Hotspur	42	16	13	13	58	48	1.208	45	Qualification for the UEFA Cup first round
9	Newcastle United	42	16	13	13	60	51	1.176	45	
10	Birmingham City	42	15	12	15	53	54	0.981	42	
11	Manchester City	42	15	11	16	57	60	0.950	41	
12	Chelsea	42	13	14	15	49	51	0.961	40	
13	Southampton	42	11	18	13	47	52	0.904	40	
14	Sheffield United	42	15	10	17	51	59	0.864	40	
15	Stoke City	42	14	10	18	61	56	1.089	38	Qualification for the Watney Cup
16	Leicester City	42	10	17	15	40	46	0.870	37	
17	Everton	42	13	11	18	41	49	0.837	37	
18	Manchester United	42	12	13	17	44	60	0.733	37	
19	Coventry City	42	13	9	20	40	55	0.727	35	
20	Norwich City	42	11	10	21	36	63	0.571	32	
21	Crystal Palace (R)	42	9	12	21	41	58	0.707	30	Relegation to the Second Division
22	West Bromwich Albion (R)	42	9	10	23	38	62	0.613	28	Relegation to the Second Division

Source: World Football
Rules for classification: 1) Points; 2) Goal average; 3) Goals scored
(C) Champions; (R) Relegated

== Results ==
Home \ Away	ARS	BIR	CHE	COV	CRY	DER	EVE	IPS	LEE	LEI	LIV	MCI	MUN	NEW	NWC	SHU	SOU	STK	TOT	WBA	WHU	WOL
Arsenal		2–0	1–1	0–2	1–0	0–1	1–0	1–0	2–1	1–0	0–0	0–0	3–1	2–2	2–0	3–2	1–0	2–0	1–1	2–1	1–0	5–2
Birmingham City	1–1		2–2	3–0	1–1	2–0	2–1	1–2	2–1	1–1	2–1	4–1	3–1	3–2	4–1	1–2	1–1	3–1	0–0	3–2	0–0	0–1
Chelsea	0–1	0–0		2–0	0–0	1–1	1–1	2–0	4–0	1–1	1–2	2–1	1–0	1–1	3–1	4–2	2–1	1–3	0–1	3–1	1–3	0–2
Coventry City	1–1	0–0	1–3		2–0	0–2	1–0	2–1	0–1	3–2	1–2	3–2	1–1	0–3	3–1	3–0	1–1	2–1	0–1	0–0	3–1	0–1
Crystal Palace	2–3	0–0	2–0	0–1		0–0	1–0	1–1	2–2	0–1	1–1	1–0	5–0	2–1	0–2	0–1	3–0	3–2	0–0	0–2	1–3	1–1
Derby County	5–0	1–0	1–2	2–0	2–2		3–1	3–0	2–3	2–1	2–1	1–0	3–1	1–1	1–0	2–1	4–0	0–3	2–1	2–0	1–1	3–0
Everton	0–0	1–1	1–0	2–0	1–1	1–0		2–2	1–2	0–1	0–2	2–3	2–0	3–1	2–2	2–1	0–1	2–0	3–1	1–0	1–2	0–1
Ipswich Town	1–2	2–0	3–0	2–0	2–1	3–1	0–1		2–2	0–2	1–1	1–1	4–1	1–0	1–2	1–1	2–2	2–0	1–1	2–0	1–1	2–1
Leeds United	6–1	4–0	1–1	1–1	4–0	5–0	2–1	3–3		3–1	1–2	3–0	0–1	1–0	2–0	2–1	1–0	1–0	2–1	2–0	1–0	0–0
Leicester City	0–1	0–1	1–1	0–0	2–1	0–0	1–2	1–1	2–0		3–2	1–1	2–2	0–0	1–2	0–0	1–0	2–0	0–1	3–1	2–1	1–1
Liverpool	0–2	4–3	3–1	2–0	1–0	1–1	1–0	2–1	2–0	0–0		2–0	2–0	3–2	3–1	5–0	3–2	2–1	1–1	1–0	3–2	4–2
Manchester City	1–2	1–0	0–1	1–2	2–3	4–0	0–1	1–1	1–0	1–0	1–1		3–0	2–0	3–0	3–1	2–1	1–1	2–1	2–1	4–3	1–1
Manchester United	0–0	1–0	0–0	0–1	2–0	3–0	0–0	1–2	1–1	1–1	2–0	0–0		2–1	1–0	1–2	2–1	0–2	1–4	2–1	2–2	2–1
Newcastle United	2–1	3–0	1–1	1–1	2–0	2–0	0–0	1–2	3–2	2–2	2–1	2–1	2–1		3–1	4–1	0–0	1–0	0–1	1–1	1–2	2–1
Norwich City	3–2	1–2	1–0	1–1	2–1	1–0	1–1	0–0	1–2	1–1	1–1	1–1	0–2	0–1		1–1	0–0	2–0	2–1	2–0	0–1	1–1
Sheffield United	1–0	0–1	2–1	3–1	2–0	3–1	0–1	0–0	0–2	2–0	0–3	1–1	1–0	1–2	2–0		3–1	0–0	3–2	3–0	0–0	1–2
Southampton	2–2	2–0	3–1	2–1	2–0	1–1	0–0	1–2	3–1	0–0	1–1	1–1	0–2	1–1	1–0	1–1		1–0	1–1	2–1	0–0	1–1
Stoke City	0–0	1–2	1–1	2–1	2–0	4–0	1–1	1–0	2–2	1–0	0–1	5–1	2–2	2–0	2–0	2–2	3–3		1–1	2–0	2–0	2–0
Tottenham Hotspur	1–2	2–0	0–1	2–1	2–1	1–0	3–0	0–1	0–0	1–1	1–2	2–3	1–1	3–2	3–0	2–0	1–2	4–3		1–1	1–0	2–2
West Bromwich Albion	1–0	2–2	1–1	1–0	0–4	2–1	4–1	2–0	1–1	1–0	1–1	1–2	2–2	2–3	0–1	0–2	1–1	2–1	0–1		0–0	1–0
West Ham United	1–2	2–0	3–1	1–0	4–0	1–2	2–0	0–1	1–1	5–2	0–1	2–1	2–2	1–1	4–0	3–1	4–3	3–2	2–2	2–1		2–2
Wolverhampton Wanderers	1–3	3–2	1–0	3–0	1–1	1–2	4–2	0–1	0–2	2–0	2–1	5–1	2–0	1–1	3–0	1–1	0–1	5–3	3–2	2–0	3–0	

Updated to match(es) played on unknown. Source: Ian Laschke: Rothmans Book of Football League Records 1888–89 to 1978–79. Macdonald and Jane’s, London & Sydney, 1980.
Legend: Blue = home team win; Yellow = draw; Red = away team win.

== Managerial changes ==
Team	Outgoing manager	Manner of departure	Date of vacancy	Position in table	Incoming manager	Date of appointment
Coventry City	(England) Bob Dennison	End of caretaker spell	15 June 1972	Pre-season	(England) Joe Mercer	15 June 1972
Manchester United	(Republic of Ireland) Frank O'Farrell	Sacked	19 December 1972	21st	(Scotland) Tommy Docherty	22 December 1972
Crystal Palace	(England) Bert Head	Mutual consent	28 March 1973	20th	(England) Malcolm Allison	30 March 1973
Manchester City	(England) Malcolm Allison	Signed by Crystal Palace	30 March 1973	14th	(England) Johnny Hart	30 March 1973
Everton	(England) Harry Catterick	Resigned	7 April 1973	15th	(England) Tom Eggleston (caretaker)	7 April 1973

== Team locations ==
Locations of the Football League First Division 1972–73 teams
Locations of the Football League First Division London teams 1972–73

== Top scorers ==
Rank	Player	Club	Goals
1	(England) Pop Robson	West Ham United	28
2	(England) John Richards	Wolverhampton Wanderers	27
3	(England) Billy Dearden	Sheffield United	20
4	(England) Bob Latchford	Birmingham City	19
5	(England) Allan Clarke	Leeds United	18
=	(England) John Tudor	Newcastle United	18
