= List of association football rivalries in the United Kingdom =

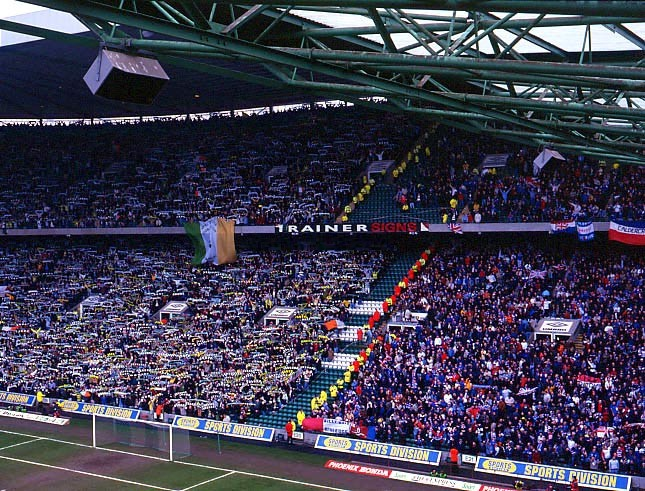
The Old Firm derby between Celtic and Rangers is one of the greatest in British sports. This image showing the separation of the two fanbases on derby day.

This article lists the association football rivalries in the UK.

Football derby matches in the United Kingdom are often heated affairs, and violence is not uncommon. However, the matches and the rivalries they encompass are frequently listed among the best in the sport. A 2008 report showed that West Bromwich Albion vs Wolverhampton Wanderers was the number one rivalry in English football, while Old Firm derby matches between Scottish clubs Rangers and Celtic are known to go beyond the sport with its "enormous quantity of references to wider cultural and political issues". The first football derby played was between Hallam F.C. and Sheffield F.C. in December 1860.

== England and Wales ==
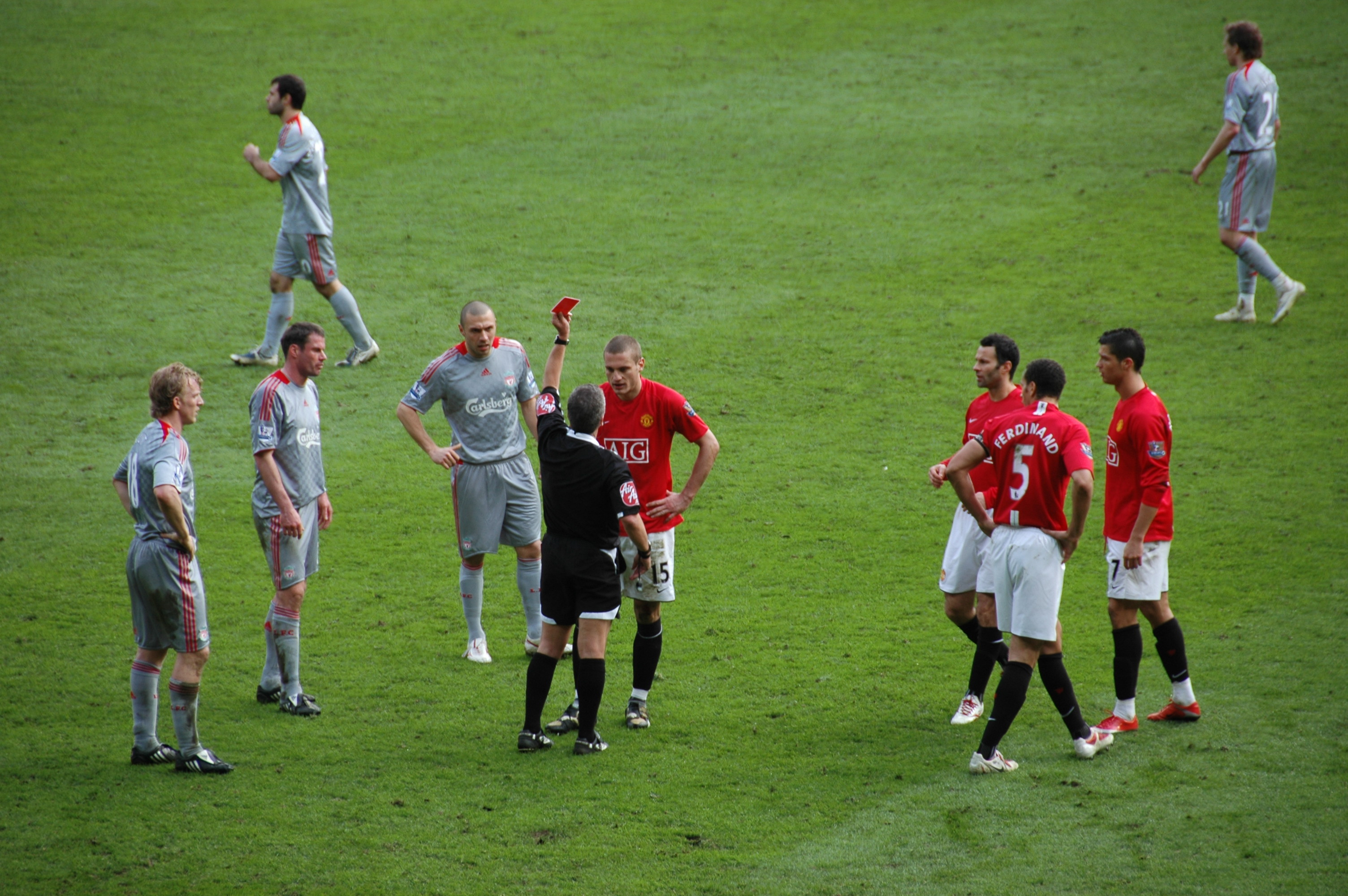
The two cities of Manchester and Liverpool share rivalries between them which gave birth to the North West Derby between Manchester United and Liverpool.

=== Central England ===
- Aylesbury derby: Aylesbury United vs. Aylesbury Vale Dynamos
- Bedford derby: Bedford Town vs. Real Bedford
- Berkshire derby: Any games featuring Reading, Maidenhead United or Slough Town
- Buckinghamshire derby: Milton Keynes Dons vs. Wycombe Wanderers
- Cambridge derby: Cambridge City vs. Cambridge United
- Cambridgeshire derby: Cambridge United vs. Peterborough United
- Colney derby: Colney Heath vs. London Colney
- Didcot Triangle derbies:
  - A420 derby: Oxford United vs. Swindon Town
  - M4 derby: Reading vs. Swindon Town
  - Thames Valley derby: Oxford United vs. Reading
- Dunstable derby: AFC Dunstable vs. Dunstable Town
- Hertfordshire derby: Any games featuring Boreham Wood, Hemel Hempstead Town or St Albans City
- Luton–Stevenage rivalry: Luton Town vs. Stevenage
- M1 derby: Luton Town vs. Watford
- M40 Derby: Oxford United vs. Wycombe Wanderers
- Maidenhead derby: Maidenhead Town vs. Maidenhead United
- Milton Keynes–Northampton rivalry: Milton Keynes Dons vs. Northampton Town
- Milton Keynes–Peterborough rivalry: Milton Keynes Dons vs. Peterborough United
- Nene derby: Northampton Town vs. Peterborough United
- Northamptonshire derby: Kettering Town vs. Rushden & Diamonds – can also refer to any of the two against Corby Town or Northampton Town
- Northampton–Oxford rivalry: Northampton Town vs. Oxford United
- Oxford derby: Oxford City vs. Oxford United
- Oxfordshire derby: Didcot Town vs. Oxford City
- Small Cambridgeshire derby: Cambridge City or Cambridge United vs. Histon
- Thames River derby: Slough Town vs. Windsor & Eton
- Windsor derby: Windsor vs. Windsor & Eton

=== Eastern England ===
- Basildon Borough derby: Any games featuring Basildon United, Billericay Town and Bowers & Pitsea
- Billericay-Chelmsford rivalry: Billericay Town vs. Chelmsford City
- Braintree-Chelmsford rivalry: Braintree Town vs. Chelmsford City
- Canvey Island derby: Canvey Island vs. Concord Rangers
- Colchester–Ipswich rivalry: Colchester United vs. Ipswich Town
- East Anglian derby (also known as the Old Farm derby): Ipswich Town vs. Norwich City
- Essex derby: Colchester United vs. Southend United
- M11 derby: Bishop's Stortford vs. Harlow Town
- Maldon derby: Heybridge Swifts vs. Maldon & Tiptree
- Norfolk derby: Gorleston vs. Great Yarmouth Town
- Suffolk derby:
  - Bury Town vs. Sudbury
  - Leiston vs. Lowestoft Town
  - Lowestoft Town vs. Needham Market

=== Greater London ===
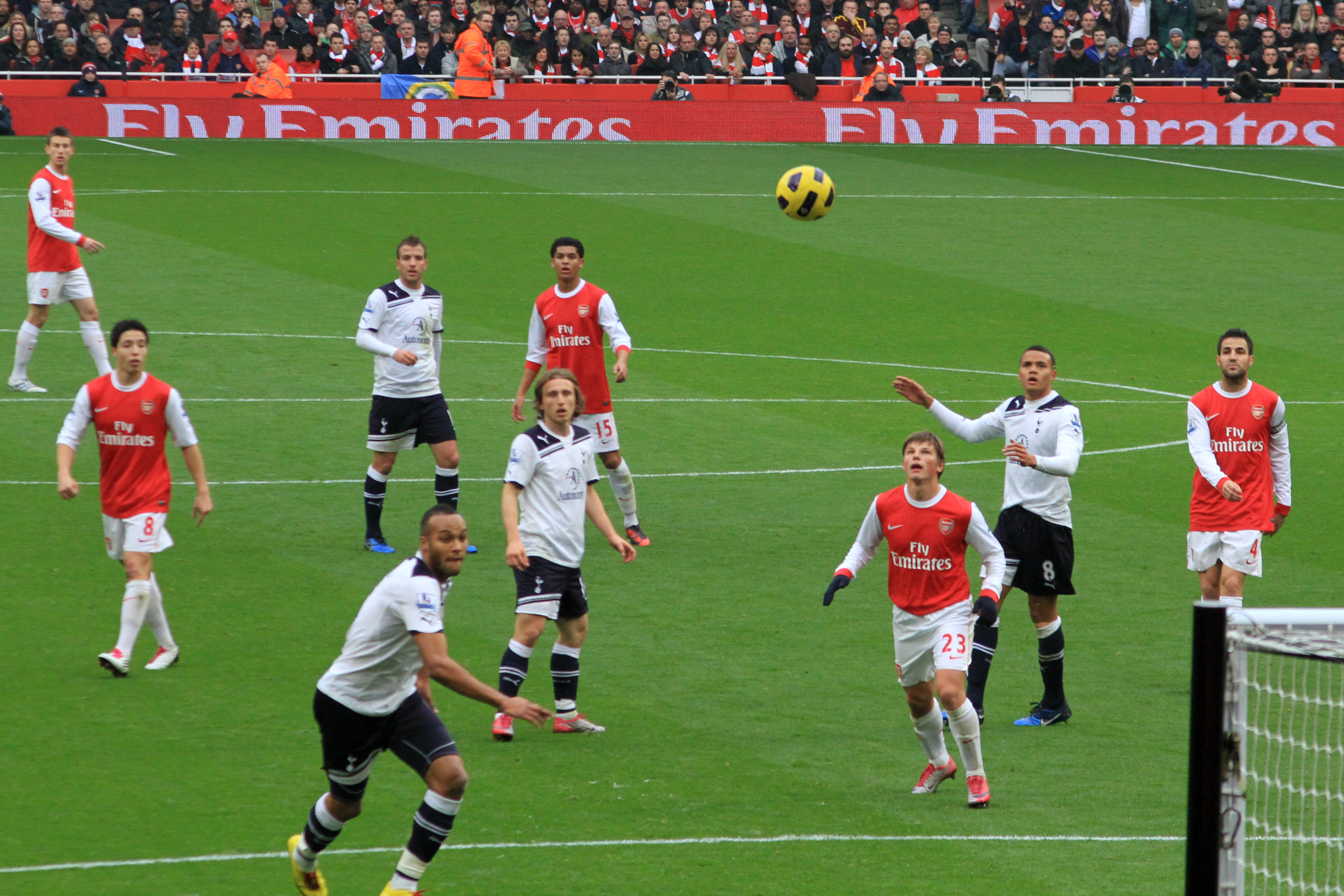
A North London derby match in 2010

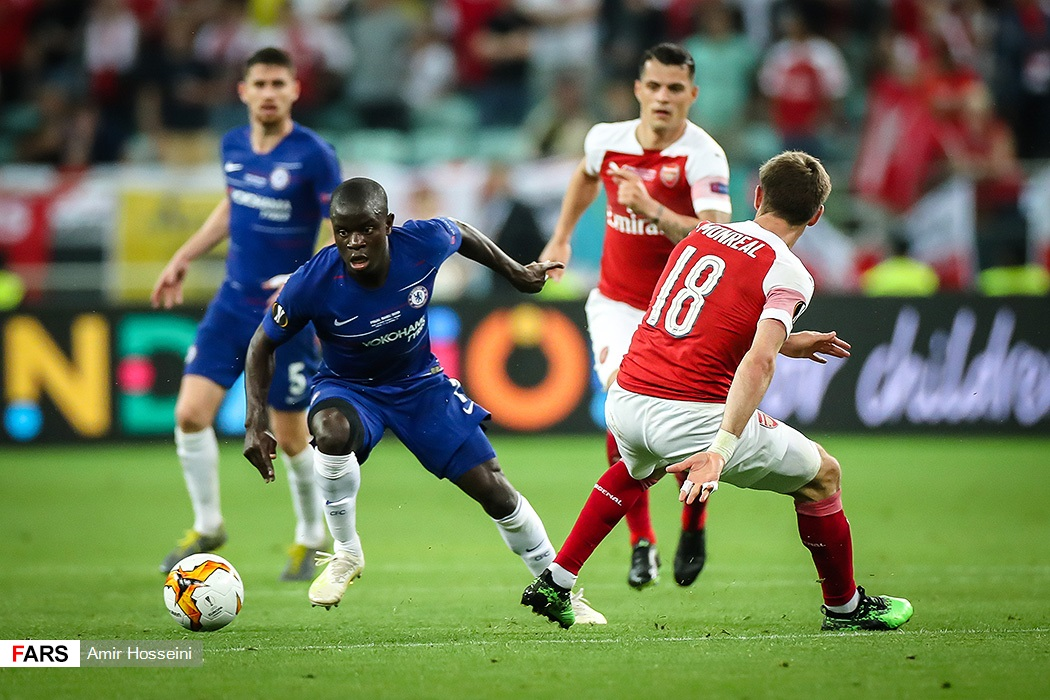
Chelsea beat London rivals Arsenal in the 2019 UEFA Europa League final.

These matches involve at least one football club in the second pyramid level and lower, and/or that have experienced at least one relegation and one promotion, especially from the first pyramid level.

- Arsenal–Chelsea rivalry: Arsenal vs. Chelsea
- Barnet–Wealdstone rivalry: Barnet vs. Wealdstone
- Chelsea-Crystal Palace rivalry: Chelsea vs. Crystal Palace
- Chelsea-Millwall rivalry: Chelsea vs. Millwall
- Chelsea–West Ham United rivalry: Chelsea vs. West Ham United
- Croydon derby: Croydon vs. Croydon Athletic
- Dockers derby: Millwall vs. West Ham United
- Dulwich–Tooting derby: Dulwich Hamlet vs. Tooting & Mitcham
- East London derby: Leyton Orient vs. West Ham United, also may include a match between either of those and Dagenham & Redbridge
- Enfield derby: Enfield 1893 vs. Enfield Town
- Harrow derby: Harrow Borough vs. Wealdstone
- North London derby: Arsenal vs. Tottenham Hotspur
- South London derby: any match between Charlton Athletic, Crystal Palace, Millwall and AFC Wimbledon.
- Sutton derby: Carshalton Athletic vs. Sutton United
- Tottenham Hotspur–West Ham United rivalry: Tottenham Hotspur vs. West Ham United
- West London derby: any match between Brentford, Chelsea, Fulham and Queens Park Rangers

=== Midlands ===
- A5 derby: Nuneaton Town vs. Tamworth
- Bassetlaw derby: Any games featuring Retford, Retford United or Worksop Town
- Buxton–Leek rivalry: Buxton vs. Leek Town
- East Midlands derby:
  - Derby–Leicester rivalry: Derby County vs. Leicester City
  - Derby–Nottingham Forest rivalry: Derby County vs. Nottingham Forest
  - Leicester–Nottingham Forest rivalry: Leicester City vs. Nottingham Forest
  - Lincoln–Mansfield rivalry: Lincoln City vs. Mansfield Town
- Derbyshire derby: Chesterfield vs. Derby County
- Hereford–Kidderminster rivalry: Hereford vs. Kidderminster Harriers
- Hinckley derby: Hinckley vs. Hinckley Leicester Road
- Nottingham derby: Nottingham Forest vs. Notts County
- Lincolnshire derby: Any game featuring Boston United, Gainsborough Trinity, Grimsby Town, Lincoln City and Scunthorpe United, although games solely between Grimsby and Scunthorpe are usually referred to as the Humber derby.
- Nottinghamshire derby: Mansfield Town vs. Notts County
- Number Nine derby: Halesowen Town vs. Stourbridge
- M69 derby: Coventry City vs. Leicester City
- Miners' strike derby: Chesterfield vs. Mansfield Town
- Potteries derby: Port Vale vs. Stoke City
- Retford derby: Retford vs. Retford United
- Second City derby: Aston Villa vs. Birmingham City
- Shrewsbury–Walsall rivalry: Shrewsbury Town vs. Walsall
- Shrewsbury–Wolves rivalry: Shrewsbury Town vs. Wolverhampton Wanderers
- Shropshire derby: Shrewsbury Town vs. A.F.C. Telford United
- South Holland derby: Spalding United vs. Stamford
- Staffordshire derby:
  - Burton Albion vs. Port Vale
  - Burton Albion vs. Tamworth
  - Chasetown vs. Hednesford Town
  - Hednesford Town vs. Stafford Rangers
  - Port Vale vs. Walsall
  - Stoke City vs. West Bromwich Albion
  - Stoke City vs. Wolverhampton Wanderers
- West Midlands derby:
  - Aston Villa–Coventry rivalry: Aston Villa vs. Coventry City
  - Aston Villa–West Bromwich rivalry: Aston Villa vs. West Bromwich Albion
  - Aston Villa–Wolves rivalry: Aston Villa vs. Wolverhampton Wanderers
  - Black Country derby: West Bromwich Albion vs. Wolverhampton Wanderers
  - Birmingham–West Bromwich rivalry: Birmingham City vs. West Bromwich Albion
  - Birmingham–Wolves rivalry: Birmingham City vs. Wolverhampton Wanderers
  - Walsall–Wolves rivalry: Walsall vs. Wolverhampton Wanderers

=== North-Eastern England ===
- Auckland derby: Bishop Auckland vs. West Auckland Town
- Billingham derby: Billingham Synthonia vs. Billingham Town
- Blyth–Gateshead rivalry: Blyth Spartans vs. Gateshead
- Coast Road derby: Heaton Stannington vs. Newcastle Benfield
- Darlington–Spennymoor rivalry: Darlington vs. Spennymoor Town
- Darlington–York rivalry: Darlington vs. York City
- East Durham derby: refers to matches between Easington Colliery, Horden Community Welfare and Seaham Red Star
- Humber derby: refers to any match between Grimsby Town, Hull City, and Scunthorpe United
- River Wear Derby: Durham Women vs. Sunderland Women
- Teesside derby: Darlington vs. Hartlepool United or Guisborough Town vs. Redcar Athletic
- Tees–Wear derby: Middlesbrough vs. Sunderland
- The Shields derby: North Shields vs. South Shields
- Tyne–Tees derby: Middlesbrough vs. Newcastle United
- Tyne–Wear derby: Newcastle United vs. Sunderland
- Newcastle upon Tyne derby: Newcastle United vs. Newcastle Benfield vs. Newcastle Blue Star vs. Newcastle University vs. Heaton Stannington vs. Team Northumbria vs. West Allotment Celtic
- Sunderland derby: Sunderland vs. Sunderland RCA vs. Sunderland West End vs. Washington

=== North-West England and Yorkshire ===
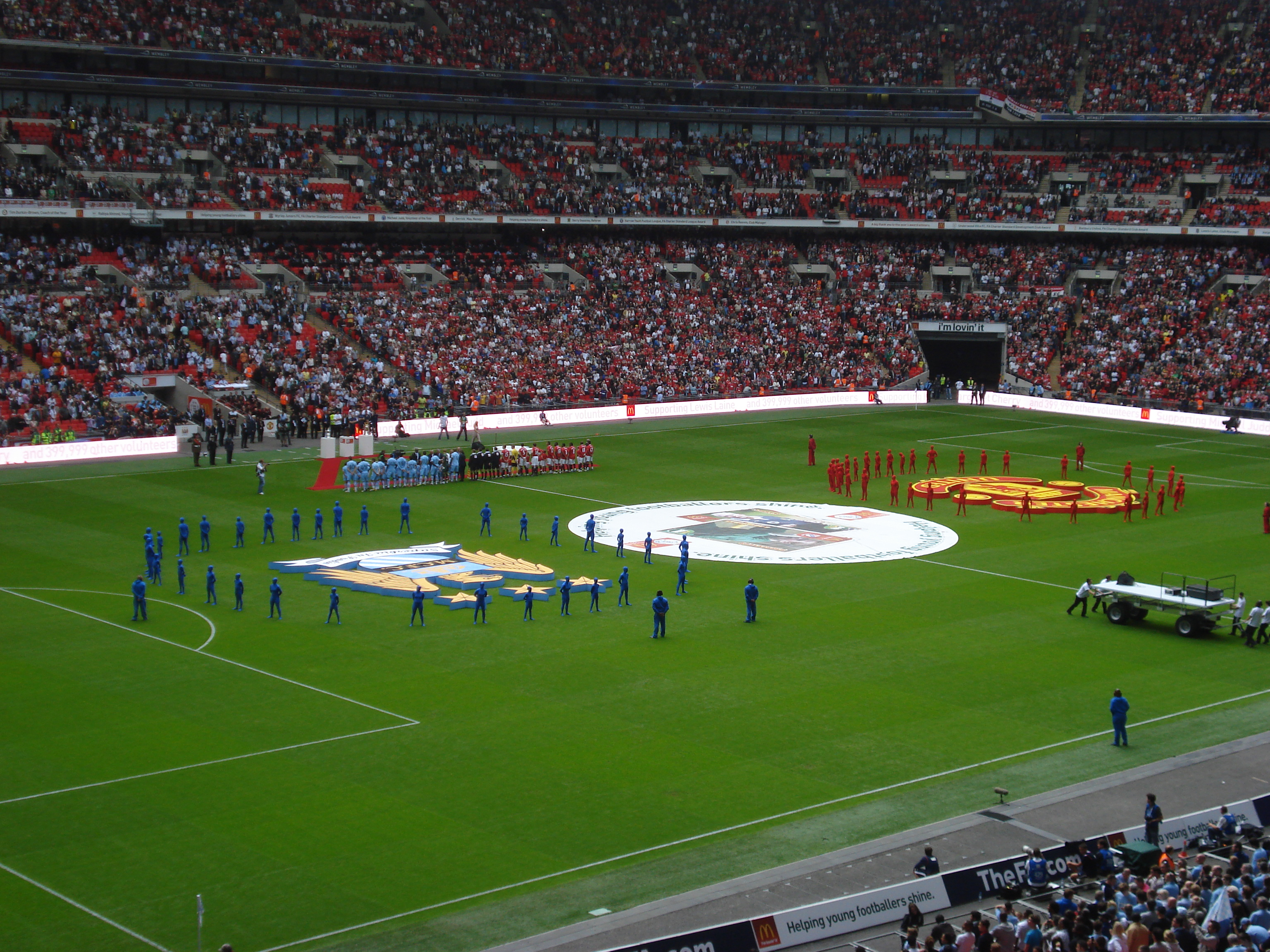
A Manchester derby in the 2011 FA Community Shield

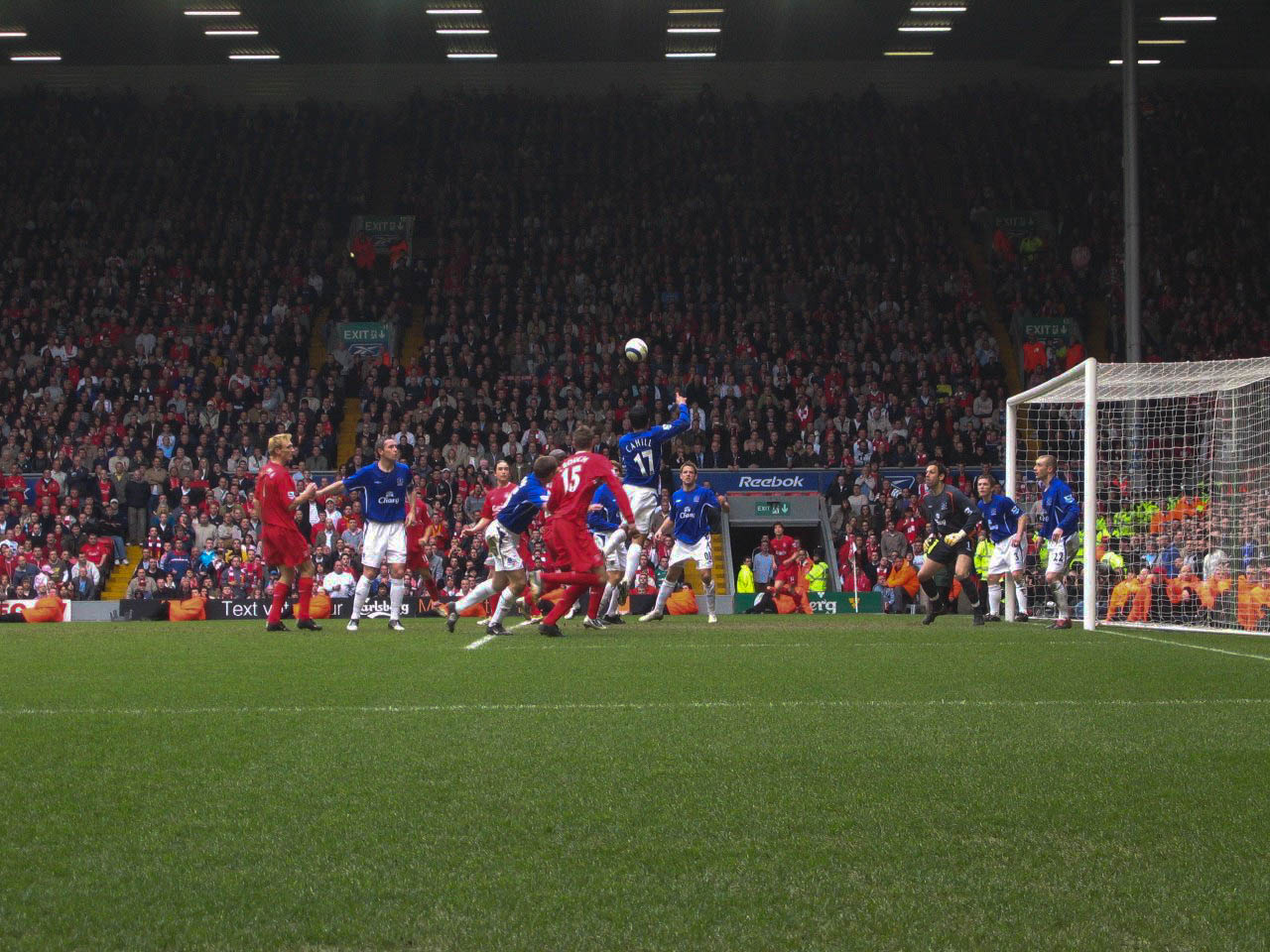
The Merseyside derby in Liverpool is another major North English football rivalry.

These matches involve at least one football club in the second pyramid level and lower, and/or that have experienced at least one relegation and one promotion, especially from the first pyramid level.

- A62 derby: Huddersfield Town vs. Oldham Athletic
- A627 derby: Oldham Athletic vs. Rochdale
- Accrington–Morecambe rivalry: Accrington Stanley vs. Morecambe
- Ashton derby: Ashton United vs. Curzon Ashton
- Blackburn–Preston rivalry: Blackburn Rovers vs. Preston North End
- Bolton–Bury rivalry: Bolton Wanderers vs. Bury
- Bolton–Oldham rivalry: Bolton Wanderers vs. Oldham Athletic
- Bolton–Tranmere rivalry: Bolton Wanderers vs. Tranmere Rovers
- Bolton–Wigan rivalry: Bolton Wanderers vs. Wigan Athletic
- Burnley–Preston rivalry: Burnley vs. Preston North End
- Bury–Oldham rivalry: Bury vs. Oldham Athletic
- Bury–Rochdale rivalry: Bury vs. Rochdale
- Cheshire derby: Games between Altrincham, Stockport County and Crewe Alexandra
- Chester–Tranmere rivalry: Chester vs. Tranmere Rovers
- Cumbrian derby: Games between Barrow, Carlisle United and Workington
- East Lancashire derby (Cotton Mills Derby): Burnley vs. Blackburn Rovers
- Etherow Valley Derby: Glossop North End vs. Stockport Town
- Fleetwood–Morecambe rivalry: Fleetwood Town vs. Morecambe
- Fleetwood–Southport rivalry: Fleetwood Town vs. Southport
- Fylde Coast derby: Blackpool vs. Fleetwood Town
- Manchester derby: Manchester City vs. Manchester United
- The Merseyside derby matches are also any combination of games between Everton/Liverpool and Tranmere Rovers/Southport
- Liverpool–Manchester City rivalry: Liverpool vs Manchester City
- Liverpool–Manchester United rivalry: Liverpool vs Manchester United
- Northwich derby: Games between 1874 Northwich, Northwich Victoria and Witton Albion
- Oldham–Stockport rivalry: Oldham Athletic vs. Stockport County
- Rules derby: Hallam vs. Sheffield; the oldest derby in football
- South Yorkshire derby:
  - Barnsley–Doncaster rivalry: Barnsley vs. Doncaster Rovers
  - Barnsley–Rotherham rivalry: Barnsley vs. Rotherham United
  - Barnsley–Sheffield United rivalry: Barnsley vs. Sheffield United
  - Barnsley–Sheffield Wednesday rivalry: Barnsley vs. Sheffield Wednesday
  - Doncaster–Rotherham rivalry: Doncaster Rovers vs. Rotherham United
- Steel City derby: Sheffield United vs. Sheffield Wednesday
- Stockport derby: Stockport Georgians vs. Stockport Town
- Tameside derby: Hyde United vs. Stalybridge Celtic
- War of the Roses derby: Leeds United vs. Manchester United
- West Lancashire derby: Blackpool vs. Preston North End
- West Yorkshire derby: refers to any match between Bradford City, Halifax Town, Huddersfield Town and Leeds United In the Northern Premier League, there is also Liversedge vs. Ossett United.
- Wool City derby: Bradford City vs. Bradford Park Avenue

=== Southern England ===
- A33 derby: Aldershot Town vs. Reading
- A36 derby: Bath City vs. Frome Town
- A4 derby: Bath City vs. Chippenham Town
- A27 derby: Bognor Regis Town vs. Whitehawk
- A259 derby: Newhaven vs. Peacehaven & Telscombe
- Bristol derby: Bristol City vs. Bristol Rovers
- Cathedral City derby: Salisbury vs. Winchester City
- Cornwall derby: Falmouth Town vs. Truro City
- Coxbridge derby: Badshot Lea vs. Farnham Town
- Creekside derby: Fareham Town vs. Portchester
- Devon derby: Games between Exeter City, Plymouth Argyle or Torquay United
- Dockyard derby: Plymouth Argyle vs. Portsmouth
- Dorset derby: Games between Dorchester Town, Poole Town, Weymouth and Wimborne Town
- Eastbourne derby: Games played between Eastbourne Borough, Eastbourne Town, Eastbourne United and Langney Wanderers
- East Sussex derby: Eastbourne Borough vs. Lewes
- Gloucestershire derby: Games played between Cheltenham Town, Forest Green Rovers and Gloucester City
- Hampshire–Surrey derby: Aldershot Town vs. Woking
- Kent derby: Gillingham vs. Maidstone United;
- M5 derby: Taunton Town vs. Tiverton Town
- Mid Hampshire derby: Totton vs. Winchester City,
- Mid-Sussex derby: Burgess Hill Town vs. Haywards Heath Town
- Mole Valley derby: Dorking Wanderers vs. Leatherhead
- New Forest derby: Bournemouth vs. Southampton
- North Devon derby: Games between Barnstaple Town, Bideford and Ilfracombe Town
- Rushmoor derby: Aldershot Town vs. Farnborough
- Seaside derby: Bognor Regis Town vs. Worthing
- Somerset derby: Bath City vs. Yeovil Town
- South Coast derby: Portsmouth vs. Southampton
- South Hampshire derby: Gosport Borough vs. Havant & Waterlooville
- South Midlands derby: Gloucester City vs. Worcester City
- Surrey derby Dorking Wanderers vs. Woking
- Sussex derby: Lewes vs. Worthing
- Thanet derby: Margate vs. Ramsgate
- West Country derby:
  - Bristol Rovers vs. Exeter City
  - Bristol City vs. Plymouth Argyle
  - Bristol Rovers vs. Torquay United
  - Exeter City vs. Plymouth Argyle
  - Weymouth vs. Yeovil Town

=== Wales ===
- A40 Derby: Haverfordwest County vs. Carmarthen Town
- Anglesey derby: Llanfairpwll vs. Llangefni Town
- Flintshire derby: Connah's Quay Nomads vs. Flint Town United
- Gwynedd derby: Games between Bangor City, Caernarfon Town or and Porthmadog
- South Wales derby: Games between Cardiff City, Newport County and Swansea City

=== Inter-regional ===
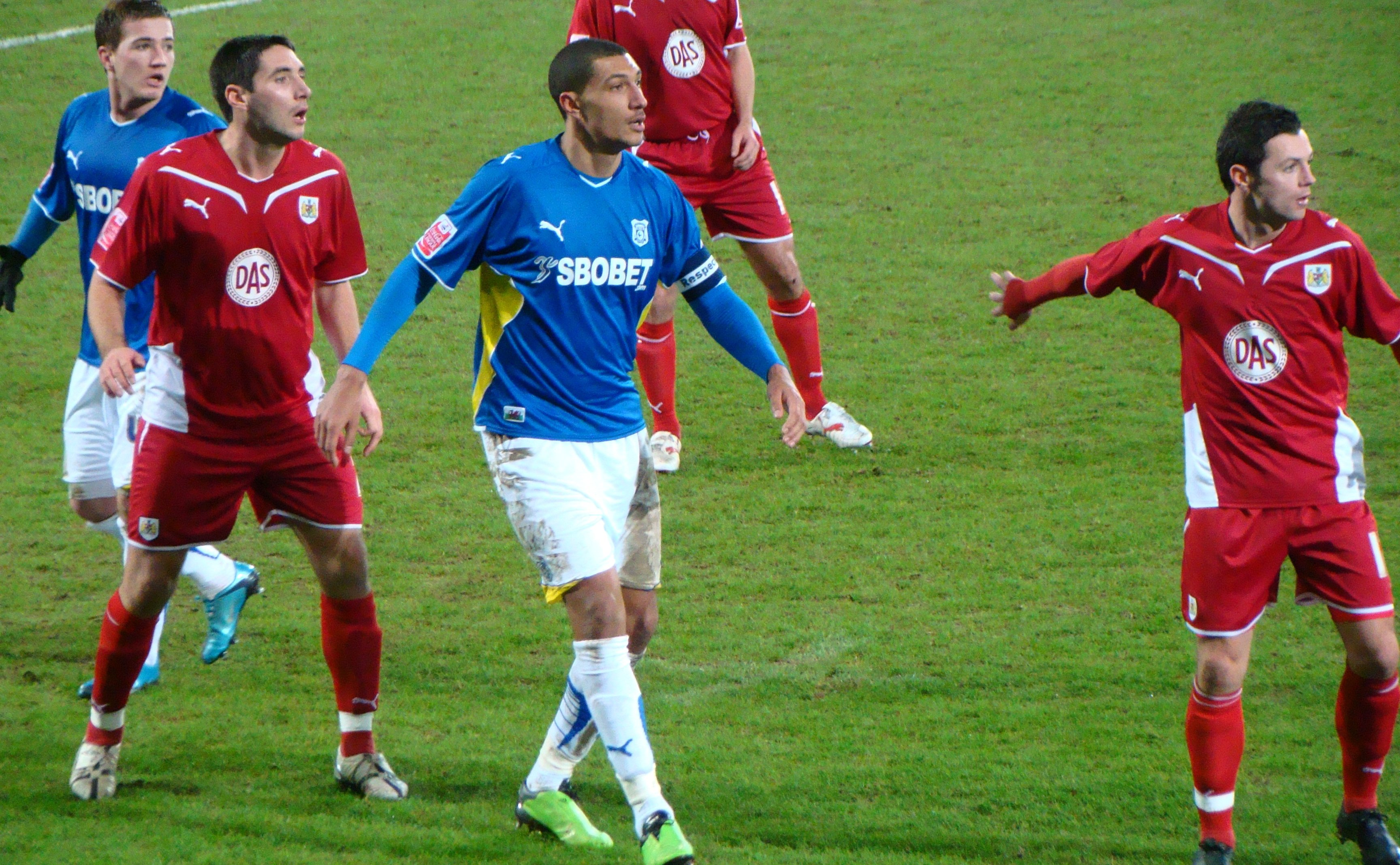
The Severnside derby spans England and Wales.

These matches involve at least one football club in the second pyramid level and lower, and/or that have experienced at least one relegation and one promotion, especially from the first pyramid level.

- A13 derby: Leyton Orient vs. Southend United
- A500 derby: Crewe Alexandra vs. Port Vale
- Aldershot–Reading rivalry: Aldershot Town vs. Reading
- Cambridge–Colchester rivalry: Cambridge United vs. Colchester United
- Chesterfield–Sheffield rivalry: Chesterfield vs. Sheffield United or Sheffield Wednesday
- Crewe–Walsall rivalry: Crewe Alexandra vs. Walsall
- Dons derby: AFC Wimbledon vs. Milton Keynes Dons
- England–Wales rivalries:
  - Cardiff City–Leeds United rivalry: Cardiff City vs Leeds United
  - Cross-border derby: Chester vs. Wrexham
  - Severnside derby: Primarily refers to Bristol City vs. Cardiff City but may also refer to Bristol Rovers or Newport County
  - Shrewsbury–Wrexham rivalry: Shrewsbury Town vs. Wrexham
  - Tranmere–Wrexham rivalry: Tranmere Rovers vs. Wrexham
- Gillingham–London rivalries:
  - Gillingham–Charlton Rivalry: Gillingham vs. Charlton Athletic
  - Gillingham–Millwall Rivalry: Gillingham vs. Millwall
- Gillingham–Southend rivalry: Gillingham vs. Southend United
- Gillingham–Swindon Rivalry: Gillingham vs. Swindon Town
- Hertfordshire–London rivalries:
  - Barnet–Boreham Wood rivalry: Barnet vs. Boreham Wood
  - Boreham Wood–Wealdstone rivalry: Boreham Wood vs. Wealdstone
  - Brentford–Watford rivalry: Brentford vs. Watford
  - Crystal Palace–Watford rivalry: Crystal Palace vs. Watford
  - QPR–Watford rivalry: Queens Park Rangers vs. Watford
- Leeds–Midlands rivalries:
  - Birmingham–Leeds rivalry: Birmingham City vs. Leeds United
  - Leeds–Leicester rivalry: Leeds United vs. Leicester City
- London–Leeds rivalries:
  - Brentford–Leeds rivalry: Brentford vs. Leeds United
  - Chelsea–Leeds rivalry: Chelsea vs. Leeds United
  - Leeds United–Millwall rivalry: Leeds United vs. Millwall
- London–Liverpool rivalries:
  - Chelsea–Liverpool rivalry: Chelsea F.C. vs. Liverpool F.C.
  - Everton–Millwall rivalry: Millwall F.C. vs. Everton F.C.
- London–Manchester rivalries:
  - Arsenal–Manchester City rivalry: Arsenal vs. Manchester City
  - Arsenal–Manchester United rivalry: Arsenal vs. Manchester United
- Luton–York rivalry: Luton Town vs. York City
- M23 derby: Brighton & Hove Albion vs. Crystal Palace

=== Discontinued derbies ===
- A49 derby: Hereford United vs Shrewsbury Town
- Aldershot–Reading rivalry: Aldershot vs. Reading
- Bishop Auckland–Spennymoor derby: Bishop Auckland vs. Spennymoor United
- Cheshire derby:
  - Altrincham–Macclesfield rivalry: Altrincham vs. Macclesfield Town
  - Chester vs. Macclesfield Town
  - Crewe Alexandra vs. Macclesfield Town
- Crystal Palace–Wimbledon derby: Crystal Palace vs. Wimbledon
- Denbighshire derby: Prestatyn Town vs. Rhyl
- Dorking derby: Dorking vs. Dorking Wanderers
- Halifax–York rivalry: Halifax Town vs. York City
- North Wales derby: Rhyl F.C. vs. Bangor City
- Ossett derby: Ossett Albion vs. Ossett Town
- North Yorkshire derby: Scarborough vs. York City
- Shropshire derby: Shrewsbury Town vs. Telford United
- Sunderland derby: Sunderland vs. Sunderland Albion
- Walton derby: Walton Casuals vs Walton & Hersham
- West Yorkshire derby: Only those derbies are defunct that included the now defunct club Halifax Town vs. Bradford City, Huddersfield Town or Leeds United
- Wirral derby: New Brighton vs. Tranmere Rovers

== Northern Ireland ==
- Belfast derbies:
  - Big Two derby: Linfield v Glentoran
  - North Belfast derby: Crusaders v Cliftonville
  - Linfield v Cliftonville
  - Donegal Celtic vs. Linfield
  - Glentoran vs. Crusaders or Cliftonville
- Mid-Ulster derby: Glenavon vs. Portadown
- A26 derby: Ballymena United vs. Coleraine
- North Down derby: Ards vs. Bangor F.C.
- East Antrim derby: Carrick Rangers vs. Larne vs. Ballyclare Comrades
- Lurgan derby: Glenavon vs. Lurgan Celtic
- North-West derby: Coleraine vs. Limavady United vs. Institute
- Mourne derby: Newry City vs. Warrenpoint Town

== Scotland ==
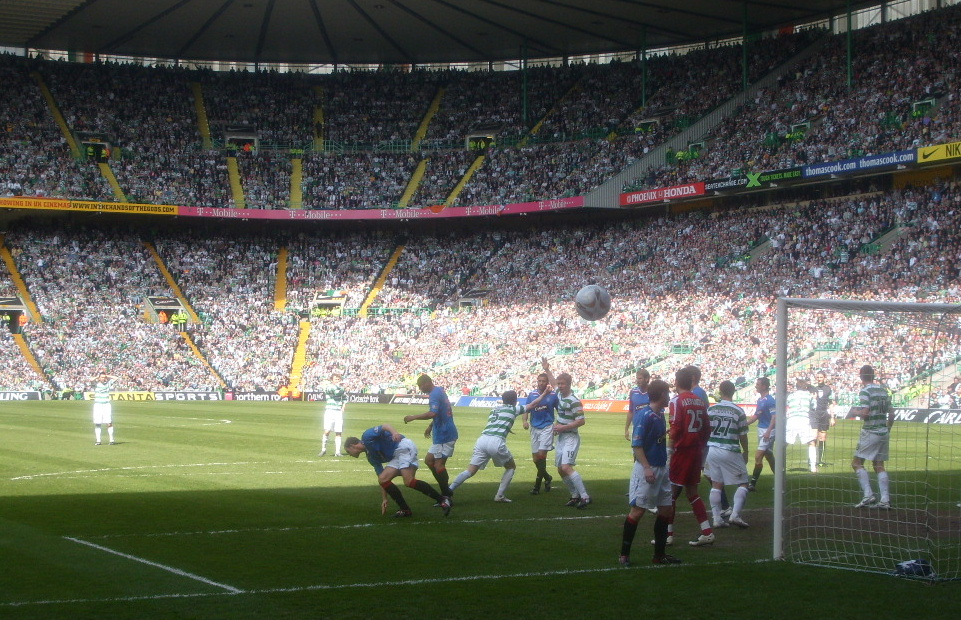
An Old Firm match in 2008

=== Local Derbies ===
- Dundee derby: Dundee vs. Dundee United
- Edinburgh derby: Heart of Midlothian vs. Hibernian
- Falkirk derby: East Stirlingshire vs. Falkirk
- Other Edinburgh Derby: Any combination of Civil Service Strollers, Edinburgh City and Spartans
- Glasgow Derby: Any combination of Celtic, Clyde, Partick Thistle, Queen's Park and Rangers
- Old Firm: Celtic vs. Rangers
- Original Glasgow derby: Queen's Park vs. Rangers

=== Regional Derbies ===
- Angus derby: any combination of Arbroath, Brechin City, Forfar Athletic and Montrose
- Ayrshire derby: Ayr United vs. Kilmarnock
- Dumfries & Galloway derby: Queen of the South vs Stranraer. Can also include Annan Athletic
- Fife derby: any combination of Dunfermline Athletic, Raith Rovers, Kelty Hearts, Cowdenbeath and East Fife
- Highland derby: Inverness Caledonian Thistle vs. Ross County
- Lanarkshire derby: any combination of Airdrieonians, Albion Rovers, Hamilton Academical and Motherwell
- Monklands derby: Albion Rovers vs. Airdrieonians
- Renfrewshire derby: Greenock Morton vs. St Mirren
- Tayside derby: St Johnstone vs. Dundee or Dundee United

=== Inter-Regional and National Derbies ===
- Aberdeen F.C.–Rangers F.C. rivalry: Aberdeen vs. Rangers
- Dunfermline Athletic F.C.–Falkirk F.C. rivalry: Dunfermline Athletic vs. Falkirk
- North derby: Aberdeen vs. Inverness Caledonian Thistle
- New Firm: Aberdeen vs. Dundee United

== See also ==
- List of sports rivalries in the United Kingdom – which lists other sports rivalries in the United Kingdom
- List of association football rivalries – which lists other football club rivalries around the world
