= 1973–74 Football League First Division =

1973–74 season of Football League First Division

Football League First Division
- Season: 1973–74
- Champions: Leeds United; 2nd English title
- Relegated: Southampton; Manchester United; Norwich City
- European Cup: Leeds United
- European Cup Winners' Cup: Liverpool
- UEFA Cup: Derby County; Ipswich Town; Stoke City; Wolverhampton Wanderers
- Matches: 462
- Goals: 1,107 (2.4 per match)
- Top goalscorer: Mick Channon (21 goals)
- Biggest home win: Ipswich Town 7–0 Southampton (2 February 1974)
- Biggest away win: Norwich City 0–4 Arsenal (15 September 1973)
- Highest scoring: Derby County 6–2 Southampton (22 September 1973)

Statistics of Football League First Division in the 1973–74 season.

== Overview ==
Leeds United won the First Division title under the management of Don Revie for the second time in their history. The title was confirmed on 24 April, after title challengers Liverpool lost 1–0 at home to Arsenal.

Relegation was increased from two teams to three this season. Norwich City were relegated on 20 April, despite beating Burnley 1–0 at Carrow Road, Southampton's 1–1 draw with Manchester United sent the Canaries down. Manchester United went down on 27 April, after losing 1–0 at home to their fierce rivals Manchester City and Birmingham City's result going against them with a 2–1 win against relegated Norwich City at St Andrew's. Southampton were also relegated because of Birmingham City's result despite winning 3–0 at Everton.

== League standings ==
Pos	Team	Pld	W	D	L	GF	GA	GAv	Pts	Qualification or relegation
1	Leeds United (C)	42	24	14	4	66	31	2.129	62	Qualification for the European Cup first round
2	Liverpool	42	22	13	7	52	31	1.677	57	Qualification for the European Cup Winners' Cup first round (Note: Liverpool qualified for the European Cup Winners' Cup as the 1973-74 FA Cup winners.)
3	Derby County	42	17	14	11	52	42	1.238	48	Qualification for the UEFA Cup first round
4	Ipswich Town	42	18	11	13	67	58	1.155	47	Qualification for the UEFA Cup first round
5	Stoke City	42	15	16	11	54	42	1.286	46	Qualification for the UEFA Cup first round
6	Burnley	42	16	14	12	56	53	1.057	46	
7	Everton	42	16	12	14	50	48	1.042	44	
8	Queens Park Rangers	42	13	17	12	56	52	1.077	43	
9	Leicester City	42	13	16	13	51	41	1.244	42	
10	Arsenal	42	14	14	14	49	51	0.961	42	
11	Tottenham Hotspur	42	14	14	14	45	50	0.900	42	
12	Wolverhampton Wanderers	42	13	15	14	49	49	1.000	41	Qualification for the UEFA Cup first round (Note: Wolverhampton Wanderers qualified for the UEFA Cup as the 1973-74 Football League Cup winners.)
13	Sheffield United	42	14	12	16	44	49	0.898	40	
14	Manchester City	42	14	12	16	39	46	0.848	40	
15	Newcastle United	42	13	12	17	49	48	1.021	38	
16	Coventry City	42	14	10	18	43	54	0.796	38	
17	Chelsea	42	12	13	17	56	60	0.933	37	
18	West Ham United	42	11	15	16	55	60	0.917	37	
19	Birmingham City	42	12	13	17	52	64	0.813	37	
20	Southampton (R)	42	11	14	17	47	68	0.691	36	Relegation to the Second Division
21	Manchester United (R)	42	10	12	20	38	48	0.792	32	Relegation to the Second Division
22	Norwich City (R)	42	7	15	20	37	62	0.597	29	Relegation to the Second Division

Source: World Football
Rules for classification: 1) Points; 2) Goal average; 3) Goals scored
(C) Champions; (R) Relegated

== Results ==
Home \ Away	ARS	BIR	BUR	CHE	COV	DER	EVE	IPS	LEE	LEI	LIV	MCI	MUN	NEW	NWC	QPR	SHU	SOU	STK	TOT	WHU	WOL
Arsenal		1–0	1–1	0–0	2–2	2–0	1–0	1–1	1–2	0–2	0–2	2–0	3–0	0–1	2–0	1–1	1–0	1–0	2–1	0–1	0–0	2–2
Birmingham City	3–1		2–2	2–4	1–0	0–0	0–2	0–3	1–1	3–0	1–1	1–1	1–0	1–0	2–1	4–0	1–0	1–1	0–0	1–2	3–1	2–1
Burnley	2–1	2–1		1–0	2–2	1–1	3–1	0–1	0–0	0–0	2–1	3–0	0–0	1–1	1–0	2–1	1–2	3–0	1–0	2–2	1–1	1–1
Chelsea	1–3	3–1	3–0		1–0	1–1	3–1	2–3	1–2	3–2	0–1	1–0	1–3	1–0	3–0	3–3	1–2	4–0	0–1	0–0	2–4	2–2
Coventry City	3–3	0–1	1–1	2–2		1–0	1–2	0–1	0–0	1–2	1–0	2–1	1–0	2–2	1–0	0–1	3–1	2–0	2–0	1–0	0–1	1–0
Derby County	1–1	1–1	5–1	1–0	1–0		2–1	2–0	0–0	2–1	3–1	1–0	2–2	1–0	1–1	1–2	4–1	6–2	1–1	2–0	1–1	2–0
Everton	1–0	4–1	1–0	1–1	1–0	2–1		3–0	0–0	1–1	0–1	2–0	1–0	1–1	4–1	1–0	1–1	0–3	1–1	1–1	1–0	2–1
Ipswich Town	2–2	3–0	3–2	1–1	3–0	3–0	3–0		0–3	1–1	1–1	2–1	2–1	1–3	1–1	1–0	0–1	7–0	1–1	0–0	1–3	2–0
Leeds United	3–1	3–0	1–4	1–1	3–0	2–0	3–1	3–2		1–1	1–0	1–0	0–0	1–1	1–0	2–2	0–0	2–1	1–1	1–1	4–1	4–1
Leicester City	2–0	3–3	2–0	3–0	0–2	0–1	2–1	5–0	2–2		1–1	1–1	1–0	1–0	3–0	2–0	1–1	0–1	1–1	3–0	0–1	2–2
Liverpool	0–1	3–2	1–0	1–0	2–1	2–0	0–0	4–2	1–0	1–1		4–0	2–0	2–1	1–0	2–1	1–0	1–0	1–0	3–2	1–0	1–0
Manchester City	1–2	3–1	2–0	3–2	1–0	1–0	1–1	1–3	0–1	2–0	1–1		0–0	2–1	2–1	1–0	0–1	1–1	0–0	0–0	2–1	1–1
Manchester United	1–1	1–0	3–3	2–2	2–3	0–1	3–0	2–0	0–2	1–2	0–0	0–1		1–0	0–0	2–1	1–2	0–0	1–0	0–1	3–1	0–0
Newcastle United	1–1	1–1	1–2	2–0	5–1	0–2	2–1	3–1	0–1	1–1	0–0	1–0	3–2		0–0	2–3	1–0	0–1	2–1	0–2	1–1	2–0
Norwich City	0–4	2–1	1–0	2–2	0–0	2–4	1–3	1–2	0–1	1–0	1–1	1–1	0–2	1–1		0–0	2–1	2–0	4–0	1–1	2–2	1–1
Queens Park Rangers	2–0	2–2	2–1	1–1	3–0	0–0	1–0	0–1	0–1	0–0	2–2	3–0	3–0	3–2	1–2		0–0	1–1	3–3	3–1	0–0	0–0
Sheffield United	5–0	1–1	0–2	1–2	0–1	3–0	1–1	0–3	0–2	1–1	1–0	1–2	0–1	1–1	1–0	1–1		4–2	0–0	2–2	1–0	1–0
Southampton	1–1	0–2	2–2	0–0	1–1	1–1	2–0	2–0	1–2	1–0	1–0	0–2	1–1	3–1	2–2	2–2	3–0		3–0	1–1	1–1	2–1
Stoke City	0–0	5–2	4–0	1–0	3–0	0–0	0–0	1–1	3–2	1–0	1–1	1–1	1–0	2–1	2–0	4–1	1–2	4–1		1–0	2–0	2–3
Tottenham Hotspur	2–0	4–2	2–3	1–2	2–1	1–0	0–2	1–1	0–3	1–0	1–1	0–2	2–1	0–2	0–0	0–0	1–2	3–1	2–1		2–0	1–3
West Ham United	1–3	0–0	0–1	3–0	2–3	0–0	4–3	3–3	3–1	1–1	2–2	2–1	2–1	1–2	4–2	2–3	2–2	4–1	0–2	0–1		0–0
Wolverhampton Wanderers	3–1	1–0	0–2	2–0	1–1	4–0	1–1	3–1	0–2	1–0	0–1	0–0	2–1	1–0	3–1	2–4	2–0	2–1	1–1	1–1	0–0	

Updated to match(es) played on unknown. Source: Ian Laschke: Rothmans Book of Football League Records 1888–89 to 1978–79. Macdonald and Jane's, London & Sydney, 1980.
Legend: Blue = home team win; Yellow = draw; Red = away team win.

== Managerial changes ==
Team	Outgoing manager	Manner of departure	Date of vacancy	Position in table	Incoming manager	Date of appointment
Everton	(England) Tom Eggleston	End of caretaker spell	28 May 1973	Pre-season	(Northern Ireland) Billy Bingham	1 June 1974
Derby County	(England) Brian Clough	Sacked	15 October 1973	3rd	(Scotland) Dave Mackay	22 October 1973
Manchester City	(England) Johnny Hart	Illness	23 October 1973	10th	(England) Ron Saunders	22 November 1973
Southampton	(England) Ted Bates	Became general manager	17 November 1973	8th	(England) Lawrie McMenemy	22 November 1973
Norwich City	(England) Ron Saunders	Signed by Manchester City	22 November 1973	20th	(England) John Bond	27 November 1973
Sheffield United	(Scotland) John Harris	Retired	5 December 1973	14th	(England) Ken Furphy	7 December 1973
Manchester City	(England) Ron Saunders	Sacked	12 April 1974	16th	(England) Tony Book	12 April 1974

== Team locations ==
Locations of the Football League First Division 1973–1974 teams
Locations of the Football League First Division London teams 1973–1974

== Top scorers ==
Rank	Player	Club	Goals
1	(England) Mick Channon	Southampton	21
2	(England) Frank Worthington	Leicester City	20
3	(England) Kevin Hector	Derby County	19
=	(England) Stan Bowles	Queens Park Rangers	19
5	(England) Bob Latchford	Birmingham City / Everton	17
=	(England) Martin Chivers	Tottenham Hotspur	17
=	(England) Alan Woodward	Sheffield United	17
8	(Northern Ireland) Bryan Hamilton	Ipswich Town	16
