= 1975–76 Football League First Division =

1975–76 season of Football League First Division

Football League First Division
- Season: 1975–76
- Champions: Liverpool; 9th title
- Relegated: Burnley; Sheffield United; Wolverhampton Wanderers
- European Cup: Liverpool
- UEFA Cup: Queens Park Rangers; Manchester United; Derby County; Manchester City
- Matches: 462
- Goals: 1,230 (2.66 per match)
- Top goalscorer: Ted MacDougall (23 goals)
- Biggest home win: Arsenal 5–0 Coventry City (11 October 1975); Queens Park Rangers 5–0 Everton (11 October 1975); Arsenal 6–1 West Ham United (20 March 1976); Tottenham Hotspur 5–0 Sheffield United (27 March 1976); Wolverhampton Wanderers 5–0 Newcastle United (10 April 1976)
- Biggest away win: Birmingham City 1–5 West Ham United (1 November 1975); Burnley 1–5 Wolverhampton Wanderers (15 November 1975); Derby County 1–5 Queens Park Rangers (23 April 1976); Ipswich Town 2–6 Derby County (24 April 1976)
- Highest scoring: Norwich City 5–3 Aston Villa (23 April 1976)

Statistics of Football League First Division in the 1975–76 season.

== Overview ==
Liverpool won the First Division title for the ninth time in the club's history that season and the first under manager Bob Paisley. They won the title on their last game of the season on 4 May, 1976, beating relegated Wolverhampton Wanderers 3–1 at Molineux. Had they lost, Queens Park Rangers would have been champions, having beaten Leeds United 2–0 at Loftus Road in their last game. Despite that, QPR still managed to finish in their highest ever position of runners-up and qualified for the UEFA Cup.

Sheffield United's relegation was confirmed on 27 March after losing 5–0 to Tottenham Hotspur. Burnley went down on 19 April after a 1–0 loss at home to Manchester United and Wolverhampton Wanderers went down on the final day of the campaign after their 3–1 loss to Liverpool.

== League standings ==
Pos	Team	Pld	W	D	L	GF	GA	GAv	Pts	Qualification or relegation
1	Liverpool (C)	42	23	14	5	66	31	2.129	60	Qualification for the European Cup first round
2	Queens Park Rangers	42	24	11	7	67	33	2.030	59	Qualification for the UEFA Cup first round
3	Manchester United	42	23	10	9	68	42	1.619	56	Qualification for the UEFA Cup first round
4	Derby County	42	21	11	10	75	58	1.293	53	Qualification for the UEFA Cup first round
5	Leeds United	42	21	9	12	65	46	1.413	51	
6	Ipswich Town	42	16	14	12	54	48	1.125	46	
7	Leicester City	42	13	19	10	48	51	0.941	45	
8	Manchester City	42	16	11	15	64	46	1.391	43	Qualification for the UEFA Cup first round
9	Tottenham Hotspur	42	14	15	13	63	63	1.000	43	
10	Norwich City	42	16	10	16	58	58	1.000	42	
11	Everton	42	15	12	15	60	66	0.909	42	
12	Stoke City	42	15	11	16	48	50	0.960	41	
13	Middlesbrough	42	15	10	17	46	45	1.022	40	
14	Coventry City	42	13	14	15	47	57	0.825	40	
15	Newcastle United	42	15	9	18	71	62	1.145	39	
16	Aston Villa	42	11	17	14	51	59	0.864	39	
17	Arsenal	42	13	10	19	47	53	0.887	36	
18	West Ham United	42	13	10	19	48	71	0.676	36	
19	Birmingham City	42	13	7	22	57	75	0.760	33	
20	Wolverhampton Wanderers (R)	42	10	10	22	51	68	0.750	30	Relegation to the Second Division
21	Burnley (R)	42	9	10	23	43	66	0.652	28	Relegation to the Second Division
22	Sheffield United (R)	42	6	10	26	33	82	0.402	22	Relegation to the Second Division

Source: World Football
Rules for classification: 1) Points; 2) Goal average; 3) Goals scored
(C) Champions; (R) Relegated

== Results ==
Home \ Away	ARS	AST	BIR	BUR	COV	DER	EVE	IPS	LEE	LEI	LIV	MCI	MUN	MID	NEW	NWC	QPR	SHU	STK	TOT	WHU	WOL
Arsenal		0–0	1–0	1–0	5–0	0–1	2–2	1–2	1–2	1–1	1–0	2–3	3–1	2–1	0–0	2–1	2–0	1–0	0–1	0–2	6–1	2–1
Aston Villa	2–0		2–1	1–1	1–0	1–0	3–1	0–0	1–2	1–1	0–0	1–0	2–1	2–1	1–1	3–2	0–2	5–1	0–0	1–1	4–1	1–1
Birmingham City	3–1	3–2		4–0	1–1	2–1	0–1	3–0	2–2	2–1	0–1	2–1	0–2	2–1	3–2	1–1	1–1	2–0	1–1	3–1	1–5	0–1
Burnley	0–0	2–2	1–0		1–3	1–2	1–1	0–1	0–1	1–0	0–0	0–0	0–1	4–1	0–1	4–4	1–0	3–1	0–1	1–2	2–0	1–5
Coventry City	1–1	1–1	3–2	1–2		1–1	1–2	0–0	0–1	0–2	0–0	2–0	1–1	0–1	1–1	1–0	1–1	1–0	0–3	2–2	2–0	3–1
Derby County	2–0	2–0	4–2	3–0	2–0		1–3	1–0	3–2	2–2	1–1	1–0	2–1	3–2	3–2	3–1	1–5	3–2	1–1	2–3	2–1	3–2
Everton	0–0	2–1	5–2	2–3	1–4	2–0		3–3	1–3	1–1	0–0	1–1	1–1	3–1	3–0	1–1	0–2	3–0	2–1	1–0	2–0	3–0
Ipswich Town	2–0	3–0	4–2	0–0	1–1	2–6	1–0		2–1	1–1	2–0	2–1	3–0	0–3	0–3	2–0	1–1	1–1	1–1	1–2	4–0	3–0
Leeds United	3–0	1–0	3–0	2–1	2–0	1–1	5–2	1–0		4–0	0–3	2–1	1–2	0–2	3–0	0–3	2–1	0–1	2–0	1–1	1–1	3–0
Leicester City	2–1	2–2	3–3	3–2	0–3	2–1	1–0	0–0	2–1		1–1	1–0	2–1	0–0	1–0	0–0	0–1	1–1	1–1	2–3	3–3	2–0
Liverpool	2–2	3–0	3–1	2–0	1–1	1–1	1–0	3–3	2–0	1–0		1–0	3–1	0–2	2–0	1–3	2–0	1–0	5–3	3–2	2–2	2–0
Manchester City	3–1	2–1	2–0	0–0	4–2	4–3	3–0	1–1	0–1	1–1	0–3		2–2	4–0	4–0	3–0	0–0	4–0	1–0	2–1	3–0	3–2
Manchester United	3–1	2–0	3–1	2–1	1–1	1–1	2–1	1–0	3–2	0–0	0–0	2–0		3–0	1–0	1–0	2–1	5–1	0–1	3–2	4–0	1–0
Middlesbrough	0–1	0–0	2–0	1–1	2–0	0–2	1–1	2–0	0–0	0–1	0–1	1–0	0–0		3–3	0–1	0–0	3–0	3–0	1–0	3–0	1–0
Newcastle United	2–0	3–0	4–0	0–1	4–0	4–3	5–0	1–1	2–3	3–0	1–2	2–1	3–4	1–1		5–2	1–2	1–1	0–1	2–2	2–1	5–1
Norwich City	3–1	5–3	1–0	3–1	0–3	0–0	4–2	1–0	1–1	2–0	0–1	2–2	1–1	0–1	1–2		3–2	1–3	0–1	3–1	1–0	1–1
Queens Park Rangers	2–1	1–1	2–1	1–0	4–1	1–1	5–0	3–1	2–0	1–0	2–0	1–0	1–0	4–2	1–0	2–0		1–0	3–2	0–0	1–1	4–2
Sheffield United	1–3	2–1	1–1	2–1	0–1	1–1	0–0	1–2	0–2	1–2	0–0	2–2	1–4	1–1	1–0	0–1	0–0		0–2	1–2	3–2	1–4
Stoke City	2–1	1–1	1–0	4–1	0–1	1–0	3–2	0–1	3–2	1–2	1–1	0–0	0–1	1–0	1–1	0–2	0–1	2–1		1–2	1–2	2–2
Tottenham Hotspur	0–0	5–2	1–3	2–1	4–1	2–3	2–2	1–1	0–0	1–1	0–4	2–2	1–1	1–0	0–3	2–2	0–3	5–0	1–1		1–1	2–1
West Ham United	1–0	2–2	1–2	3–2	1–1	1–2	0–1	1–2	1–1	1–1	0–4	1–0	2–1	2–1	2–1	0–1	1–0	2–0	3–1	1–0		0–0
Wolverhampton Wanderers	0–0	0–0	2–0	3–2	0–1	0–0	1–2	1–0	1–1	2–2	1–3	0–4	0–2	1–2	5–0	1–0	2–2	5–1	2–1	0–1	0–1	

Updated to match(es) played on unknown. Source: Ian Laschke: Rothmans Book of Football League Records 1888–89 to 1978–79. Macdonald and Jane’s, London & Sydney, 1980.
Legend: Blue = home team win; Yellow = draw; Red = away team win.

== Managerial changes ==
Team	Outgoing manager	Manner of departure	Date of vacancy	Position in table	Incoming manager	Date of appointment
Newcastle United	(England) Joe Harvey	Sacked	11 June 1975	Pre-season	(England) Gordon Lee	17 June 1975
Birmingham City	(England) Freddie Goodwin	Resigned	18 September 1975	21st	(Scotland) Willie Bell	18 September 1975
Sheffield United	(England) Ken Furphy	Sacked	6 October 1975	22nd	(Scotland) Jimmy Sirrel	8 October 1975
Burnley	(England) Jimmy Adamson	Resigned	6 January 1976	20th	(England) Joe Brown	6 January 1976
Wolverhampton Wanderers	(England) Bill McGarry	Sacked	1 May 1976	20th	(England) Sammy Chung	1 May 1976

== Maps ==
Locations of the Football League First Division 1975–1976 teams
Locations of the Football League First Division London teams 1975–1976

== Top scorers ==
Rank	Player	Club	Goals
1	(Scotland) Ted MacDougall	Norwich City	23
2	(Scotland) John Duncan	Tottenham Hotspur	20
3	(England) Malcolm Macdonald	Newcastle United	19
4	(England) Trevor Francis	Birmingham City	17
=	(England) John Richards	Wolverhampton Wanderers	17
5	(England) Charlie George	Derby County	16
=	(Wales) John Toshack	Liverpool	16
=	(England) Alan Gowling	Newcastle United	16
=	(England) Duncan McKenzie	Leeds United	16
