= East Midlands derby =

East Midlands derby may refer to:

== Association Football ==
- Derby County F.C.–Leicester City F.C. rivalry
- Derby County F.C.–Nottingham Forest F.C. rivalry
- Leicester City F.C.–Nottingham Forest F.C. rivalry

== Rugby Union ==
- Northampton Saints-Leicester Tigers rivalry
