= First football game =

First football game may refer to:

- The 1860 Rules derby, the oldest football fixture in the world
- 1869 college football season, the first season of intercollegiate football in the United States
