= 1964–65 Football League First Division =

1964–65 season of Football League First Division

Football League First Division
- Season: 1964–65
- Champions: Manchester United; 6th English title
- Relegated: Wolverhampton Wanderers; Birmingham City
- European Cup: Manchester United
- European Cup Winners' Cup: Liverpool; West Ham United
- Inter-Cities Fairs Cup: Leeds United; Chelsea; Everton
- Matches: 462
- Goals: 1,543 (3.34 per match)
- Top goalscorer: Andy McEvoy; Jimmy Greaves (29 goals each)

Statistics of Football League First Division in the 1964-65 season.

== Overview ==
Manchester United won the First Division title for the sixth time in the club's history that season, ahead of newly-promoted Leeds United after Leeds drew their final game of the season (3-3) against already relegated Birmingham City; whilst Manchester United, with still one further game to play, beat Arsenal 3-1 at Old Trafford, the celebratory third goal coming from Denis Law. With both Leeds and Manchester United level on 61 points, and in those days in such an event, the title being decided on goal average, Manchester United enjoyed such a superior goal average to render their final league game of the season (a 2-1 defeat away to Aston Villa) as all but irrelevant.

== League standings ==
Pos	Team	Pld	W	D	L	GF	GA	GAv	Pts	Qualification or relegation
1	Manchester United (C)	42	26	9	7	89	39	2.282	61	Qualification for the European Cup preliminary round
2	Leeds United	42	26	9	7	83	52	1.596	61	Qualification for the Inter-Cities Fairs Cup first round
3	Chelsea	42	24	8	10	89	54	1.648	56	Qualification for the Inter-Cities Fairs Cup first round
4	Everton	42	17	15	10	69	60	1.150	49	Qualification for the Inter-Cities Fairs Cup first round
5	Nottingham Forest	42	17	13	12	71	67	1.060	47	
6	Tottenham Hotspur	42	19	7	16	87	71	1.225	45	
7	Liverpool	42	17	10	15	67	73	0.918	44	Qualification for the European Cup Winners' Cup first round (Note: Liverpool qualified for the European Cup Winners' Cup as the 1964–65 FA Cup winners.)
8	Sheffield Wednesday	42	16	11	15	57	55	1.036	43	
9	West Ham United	42	19	4	19	82	71	1.155	42	Qualification for the European Cup Winners' Cup first round (Note: West Ham United qualified for the European Cup Winners' Cup as the 1964–65 European Cup Winners' Cup winners.)
10	Blackburn Rovers	42	16	10	16	83	79	1.051	42	
11	Stoke City	42	16	10	16	67	66	1.015	42	
12	Burnley	42	16	10	16	70	70	1.000	42	
13	Arsenal	42	17	7	18	69	75	0.920	41	
14	West Bromwich Albion	42	13	13	16	70	65	1.077	39	
15	Sunderland	42	14	9	19	64	74	0.865	37	
16	Aston Villa	42	16	5	21	57	82	0.695	37	
17	Blackpool	42	12	11	19	67	78	0.859	35	
18	Leicester City	42	11	13	18	69	85	0.812	35	
19	Sheffield United	42	12	11	19	50	64	0.781	35	
20	Fulham	42	11	12	19	60	78	0.769	34	
21	Wolverhampton Wanderers (R)	42	13	4	25	59	89	0.663	30	Relegation to the Second Division
22	Birmingham City (R)	42	8	11	23	64	96	0.667	27	Relegation to the Second Division

Source: World Football
Rules for classification: 1) Points; 2) Goal average; 3) Goals scored
(C) Champions; (R) Relegated

== Results ==
Home \ Away	ARS	AST	BIR	BLB	BLP	BUR	CHE	EVE	FUL	LEE	LEI	LIV	MUN	NOT	SHU	SHW	STK	SUN	TOT	WBA	WHU	WOL
Arsenal		3–1	3–0	1–1	3–1	3–2	1–3	3–1	2–0	1–2	4–3	0–0	2–3	0–3	1–1	1–1	3–2	3–1	3–1	1–1	0–3	4–1
Aston Villa	3–1		3–0	0–4	3–2	1–0	2–2	1–2	2–0	1–2	1–0	0–1	2–1	2–1	2–1	2–0	3–0	2–1	1–0	0–1	2–3	3–2
Birmingham City	2–3	0–1		5–5	3–0	2–1	1–6	3–5	2–2	3–3	2–0	0–0	2–4	1–1	1–1	0–0	1–2	4–3	1–0	1–1	2–1	0–1
Blackburn Rovers	1–2	5–1	3–1		4–1	1–4	0–3	0–2	2–0	0–2	3–1	3–2	0–5	1–1	4–0	0–1	1–1	3–2	3–1	4–2	4–0	4–1
Blackpool	1–1	3–1	3–1	4–2		2–4	3–2	1–1	3–0	4–0	1–1	2–3	1–2	0–2	2–2	1–0	1–1	3–1	1–1	3–0	1–2	1–1
Burnley	2–1	2–2	2–0	1–1	2–2		6–2	1–1	4–0	0–1	2–1	1–5	0–0	2–2	3–1	4–1	1–0	0–0	2–2	0–1	3–2	1–1
Chelsea	2–1	2–1	3–1	5–1	2–0	0–1		5–1	1–0	2–0	4–1	4–0	0–2	0–1	3–0	1–1	4–0	3–1	3–1	2–2	0–3	2–1
Everton	1–0	3–1	1–1	2–3	0–0	2–1	1–1		2–0	0–1	2–2	2–1	3–3	1–0	1–1	1–1	1–1	1–1	4–1	3–2	1–1	5–0
Fulham	3–4	1–1	3–1	3–2	3–3	0–1	1–2	1–1		2–2	5–2	1–1	2–1	4–1	1–2	2–0	1–4	1–0	4–1	3–1	1–2	2–0
Leeds United	3–1	1–0	4–1	1–1	3–0	5–1	2–2	4–1	2–2		3–2	4–2	0–1	1–2	4–1	2–0	3–1	2–1	3–1	1–0	2–1	3–2
Leicester City	2–3	1–1	4–4	2–3	3–2	0–2	1–1	2–1	5–1	2–2		2–0	2–2	3–2	0–2	2–2	0–1	0–1	4–2	4–2	1–0	3–2
Liverpool	3–2	5–1	4–3	3–2	2–2	1–1	2–0	0–4	3–2	2–1	0–1		0–2	2–0	3–1	4–2	3–2	0–0	1–1	0–3	2–2	2–1
Manchester United	3–1	7–0	1–1	3–0	2–0	3–2	4–0	2–1	4–1	0–1	1–0	3–0		3–0	1–1	1–0	1–1	1–0	4–1	2–2	3–1	3–0
Nottingham Forest	3–0	4–2	4–3	2–5	2–0	3–1	2–2	3–1	2–3	0–0	2–1	2–2	2–2		0–0	2–2	3–1	5–2	1–2	0–0	3–2	0–2
Sheffield United	4–0	4–2	3–1	1–1	1–3	2–0	0–2	0–0	1–1	0–3	0–2	3–0	0–1	0–2		2–3	0–1	3–0	3–3	1–1	2–1	0–2
Sheffield Wednesday	2–1	3–1	5–2	1–0	4–1	5–1	2–3	0–1	1–1	3–0	0–0	1–0	1–0	0–0	0–2		1–1	2–0	1–0	1–1	2–0	2–0
Stoke City	4–1	2–1	2–1	1–1	4–2	2–0	0–2	0–2	3–1	2–3	3–3	1–1	1–2	1–1	0–1	4–1		3–1	2–0	2–0	3–1	0–2
Sunderland	0–2	2–2	2–1	1–0	1–0	3–2	3–0	4–0	0–0	3–3	3–3	2–3	1–0	4–0	3–1	3–0	2–2		2–1	2–2	3–2	1–2
Tottenham Hotspur	3–1	4–0	4–1	5–2	4–1	4–1	1–1	2–2	3–0	0–0	6–2	3–0	1–0	4–0	2–0	3–2	2–1	3–0		1–0	3–2	7–4
West Bromwich Albion	0–0	3–1	0–2	0–0	1–3	1–2	0–2	4–0	2–2	1–2	6–0	3–0	1–1	2–2	0–1	1–0	5–3	4–1	2–0		4–2	5–1
West Ham United	2–1	3–0	2–1	1–1	2–1	3–2	3–2	0–1	2–0	3–1	0–0	2–1	3–1	2–3	3–1	1–2	0–1	2–3	3–2	6–1		5–0
Wolverhampton Wanderers	0–1	0–1	0–2	4–2	1–2	1–2	0–3	2–4	0–0	0–1	1–1	1–3	2–4	1–2	1–0	3–1	3–1	3–0	3–1	3–2	4–3	

Updated to match(es) played on unknown. Source: Ian Laschke: Rothmans Book of Football League Records 1888–89 to 1978–79. Macdonald and Jane’s, London & Sydney, 1980.
Legend: Blue = home team win; Yellow = draw; Red = away team win.

== Top scorers ==
Rank	Player	Club	Goals
1	(England) Jimmy Greaves	Tottenham Hotspur	29
=	(Republic of Ireland) Andy McEvoy	Blackburn Rovers	29
2	(Scotland) Denis Law	Manchester United	28
3	(England) Fred Pickering	Everton	27
4	(England) John Ritchie	Stoke City	25
=	(England) Roger Hunt	Liverpool	25
=	(England) Joe Baker	Arsenal	25
=	(England) Johnny Byrne	West Ham United	25
=	(England) John Byrom	Blackburn Rovers	25
5	(Northern Ireland) Willie Irvine	Burnley	22
