= List of English football champions =

- Football League (1888–1892)
- Football League First Division (1892–1992)
- Premier League (1992–present)
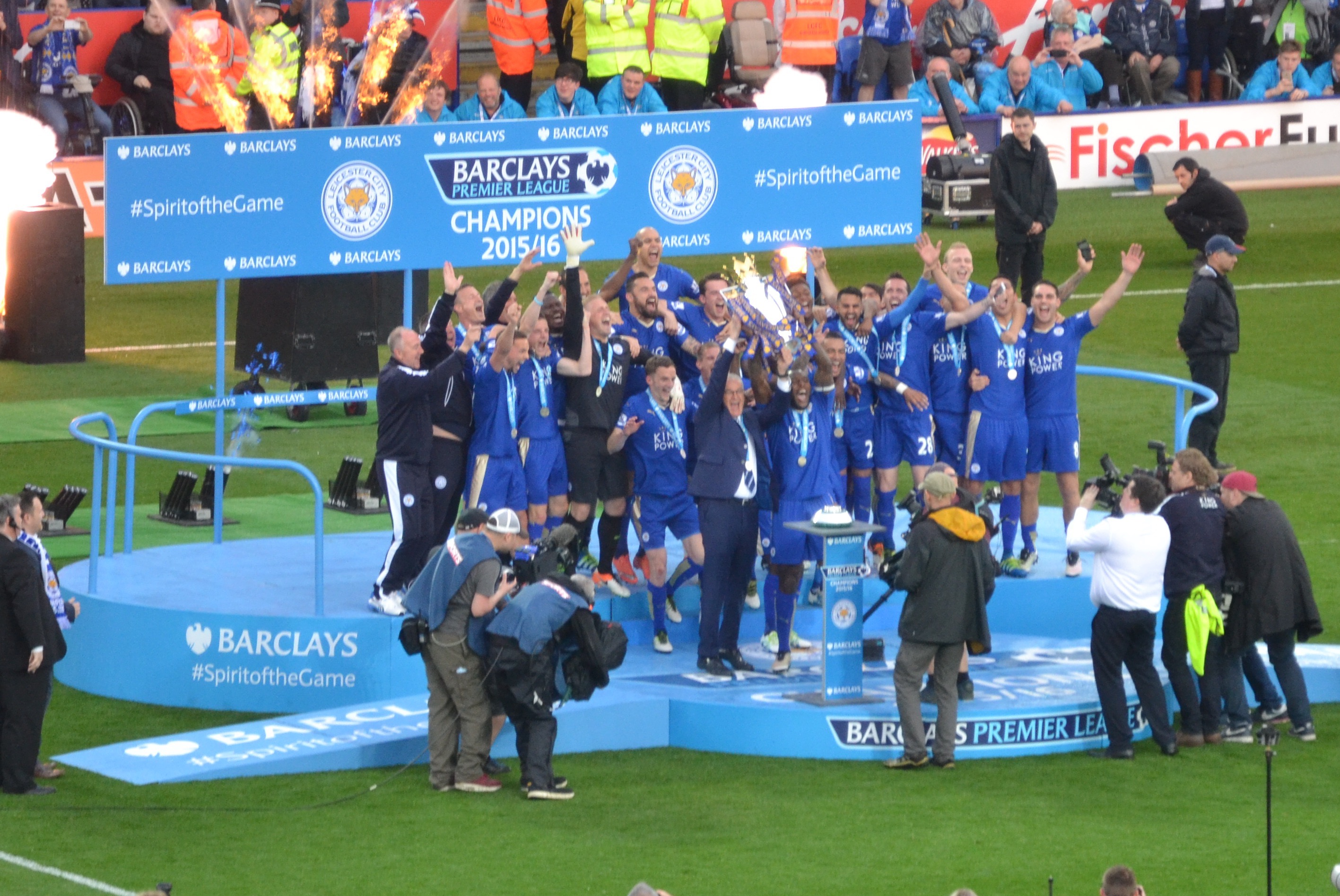
- Leicester City celebrate winning the 2015–16 Premier League

Country
- England

Founded
- 1888

Number of teams
- 24 winners

Current champions
- Arsenal (14th title) (2025–26)

Most successful club(s)
- Liverpool & Manchester United (20 titles each)

The English football champions are the annual winners of the top-tier competition in the English football league system. Following the codification of professional football by the Football Association in 1885, the Football League was established in 1888, after meetings initiated by Aston Villa director William McGregor.

The new league's inaugural season was 1888–89, and the first club to be crowned champions was Preston North End, whose team completed its fixtures unbeaten. In its first four seasons, with only twelve to fourteen clubs involved, the league was a single entity in which all the teams were from the North or the Midlands. Professionalism had been embraced more readily in those areas than in the South of England. The Football League expanded its membership in 1892 when it absorbed the rival Football Alliance. With 28 members, the league was split into two divisions. Most of the former Alliance clubs joined the new Second Division, while the original league became the First Division, with promotion and relegation between the two.

Rules stipulating a maximum wage for players were abolished in 1961. This resulted in a shift of power towards bigger clubs with more financial means. Financial considerations became an even bigger influence from 1992, when the clubs then in the First Division defected to form the FA Premier League, which became the new top tier. A series of progressively larger television contracts has put unprecedented wealth into the hands of top flight clubs.

== List of champions by season ==
Ed.	Season	Champions (number of titles)	Runners-up (number of times)	Third place
Football League (1888–1892)
1	1888–89	Preston North End (Note: Completed the season unbeaten.) (Note: Also won the FA Cup) (1)	Aston Villa (1)	Wolverhampton Wanderers
2	1889–90	Preston North End (2)	Everton (1)	Blackburn Rovers
3	1890–91	Everton (1)	Preston North End (1)	Notts County
4	1891–92	Sunderland (1)	Preston North End (2)	Bolton Wanderers
Football League First Division (1892–1992)
5	1892–93	Sunderland (2)	Preston North End (3)	Everton
6	1893–94	Aston Villa (1)	Sunderland (1)	Derby County
7	1894–95	Sunderland (3)	Everton (2)	Aston Villa
8	1895–96	Aston Villa (2)	Derby County (1)	Everton
9	1896–97	Aston Villa (3)	Sheffield United (1)	Derby County
10	1897–98	Sheffield United (1)	Sunderland (2)	Wolverhampton Wanderers
11	1898–99	Aston Villa (4)	Liverpool (1)	Burnley
12	1899–1900	Aston Villa (5)	Sheffield United (2)	Sunderland
13	1900–01	Liverpool (1)	Sunderland (3)	Notts County
14	1901–02	Sunderland (4)	Everton (3)	Newcastle United
15	1902–03	The Wednesday (Note: Sheffield Wednesday were known as The Wednesday until 1929.) (1)	Aston Villa (2)	Sunderland
16	1903–04	The Wednesday (2)	Manchester City (1)	Everton
17	1904–05	Newcastle United (1)	Everton (4)	Manchester City
18	1905–06	Liverpool (2)	Preston North End (4)	The Wednesday
19	1906–07	Newcastle United (2)	Bristol City (1)	Everton
20	1907–08	Manchester United (1)	Aston Villa (3)	Manchester City
21	1908–09	Newcastle United (3)	Everton (5)	Sunderland
22	1909–10	Aston Villa (6)	Liverpool (2)	Blackburn Rovers
23	1910–11	Manchester United (2)	Aston Villa (4)	Sunderland
24	1911–12	Blackburn Rovers (1)	Everton (6)	Newcastle United
25	1912–13	Sunderland (5)	Aston Villa (5)	The Wednesday
26	1913–14	Blackburn Rovers (2)	Aston Villa (6)	Middlesbrough
27	1914–15	Everton (2)	Oldham Athletic (1)	Blackburn Rovers
–	1915–16 to 1918–19	League suspended due to the First World War		
28	1919–20	West Bromwich Albion (1)	Burnley (1)	Chelsea
29	1920–21	Burnley (1)	Manchester City (2)	Bolton Wanderers
30	1921–22	Liverpool (3)	Tottenham Hotspur (1)	Burnley
31	1922–23	Liverpool (4)	Sunderland (4)	Huddersfield Town
32	1923–24	Huddersfield Town (1)	Cardiff City (1)	Sunderland
33	1924–25	Huddersfield Town (2)	West Bromwich Albion (1)	Bolton Wanderers
34	1925–26	Huddersfield Town (3)	Arsenal (1)	Sunderland
35	1926–27	Newcastle United (4)	Huddersfield Town (1)	Sunderland
36	1927–28	Everton (3)	Huddersfield Town (2)	Leicester City
37	1928–29	The Wednesday (3)	Leicester City (1)	Aston Villa
38	1929–30	Sheffield Wednesday (4)	Derby County (2)	Manchester City
39	1930–31	Arsenal (1)	Aston Villa (7)	Sheffield Wednesday
40	1931–32	Everton (4)	Arsenal (2)	Sheffield Wednesday
41	1932–33	Arsenal (2)	Aston Villa (8)	Sheffield Wednesday
42	1933–34	Arsenal (3)	Huddersfield Town (3)	Tottenham Hotspur
43	1934–35	Arsenal (4)	Sunderland (5)	Sheffield Wednesday
44	1935–36	Sunderland (6)	Derby County (3)	Huddersfield Town
45	1936–37	Manchester City (1)	Charlton Athletic (1)	Arsenal
46	1937–38	Arsenal (5)	Wolverhampton Wanderers (1)	Preston North End
47	1938–39	Everton (5)	Wolverhampton Wanderers (2)	Charlton Athletic
–	1939–40 to 1945–46	League suspended due to the Second World War		
48	1946–47	Liverpool (5)	Manchester United (1)	Wolverhampton Wanderers
49	1947–48	Arsenal (6)	Manchester United (2)	Burnley
50	1948–49	Portsmouth (1)	Manchester United (3)	Derby County
51	1949–50	Portsmouth (2)	Wolverhampton Wanderers (3)	Sunderland
52	1950–51	Tottenham Hotspur (1)	Manchester United (4)	Blackpool
53	1951–52	Manchester United (3)	Tottenham Hotspur (2)	Arsenal
54	1952–53	Arsenal (7)	Preston North End (5)	Wolverhampton Wanderers
55	1953–54	Wolverhampton Wanderers (1)	West Bromwich Albion (2)	Huddersfield Town
56	1954–55	Chelsea (1)	Wolverhampton Wanderers (4)	Portsmouth
57	1955–56	Manchester United (4)	Blackpool (1)	Wolverhampton Wanderers
58	1956–57	Manchester United (5)	Tottenham Hotspur (3)	Preston North End
59	1957–58	Wolverhampton Wanderers (2)	Preston North End (6)	Tottenham Hotspur
60	1958–59	Wolverhampton Wanderers (3)	Manchester United (5)	Arsenal
61	1959–60	Burnley (2)	Wolverhampton Wanderers (5)	Tottenham Hotspur
62	1960–61	Tottenham Hotspur (2)	Sheffield Wednesday (1)	Wolverhampton Wanderers
63	1961–62	Ipswich Town (1)	Burnley (2)	Tottenham Hotspur
64	1962–63	Everton (6)	Tottenham Hotspur (4)	Burnley
65	1963–64	Liverpool (6)	Manchester United (6)	Everton
66	1964–65	Manchester United (6)	Leeds United (1)	Chelsea
67	1965–66	Liverpool (7)	Leeds United (2)	Burnley
68	1966–67	Manchester United (7)	Nottingham Forest (1)	Tottenham Hotspur
69	1967–68	Manchester City (2)	Manchester United (7)	Liverpool
70	1968–69	Leeds United (1)	Liverpool (3)	Everton
71	1969–70	Everton (7)	Leeds United (3)	Chelsea
72	1970–71	Arsenal (8)	Leeds United (4)	Tottenham Hotspur
73	1971–72	Derby County (1)	Leeds United (5)	Liverpool
74	1972–73	Liverpool (Note: Also won the UEFA Cup/UEFA Europa League.) (8)	Arsenal (3)	Leeds United
75	1973–74	Leeds United (2)	Liverpool (4)	Derby County
76	1974–75	Derby County (2)	Liverpool (5)	Ipswich Town
77	1975–76	Liverpool (9)	Queens Park Rangers (1)	Manchester United
78	1976–77	Liverpool (Note: Also won the European Cup/UEFA Champions League.) (10)	Manchester City (3)	Ipswich Town
79	1977–78	Nottingham Forest (Note: Also won the League Cup/EFL Cup.) (1)	Liverpool (6)	Everton
80	1978–79	Liverpool (11)	Nottingham Forest (2)	West Bromwich Albion
81	1979–80	Liverpool (12)	Manchester United (8)	Ipswich Town
82	1980–81	Aston Villa (7)	Ipswich Town (1)	Arsenal
83	1981–82 (Note: From the 1981–82 season onwards three points were awarded for a win. Prior to this a win was worth two points.)	Liverpool (13)	Ipswich Town (2)	Manchester United
84	1982–83	Liverpool (14)	Watford (1)	Manchester United
85	1983–84	Liverpool (15)	Southampton (1)	Nottingham Forest
86	1984–85	Everton (Note: Also won the UEFA Cup Winners' Cup.) (8)	Liverpool (7)	Tottenham Hotspur
87	1985–86	Liverpool (16)	Everton (7)	West Ham United
88	1986–87	Everton (9)	Liverpool (8)	Tottenham Hotspur
89	1987–88	Liverpool (17)	Manchester United (9)	Nottingham Forest
90	1988–89	Arsenal (9)	Liverpool (9)	Nottingham Forest
91	1989–90	Liverpool (18)	Aston Villa (9)	Tottenham Hotspur
92	1990–91	Arsenal (10)	Liverpool (10)	Crystal Palace
93	1991–92	Leeds United (3)	Manchester United (10)	Sheffield Wednesday
Premier League (1992–present)
94	1992–93	Manchester United (8)	Aston Villa (10)	Norwich City
95	1993–94	Manchester United (9)	Blackburn Rovers (1)	Newcastle United
96	1994–95	Blackburn Rovers (3)	Manchester United (11)	Nottingham Forest
97	1995–96	Manchester United (10)	Newcastle United (1)	Liverpool
98	1996–97	Manchester United (11)	Newcastle United (2)	Arsenal
99	1997–98	Arsenal (11)	Manchester United (12)	Liverpool
100	1998–99	Manchester United (Note: Manchester United won a continental treble of the Premier League, FA Cup and UEFA Champions League in 1999.) (12)	Arsenal (4)	Chelsea
101	1999–2000	Manchester United (Note: Also won the Intercontinental Cup) (13)	Arsenal (5)	Leeds United
102	2000–01	Manchester United (14)	Arsenal (6)	Liverpool
103	2001–02	Arsenal (12)	Liverpool (11)	Manchester United
104	2002–03	Manchester United (15)	Arsenal (7)	Newcastle United
105	2003–04	Arsenal (13)	Chelsea (1)	Manchester United
106	2004–05	Chelsea (2)	Arsenal (8)	Manchester United
107	2005–06	Chelsea (3)	Manchester United (13)	Liverpool
108	2006–07	Manchester United (16)	Chelsea (2)	Liverpool
109	2007–08	Manchester United (17)	Chelsea (3)	Arsenal
110	2008–09	Manchester United (Note: Also won the FIFA Club World Cup) (18)	Liverpool (12)	Chelsea
111	2009–10	Chelsea (4)	Manchester United (14)	Arsenal
112	2010–11	Manchester United (19)	Chelsea (4)	Manchester City
113	2011–12	Manchester City (3)	Manchester United (15)	Arsenal
114	2012–13	Manchester United (20)	Manchester City (4)	Chelsea
115	2013–14	Manchester City (4)	Liverpool (13)	Chelsea
116	2014–15	Chelsea (5)	Manchester City (5)	Arsenal
117	2015–16	Leicester City (1)	Arsenal (9)	Tottenham Hotspur
118	2016–17	Chelsea (6)	Tottenham Hotspur (5)	Manchester City
119	2017–18	Manchester City (5)	Manchester United (16)	Tottenham Hotspur
120	2018–19	Manchester City (Note: Manchester City won a domestic treble of the Premier League, FA Cup and EFL Cup in 2019.) (6)	Liverpool (14)	Chelsea
121	2019–20	Liverpool (19)	Manchester City (6)	Manchester United
122	2020–21	Manchester City (7)	Manchester United (17)	Liverpool
123	2021–22	Manchester City (8)	Liverpool (15)	Chelsea
124	2022–23	Manchester City (Note: Manchester City won a continental treble of the Premier League, FA Cup and UEFA Champions League in 2023.) (9)	Arsenal (10)	Manchester United
125	2023–24	Manchester City (10)	Arsenal (11)	Liverpool
126	2024–25	Liverpool (20)	Arsenal (12)	Manchester City
127	2025–26	Arsenal (14)	Manchester City (7)	Manchester United

== List of champion clubs by titles won ==
24 clubs have won the English top level title, including seven which have won the Premier League (1992–present). The most recent to join the list were Leicester City (2015–16) and before that, Nottingham Forest (1977–78) and Derby County (1971–72).

Seven teams have at some point held first or joint first place in the number of titles won: Preston North End (1889–1895), Sunderland (1893–1899, 1936–1953), Aston Villa (1897–1953), Arsenal (1948–1976), Liverpool (1966–1971, 1973–2011, 2025–present), Manchester United (1967–1971, 2009–present), and Everton (1970–1971).

Eight teams have finished as runners-up without ever finishing top: Bristol City (1906–07), Oldham Athletic (1914–15), Cardiff City (1923–24), Charlton Athletic (1936–37), Blackpool (1955–56), Queens Park Rangers (1975–76), Watford (1982–83), and Southampton (1983–84). Of these, Cardiff City came closest to winning the league, matching champions Huddersfield Town in points but losing out on goal average (goals scored divided by goals conceded), the precursor to goal difference.

Where teams in the table are tied for championship wins, they are ordered by earliest title won.

Rank	Club	Winners	Runners-up	Winning seasons
1	Liverpool	20	15	1900–01, 1905–06, 1921–22, 1922–23, 1946–47, 1963–64, 1965–66, 1972–73, 1975–76, 1976–77, 1978–79, 1979–80, 1981–82, 1982–83, 1983–84, 1985–86, 1987–88, 1989–90, 2019–20, 2024–25
1	Manchester United	20	17	1907–08, 1910–11, 1951–52, 1955–56, 1956–57, 1964–65, 1966–67, 1992–93, 1993–94, 1995–96, 1996–97, 1998–99, 1999–2000, 2000–01, 2002–03, 2006–07, 2007–08, 2008–09, 2010–11, 2012–13
3	Arsenal	14	12	1930–31, 1932–33, 1933–34, 1934–35, 1937–38, 1947–48, 1952–53, 1970–71, 1988–89, 1990–91, 1997–98, 2001–02, 2003–04, 2025–26
4	Manchester City	10	7	1936–37, 1967–68, 2011–12, 2013–14, 2017–18, 2018–19, 2020–21, 2021–22, 2022–23, 2023–24
5	Everton	9	7	1890–91, 1914–15, 1927–28, 1931–32, 1938–39, 1962–63, 1969–70, 1984–85, 1986–87
6	Aston Villa	7	10	1893–94, 1895–96, 1896–97, 1898–99, 1899–1900, 1909–10, 1980–81
7	Sunderland	6	5	1891–92, 1892–93, 1894–95, 1901–02, 1912–13, 1935–36
7	Chelsea	6	4	1954–55, 2004–05, 2005–06, 2009–10, 2014–15, 2016–17
9	Sheffield Wednesday	4	1	1902–03, 1903–04, 1928–29, 1929–30
9	Newcastle United	4	2	1904–05, 1906–07, 1908–09, 1926–27
11	Blackburn Rovers	3	1	1911–12, 1913–14, 1994–95
11	Huddersfield Town	3	3	1923–24, 1924–25, 1925–26
11	Wolverhampton Wanderers	3	5	1953–54, 1957–58, 1958–59
11	Leeds United	3	5	1968–69, 1973–74, 1991–92
15	Preston North End	2	6	1888–89, 1889–90
15	Burnley	2	2	1920–21, 1959–60
15	Portsmouth	2	0	1948–49, 1949–50
15	Tottenham Hotspur	2	5	1950–51, 1960–61
15	Derby County	2	3	1971–72, 1974–75
20	Sheffield United	1	2	1897–98
20	West Bromwich Albion	1	2	1919–20
20	Ipswich Town	1	2	1961–62
20	Nottingham Forest	1	2	1977–78
20	Leicester City	1	1	2015–16

== See also ==
- List of football clubs in England by competitive honours won
- List of English football championship-winning managers
