= East Stirlingshire F.C.–Falkirk F.C. rivalry =

Football rivalry in Scotland

East Stirlingshire vs Falkirk
- Location: Falkirk, Scotland
- Teams: East Stirlingshire and Falkirk
- First meeting: 27 August 1881; 144 years ago
- Latest meeting: 31 July 2015; Falkirk 5–0 East Stirlingshire

Statistics
- Largest victory: East Stirlingshire 9–0 Falkirk (31 March 1888); Falkirk 9–0 East Stirlingshire (7 May 1938)

The East Stirlingshire F.C.–Falkirk F.C. rivalry refers to football matches between East Stirlingshire and Falkirk football clubs, the two senior Scottish Football League teams associated with the town of Falkirk in Scotland. The derby was first contested in 1881 and the last major competitive fixture was in 2015.

East Stirlingshire was originally based in Bainsford, a small industrial village to north of Falkirk that is now a suburb of the town. The club moved south to the town centre in 1921 whilst Falkirk has been based in and around the town for its entire existence. The former home grounds of the two clubs, Brockville Park and Firs Park, were separated by less than half a mile and games between the teams sometimes attracted larger crowds than their usual average attendances. The last time the clubs competed in the same league was in 1981–82 and encounters since then have been rare; the last competitive match was in 2015 in a Scottish League Cup first round match which Falkirk won 5–0 at Broadwood Stadium.

The largest margin of victory in the fixture was when East Stirlingshire won 9–0 in the Stirlingshire Cup Final in 1888; Falkirk won by the same scoreline in a Falkirk and District Infirmary Shield semi-final match in 1938. The largest victory in a major competition was 6–0 for Falkirk in the old Second Division in 1961.

== History ==
=== Origins ===
Falkirk F.C. was founded in 1876 whilst East Stirlingshire F.C. officially formed five years later in 1881. The first match between the first teams of East Stirlingshire and Falkirk was a friendly on 27 August 1881 at Randyford Park, with Falkirk winning 5–0.

The first major competitive encounter between the two clubs came in October 1889 when they were drawn against each other in the third round of the Scottish Cup. East Stirlingshire won the match 6–1. Two players in the East Stirlingshire squad, brothers Michael and Thomas Harley, had both played for Falkirk the previous season, with Thomas scoring against his former club.

== Last five competitive meetings ==
Date	Home team	Score	Away team	Venue	Competition	Attendance	Notes
31 July 2015	Falkirk	5–0	East Stirlingshire	Broadwood Stadium	Scottish League Cup	881	
26 July 2014	East Stirlingshire	1–7	Falkirk	Ochilview Park	Scottish Challenge Cup	933	
18 August 1999	East Stirlingshire	0–2 (a.e.t.)	Falkirk	Ochilview Park (neutral)	Scottish League Cup	1,201	
20 August 1991	Falkirk	3–0	East Stirlingshire	Brockville Park	Scottish League Cup	2,590	
7 April 1982	Falkirk	0–3	East Stirlingshire	Brockville Park	First Division	1,308	

== Head-to-head record ==
=== Major competitions ===
Competition	Played	E. Stirlingshire wins	Draws	Falkirk wins	E. Stirlingshire goals	Falkirk goals
League	35	8	8	19	37	75
Scottish Cup	2	1	0	1	7	3
Scottish League Cup	3	0	0	3	0	10
Scottish Challenge Cup	1	0	0	1	1	7
Totals	41	9	8	24	45	95

Sources: soccerbase.com; statto.com; bettermeddle.org.uk

=== Minor competitions ===
Competition	Played	E. Stirlingshire wins	Draws	Falkirk wins	E. Stirlingshire goals	Falkirk goals
Midland Football League	6	2	2	2	14	16
Central Football Combination	4	4	0	0	15	5
Scottish Football Combination	2	0	1	1	4	6
Scottish Football Federation	2	0	1	1	1	2
Falkirk and District League	6	5	0	1	24	11
Scottish Qualifying Cup	7	2	2	3	11	12
Stirlingshire Cup	52	18	8	26	73	100
Penman Cup	4	1	1	2	11	18
Stirlingshire Consolation Cup	5	0	1	4	1	10
Falkirk and District Infirmary Shield	36	9	5	22	50	92
Falkirk and District Charity Cup	9	5	1	3	21	17
Totals	133	46	22	65	225	289

Sources: bettermeddle.org.uk
