= Somerset derby =

- Somerset
- Teams: Bath City; Yeovil Town; Taunton Town; Weston Super Mare
- First meeting: Yeovil Town 4–2 Bath City (23 November 1901)
- Stadiums: Huish Park (Yeovil Town); Twerton Park (Bath City); Wordsworth Drive (Taunton Town); Woodspring (Weston Super Mare)

Statistics
- Most wins: Yeovil
- Largest victory: Yeovil Town 9–0 Bath City (26 December 1946)

The Somerset derby refers to all local derby football matches between teams in Somerset, England. Most notably between Yeovil Town, Bath City, Taunton Town and Weston-super-Mare. During the 2023–24 season all four teams competed in the National League South, the sixth tier of English football. Yeovil Town are by far the most successful, being the only Somerset side to ever play in the Football League. Bath and Yeovil have played each other most out of the four clubs, playing 274 matches.

== History ==
The oldest of the four clubs, Bath City, were formed in 1889 as Bath AFC, six years later Yeovil were formed as Yeovil Casuals. The earliest Somerset derby match was recorded in 1901, when Yeovil beat Bath 4–2. From the 1910s to the late 1990s Bath and Yeovil consistently played in the Southern League against each other.

Weston Super Mare, formed in 1947, played Yeovil for the first time in 1951, in which "The Glovers" won 7–0 in the Somerset Cup. The first game the grandstand at Twerton Park opened was an FA Cup-tie in 1932. Yeovil, at the time, were said to be much “much reviled” in Bath. 5,345 watched Yeovil beat Bath 4–2. Bath City fans stated “Losing to Yeovil always hurt”. In 1947, Taunton Town were formed as Taunton FC. Neither Taunton or Weston ever reached the non-League heights of Bath or Yeovil in the Southern League or Alliance Premier League, with Taunton and Weston Super Mare playing Western League football from the 1950s to 1990s.

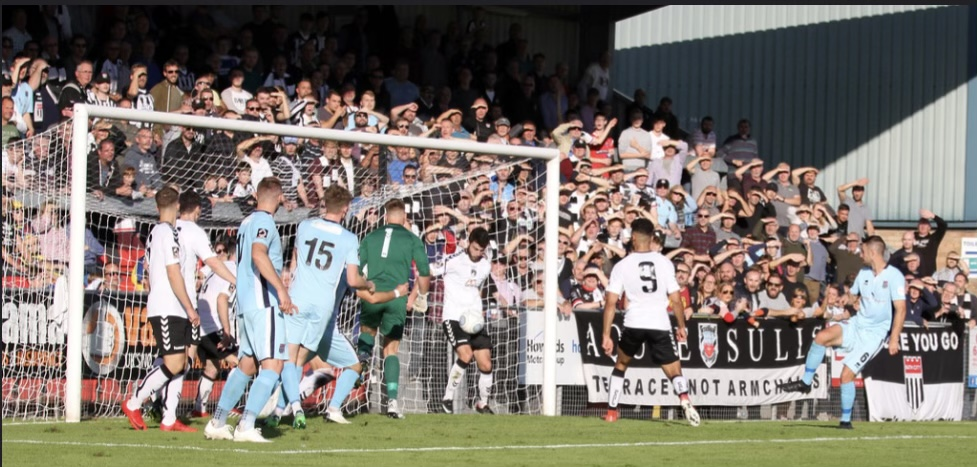
Weston Super Mare vs Bath City at The Woodsrping Stadium in 2018

However, since the turn of the century, Yeovil and Bath moved in opposite directions across the English football pyramid, with the two clubs being as many as five divisions apart from one another during the 2013–14 season. Thus, any remaining local animosity between Bath City and Yeovil Town dissipated. In the 2023–24 season Yeovil and Taunton competed in the same league for the first time, and on 26 December 2023, Yeovil played Taunton at Huish Park in front of 6,303, beating the National League South record gate at the time.

== Results ==
Bath City vs Yeovil Town results since 1984
Meeting	Season	Date	Competition	Home team	Score	Away team	Stadium	Attendance
274	2023–24	6 January 2024	National League South	Yeovil	2–0	Bath	Huish Park	5,032
273	2023–24	6 December 2023	National League South	Bath	0–1	Yeovil	Twerton Park	3,639
272	2021–22	4 May 2022	Somerset Cup	Yeovil	3–0	Bath	Huish Park	1,016
271	2006–07	1 April 2008	Somerset Cup	Yeovil	0–2	Bath	Huish Park	376
270	2002–03	29 October 2002	FA Cup	Yeovil	3–1	Bath	Huish Park	4,393
269	2002–03	27 October 2002	FA Cup	Bath	1–1	Yeovil	Twerton Park	3,470
268	2000–01	13 January 2001	FA Trophy	Yeovil	2–1	Bath	Huish Park	3,507
267	1995–96	23 January 1996	FA Trophy	Yeovil	2–3	Bath	Huish Park	2,700
266	1995–96	21 January 1996	FA Trophy	Bath	1–1	Yeovil	Twerton Park	2,225
265	1994–95	17 April 1995	Conference	Bath	3–0	Yeovil	Twerton Park	1,184
264	1994–95	6 September 1994	Conference	Yeovil	1–2	Bath	Huish Park	2,351
263	1993–94	15 March 1994	Somerset Cup	Bath	1–0	Yeovil	Twerton Park	322
262	1993–94	25 January 1994	FA Trophy	Bath	4–0	Yeovil	Twerton Park	1,148
261	1993–94	22 January 1994	FA Trophy	Yeovil	3–3	Bath	Huish Park	2,611
260	1993–94	3 January 1994	Conference	Bath	3–0	Yeovil	Twerton Park	1,518
259	1993–94	27 December 1993	Conference	Bath	0–3	Yeovil	Twerton Park	3,371
258	1993–94	2 November 1993	Conference Cup	Bath	0–1	Yeovil	Twerton Park	584
257	1992–93	12 April 1993	Conference	Bath	0–0	Yeovil	Twerton Park	1,331
256	1992–93	28 December 1993	Conference	Yeovil	2–1	Bath	Huish Park	6,488
255	1992–93	17 November 1993	Conference Cup	Yeovil	1–0	Bath	Huish Park	2,090
254	1992–93	20 October 1993	Conference Cup	Bath	0–0	Yeovil	Twerton Park	520
253	1992–93	1 January 1993	Conference	Yeovil	1–1	Bath	Huish Park	3,340
252	1992–93	26 December 1993	Conference	Bath	3–1	Yeovil	Twerton Park	1,504
251	1990–91	1 January 1991	Conference	Yeovil	3–2	Bath	Huish Park	3,335
251	1990–91	26 December 1990	Conference	Bath	2–1	Yeovil	Twerton Park	1,479
250	1987–88	4 November 1987	Somerset Cup	Yeovil	2–1	Bath	Huish Park	1,124
249	1987–88	20 October 1987	Somerset Cup	Bath	2–2	Yeovil	Twerton Park	450
248	1986–87	26 April 1987	Somerset Cup	Bath	1–2	Yeovil	Twerton Park	638
247	1986–87	15 April 1987	Somerset Cup	Bath	1–1	Yeovil	Twerton Park	577
246	1986–87	25 February 1987	Somerset Cup	Yeovil	1–1	Bath	Huish Park	1,051
245	1986–87	25 October 1986	FA Cup	Bath	2–1	Yeovil	Twerton Park	2,201
244	1985–86	29 April 1986	Somerset Cup	Yeovil	0–2	Bath	Huish Park	1,320
243	1985–86	2 April 1986	Somerset Cup	Bath	1–0	Yeovil	Twerton Park	779
242	1984–85	23 April 1985	Alliance Premier League	Bath	1–0	Yeovil	Twerton Park	808
