= Leicester City F.C.–Nottingham Forest F.C. rivalry =

Association football rivalry

Leicester City–Nottingham Forest rivalry
- Other names: East Midlands derby
- Location: Leicester/Nottingham (England)
- Teams: Leicester City; Nottingham Forest
- First meeting: 9 February 1901; FA Cup; Nottingham Forest 5–1 Leicester Fosse
- Latest meeting: 11 May 2025; Premier League; Nottingham Forest 2–2 Leicester City

Statistics
- Total meetings: 111
- Most wins: Nottingham Forest (42)
- All-time series: Leicester City: 41; Draw: 28; Nottingham Forest: 42
- Largest victory: 21 April 1909; First Division; Nottingham Forest 12–0 Leicester Fosse

The fixture between Nottingham Forest and Leicester City is a football rivalry played between the two East Midlands clubs, often referred to as an East Midlands derby. There have been a total of 111 meetings dating back to 1901 as of 11 May 2025.

Though Forest are closer in proximity to both Notts County and Derby County, and Leicester's nearest club is Coventry City, the clubs represent the two largest cities in the East Midlands.

== Notable games ==
Comparative chart of yearly league table positions of City and Forest.

One match that remains Leicester City's worst defeat and Nottingham Forest's record league win is the 12–0 result at the City Ground on 21 April 1909, when Leicester was known as Leicester Fosse. The performance by Fosse players was so appalling that The Football League ordered an inquiry, although no further action was taken after it turned out several of the already relegated Leicester side were hungover from a player's wedding the night before.

On 18 September 2007, Nottingham Forest was given a 'free goal' by Leicester City in a League Cup match at the City Ground. It was a rescheduled match after their original meeting on 28 August, which Forest were leading 1–0, was abandoned due to Leicester player Clive Clarke collapsing in the dressing room at half-time. Leicester nonetheless won the match 3–2.

To date, there have been nine hat-tricks recorded in fixtures between the two clubs, of which seven are from Nottingham Forest. Of the seven, three of those hat-tricks came from the 12–0 mauling of Leicester Fosse in 1909. Forest's most recent hat-trick against Leicester was from Robert Earnshaw in December 2009. In November 1948, Don Revie became the first Leicester player to score a hat-trick against Forest, a feat matched by Jermaine Beckford in a 4–0 FA Cup win on 17 January 2012.

A notable game between the sides in recent history happened on 4 May 2013, the final day of the 2012–13 Football League Championship season, with both sides having a chance of making the promotion play-offs with a win. Forest took an early lead through Simon Cox, but the score was 2–2 at halftime, a scoreline that remained until late into injury time when Anthony Knockaert gave Leicester a first league win at the City Ground since 1972, sending Leicester into the playoffs.

On 3 October 2022, Leicester and Forest met for the first time in the top flight of English football for 23 years, with the sides 20th and 19th respectively. Leicester won the game 4–0, but Forest won the return match 2–0 on 15 January 2023.

== Honours, head to head, and statistics ==
=== Honours ===
As of 7 August 2021

Team	League	FA Cup	League Cup	FA Charity Shield/FA Community Shield	European Cup/UEFA Champions League	European Super Cup/UEFA Super Cup	Total trophies
Leicester City	1	1	3	2	0	0	7
Nottingham Forest	1	2	4	1	2	1	11
Total	2	3	7	3	2	1	18

=== Head-to-head ===
As of 11 May 2025

The table below demonstrates the competitive match results between the two sides.

Competition	Leicester City wins	Draws	Nottingham Forest wins
League	39	26	39
FA Cup	1	1	2
League Cup	1	1	1
Total	41	28	42

== Crossing the divide ==
=== Players ===
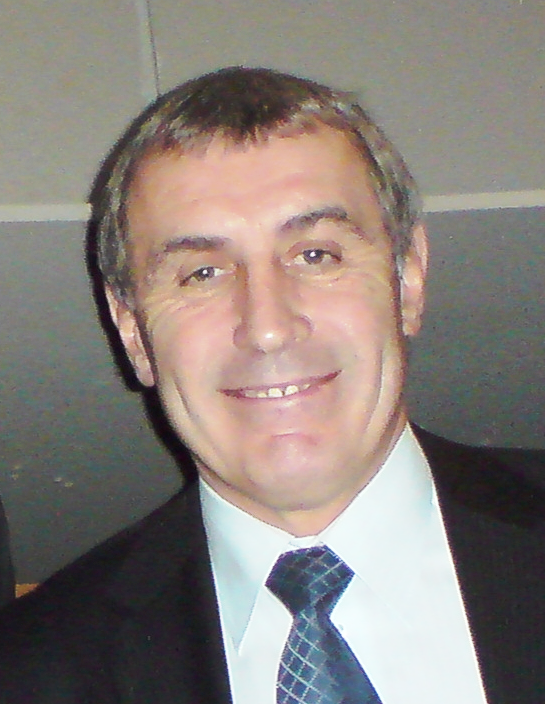
Peter Shilton established himself as one of the top goalkeepers in the country at Leicester City before enjoying European success with Nottingham Forest.

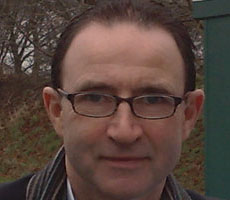
Martin O'Neill played for Forest, managed Leicester, and later managed Forest.

The list below shows transfer dates and fees, where known.

Leicester City then Nottingham Forest

- Andy Impey – May 2004, free transfer
- Yohan Benalouane – January 2019, undisclosed fee
- Ben Hamer – July 2015, loan

The following played for one or more teams before moving to Nottingham Forest:

- Matt Mills – Played for Bolton Wanderers in between
- Matty Fryatt – Played for Hull City and Sheffield Wednesday in between
- Lee Peltier – Played for Forest on loan from Leeds United
- Jack Hobbs – Played for Hull City in between
- Neil Lennon – Played for Celtic in between
- John Curtis – Played for Portsmouth in between
- Peter Shilton – Played for Stoke City in between
- Molla Wagué – Played for Udinese and Watford before joining Forest on loan in 2019
- Anthony Knockaert – Joined Forest on loan from Fulham in 2020
- Jesse Lingard – Played for five different clubs in between a loan with Leicester City and a free transfer to Nottingham Forest
- Chris Wood – Played for Leeds United, Burnley and Newcastle United in between

Nottingham Forest then Leicester City

- Wes Morgan – January 2012, £1,000,000
- Paul Konchesky – July 2011, undisclosed amount. Played for Forest on loan from Liverpool, then joined Leicester at the end of the loan spell
- Gareth Williams – July 2004, £500,000
- Riccardo Scimeca – June 2003, free transfer
- Nicky Summerbee – August 2002, free transfer
- Alan Rogers – November 2001, £300,000. Returned to Forest in 2004
- Kjetil Osvold – April 1987, loan

The following played for one or more teams before moving to Leicester City:

- Matthew Upson – Played for six different clubs in between
- Andy Johnson – Played for West Bromwich Albion in between
- Stan Collymore – Played for Liverpool and Aston Villa in between
- Phil Gilchrist – Played for Middlesbrough, Hartlepool United, and Oxford United in between
- Garry Parker – Played for Aston Villa in between, also had a spell as caretaker manager at Leicester

=== Managers ===
- Rob Kelly – Played for and managed Leicester, later caretaker manager of Forest on three separate occasions
- Billy Davies – Played briefly for Leicester, before going on to manage Nottingham Forest on two separate spells (also managed Derby County)
- Gary Megson – Played for and managed Forest, later managed Leicester
- Steve Beaglehole – Reserve team coach for Forest, briefly joint caretaker manager at Leicester
- Micky Adams – Assistant and briefly caretaker manager at Forest, later managed Leicester
- Dave Bassett – Managed Forest, and was later manager, Director of football, and caretaker manager at Leicester
- Martin O'Neill – Played for Forest, managed Leicester, later managed Forest.
- David Pleat – Played for Forest, later managed Leicester
- Matt Gillies – Leicester City's longest serving manager, later went on to manage Forest
- Steve Cooper – Took Forest back to the Premier League after a two-decade-plus absence, later managed Leicester

== Match list ==
Recent matches are on top.

Leicester City win Nottingham Forest win Draw

Date	Competition	Stadium	Score	Leicester scorers	Nottingham Forest scorers	Attendance	Ref
11 May 2025	Premier League	City Ground	2–2	Coady, Buonanotte	Gibbs-White, Wood	30,245
25 Oct 2024	Premier League	King Power Stadium	1–3	Vardy	Yates, Wood (2)	31,879
14 Jan 2023	Premier League	City Ground	2–0		Johnson (2)	29,301
3 Oct 2022	Premier League	King Power Stadium	4–0	Maddison (2), Barnes, Daka		32,202
6 Feb 2022	FA Cup	City Ground	4–1	Iheanacho	Zinckernagel, Johnson, Worrall, Spence	28,762
19 Feb 2014	Championship	City Ground	2–2	Vardy, Mahrez	Paterson, Reid	24,808
9 Nov 2013	Championship	King Power Stadium	0–2		Cox, Mackie	30,416
4 May 2013	Championship	City Ground	2–3	James, King, Knockaert	Cox, Ward	28,646
10 Nov 2012	Championship	King Power Stadium	2–2	Ward (o.g.), Nugent	Guedioura, Cox (pen.)	24,793
27 Mar 2012	Championship	King Power Stadium	0–0			23,412
17 Jan 2012	FA Cup 3rd round replay	King Power Stadium	4–0	Boateng (o.g.), Beckford (3)		16,210
7 Jan 2012	FA Cup	City Ground	0–0			18,477
20 Aug 2011	Championship	City Ground	2–2	Nugent, Fernandes	McGugan (pen.), Boateng	24,426
22 Apr 2011	Championship	City Ground	3–2	Oakley, Vassell	Tudgay, Earnshaw, McKenna	24,217
29 Nov 2010	Championship	Walkers Stadium	1–0	King		24,659
27 Feb 2010	Championship	Walkers Stadium	3–0	Berner, Gallagher, King		31,759
5 Dec 2009	Championship	City Ground	5–1	Waghorn (pen.)	Earnshaw (3), Anderson, Adebola	28,626
18 Sept 2007	League Cup 1st round	City Ground	2–3	Sheehan, Stearman, Clemence	Smith, Tyson	28,626
5 Mar 2005	Championship	Walkers Stadium	0–1		Taylor	27,277
17 Dec 2004	Championship	City Ground	1–1	Connolly	Dawson	21,415
8 Apr 2003	First Division	Walkers Stadium	1–0	Wright		32,065
26 Oct 2002	First Division	City Ground	2–2	Deane, Dickov	Johnson (pen.), Lester	29,497
16 May 1999	Premier League	City Ground	1–0		Bart-Williams	25,353
12 Dec 1998	Premier League	Filbert Street	3–1	Heskey, Elliott, Guppy	van Hooijdonk	20,891
28 Dec 1996	Premier League	Filbert Street	2–2	Heskey, Izzet	Clough, Cooper	20,833
7 Sept 1996	Premier League	City Ground	0–0			24,105
11 Mar 1995	Premier League	Filbert Street	2–4	Draper, Lowe	Collymore, Lee, Pearce, Woan	20,423
27 Aug 1994	Premier League	City Ground	1–0		Collymore	21,601
6 Feb 1994	First Division	City Ground	4–0		Gemmill (2), Glover, Woan	26,616
24 Oct 1993	First Division	Filbert Street	1–0	Speedie		17,624
14 Dec 1988	League Cup 4th round replay	City Ground	2–1	Groves	Clough, Chapman
30 Nov 1988	League Cup	Filbert Street	0–0
22 Mar 1987	First Division	City Ground	2–1		Carr, Clough
11 Oct 1986	First Division	Filbert Street	3–1	McAllister (2), Smith	Birtles
22 Mar 1986	First Division	City Ground	4–3	Smith (2), Sealy	Bowyer, Carr, Clough (2)
8 Sept 1985	First Division	Filbert Street	0–3		Webb, Davenport, Rice
27 April 1985	First Division	Filbert Street	1–0	Lineker
25 Nov 1984	First Division	City Ground	2–1	Banks	Davenport (2), (1 pen.)
5 May 1984	First Division	Filbert Street	2–1	Lynex, Lineker	Davenport
4 Dec 1983	First Division	City Ground	3–2	Jones, Smith	Bowyer, Thijssen, Walsh
28 Feb 1981	First Division	Filbert Street	1–1	Lynex	Walsh
20 Sept 1980	First Division	City Ground	5–0		Gray, Birtles (2), Robertson
14 Mar 1978	First Division	City Ground	1–0		Robertson
24 Sept 1977	First Division	Filbert Street	0–3		O'Neill, Woodcock, Robertson
22 Jan 1972	First Division	City Ground	1–2	Weller, Birchenall
18 Aug 1971	First Division	Filbert Street	2–1	Brown, O'Kane (o.g.)
1 Mar 1958	First Division	City Ground	3–1
19 Oct 1957	First Division	Filbert Street	3–1
30 Mar 1957	Second Division	City Ground	1–2	McNeill
17 Nov 1956	Second Division	Filbert Street	0–0
9 Apr 1949	Second Division	City Ground	2–1
13 Nov 1948	Second Division	Filbert Street	4–2	Revie (3)
20 Feb 1915	Second Division	City Ground	1–3
17 Oct 1914	Second Division	Filbert Street	3–1
11 Sept 1913	Second Division	Filbert Street	5–1
3 Sept 1913	Second Division	City Ground	1–3
28 Dec 1912	Second Division	City Ground	4–2
7 Sept 1912	Second Division	Filbert Street	3–1
29 Feb 1912	Second Division	Filbert Street	1–1
16 Sept 1911	Second Division	City Ground	4–1
21 Apr 1909	First Division	City Ground	12–0		Spouncer (3), Hooper (3), West (3)
7 Nov 1908	First Division	Filbert Street	0–3
20 Apr 1907	Second Division	Filbert Street	1–2
15 Dec 1906	Second Division	City Ground	2–1
9 Feb 1901	FA Cup	City Ground	5–1

== Hooliganism and crowd trouble ==
In 1977, an incident described as "trouble" broke out after a match between Leicester and Forest. Eighteen people were arrested in connection with the incident.

Incidents of throwing of objects and racist chanting from Nottingham Forest fans towards Leicester fans have also been observed in recent years. Reports of racist chanting and items being thrown at Alan Rogers during a 2–2 draw between the clubs in 2002. Most recently during an FA Cup tie in January 2012, which resulted in eleven arrests.

Following a derby clash on 4 May 2013, six Forest fans were arrested after Leicester won the game and a play-off place in the 91st minute of play.

Prior to Leicester and Forest's 2–2 draw on 19 February 2014, a Nottingham Forest fan was arrested for tweeting racist abuse at Leicester fans.

A fight broke out between both sets of supporters during a boxing event at the King Power Stadium in September 2018.

Two men were arrested after violent incidents before and after Nottingham Forest's fourth-round FA Cup tie with Leicester City in February 2002. Officers were called to disturbances in Nottingham city centre before the game began. During the FA Cup match a Leicester City fan was arrested and later charged with three counts of common assault and going onto a playing area at a football match.

On 6 February 2022 before the 2021–22 FA Cup clash between the sides, Leicester fans vandalised a bar in the city centre of Nottingham prior to kick off and a Leicester City fan ran on the pitch as Nottingham Forest players were celebrating a goal and attacked one of the Forest players.

== See also ==
- East Midlands derby
- M69 derby
- Derby – Leicester rivalry
