= Rules derby =

Football rivalry between Sheffield F.C. and Hallam F.C.

- Other names: The oldest derby The first derby
- Sport: Football
- Location: Sheffield, England
- First meeting: 26 December 1860; Hallam 0–2 Sheffield
- Latest meeting: 21 January 2025; Sheffield & Hallamshire Senior Cup; Hallam 2–1 Sheffield
- Stadiums: Home of Football Stadium (Sheffield); Sandygate (Hallam)

The Rules derby is a football derby contested between Sheffield F.C. and Hallam F.C., two historic football clubs from Sheffield, South Yorkshire, England. First played on 26 December 1860, it is widely recognised as the oldest local football derby in the world and one of the earliest recorded matches between two independent football clubs.

The fixture takes its name from the Sheffield Rules, an early code of football developed by Sheffield F.C. before the establishment of The Football Association in 1863. The rules played an important role in the development of modern association football.

The first derby was played at Hallam's Sandygate ground, which is recognised as the oldest football ground still in use. Although the clubs now compete in the lower levels of English football, the fixture continues to be played through occasional cup ties and friendly matches.

== History ==
=== Origins and first meeting (1857–1860) ===
Sheffield F.C. was founded in October 1857 by Nathaniel Creswick and William Prest, members of a local cricket club. The club is recognised as the world's oldest surviving football club. In its early years, Sheffield organised matches between its own members, including fixtures between married and unmarried players, due to the absence of other established football clubs in the area.

In 1858, Sheffield F.C. developed a written code of football laws known as the Sheffield Rules. These differed from other forms of football played in England at the time and would subsequently influence the development of the modern game.

Hallam F.C. was founded in September 1860 by members of Hallam Cricket Club, creating a second established football club in the Sheffield area. The formation of Hallam provided Sheffield with a regular local opponent and led to the organisation of the first Rules derby.

The inaugural fixture took place on Boxing Day, 26 December 1860, at Hallam's Sandygate ground in the Crosspool area of Sheffield. Played under the Sheffield Rules, the match attracted spectators despite snowy conditions. Sheffield won 2–0, establishing what would become the world's oldest surviving local football rivalry.

=== Early development and Bramall Lane (1860s–1870s) ===
The rivalry developed during a period in which Sheffield was becoming an important centre for the early organisation of football. As more clubs were established in the city, the Sheffield Rules became increasingly influential in local football competitions.

On 29 December 1862, Sheffield and Hallam contested the first football match held at Bramall Lane, which was then primarily used as a cricket ground. The match ended in a goalless draw after approximately three hours of play. Contemporary newspaper accounts described disputes between players and spectators, and the encounter subsequently became associated with the name "Battle of Bramall Lane".

The match was reported in the Sheffield Independent on 30 December 1862, providing an important contemporary account of the early rivalry. Bramall Lane would later become the home of Sheffield United F.C., which was founded in 1889.

The Sheffield Rules continued to be used by clubs in the region during the 1860s and 1870s. Although the Football Association was established in 1863, the Sheffield football authorities maintained their own code for several years before adopting the FA's laws in 1878.

=== Modern history ===
Although the Rules derby has continued since the nineteenth century, it is no longer a regular league fixture. The clubs have spent much of their recent history competing in different divisions of the English football pyramid, with meetings instead taking place through friendly matches and local cup competitions.

In July 2013, Sheffield and Hallam met in a commemorative derby at Sheffield's home ground in Dronfield, Derbyshire. Sheffield won the match 4–2, with the fixture attracting supporters from several countries and drawing attention to the clubs' shared historical significance.

The clubs continued to organise matches celebrating their place in football history. In July 2021, Hallam defeated Sheffield 2–1 in a friendly at Sandygate.

During the 2026–27 season, Hallam compete in the Northern Premier League East Division, while Sheffield compete in the United Counties League. The clubs therefore remain outside the same league competition.

=== 2025 Sheffield & Hallamshire Senior Cup ===
On 21 January 2025, the clubs met in the quarter-finals of the Sheffield & Hallamshire Senior Cup at Sandygate, marking their first competitive encounter in more than a decade. The fixture attracted a capacity crowd of 1,496 spectators.

Hallam took an early lead through James Cadman in the third minute, before Connor Cutts equalised for Sheffield six minutes later. Leon Howarth restored Hallam's advantage shortly after half-time, scoring in the 48th minute to secure a 2–1 victory for the home side.

The match received local media attention because of the clubs' historical status and the attendance at Sandygate, with a commemorative match programme produced for the occasion.

== Grounds ==
The Rules derby has historical connections with several important football grounds in the Sheffield area.

Hallam have played at Sandygate since their formation in 1860. The ground is recognised by Guinness World Records as the oldest football ground still in use and was the venue for the first Rules derby.

Sheffield currently play their home matches at the Home of Football Stadium on Sheffield Road in Dronfield, Derbyshire, outside the Sheffield city boundary.

The clubs also share a connection with Bramall Lane, where they played the ground's first football match in December 1862. The stadium subsequently became one of Sheffield's principal football venues and has been the home of Sheffield United since the club's formation in 1889.

== See also ==
- Sheffield Rules
- History of association football
- Sheffield derby
- Football in Yorkshire
