= Tommy Eggleston =

English footballer (1920–2004)

Personal information
- Full name: Thomas Eggleston
- Date of birth: 21 February 1920
- Place of birth: Consett, England
- Date of death: 14 January 2004 (aged 83)
- Place of death: Tockwith, England
- Positions: Left half; full-back

Youth career
- –1936: Medomsley Juniors

Senior career*
Years	Team	Apps	(Gls)
1936–1946	Derby County	0	(0)
1946–1948	Leicester City	34	(2)
1948–1953	Watford	177	(6)
Total		211	(8)

Managerial career
- 1967–1970: Mansfield Town
- 1970–1971: Ethnikos Piraeus
- 1971: Panachaiki
- 1973: Everton (caretaker)
- 1973–1974: Home Farm
- * Club domestic league appearances and goals

Thomas Eggleston (21 February 1920 – 14 January 2004) was an English footballer and manager.

== Career ==
Eggleston became a coach and manager after a playing career interrupted by the Second World War and then ended prematurely by injury. He was also a qualified chiropodist.

His first club was Derby County, whom he joined in 1936 and 10 years later he played a part in helping the Rams to their first, and so far only, FA Cup success.

Although wing-half Eggleston was involved in the earlier rounds, he did not play in the final itself, a 4–1 extra-time victory over Charlton Athletic. That same year he moved on to Leicester and in February 1948 was transferred to Watford, for whom he went on to make 186 appearances and score six goals. After leaving the club, he became a trainer at Brentford.

When his playing career ended Eggleston turned to coaching and was with Sheffield Wednesday before joining ex-Hillsborough boss Harry Catterick at Everton, as well as a brief spell under the management of Neil McBain at Watford.

He formed a close working relationship with Catterick and the pair's combined efforts helped Everton to the League Championship in 1963 and the FA Cup three years later.

Catterick collapsed and died after the FA Cup quarter-final at between Everton and Ipswich at Goodison Park in March 1985, when Eggleston was present. Eggleston was appointed manager of Mansfield Town in July 1967

After three years with the Stags he was tempted by a £10,000-a-week offer to take charge of Greek club Ethnikos Asteras.

Upon his return to England he rejoined Everton.

In December 1973 he was appointed manager of Home Farm. This was a sort of homecoming for the Eggleston as his wife Frances was from Rathmines. However, after only three months he left the League of Ireland and then turned to physiotherapy. He was with Plymouth Argyle for two and a half years before replacing Brian Simpson at Ipswich Town.

In his first season, he was back at Wembley as Town triumphed in the FA Cup final, Eggleston tending to goalkeeper Roger Osborne as he was overcome with emotion and exhaustion.

== Managerial statistics ==
Team	Nat	From	To	Record				
Team	Nat	From	To	G	W	L	D	Win %
Mansfield Town	(England)	1 July 1967	1 July 1970	138	49	54	45	35.50
Everton	(England)	12 April 1973	28 May 1973	5	1	2	2	35.50
