= Derby County F.C.–Leicester City F.C. rivalry =

Association football rivalry

Derby County–Leicester City rivalry
- Other names: East Midlands derby
- Location: Derby; Leicester (England)
- Teams: Derby County; Leicester City
- First meeting: 10 February 1894
- Latest meeting: Leicester City 2–1 Derby County; EFL Championship (29 December 2025)
- Next meeting: TBD

Statistics
- Total meetings: 110
- Most wins: Derby County (46)
- All-time series: County Derby: 46; Draw: 28; Leicester City: 36
- Largest victory: Leicester Fosse 6–0 Derby County; 1909–10 Second Division (26 February 1910); Leicester Fosse 0–6 Derby County; 1914–15 Second Division (28 December 1914)

The fixture between Leicester City and Derby County is a football rivalry in the East Midlands. The fixture is often called an East Midlands derby. The two clubs have a strong mutual dislike of each other, and the rivalry is keenly felt on the border between both cities and counties. However, Derby supporters generally consider Nottingham Forest to be their main rivals, while Leicester supporters generally consider both Nottingham Forest and Coventry City to be their main rivals.

Historically, in a total of 110 matches between the two sides, there have been 28 draws. Derby have a better overall record against Leicester, winning 46 times, whereas Leicester have won 36 times. However, in recent years, Leicester have dominated the fixture, having won 11 of the last 13 meetings, losing just one.

== Head to head ==
The table below demonstrates the competitive match results between the two sides.

Competition	Leicester City wins	Draws	Derby County wins
Football League	30	26	35
Premier League	4	0	8
FA Cup	1	1	1
League Cup	1	1	2
Total	36	28	46

== Crossing the divide ==
During both Derby and Leicester's history several players have played for both clubs and a manager has managed both.

=== Players ===
Derby then Leicester

- Johnny McMillan
- Jack Bowers
- Tommy Eggleston
- David McCulloch
- Johnny Morris
- Willie Carlin
- Gerry Daly
- Dave Langan
- Gary Mills, also played for Nottingham Forest and Notts County
- Bobby Davison
- Ian Ormondroyd
- Phil Gee
- Gary Rowett
- Dean Sturridge
- Jacob Laursen
- Lee Morris
- Steve Howard
- Matt Oakley
- Chris Powell
- Marc Edworthy
- James Vaughan

Leicester then Derby

- Mick O'Brien
- John Summers
- David Nish
- David Webb
- Trevor Christie, also played for Nottingham Forest and Notts County.
- Mark Wallington
- Mark Grew
- Peter Shilton, also played for Nottingham Forest.
- Ian Wilson
- Paul Kitson
- Gary Charles also played for Nottingham Forest.
- Russell Hoult
- Ashley Ward
- Spencer Prior
- Chris Makin
- Kevin Poole
- Ryan Smith
- Robbie Savage – played for Birmingham City and Blackburn Rovers in between.
- Paul Dickov – loaned to Derby County from Leicester in 2009.
- Jordan Stewart
- Lee Hendrie
- DJ Campbell
- David Martin
- Zak Whitbread
- Michael Keane – loaned to Leicester City, and later Derby County, from Manchester United
- Jesse Lingard – loaned to Leicester City, and later Derby County, from Manchester United
- David Nugent
- Martyn Waghorn – played for Rangers, Wigan Athletic and Ipswich Town in between.
- Tom Lawrence
- Andy King – loaned to Derby County from Leicester in January 2019.
- Richard Stearman

=== Managers and staff ===
- Nigel Pearson – managed Leicester in 2 separate spells, left Derby by mutual consent on 8 October 2016
- Kevin Phillips – Player and coach at Leicester, later first team coach at Derby

== Results since 2006 ==
Derby County win Leicester City win Draw

Date	Competition	Stadium	Score	Derby scorers	Leicester scorers	Attendance	Ref
Leicester relegated to League One 2025–26
29 December 2025	Championship	King Power Stadium	2–1	Rhian Brewster	Bobby De Cordova-Reid, Jordan James	31,354
6 December 2025	Championship	Pride Park Stadium	1–3	Sondre Langås	Bobby De Cordova-Reid, Oliver Skipp, Jordan James	30,784
Leicester relegated to Championship 2024–25
Leicester promoted to Premier League 2023–24
Derby promoted to Championship 2023–24
Leicester relegated to Championship 2022–23
Derby relegated to League One 2021–22
8 February 2017	FA Cup	King Power Stadium	3–1 (a.e.t.)	Abdoul Camara	Andy King, Wilfred Ndidi, Demarai Gray	31,648
27 January 2017	FA Cup	Pride Park Stadium	2–2	Darren Bent, Craig Bryson	Darren Bent (o.g.), Wes Morgan	25,079
Leicester promoted to Premier League 2013–14
10 January 2014	Championship	King Power Stadium	4–1	Ritchie De Laet (o.g.)	Ritchie De Laet, David Nugent (2), Jamie Vardy	23,140
24 September 2013	League Cup	King Power Stadium	2–1	Chris Martin	Anthony Knockaert, Danny Drinkwater	14,043
17 August 2013	Championship	Pride Park Stadium	0–1		Lee Grant (o.g.)	23,437
16 March 2013	Championship	Pride Park Stadium	2–1	Richard Keogh, Chris Martin	Jeff Schlupp	23,123
1 December 2012	Championship	King Power Stadium	4–1	Theo Robinson	Zak Whitbread, Martyn Waghorn, David Nugent (2)	20,806
23 February 2012	Championship	Pride Park Stadium	0–1		Neil Danns	28,205
1 October 2011	Championship	King Power Stadium	4–0		David Nugent, Darius Vassell, Jeff Schlupp, Lloyd Dyer	22,496
12 February 2011	Championship	Pride Park Stadium	0–2		Yakubu, Andy King	26,142
13 November 2010	Championship	Walkers Stadium	2–0		Andy King, Steve Howard (pen.)	25,930
27 March 2010	Championship	Pride Park Stadium	1–0	Andy King (o.g.)		30,259
17 October 2009	Championship	Walkers Stadium	0–0			28,875
Leicester promoted to Championship 2008–09
Leicester relegated to League One 2007–08
Derby relegated to Championship 2007–08
Derby promoted to Premier League 2006–07
6 April 2007	Championship	Walkers Stadium	1–1	Craig Fagan	Matty Fryatt	24,704
25 November 2006	Championship	Pride Park Stadium	1–0	Jon Stead		28,315
14 February 2006	Championship	Walkers Stadium	2–2	Mounir El Hamdaoui, Richard Stearman (o.g.)	Iain Hume, Alan Maybury	23,246

== Notable results ==
First Division play-off final
30 May 1994
13:30 BST

Leicester City	2–1	Derby County
Walsh 41', 84'		Johnson 28'

Wembley Stadium, London
Attendance: 73,671
Referee: Roger Milford

28 December 1915

Leicester Fosse	0–6	Derby County

Filbert Street, Leicester
Referee: Unknown

26 February 1910

Leicester Fosse	6–0	Derby County

Filbert Street, Leicester
Referee: Unknown

10 February 1894

Leicester Fosse	0–0	Derby County

Filbert Street, Leicester
Referee: Unknown

== Honours ==
Team	League	FA Cup	League Cup	FA Charity Shield/ FA Community Shield	Total trophies
Leicester City	1	1	3	2	7
Derby County	2	1	0	1	4
Total	3	2	3	3	12

== Hooliganism ==
The fixture between the two teams, like the majority of local derbies in English football, has resulted in a number of football hooliganism related incidents.

In 1985, after a League Cup match between the two sides which saw Leicester eliminated at the hands of Derby, there was a widespread "riot".

In 2009, James Underwood, a Derby supporter aligned with the firm Derby Lunatic Fringe, was involved in an incident with Leicester supporters. In 2010, Underwood was then banned from attending football matches for three years for his role in that incident, among other separate clashes involving supporters of Everton, Nottingham Forest and Sheffield Wednesday.

== Miscellaneous ==
- The highest scoring game between the two sides ended 5–2 to Derby County in the 1928/29 season, in which year Leicester achieved their second highest ever league finish.
- The last fixture played away from both clubs' home stadiums was in 1994, in the play-off final at the old Wembley Stadium. Leicester won the match 2–1 to gain promotion to the Premier League.
- The last time Derby have won against Leicester away from home was in 2002 at Filbert Street, the year both clubs were relegated from the Premier League. Leicester won the reverse fixture 3–2.
- According to the Football fan census, Leicester and Derby are 'traditional' rivals.
- Leicester as well as Forest refer to Derby as 'the sheep', a reference to their nickname being the Rams.
- Of the two clubs, Leicester have a better record against Nottingham Forest.

== See also ==
- Leicester City F.C.–Nottingham Forest F.C. rivalry
- M69 derby
