= 1986–87 Football League =

88th season of the Football League

The Football League
- Season: 1986–87
- Champions: Everton
- Relegated: Lincoln City

The 1986–87 season was the 88th completed season of The Football League.

Play-offs to determine promotion places were introduced in 1987 so that more clubs remained eligible for promotion closer to the end of the season, and at the same time to aid in the reduction over two years of the number of clubs in the First Division from 22 to 20.

At the same time, automatic promotion and relegation between the Fourth Division and the Football Conference was introduced for one club, replacing the annual application for re-election to the League of the bottom four clubs and linking the League to the developing National League System pyramid.

== Final league tables and results ==
The tables and results below are reproduced here in the exact form that they can be found at The Rec.Sport.Soccer Statistics Foundation website.

As of this season, there were no more re-election procedures, but instead, the club finishing last in the Fourth Division was demoted to Conference. The first casualty of this new practice were Lincoln City.

== First Division ==
First Division
- Season: 1986–87
- Champions: Everton; 9th English title
- Relegated: Leicester City; Manchester City; Aston Villa
- Matches: 462
- Goals: 1,215 (2.63 per match)
- Top goalscorer: Clive Allen (33 goals)
- Biggest home win: Nottingham Forest 6–0 Aston Villa (20 September 1986); Sheffield Wednesday 7–1 Queens Park Rangers (2 May 1987)
- Biggest away win: Chelsea 2–6 Nottingham Forest (20 September 1986); Southampton 0–4 Arsenal (15 November 1986); Aston Villa 0–4 Arsenal (29 November 1986); Chelsea 0–4 Wimbledon (6 December 1986); Newcastle United 0–4 Everton (26 December 1986)
- Highest scoring: Chelsea 2–6 Nottingham Forest (20 September 1986); West Ham United 5–3 Chelsea (11 October 1986); Liverpool 6–2 Norwich City (1 November 1986); Sheffield Wednesday 7–1 Queens Park Rangers (2 May 1987)
- Longest winning run: 7 matches Everton
- Longest unbeaten run: 17 matches Arsenal
- Longest losing run: 6 matches Newcastle United

The First Division championship went to Everton in their final season under the management of Howard Kendall before his departure to Athletic Bilbao. This remains Everton's last league title. His side overcame a spate of injuries to fight off competition from runners-up Liverpool and third-placed Tottenham Hotspur. Fourth place went to George Graham's emerging young Arsenal side who also won the League Cup in his first season in charge. Fifth place went to newly-promoted Norwich City, whose manager Ken Brown built a strong squad on a limited budget to achieve a finish which would have been enough to qualify for the UEFA Cup had it not been for the ongoing ban on English clubs in European competitions.

Wimbledon finished sixth in the First Division in only their tenth season as a Football League club. Dave Bassett's men had led the league for the first two weeks of September, but sixth place was still much higher than most pundits had predicted at the start of the season. Luton Town enjoyed their highest league position by finishing seventh.

Manchester United manager Ron Atkinson had been under pressure for months, after his side had finished fourth in the league in 1985–86, 12 points behind the champions, Liverpool. The Manchester United board had initially decided to stick with Atkinson as manager for the 1986–87 season, but finally sacked him in November with Manchester United fourth from bottom in the league and having suffered a League Cup exit to Southampton. Aberdeen manager Alex Ferguson took over, and results began to improve despite no immediate new signings being made, with Manchester United finally finishing 11th.

West Ham United, who had come close to winning the title the previous season, slipped to 15th place in 1986–87.

Aston Villa were relegated to the Second Division just five years after they won the European Cup. Chairman Doug Ellis had sensed from the start that 1986-87 would be a tough season for the club, so he axed manager Graham Turner in September and replaced him with Manchester City's Billy McNeill. But McNeill was unable to stop the rot and Villa went down in bottom place. McNeill was subsequently sacked and replaced by Watford's Graham Taylor.

Villa were joined on the way down by Manchester City and Leicester City. In the first season of the relegation/promotion play-offs, Charlton Athletic beat Second Division Leeds United to retain their top flight status.

No European qualification took place due to UEFA voting to ban English clubs from European competitions for a third season following the Heysel disaster in 1985.

=== Final table ===
Pos	Team	Pld	W	D	L	GF	GA	GD	Pts	Qualification or relegation
1	Everton (C)	42	26	8	8	76	31	+45	86	Disqualified from the European Cup
2	Liverpool	42	23	8	11	72	42	+30	77	Disqualified from the UEFA Cup
3	Tottenham Hotspur	42	21	8	13	68	43	+25	71	Disqualified from the UEFA Cup
4	Arsenal (Note: Arsenal would have qualified as League Cup winners.)	42	20	10	12	58	35	+23	70	Disqualified from the UEFA Cup
5	Norwich City	42	17	17	8	53	51	+2	68	
6	Wimbledon	42	19	9	14	57	50	+7	66	
7	Luton Town	42	18	12	12	47	45	+2	66	
8	Nottingham Forest	42	18	11	13	64	51	+13	65	
9	Watford	42	18	9	15	67	54	+13	63	
10	Coventry City (Note: Coventry City would have qualified as FA Cup winners.)	42	17	12	13	50	45	+5	63	Disqualified from the European Cup Winners' Cup
11	Manchester United	42	14	14	14	52	45	+7	56	
12	Southampton	42	14	10	18	69	68	+1	52	
13	Sheffield Wednesday	42	13	13	16	58	59	−1	52	
14	Chelsea	42	13	13	16	53	64	−11	52	
15	West Ham United	42	14	10	18	52	67	−15	52	
16	Queens Park Rangers	42	13	11	18	48	64	−16	50	
17	Newcastle United	42	12	11	19	47	65	−18	47	
18	Oxford United	42	11	13	18	44	69	−25	46	
19	Charlton Athletic (O)	42	11	11	20	45	55	−10	44	Qualification for the Second Division play-offs
20	Leicester City (R)	42	11	9	22	54	76	−22	42	Relegation to the Second Division
21	Manchester City (R)	42	8	15	19	36	57	−21	39	Relegation to the Second Division
22	Aston Villa (R)	42	8	12	22	45	79	−34	36	Relegation to the Second Division

Source: World Football
Rules for classification: 1) Points; 2) Goal difference; 3) Goals scored
(C) Champions; (O) Play-off winners; (R) Relegated

== Results ==
Home \ Away	ARS	AST	CHA	CHE	COV	EVE	LEI	LIV	LUT	MCI	MUN	NEW	NWC	NOT	OXF	QPR	SHW	SOU	TOT	WAT	WHU	WDN
Arsenal		2–1	2–1	3–1	0–0	0–1	4–1	0–1	3–0	3–0	1–0	0–1	1–2	0–0	0–0	3–1	2–0	1–0	0–0	3–1	0–0	3–1
Aston Villa	0–4		2–0	0–0	1–0	0–1	2–0	2–2	2–1	0–0	3–3	2–0	1–4	0–0	1–2	0–1	1–2	3–1	0–3	1–1	4–0	0–0
Charlton Athletic	0–2	3–0		0–0	1–1	3–2	2–0	0–0	0–1	5–0	0–0	1–1	1–2	0–1	0–0	2–1	1–1	1–3	0–2	4–3	2–1	0–1
Chelsea	1–0	4–1	0–1		0–0	1–2	3–1	3–3	1–3	2–1	1–1	1–3	0–0	2–6	4–0	3–1	2–0	1–1	0–2	0–0	1–0	0–4
Coventry City	2–1	0–1	2–1	3–0		1–1	1–0	1–0	0–1	2–2	1–1	3–0	2–1	1–0	3–0	4–1	1–0	1–1	4–3	1–0	1–3	1–0
Everton	0–1	3–0	2–1	2–2	3–1		5–1	0–0	3–1	0–0	3–1	3–0	4–0	2–0	3–1	0–0	2–0	3–0	1–0	3–2	4–0	3–0
Leicester City	1–1	1–1	1–0	2–2	1–1	0–2		2–1	1–1	4–0	1–1	1–1	0–2	3–1	2–0	4–1	6–1	2–3	1–2	1–2	2–0	3–1
Liverpool	2–1	3–3	2–0	3–0	2–0	3–1	4–3		2–0	0–0	0–1	2–0	6–2	3–0	4–0	2–1	1–1	1–0	0–1	1–0	1–0	1–2
Luton Town	0–0	2–1	1–0	1–0	2–0	1–0	1–0	4–1		1–0	2–1	0–0	0–0	4–2	2–3	1–0	0–0	2–1	3–1	0–2	2–1	0–0
Manchester City	3–0	3–1	2–1	1–2	0–1	1–3	1–2	0–1	1–1		1–1	0–0	2–2	1–0	1–0	0–0	1–0	2–4	1–1	1–2	3–1	3–1
Manchester United	2–0	3–1	0–1	0–1	1–1	0–0	2–0	1–0	1–0	2–0		4–1	0–1	2–0	3–2	1–0	3–1	5–1	3–3	3–1	2–3	0–1
Newcastle United	1–2	2–1	0–3	1–0	1–2	0–4	2–0	0–2	2–2	3–1	2–1		4–1	3–2	0–0	0–2	2–3	2–0	1–1	2–2	4–0	1–0
Norwich City	1–1	1–1	1–1	2–2	1–1	0–1	2–1	2–1	0–0	1–1	0–0	2–0		2–1	2–1	1–0	1–0	4–3	2–1	1–3	1–1	0–0
Nottingham Forest	1–0	6–0	4–0	0–1	0–0	1–0	2–1	1–1	2–2	2–0	1–1	2–1	1–1		2–0	1–0	3–2	0–0	2–0	1–1	1–1	3–2
Oxford United	0–0	2–2	3–2	1–1	2–0	1–1	0–0	1–3	4–2	0–0	2–0	1–1	0–1	2–1		0–1	2–1	3–1	2–4	1–3	0–0	3–1
Queens Park Rangers	1–4	1–0	0–0	1–1	3–1	0–1	0–1	1–3	2–2	1–0	1–1	2–1	1–1	3–1	1–1		2–2	2–1	2–0	3–2	2–3	2–1
Sheffield Wednesday	1–1	2–1	1–1	2–0	2–2	2–2	2–2	0–1	1–0	2–1	1–0	2–0	1–1	2–3	6–1	7–1		3–1	0–1	0–1	2–2	0–2
Southampton	0–4	5–0	2–2	1–2	2–0	0–2	4–0	2–1	3–0	1–1	1–1	4–1	1–2	1–3	3–0	5–1	1–1		2–0	3–1	1–0	2–2
Tottenham Hotspur	1–2	3–0	1–0	1–3	1–0	2–0	5–0	1–0	0–0	1–0	4–0	1–1	3–0	2–3	3–1	1–0	1–1	2–0		2–1	4–0	1–2
Watford	2–0	4–2	4–1	3–1	2–3	2–1	5–1	2–0	2–0	1–1	1–0	1–0	1–1	1–1	3–0	0–3	0–1	1–1	1–0		2–2	0–1
West Ham United	3–1	1–1	1–3	5–3	1–0	1–0	4–1	2–5	2–0	2–0	0–0	1–1	0–2	1–2	0–1	1–1	0–2	3–1	2–1	1–0		2–3
Wimbledon	1–2	3–2	2–0	2–1	2–1	1–2	1–0	1–3	0–1	0–0	1–0	3–1	2–0	2–1	1–1	1–1	3–0	2–2	2–2	2–1	0–1	

Legend: Blue = home team win; Yellow = draw; Red = away team win.

=== Managerial changes ===
Team	Outgoing manager	Manner of departure	Date of vacancy	Position in table	Incoming manager	Date of appointment
Arsenal	(England) Steve Burtenshaw	End of caretaker spell	14 May 1986	Pre-season	(Scotland) George Graham	14 May 1986
Tottenham Hotspur	(Wales) Peter Shreeves	Sacked	15 May 1986	Pre-season	(England) David Pleat	16 May 1986
Luton Town	(England) David Pleat	Signed by Tottenham Hotspur	16 May 1986	Pre-season	(Scotland) John Moore	16 May 1986
Leicester City	(England) Gordon Milne	Became general manager	3 June 1986	Pre-season	(Northern Ireland) Bryan Hamilton	3 June 1986
Aston Villa	(England) Graham Turner	Sacked	16 September 1986	21st	(Scotland) Billy McNeill	22 September 1986
Manchester City	(Scotland) Billy McNeill	Signed by Aston Villa	22 September 1986	15th	(Scotland) Jimmy Frizzell	22 September 1986
Manchester United	(England) Ron Atkinson	Sacked	6 November 1986	19th	(Scotland) Alex Ferguson	7 November 1986
Aston Villa	(Scotland) Billy McNeill	Sacked	6 May 1987	22nd	(Scotland) Ron Wylie (caretaker)	6 May 1987

=== First Division maps ===
Locations of the Football League First Division London teams 1986–1987
Locations of the Football League First Division 1986–1987 teams

== Second Division ==
Second Division
- Season: 1986–87
- Champions: Derby County
- Promoted: Derby County; Portsmouth
- Relegated: Sunderland; Grimsby Town; Brighton & Hove Albion
- Matches: 462
- Goals: 1,131 (2.45 per match)
- Top goalscorer: Micky Quinn (22 goals)

There were just two guaranteed promotion places in the Second Division this season due to the introduction of the playoffs and the phased reorganization of the league. Derby County finished top of the Second Division to clinch a second successive promotion and reclaim the First Division place they had last held in 1980. Portsmouth, absent from the First Division for nearly 30 years and who had missed promotion by a single place in the previous two seasons, finally achieved promotion by finishing second. Oldham Athletic and Ipswich Town failed to progress beyond the semi-finals of the new playoffs, leaving Leeds United to take on Charlton Athletic in a two-legged contest for a First Division place. Charlton won the replay to keep their First Division status and condemn Leeds to a sixth successive season in the Second Division.

Financially troubled Grimsby Town were relegated, along with Brighton & Hove Albion. Sunderland's second relegation in three seasons condemned them to Third Division football for the first time in their history as they went down after losing in the playoffs.

Pos	Team	Pld	W	D	L	GF	GA	GD	Pts	Qualification or relegation
1	Derby County (C, P)	42	25	9	8	64	38	+26	84	Promotion to the First Division
2	Portsmouth (P)	42	23	9	10	53	28	+25	78	Promotion to the First Division
3	Oldham Athletic	42	22	9	11	65	44	+21	75	Qualification for the Second Division play-offs
4	Leeds United	42	19	11	12	58	44	+14	68	Qualification for the Second Division play-offs
5	Ipswich Town	42	17	13	12	59	43	+16	64	Qualification for the Second Division play-offs
6	Crystal Palace	42	19	5	18	51	53	−2	62	
7	Plymouth Argyle	42	16	13	13	62	57	+5	61	
8	Stoke City	42	16	10	16	63	53	+10	58	
9	Sheffield United	42	15	13	14	50	49	+1	58	
10	Bradford City	42	15	10	17	62	62	0	55	
11	Barnsley	42	14	13	15	49	52	−3	55	
12	Blackburn Rovers	42	15	10	17	45	55	−10	55	
13	Reading	42	14	11	17	52	59	−7	53	
14	Hull City	42	13	14	15	41	55	−14	53	
15	West Bromwich Albion	42	13	12	17	51	49	+2	51	
16	Millwall	42	14	9	19	39	45	−6	51	
17	Huddersfield Town	42	13	12	17	54	61	−7	51	
18	Shrewsbury Town	42	15	6	21	41	53	−12	51	
19	Birmingham City	42	11	17	14	47	59	−12	50	
20	Sunderland (R)	42	12	12	18	49	59	−10	48	Qualification for the Third Division play-offs
21	Grimsby Town (R)	42	10	14	18	39	59	−20	44	Relegation to the Third Division
22	Brighton & Hove Albion (R)	42	9	12	21	37	54	−17	39	Relegation to the Third Division

Rules for classification: 1) Points; 2) Goal difference; 3) Goals scored
(C) Champions; (P) Promoted; (R) Relegated

=== Second Division play-offs ===
Semi-finals; 1st leg –14 May; 2nd leg –17 May 1987
19th	Charlton Athletic (Div 1)	0	2	2
5th	Ipswich Town	0	1	1
3rd	Oldham Athletic	0	2	2
4th	Leeds United (Note: Leeds United won on away goals.)	1	1	2

Finals; 1st leg –23 May; 2nd leg –25 May 1987
19th	Charlton Athletic (Div 1)	1	0	1
4th	Leeds United	0	1	1

Replay

29 May 1987

Leeds United	1–2 (a.e.t.)	Charlton Athletic (Div 1)
	Report/Soccerbase

St. Andrew's, Birmingham
Attendance: 18,000
- Charlton Athletic remained in the First Division and Leeds United in the Second Division.

=== Second Division results ===
Home \ Away	BAR	BIR	BLB	BRA	B&HA	CRY	DER	GRI	HUD	HUL	IPS	LEE	MIL	OLD	PLY	POR	REA	SHU	SHR	STK	SUN	WBA
Barnsley		2–2	1–1	2–0	3–1	2–3	0–1	1–0	0–1	1–1	2–1	0–1	1–0	1–1	1–1	0–2	2–0	2–2	2–1	0–2	1–0	2–2
Birmingham City	1–1		1–1	2–1	2–0	4–1	1–1	1–0	1–1	0–0	2–2	2–1	1–1	1–3	3–2	0–1	1–1	2–1	0–2	0–0	2–0	0–1
Blackburn Rovers	4–2	1–0		2–1	1–1	0–2	3–1	2–2	1–2	0–2	0–0	2–1	1–0	1–0	1–2	1–0	0–0	0–2	2–1	2–1	6–1	0–1
Bradford City	0–0	0–0	2–0		2–0	1–2	0–1	4–2	4–3	2–0	3–4	2–0	4–0	0–3	2–2	1–0	3–0	1–1	0–0	1–4	3–2	1–3
Brighton & Hove Albion	1–1	2–0	0–2	2–2		2–0	0–1	0–1	1–1	2–1	1–2	0–1	0–1	1–2	1–1	0–0	1–1	2–0	3–0	1–0	0–3	2–0
Crystal Palace	0–1	6–0	2–0	1–1	2–0		1–0	0–3	1–0	5–1	3–3	1–0	2–1	2–1	0–0	1–0	1–3	1–2	2–3	1–0	2–0	1–1
Derby County	3–2	2–2	3–2	1–0	4–1	1–0		4–0	2–0	1–1	2–1	2–1	1–1	0–1	4–2	0–0	3–0	2–0	3–1	0–0	3–2	1–1
Grimsby Town	0–1	0–1	1–0	0–0	1–2	0–1	0–1		0–1	2–2	1–1	0–0	1–0	2–2	1–1	0–2	3–2	1–0	0–1	1–1	1–1	3–1
Huddersfield Town	2–2	2–2	1–2	5–2	2–1	1–2	2–0	0–0		1–3	1–2	1–1	3–0	5–4	1–2	2–0	2–0	1–1	2–1	2–2	0–2	2–1
Hull City	3–4	3–2	0–0	2–1	1–0	3–0	1–1	1–1	0–0		2–1	0–0	2–1	1–0	0–3	0–2	0–2	0–0	3–0	0–4	1–0	2–0
Ipswich Town	1–0	3–0	3–1	1–0	1–0	3–0	0–2	1–1	3–0	0–0		2–0	0–0	0–1	3–0	0–1	1–1	2–2	1–0	2–0	1–1	1–0
Leeds United	2–2	4–0	0–0	1–0	3–1	3–0	2–0	2–0	1–1	3–0	3–2		2–0	0–2	4–0	3–1	3–2	0–1	1–0	2–1	1–1	3–2
Millwall	1–0	0–2	2–2	1–2	3–1	0–1	0–1	1–0	4–0	0–1	1–0	1–0		0–0	3–1	1–1	2–1	1–0	4–0	1–1	1–1	0–1
Oldham Athletic	2–0	2–2	3–0	2–1	1–1	1–0	1–4	1–1	2–0	0–0	2–1	0–1	2–1		2–1	0–0	4–0	3–1	3–0	2–0	1–1	2–1
Plymouth Argyle	2–0	0–0	1–1	3–2	2–2	3–1	1–1	5–0	1–1	4–0	2–0	1–1	1–0	3–2		2–3	1–0	1–0	3–2	1–3	2–4	1–0
Portsmouth	2–1	2–0	1–0	2–1	1–0	2–0	3–1	2–1	1–0	1–0	1–1	1–1	2–0	3–0	0–1		1–0	1–2	3–0	3–0	3–1	2–1
Reading	0–0	2–2	4–0	0–1	2–1	1–0	2–0	2–3	3–2	1–0	1–4	2–1	0–1	2–3	2–0	2–2		2–0	3–1	0–1	1–0	1–1
Sheffield United	1–0	1–1	4–1	2–2	0–1	1–0	0–1	1–2	0–0	4–2	0–0	0–0	2–1	2–0	2–1	1–0	3–3		1–1	3–1	2–1	1–1
Shrewsbury Town	1–0	1–0	0–1	0–1	1–0	0–0	0–1	4–1	1–2	3–0	2–1	0–2	1–2	2–0	1–1	1–0	0–0	1–0		4–1	0–1	1–0
Stoke City	1–2	0–2	1–0	2–3	1–1	3–1	0–2	5–1	2–0	1–1	0–0	7–2	2–0	0–2	1–0	1–1	3–0	5–2	1–0		3–0	1–1
Sunderland	2–3	2–0	3–0	2–3	1–1	1–0	1–2	0–1	2–1	1–0	1–0	1–1	1–1	0–2	2–1	0–0	1–1	1–2	1–1	2–0		0–3
West Bromwich Albion	0–1	3–2	0–1	2–2	0–0	1–2	2–0	1–1	1–0	1–1	3–4	3–0	0–1	2–0	0–0	1–0	1–2	1–0	1–2	4–1	2–2	

Legend: Blue = home team win; Yellow = draw; Red = away team win.

=== Second Division maps ===
Locations of the Football League Second Division London teams 1986–1987
Locations of the Football League Second Division 1986–1987 teams

== Third Division ==
The three promotion places in this division were gained by three clubs who were among the least fancied promotion contenders at the start of the season. Champions Bournemouth were promoted to the Second Division for the first time in their history thanks to the efforts of hard working manager Harry Redknapp. Runners-up spot went to Bruce Rioch's Middlesbrough, who had begun the season on the verge of extinction and had been forced to play their first home game of the season at Hartlepool's ground because the official receiver had locked them out of Ayresome Park.

The relegation/promotion play-offs between the Third and Fourth Divisions saw Bolton Wanderers go down to the bottom division for the first time. Newport County, Darlington and Carlisle United went down automatically. The Fourth Division would be familiar territory for Newport and Darlington, but Carlisle had not played in the Fourth Division for nearly a quarter of a century and just three years earlier had been in the race for a First Division place. Defeat in the playoffs meant that Bolton Wanderers would be playing Fourth Division football for the first time in their history.

Football LeagueThird Division
- Season: 1986–87
- Champions: Bournemouth (1st title)
- Promoted: Middlesbrough; Swindon Town
- Relegated: Bolton Wanderers; Carlisle United; Darlington; Newport County
- Matches: 552
- Goals: 1,471 (2.66 per match)
- Top goalscorer: Andy Jones (Port Vale), 29

Pos	Team	Pld	W	D	L	GF	GA	GD	Pts	Promotion or relegation
1	Bournemouth (C, P)	46	29	10	7	76	40	+36	97	Promotion to the Second Division
2	Middlesbrough (P)	46	28	10	8	67	30	+37	94	Promotion to the Second Division
3	Swindon Town (O, P)	46	25	12	9	77	47	+30	87	Qualification for the Third Division play-offs
4	Wigan Athletic	46	25	10	11	83	60	+23	85	Qualification for the Third Division play-offs
5	Gillingham	46	23	9	14	65	48	+17	78	Qualification for the Third Division play-offs
6	Bristol City	46	21	14	11	63	36	+27	77	
7	Notts County	46	21	13	12	77	56	+21	76	
8	Walsall	46	22	9	15	80	67	+13	75	
9	Blackpool	46	16	16	14	74	59	+15	64	
10	Mansfield Town	46	15	16	15	52	55	−3	61	
11	Brentford	46	15	15	16	64	66	−2	60	
12	Port Vale	46	15	12	19	76	70	+6	57	
13	Doncaster Rovers	46	14	15	17	56	62	−6	57	
14	Rotherham United	46	15	12	19	48	57	−9	57	
15	Chester City	46	13	17	16	61	59	+2	56	
16	Bury	46	14	13	19	54	60	−6	55	
17	Chesterfield	46	13	15	18	56	69	−13	54	
18	Fulham	46	12	17	17	59	77	−18	53	
19	Bristol Rovers	46	13	12	21	49	75	−26	51	
20	York City	46	12	13	21	55	79	−24	49	
21	Bolton Wanderers (R)	46	10	15	21	46	58	−12	45	Qualification for the Fourth Division play-offs
22	Carlisle United (R)	46	10	8	28	39	78	−39	38	Relegation to the Fourth Division
23	Darlington (R)	46	7	16	23	45	77	−32	37	Relegation to the Fourth Division
24	Newport County (R)	46	8	13	25	49	86	−37	37	Relegation to the Fourth Division

(C) Champions; (O) Play-off winners; (P) Promoted; (R) Relegated

=== Third Division play-offs ===
Both the semifinals and the finals were decided over two legs.
The full results can be found at: Football League Division Three play-offs 1987.

Semi-finals; 1st leg –14 May; 2nd leg –17 May 1987
20th	Sunderland (Div 2)	2	4	6
5th	Gillingham (Note: After the second leg and an extra time the aggregate was 6–6, but Gillingham had scored 3 times at Sunderland, versus Sunderland 2 times at Gillingham, and thus Gillingham progressed to finals on away goals.)	3	3	6
3rd	Swindon Town	3	0	3
4th	Wigan Athletic	2	0	2

Finals; 1st leg –22 May; 2nd leg –25 May 1987
3rd	Swindon Town (Note: Swindon won the replay 2–0, and were thus promoted to Division 2.)	0	2	2
5th	Gillingham	1	1	2

Replay

29 May 1987

Swindon Town	2 –0	Gillingham
	Report/Soccerbase

Selhurst Park, South Norwood, London
Attendance: 18,491

=== Third Division results ===
Home \ Away	BLP	BOL	BOU	BRE	BRC	BRR	BRY	CRL	CHE	CHF	DAR	DON	FUL	GIL	MAN	MID	NPC	NTC	PTV	ROT	SWI	WAL	WIG	YOR
Blackpool		1–1	1–3	2–0	1–0	6–1	1–1	1–2	1–0	0–0	2–1	1–1	1–0	0–1	1–2	0–1	1–1	3–1	2–0	1–0	1–1	1–1	5–1	2–1
Bolton Wanderers	1–0		0–1	0–2	0–0	2–2	2–3	2–0	1–1	1–2	4–3	0–1	3–2	3–0	0–1	0–1	0–1	1–1	3–0	0–0	1–2	1–0	1–2	3–1
Bournemouth	1–1	2–1		1–1	2–0	2–0	1–0	2–1	2–0	2–0	1–0	3–2	3–2	0–2	4–1	3–1	2–1	3–0	0–0	2–0	1–0	1–0	3–1	3–0
Brentford	1–1	1–2	1–1		1–1	1–2	0–2	3–1	3–1	2–2	5–3	1–1	3–3	3–2	3–1	0–1	2–0	1–0	0–2	2–0	1–1	0–1	2–3	3–1
Bristol City	3–1	4–1	2–0	0–2		0–1	2–2	3–0	1–0	1–0	1–1	5–0	0–0	2–0	0–0	2–2	4–0	3–1	1–0	0–1	1–1	2–1	2–1	3–0
Bristol Rovers	2–2	1–0	0–3	0–1	0–0		1–1	4–0	3–2	3–2	2–1	2–3	0–0	0–1	0–0	1–2	2–2	0–0	0–0	0–2	3–4	0–3	1–0	1–0
Bury	4–1	0–0	0–1	1–1	1–2	1–0		0–0	1–1	1–1	2–0	2–0	2–1	1–0	1–1	0–3	4–3	0–2	2–2	0–2	1–2	4–0	1–3	1–0
Carlisle United	3–1	0–0	0–0	0–0	1–2	2–0	2–1		0–2	3–0	1–0	1–0	1–3	2–4	1–2	0–1	2–2	0–2	2–0	3–5	0–3	0–3	0–2	2–2
Chester City	1–4	0–0	2–2	1–1	0–3	3–1	0–1	2–2		1–1	6–0	1–0	2–2	1–1	1–1	1–2	2–0	1–2	1–2	1–0	2–0	0–0	1–2	2–1
Chesterfield	1–1	0–0	1–1	1–2	0–3	1–1	1–1	3–2	0–1		1–0	4–1	3–1	1–0	0–1	2–1	3–2	1–2	2–4	2–1	1–3	3–2	4–3	1–0
Darlington	1–1	0–1	0–3	1–1	0–0	1–1	4–1	0–1	1–0	1–1		2–2	0–1	1–1	2–1	0–1	1–3	2–1	3–2	1–1	0–0	1–3	1–0	2–2
Doncaster Rovers	2–2	3–0	0–3	2–0	1–0	2–0	0–0	2–0	1–1	1–1	0–0		2–1	2–0	1–0	0–2	0–1	1–2	2–1	3–0	2–2	1–1	1–1	3–1
Fulham	0–1	4–2	1–3	1–3	0–3	2–2	2–1	3–0	0–5	3–1	3–1	0–0		2–2	1–1	2–2	2–0	3–1	0–6	1–1	0–2	2–2	2–2	1–0
Gillingham	2–1	1–0	2–1	2–0	1–1	4–1	1–0	1–0	1–2	3–0	4–1	2–1	4–1		2–0	0–0	1–1	3–1	0–0	1–0	1–0	4–0	0–0	2–0
Mansfield Town	1–1	2–2	1–1	1–0	2–0	5–0	1–3	2–0	2–3	1–1	1–0	2–1	1–1	1–0		1–1	1–0	1–2	0–1	0–0	0–0	2–0	1–5	1–1
Middlesbrough	1–3	0–0	4–0	2–0	1–0	1–0	3–1	1–0	1–2	2–0	1–1	1–0	3–0	3–0	1–0		2–0	2–0	2–2	0–0	1–0	3–1	0–0	3–1
Newport County	1–1	2–1	0–1	2–2	0–1	0–1	2–2	1–1	2–2	1–0	3–0	3–2	0–0	1–2	0–3	0–1		1–1	0–2	1–2	2–2	2–4	1–2	1–1
Notts County	3–2	0–0	1–1	1–1	2–0	3–0	1–2	2–1	1–1	2–1	2–2	3–1	2–3	3–1	0–0	1–0	5–2		4–1	5–0	2–3	2–1	2–0	5–1
Port Vale	1–6	1–1	1–2	4–1	0–0	4–1	2–0	0–1	2–1	2–2	1–2	4–2	0–1	1–2	3–2	0–0	6–1	1–1		1–1	3–4	4–1	0–1	2–3
Rotherham United	1–0	1–0	4–2	2–3	2–0	0–1	2–1	2–1	3–0	0–1	0–0	2–0	0–0	0–1	2–2	1–4	3–1	1–1	1–1		1–2	1–0	0–2	0–0
Swindon Town	2–6	2–0	1–1	2–0	1–2	1–2	1–0	2–0	1–1	2–1	1–0	1–1	2–0	1–1	3–0	1–0	3–0	1–2	1–0	2–0		0–0	3–1	3–1
Walsall	2–1	3–3	2–0	5–2	1–1	0–3	3–1	3–0	2–1	2–0	4–2	1–3	1–1	1–0	2–0	1–0	2–0	1–1	5–2	4–1	1–0		2–3	3–2
Wigan Athletic	4–1	2–1	0–2	1–1	3–1	4–3	1–0	2–0	2–2	1–1	1–1	1–1	2–0	3–1	3–0	0–2	1–2	1–0	2–1	2–1	3–2	5–1		3–2
York City	1–1	2–1	2–0	2–1	1–1	1–0	1–0	2–0	1–1	1–1	3–1	1–1	1–1	2–1	1–3	3–1	3–0	1–1	1–4	2–1	0–3	1–5	1–1	

Source: Soccerbase
Legend: Blue = home team win; Yellow = draw; Red = away team win.

=== Third Division maps ===
Locations of the Football League Third Division London teams 1986–1987
Locations of the Football League Third Division teams 1986–1987

== Fourth Division ==
The stars of the Fourth Division during 1986-87 were Graham Carr's runaway champions Northampton Town, with young midfielder Eddie McGoldrick being the key player in his side's season of success. Northampton were confirmed as promoted with nine matches (19.6% of all matches) remaining, the earliest promotion in Football League history to date.

Also automatically promoted were Preston North End and Southend United. The fourth promotion place went to Aldershot by winning the promotion/relegation playoffs.

Down at the bottom end of the division, an injury time winner for Torquay United kept them in the Football League after a police dog had bitten one of their players. The introduction of automatic relegation to the Conference saw Lincoln City lose their league status in favour of Conference champions Scarborough.

Burnley – league champions 27 years earlier – plummeted to new depths. They finished third from bottom in the league and only a win on the last day of the season prevented them from going down to the Conference.

Football LeagueFourth Division
- Season: 1986–87
- Champions: Northampton Town (1st title)
- Promoted: Aldershot; Preston North End; Southend United
- Relegated: Lincoln City
- Matches: 552
- Goals: 1,456 (2.64 per match)
- Top goalscorer: Richard Hill (Northampton Town), 29

Pos	Team	Pld	W	D	L	GF	GA	GD	Pts	Promotion or relegation
1	Northampton Town (C, P)	46	30	9	7	103	53	+50	99	Promotion to the Third Division
2	Preston North End (P)	46	26	12	8	72	47	+25	90	Promotion to the Third Division
3	Southend United (P)	46	25	5	16	68	55	+13	80	Promotion to the Third Division
4	Wolverhampton Wanderers	46	24	7	15	69	50	+19	79	Qualification for the Fourth Division play-offs
5	Colchester United	46	21	7	18	64	56	+8	70	Qualification for the Fourth Division play-offs
6	Aldershot (O, P)	46	20	10	16	64	57	+7	70	Qualification for the Fourth Division play-offs
7	Orient	46	20	9	17	64	61	+3	69	
8	Scunthorpe United	46	18	12	16	73	57	+16	66	
9	Wrexham	46	15	20	11	70	51	+19	65	
10	Peterborough United	46	17	14	15	57	50	+7	65	
11	Cambridge United	46	17	11	18	60	62	−2	62	
12	Swansea City	46	17	11	18	56	61	−5	62	
13	Cardiff City	46	15	16	15	48	50	−2	61	
14	Exeter City	46	11	23	12	53	49	+4	56	
15	Halifax Town	46	15	10	21	59	74	−15	55	
16	Hereford United	46	14	11	21	60	61	−1	53	
17	Crewe Alexandra	46	13	14	19	70	72	−2	53	
18	Hartlepool United	46	11	18	17	44	65	−21	51	
19	Stockport County	46	13	12	21	40	69	−29	51	
20	Tranmere Rovers	46	11	17	18	54	72	−18	50	
21	Rochdale	46	11	17	18	54	73	−19	50	
22	Burnley	46	12	13	21	53	74	−21	49	
23	Torquay United	46	10	18	18	56	72	−16	48	
24	Lincoln City (R)	46	12	12	22	45	65	−20	48	Relegation to the Football Conference

(C) Champions; (O) Play-off winners; (P) Promoted; (R) Relegated

=== Fourth Division play-offs ===
Both the semifinals and the finals were decided over two legs, and only the aggregates are given in the schemata below.
The full results can be found at: Football League Division Four play-offs 1987.

Semi-finals; 1st leg –14 May; 2nd leg –17 May 1987
21st	Bolton Wanderers (Div 3)	0	2	2
6th	Aldershot	1	2	3
4th	Wolverhampton Wanderers	2	0	2
5th	Colchester United	0	0	0

Finals; 1st leg –23 May; 2nd leg –25 May 1987
6th	Aldershot	2	1	3
4th	Wolverhampton Wanderers	0	0	0

=== Fourth Division results ===
Home \ Away	ALD	BUR	CAM	CAR	COL	CRE	EXE	HAL	HAR	HER	LEY	LIN	NOR	PET	PNE	ROC	SCU	STD	STP	SWA	TOR	TRA	WOL	WRE
Aldershot		2–0	4–1	1–2	1–0	1–0	2–1	4–1	1–1	1–0	1–2	4–0	3–3	1–1	0–0	2–1	2–1	0–1	3–0	4–1	1–1	0–2	1–2	1–0
Burnley	0–1		0–2	1–3	2–1	4–0	0–0	3–0	1–1	0–6	2–1	3–1	2–1	0–0	1–4	0–3	1–0	2–1	2–0	1–1	2–2	2–2	2–5	0–0
Cambridge United	0–3	3–1		2–1	0–1	0–3	2–2	1–0	3–0	2–1	2–0	1–1	2–3	1–1	2–0	3–0	1–0	1–2	5–0	1–0	3–3	1–1	0–0	1–0
Cardiff City	2–0	1–0	3–0		0–2	1–1	0–0	0–0	4–1	4–0	1–1	1–1	1–1	0–1	1–1	0–0	1–1	0–2	1–1	0–0	3–1	0–2	0–2	0–0
Colchester United	0–1	1–0	1–2	3–1		2–1	1–1	3–1	2–1	2–0	0–0	2–0	3–1	1–3	0–2	2–0	1–0	1–2	5–1	2–1	3–0	1–1	3–0	2–1
Crewe Alexandra	1–3	1–0	0–0	1–2	1–1		2–2	2–2	1–0	1–2	3–2	1–2	0–5	1–3	2–2	5–1	2–2	2–1	5–0	1–1	1–0	3–2	1–1	1–1
Exeter City	4–0	3–0	1–1	0–0	2–0	1–0		2–2	2–0	1–0	1–0	2–0	1–1	1–1	1–2	1–1	0–0	0–0	4–0	2–2	2–2	1–0	1–3	4–2
Halifax Town	1–0	2–2	1–0	1–1	0–0	0–3	2–0		1–0	2–1	4–0	1–2	3–6	1–0	1–3	3–1	1–1	0–1	0–2	1–0	2–4	0–0	3–4	2–1
Hartlepool United	1–1	2–2	2–2	1–1	0–0	0–5	1–0	0–0		0–0	1–3	2–1	3–3	1–2	2–2	1–1	0–2	1–0	1–0	1–1	2–1	1–1	0–1	0–1
Hereford United	1–0	2–0	2–3	0–2	2–3	2–0	1–1	1–0	4–0		1–1	0–0	3–2	2–0	2–3	0–1	2–2	0–1	1–2	2–0	2–2	1–0	2–0	0–0
Leyton Orient	1–3	2–0	3–0	2–0	1–0	1–1	2–0	1–3	2–0	2–0		2–1	0–1	1–0	1–2	3–0	3–1	1–0	1–0	1–4	3–2	2–2	3–1	2–4
Lincoln City	0–2	2–1	0–3	0–1	3–1	2–1	1–1	0–0	1–4	0–0	2–0		3–1	1–2	1–1	1–1	1–2	1–3	0–0	4–0	1–1	3–1	3–0	0–1
Northampton Town	4–2	4–2	3–0	4–1	3–2	2–1	4–0	1–0	1–1	3–2	2–0	3–1		2–1	3–1	5–0	1–0	2–1	2–1	0–1	1–0	2–0	2–1	2–2
Peterborough United	1–1	1–1	2–1	1–2	2–0	1–2	2–2	2–0	3–1	2–1	0–1	0–1	0–1		2–1	1–1	1–1	2–0	0–0	1–1	2–1	2–1	0–1	1–0
Preston North End	1–2	2–1	1–0	0–1	1–0	2–1	2–1	3–2	0–0	2–1	1–0	3–0	1–0	0–0		2–4	2–1	2–0	3–0	2–1	1–1	2–0	2–2	1–0
Rochdale	3–1	0–2	2–0	0–0	1–0	1–1	0–0	5–3	0–2	2–0	0–0	1–1	1–2	3–2	0–2		1–1	1–2	2–1	2–0	3–3	0–1	0–3	3–3
Scunthorpe United	2–0	2–1	1–1	1–3	5–2	2–1	3–1	2–1	1–2	3–1	0–2	2–1	2–2	2–0	4–0	2–0		3–0	1–2	3–2	2–0	6–0	0–2	3–3
Southend United	2–0	2–1	3–1	2–0	1–1	3–1	2–1	2–3	1–1	2–0	2–1	1–0	0–4	2–2	1–2	5–3	3–1		0–0	1–2	4–0	3–0	1–0	0–3
Stockport County	0–0	0–1	3–2	2–0	1–1	2–1	0–0	2–0	0–2	1–2	2–2	1–0	0–3	3–1	1–3	1–1	1–0	0–2		3–1	0–0	0–2	0–2	2–1
Swansea City	2–1	2–2	2–0	2–0	1–2	1–1	1–0	0–2	1–0	1–3	4–1	2–0	2–1	0–1	1–1	1–0	1–2	1–0	3–0		0–1	2–0	1–0	0–3
Torquay United	2–2	1–1	1–0	1–0	3–1	2–2	1–1	1–0	0–1	1–1	2–2	0–1	0–1	1–0	0–2	2–1	2–2	2–1	0–0	3–5		0–2	1–2	2–1
Tranmere Rovers	1–1	2–1	1–1	2–1	3–4	3–2	1–0	3–4	1–1	3–3	1–3	2–0	1–1	1–1	1–1	1–1	1–0	1–3	0–3	1–1	2–2		0–1	0–2
Wolverhampton Wanderers	3–0	0–1	1–2	0–1	2–0	2–3	2–2	1–2	4–1	1–0	3–1	3–0	1–1	0–3	1–0	0–0	1–0	1–2	3–1	4–0	1–0	2–1		0–3
Wrexham	3–0	2–2	2–1	5–1	0–1	2–1	0–0	3–1	1–1	2–2	1–1	1–1	1–3	4–3	1–1	2–2	1–1	4–0	0–0	0–0	2–1	1–1	0–0	

Source: Soccerbase
Legend: Blue = home team win; Yellow = draw; Red = away team win.

=== Fourth Division maps ===
Locations of the Football League Fourth Division London teams 1986–1987
Locations of the Football League Fourth Division teams 1986–1987

== Attendances ==
=== Division One ===
No.	Club	Average
1	Manchester United	40,594
2	Liverpool FC	36,286
3	Everton FC	32,935
4	Arsenal FC	29,022
5	Tottenham Hotspur FC	25,881
6	Newcastle United FC	24,792
7	Sheffield Wednesday FC	23,148
8	Manchester City FC	21,922
9	West Ham United FC	20,608
10	Nottingham Forest FC	19,086
11	Aston Villa FC	18,172
12	Chelsea FC	17,694
13	Norwich City FC	17,564
14	Coventry City FC	16,120
15	Watford FC	15,800
16	Southampton FC	14,950
17	Queens Park Rangers FC	11,754
18	Leicester City FC	11,697
19	Oxford United FC	10,357
20	Luton Town FC	10,256
21	Charlton Athletic FC	9,012
22	Wimbledon FC	7,811

=== Division Two ===
No.	Club	Average
1	Leeds United FC	17,612
2	Derby County FC	15,539
3	Sunderland AFC	13,601
4	Portsmouth FC	13,404
5	Plymouth Argyle FC	12,387
6	Ipswich Town FC	12,123
7	Sheffield United FC	9,992
8	Stoke City FC	9,986
9	West Bromwich Albion FC	9,134
10	Brighton & Hove Albion FC	8,293
11	Bradford City AFC	8,246
12	Crystal Palace FC	7,583
13	Birmingham City FC	7,427
14	Oldham Athletic FC	6,884
15	Reading FC	6,883
16	Blackburn Rovers FC	6,773
17	Hull City FC	6,683
18	Huddersfield Town AFC	6,617
19	Barnsley FC	5,870
20	Grimsby Town FC	5,050
21	Millwall FC	4,304
22	Shrewsbury Town FC	4,097

=== Division Three ===
No.	Club	Average
1	Middlesbrough FC	10,174
2	Bristol City FC	9,441
3	Swindon Town FC	7,709
4	AFC Bournemouth	6,611
5	Walsall FC	5,313
6	Gillingham FC	4,971
7	Bolton Wanderers FC	4,851
8	Notts County FC	4,729
9	Fulham FC	4,085
10	Brentford FC	3,918
11	Blackpool FC	3,866
12	York City FC	3,432
13	Wigan Athletic FC	3,398
14	Port Vale FC	3,312
15	Bristol Rovers FC	3,246
16	Mansfield Town FC	3,216
17	Rotherham United FC	2,983
18	Chester City FC	2,732
19	Carlisle United FC	2,644
20	Chesterfield FC	2,576
21	Bury FC	2,502
22	Doncaster Rovers FC	2,408
23	Newport County AFC	2,063
24	Darlington FC	2,037

=== Division Four ===
No.	Club	Average
1	Preston North End FC	8,079
2	Northampton Town FC	6,316
3	Wolverhampton Wanderers FC	5,754
4	Swansea City AFC	5,169
5	Peterborough United FC	3,715
6	Southend United FC	3,686
7	Burnley FC	3,342
8	Leyton Orient FC	2,857
9	Cardiff City FC	2,826
10	Cambridge United FC	2,780
11	Colchester United FC	2,740
12	Exeter City FC	2,628
13	Hereford United FC	2,584
14	Wrexham AFC	2,521
15	Aldershot Town FC	2,359
16	Rochdale AFC	2,151
17	Tranmere Rovers	2,126
18	Scunthorpe United FC	2,126
19	Stockport County FC	2,113
20	Lincoln City FC	2,023
21	Crewe Alexandra FC	1,932
22	Torquay United FC	1,777
23	Hartlepool United FC	1,651
24	Halifax Town AFC	1,327

== See also ==
- 1986–87 in English football
