= 1989–90 Football League =

91st season of the Football League

The Football League
- Season: 1989–90
- Champions: Liverpool
- Relegated: Colchester United
- New club in League: Maidstone United

The 1989–90 season was the 91st completed season of The Football League.

Liverpool overhauled a greatly improved Aston Villa side to win their 18th league championship trophy and their fifth major trophy in as many seasons under Kenny Dalglish's management. Gary Lineker's arrival at Tottenham Hotspur saw the North Londoners occupy third place after a season of improvement.

In this season, London had eight entrants in the top-flight, the highest number of participants ever.

Luton Town stayed up on goal difference at the expense of Sheffield Wednesday, while Charlton's four-year spell in the First Division came to an end at the beginning of May. Millwall were rooted to the bottom of the division despite briefly topping the league in September.

Leeds United finally returned to the top flight after an eight-year exile, as Howard Wilkinson's side lifted the Second Division championship trophy thanks to a superior goal difference over runners-up Sheffield United, who won their second successive promotion under Dave Bassett.

Swindon Town won the Second Division playoff final but Sunderland were promoted instead after the Swindon board admitted a series of financial irregularities. Swindon were initially demoted to the Third Division and replaced by Tranmere, the division's losing Play-Off finalists, but this decision was later reversed on appeal.

AFC Bournemouth, Stoke City and Bradford City occupied the relegation places. Bournemouth did not return to second tier of English football until the 2013–14 season.

The city of Bristol was celebrating after Rovers were crowned champions and City finished runners-up in the Third Division to gain promotion. The third promotion spot was secured by playoff winners Notts County, who beat Leyland DAF Trophy (i.e. EFL Trophy) winners Tranmere Rovers at Wembley.

Walsall suffered a second successive relegation and would be joined in the Fourth Division the following season by Blackpool, Cardiff City and Northampton Town.

Exeter City were crowned Fourth Division champions and went up to the Third Division along with runners-up Grimsby Town, third-placed Southend United and playoff winners Cambridge United. Newly promoted Maidstone United almost ended their first league season with success, but their promotion hopes were ended by playoff failure.

Colchester United were relegated from the league and replaced by Football Conference champions Darlington, who regained their league status just one season after losing it.

== Final league tables and results ==
The tables and results below are reproduced here in the exact form that they can be found at The Rec.Sport.Soccer Statistics Foundation website, with home and away statistics separated.

== First Division ==
First Division
- Season: 1989–90
- Champions: Liverpool; 18th English title
- Relegated: Sheffield Wednesday; Charlton Athletic; Millwall
- European Cup Winners' Cup: Manchester United
- UEFA Cup: Aston Villa
- Matches: 380
- Goals: 986 (2.59 per match)
- Top goalscorer: Gary Lineker (24 goals)
- Biggest home win: Liverpool 9–0 Crystal Palace (12 September 1989)
- Biggest away win: Coventry City 1–6 Liverpool (5 May 1990)
- Highest scoring: Liverpool 9–0 Crystal Palace (12 September 1989); Southampton 6–3 Luton Town (25 November 1989)

Liverpool won the First Division title for the 18th time, finishing nine points ahead of their nearest rivals Aston Villa, who had emerged as title contenders just two seasons after being promoted, sealing England's solitary UEFA Cup place after the ban on English clubs in European competitions was lifted after five years, although Liverpool missed out on a European Cup place following UEFA's decision to exclude them from European competitions for at least one more season. Tottenham Hotspur improved on their sixth-place finish in 1989 by finishing third. Defending champions Arsenal slipped to fourth, and newly promoted Chelsea finished fifth.

Manchester United finished a disappointing 13th in the league – their lowest since relegation in 1974 – but compensated for this by winning the FA Cup, equalling the record of seven wins in the competition.

Millwall, who briefly topped the table in mid September, went down in bottom place after winning just two more games all season. Charlton Athletic's four-year spell in the First Division ended in relegation, and the final relegation place went to a Sheffield Wednesday side who went down on goal difference after a late turnaround in form for Luton Town.

Pos	Team	Pld	W	D	L	GF	GA	GD	Pts	Qualification or relegation
1	Liverpool (C)	38	23	10	5	78	37	+41	79	Disqualified from the European Cup (Note: Liverpool were banned by UEFA from its competitions from the season 1985–86 on for 10 years, because of the Heysel Stadium disaster in 1985, involving Liverpool fans. The ban was eventually lifted for the 1991–92 season.)
2	Aston Villa	38	21	7	10	57	38	+19	70	Qualification for the UEFA Cup first round
3	Tottenham Hotspur	38	19	6	13	59	47	+12	63	
4	Arsenal	38	18	8	12	54	38	+16	62	
5	Chelsea	38	16	12	10	58	50	+8	60	
6	Everton	38	17	8	13	57	46	+11	59	
7	Southampton	38	15	10	13	71	63	+8	55	
8	Wimbledon	38	13	16	9	47	40	+7	55	
9	Nottingham Forest	38	15	9	14	55	47	+8	54	
10	Norwich City	38	13	14	11	44	42	+2	53	
11	Queens Park Rangers	38	13	11	14	45	44	+1	50	
12	Coventry City	38	14	7	17	39	59	−20	49	
13	Manchester United	38	13	9	16	46	47	−1	48	Qualification for the European Cup Winners' Cup first round (Note: Manchester United qualified for the UEFA Cup Winners' Cup as the 1989–90 FA Cup winners.)
14	Manchester City	38	12	12	14	43	52	−9	48	
15	Crystal Palace	38	13	9	16	42	66	−24	48	
16	Derby County	38	13	7	18	43	40	+3	46	
17	Luton Town	38	10	13	15	43	57	−14	43	
18	Sheffield Wednesday (R)	38	11	10	17	35	51	−16	43	Relegation to the Second Division
19	Charlton Athletic (R)	38	7	9	22	31	57	−26	30	Relegation to the Second Division
20	Millwall (R)	38	5	11	22	39	65	−26	26	Relegation to the Second Division

Source: World Football
Rules for classification: 1) Points; 2) Goal difference; 3) Goals scored
(C) Champions; (R) Relegated

== Results ==
Home \ Away	ARS	AST	CHA	CHE	COV	CRY	DER	EVE	LIV	LUT	MCI	MUN	MIL	NWC	NOT	QPR	SHW	SOU	TOT	WDN
Arsenal		0–1	1–0	0–1	2–0	4–1	1–1	1–0	1–1	3–2	4–0	1–0	2–0	4–3	3–0	3–0	5–0	2–1	1–0	0–0
Aston Villa	2–1		1–1	1–0	4–1	2–1	1–0	6–2	1–1	2–0	1–2	3–0	1–0	3–3	2–1	1–3	1–0	2–1	2–0	0–3
Charlton Athletic	0–0	0–2		3–0	1–1	1–2	0–0	0–1	0–4	2–0	1–1	2–0	1–1	0–1	1–1	1–0	1–2	2–4	1–3	1–2
Chelsea	0–0	0–3	3–1		1–0	3–0	1–1	2–1	2–5	1–0	1–1	1–0	4–0	0–0	2–2	1–1	4–0	2–2	1–2	2–5
Coventry City	0–1	2–0	1–2	3–2		1–0	1–0	2–0	1–6	1–0	2–1	1–4	3–1	1–0	0–2	1–1	1–4	1–0	0–0	2–1
Crystal Palace	1–1	1–0	2–0	2–2	0–1		1–1	2–1	0–2	1–1	2–2	1–1	4–3	1–0	1–0	0–3	1–1	3–1	2–3	2–0
Derby County	1–3	0–1	2–0	0–1	4–1	3–1		0–1	0–3	2–3	6–0	2–0	2–0	0–2	0–2	2–0	2–0	0–1	2–1	1–1
Everton	3–0	3–3	2–1	0–1	2–0	4–0	2–1		1–3	2–1	0–0	3–2	2–1	3–1	4–0	1–0	2–0	3–0	2–1	1–1
Liverpool	2–1	1–1	1–0	4–1	0–1	9–0	1–0	2–1		2–2	3–1	0–0	1–0	0–0	2–2	2–1	2–1	3–2	1–0	2–1
Luton Town	2–0	0–1	1–0	0–3	3–2	1–0	1–0	2–2	0–0		1–1	1–3	2–1	4–1	1–1	1–1	2–0	1–1	0–0	1–1
Manchester City	1–1	0–2	1–2	1–1	1–0	3–0	0–1	1–0	1–4	3–1		5–1	2–0	1–0	0–3	1–0	2–1	1–2	1–1	1–1
Manchester United	4–1	2–0	1–0	0–0	3–0	1–2	1–2	0–0	1–2	4–1	1–1		5–1	0–2	1–0	0–0	0–0	2–1	0–1	0–0
Millwall	1–2	2–0	2–2	1–3	4–1	1–2	1–1	1–2	1–2	1–1	1–1	1–2		0–1	1–0	1–2	2–0	2–2	0–1	0–0
Norwich City	2–2	2–0	0–0	2–0	0–0	2–0	1–0	1–1	0–0	2–0	0–1	2–0	1–1		1–1	0–0	2–1	4–4	2–2	0–1
Nottingham Forest	1–2	1–1	2–0	1–1	2–4	3–1	2–1	1–0	2–2	3–0	1–0	4–0	3–1	0–1		2–2	0–1	2–0	1–3	0–1
Queens Park Rangers	2–0	1–1	0–1	4–2	1–1	2–0	0–1	1–0	3–2	0–0	1–3	1–2	0–0	2–1	2–0		1–0	1–4	3–1	2–3
Sheffield Wednesday	1–0	1–0	3–0	1–1	0–0	2–2	1–0	1–1	2–0	1–1	2–0	1–0	1–1	0–2	0–3	2–0		0–1	2–4	0–1
Southampton	1–0	2–1	3–2	2–3	3–0	1–1	2–1	2–2	4–1	6–3	2–1	0–2	1–2	4–1	2–0	0–2	2–2		1–1	2–2
Tottenham Hotspur	2–1	0–2	3–0	1–4	3–2	0–1	1–2	2–1	1–0	2–1	1–1	2–1	3–1	4–0	2–3	3–2	3–0	2–1		0–1
Wimbledon	1–0	0–2	3–1	0–1	0–0	0–1	1–1	3–1	1–2	1–2	1–0	2–2	2–2	1–1	1–3	0–0	1–1	3–3	1–0	

Legend: Blue = home team win; Yellow = draw; Red = away team win.

=== First Division maps ===
Locations of the Football League First Division 1989–1990 teams
Locations of the Football League First Division London teams 1989–1990

== Second Division ==
Second Division
- Season: 1989–90
- Champions: Leeds United
- Promoted: Leeds United; Sheffield United; Sunderland
- Relegated: Bournemouth; Bradford City; Stoke City
- Matches: 552
- Goals: 1,526 (2.76 per match)
- Top goalscorer: Micky Quinn (32 goals)

A tight race for promotion from the Second Division saw the two automatic promotion places decided on the final day of the season, with Leeds United going up as champions after an eight-year exile from the First Division, followed by their Yorkshire rivals Sheffield United, who finished runners-up to clinch a second successive promotion and end their 14-year absence from the First Division.

Swindon Town beat Sunderland 1–0 in the playoff final to secure a First Division place for the first time, only for promotion to be withdrawn weeks later for financial irregularities. The Football League promoted Sunderland to the First Division in their place, and demoted them to the Third Division, although they were allowed to remain in the Second Division on appeal. Newcastle United, whose new signing Mick Quinn topped the Football League goal charts with 32 goals, had squandered their chance on an immediate return to the First Division by losing to Sunderland in the playoff semi-finals. Blackburn Rovers, who had last played First Division football in the mid-1960s, lost in the other semi-final.

Two of the teams who just missed out on the playoffs enjoyed memorable cup runs. West Ham United reached the semi-finals of the League Cup, while Oldham Athletic were semi-finalists in the FA Cup and beaten finalists in the League Cup.

Stoke City were relegated to the Third Division after finishing bottom of the Second Division, and were joined in the drop zone by Bradford City and AFC Bournemouth. Middlesbrough, who finished fourth from bottom, narrowly avoided a second successive relegation.

Pos	Team	Pld	W	D	L	GF	GA	GD	Pts	Qualification or relegation
1	Leeds United (C, P)	46	24	13	9	79	52	+27	85	Promotion to the First Division
2	Sheffield United (P)	46	24	13	9	78	58	+20	85	Promotion to the First Division
3	Newcastle United	46	22	14	10	80	55	+25	80	Qualification for the Second Division play-offs
4	Swindon Town (Note: Swindon Town were disqualified from promotion after being found guilty of making illegal payments, and the play-off runners-up Sunderland were promoted in their place.) (O)	46	20	14	12	79	59	+20	74	Qualification for the Second Division play-offs
5	Blackburn Rovers	46	19	17	10	74	59	+15	74	Qualification for the Second Division play-offs
6	Sunderland (P)	46	20	14	12	70	64	+6	74	Qualification for the Second Division play-offs
7	West Ham United	46	20	12	14	80	57	+23	72	
8	Oldham Athletic	46	19	14	13	70	57	+13	71	
9	Ipswich Town	46	19	12	15	67	66	+1	69	
10	Wolverhampton Wanderers	46	18	13	15	67	60	+7	67	
11	Port Vale	46	15	16	15	62	57	+5	61	
12	Portsmouth	46	15	16	15	62	65	−3	61	
13	Leicester City	46	15	14	17	67	79	−12	59	
14	Hull City	46	14	16	16	58	65	−7	58	
15	Watford	46	14	15	17	58	60	−2	57	
16	Plymouth Argyle	46	14	13	19	58	63	−5	55	
17	Oxford United	46	15	9	22	57	66	−9	54	
18	Brighton & Hove Albion	46	15	9	22	56	72	−16	54	
19	Barnsley	46	13	15	18	49	71	−22	54	
20	West Bromwich Albion	46	12	15	19	67	71	−4	51	
21	Middlesbrough	46	13	11	22	52	63	−11	50	
22	Bournemouth (R)	46	12	12	22	57	76	−19	48	Relegation to the Third Division
23	Bradford City (R)	46	9	14	23	44	68	−24	41	Relegation to the Third Division
24	Stoke City (R)	46	6	19	21	35	63	−28	37	Relegation to the Third Division

Source: Statto
Rules for classification: 1) Points; 2) Goal difference; 3) Goals scored
(C) Champions; (O) Play-off winners; (P) Promoted; (R) Relegated

=== Results ===
Home \ Away	BAR	BLB	BOU	BRA	B&HA	HUL	IPS	LEE	LEI	MID	NEW	OLD	OXF	PLY	PTV	POR	SHU	STK	SUN	SWI	WAT	WBA	WHU	WOL
Barnsley		0–0	0–1	2–0	1–0	1–1	0–1	1–0	2–2	1–1	1–1	1–0	1–0	1–1	0–3	0–1	1–2	3–2	1–0	0–1	0–1	2–2	1–1	2–2
Blackburn Rovers	5–0		1–1	2–2	1–1	0–0	2–2	1–2	2–4	2–4	2–0	1–0	2–2	2–0	1–0	2–0	0–0	3–0	1–1	2–1	2–2	2–1	5–4	2–3
Bournemouth	2–1	2–4		1–0	0–2	5–4	3–1	0–1	2–3	2–2	2–1	2–0	0–1	2–2	1–0	0–1	0–1	2–1	0–1	1–2	0–0	1–1	1–1	1–1
Bradford City	0–0	0–1	1–0		2–0	2–3	1–0	0–1	2–0	0–1	3–2	1–1	1–2	0–1	2–2	1–1	1–4	1–0	0–1	1–1	2–1	2–0	2–1	1–1
Brighton & Hove Albion	1–1	1–2	2–1	2–1		2–0	1–0	2–2	1–0	1–0	0–3	1–1	0–1	2–1	2–0	0–0	2–2	1–4	1–2	1–2	1–0	0–3	3–0	1–1
Hull City	1–2	2–0	1–4	2–1	0–2		4–3	0–1	1–1	0–0	1–3	0–0	1–0	3–3	2–1	1–2	0–0	0–0	3–2	2–3	0–0	0–2	1–1	2–0
Ipswich Town	3–1	3–1	1–1	1–0	2–1	0–1		2–2	2–2	3–0	2–1	1–1	1–0	3–0	3–2	0–1	1–1	2–2	1–1	1–0	1–0	3–1	1–0	1–3
Leeds United	1–2	1–1	3–0	1–1	3–0	4–3	1–1		2–1	2–1	1–0	1–1	2–1	2–1	0–0	2–0	4–0	2–0	2–0	4–0	2–1	2–2	3–2	1–0
Leicester City	2–2	0–1	2–1	1–1	1–0	2–1	0–1	4–3		2–1	2–2	3–0	0–0	1–1	2–0	1–1	2–5	2–1	2–3	2–1	1–1	1–3	1–0	0–0
Middlesbrough	0–1	0–3	2–1	2–0	2–2	1–0	1–2	0–2	4–1		4–1	1–0	1–0	0–2	2–3	2–0	3–3	0–1	3–0	0–2	1–2	0–0	0–1	4–2
Newcastle United	4–1	2–1	3–0	1–0	2–0	2–0	2–1	5–2	5–4	2–2		2–1	2–3	3–1	2–2	1–0	2–0	3–0	1–1	0–0	2–1	2–1	2–1	1–4
Oldham Athletic	2–0	2–0	4–0	2–2	1–1	3–2	4–1	3–1	1–0	2–0	1–1		4–1	3–2	2–1	3–3	0–2	2–0	2–1	2–2	1–1	2–1	3–0	1–1
Oxford United	2–3	1–1	1–2	2–1	0–1	0–0	2–2	2–4	4–2	3–1	2–1	0–1		3–2	0–0	2–1	3–0	3–0	0–1	2–2	1–1	0–1	0–2	2–2
Plymouth Argyle	2–1	2–2	1–0	1–1	2–1	1–2	1–0	1–1	3–1	1–2	1–1	2–0	2–0		1–2	0–2	0–0	3–0	3–0	0–3	0–0	2–2	1–1	0–1
Port Vale	2–1	0–0	1–1	3–2	2–1	1–1	5–0	0–0	2–1	1–1	1–2	2–0	1–2	3–0		1–1	1–1	0–0	1–2	2–0	1–0	2–1	2–2	3–1
Portsmouth	2–1	1–1	2–1	3–0	3–0	2–2	2–3	3–3	2–3	3–1	1–1	2–1	2–1	0–3	2–0		3–2	0–0	3–3	1–1	1–2	1–1	0–1	1–3
Sheffield United	1–2	1–2	4–2	1–1	5–4	0–0	2–0	2–2	1–1	1–0	1–1	2–1	2–1	1–0	2–1	2–1		2–1	1–3	2–0	4–1	3–1	0–2	3–0
Stoke City	0–1	0–1	0–0	1–1	3–2	1–1	0–0	1–1	0–1	0–0	2–1	1–2	1–2	0–0	1–1	1–2	0–1		0–2	1–1	2–2	2–1	1–1	2–0
Sunderland	4–2	0–1	3–2	1–0	2–1	0–1	2–4	0–1	2–2	2–1	0–0	2–3	1–0	3–1	2–2	2–2	1–1	2–1		2–2	4–0	1–1	4–3	1–1
Swindon Town	0–0	4–3	2–3	3–1	1–2	1–3	3–0	3–2	1–1	1–1	1–1	3–2	3–0	3–0	3–0	2–2	0–2	6–0	0–2		2–0	2–1	2–2	3–1
Watford	2–2	3–1	2–2	7–2	4–2	3–1	3–3	1–0	3–1	1–0	0–0	3–0	0–1	1–2	1–0	1–0	1–3	1–1	1–1	0–2		0–2	0–1	3–1
West Bromwich Albion	7–0	2–2	2–2	2–0	3–0	1–1	1–3	2–1	0–1	0–0	1–5	2–2	3–2	0–3	2–3	0–0	0–3	1–1	1–1	1–2	2–0		1–3	1–2
West Ham United	4–2	1–1	4–1	2–0	3–1	1–2	2–0	0–1	3–1	2–0	0–0	0–2	3–2	3–2	2–2	2–1	5–0	0–0	5–0	1–1	1–0	2–3		4–0
Wolverhampton Wanderers	1–1	1–2	3–1	1–1	2–4	1–2	2–1	1–0	5–0	2–0	0–1	1–1	2–0	1–0	2–0	5–0	1–2	0–0	0–1	2–1	1–1	2–1	1–0	

Legend: Blue = home team win; Yellow = draw; Red = away team win.

=== Second Division play-offs ===
The semifinals were decided over two legs. The final consisted of only a single match.

Semifinals; 1st leg – 13 May; 2nd leg – 16 May 1990
3rd	Newcastle United	0	0	0
6th	Sunderland	0	2	2
4th	Swindon Town	2	2	4
5th	Blackburn Rovers	1	1	2

Final at Wembley; 28 May 1990
6th	Sunderland (Note: Following successful prosecutions against Swindon Town and the club chairman, Brian Hillier, after they admitted 36 breaches of League rules—35 of which were related to illegal payments—Swindon remained in the Second Division and Sunderland took their promotion place (see History of Swindon Town F.C.).)	0
4th	Swindon Town	1

=== Second Division maps ===
Locations of the Football League Second Division 1989–1990 teams
Locations of the Football League Second Division London teams 1989–1990

== Third Division ==
The two automatic promotion places in the Third Division were clinched by the two Bristol clubs, with Rovers finishing champions and City finishing runners-up, having both been relegated from the Second Division nine years before. The playoffs were won by Notts County.

Walsall finished bottom of the Fourth Division and suffered a second consecutive relegation in their final season at Fellows Park, leaving them in the Fourth Division for their first season at the new Bescot Stadium. Joining them in the bottom four were Blackpool, Cardiff City and Northampton Town.

Football LeagueThird Division
- Season: 1989–90
- Champions: Bristol Rovers (1st title)
- Promoted: Bristol City; Notts County
- Relegated: Blackpool; Cardiff City; Northampton; Walsall
- Matches: 552
- Goals: 1,414 (2.56 per match)
- Top goalscorer: Bob Taylor (Bristol City), 27

Pos	Team	Pld	W	D	L	GF	GA	GD	Pts	Promotion or relegation
1	Bristol Rovers (C, P)	46	26	15	5	71	35	+36	93	Promotion to the Second Division
2	Bristol City (P)	46	27	10	9	76	40	+36	91	Promotion to the Second Division
3	Notts County (O, P)	46	25	12	9	73	53	+20	87	Qualification for the Third Division play-offs
4	Tranmere Rovers	46	23	11	12	86	49	+37	80	Qualification for the Third Division play-offs
5	Bury	46	21	11	14	70	49	+21	74	Qualification for the Third Division play-offs
6	Bolton Wanderers	46	18	15	13	59	48	+11	69	Qualification for the Third Division play-offs
7	Birmingham City	46	18	12	16	60	59	+1	66	
8	Huddersfield Town	46	17	14	15	61	62	−1	65	
9	Rotherham United	46	17	13	16	71	62	+9	64	
10	Reading	46	15	19	12	57	53	+4	64	
11	Shrewsbury Town	46	16	15	15	59	54	+5	63	
12	Crewe Alexandra	46	15	17	14	56	53	+3	62	
13	Brentford	46	18	7	21	66	66	0	61	
14	Leyton Orient	46	16	10	20	52	56	−4	58	
15	Mansfield Town	46	16	7	23	50	65	−15	55	
16	Chester City	46	13	15	18	43	55	−12	54	
17	Swansea City	46	14	12	20	45	63	−18	54	
18	Wigan Athletic	46	13	14	19	48	64	−16	53	
19	Preston North End	46	14	10	22	65	79	−14	52	
20	Fulham	46	12	15	19	55	66	−11	51	
21	Cardiff City (R)	46	12	14	20	51	70	−19	50	Relegation to the Fourth Division
22	Northampton Town (R)	46	11	14	21	51	68	−17	47	Relegation to the Fourth Division
23	Blackpool (R)	46	10	16	20	49	73	−24	46	Relegation to the Fourth Division
24	Walsall (R)	46	9	14	23	40	72	−32	41	Relegation to the Fourth Division

(C) Champions; (O) Play-off winners; (P) Promoted; (R) Relegated

=== Third Division results ===
Home \ Away	BIR	BLP	BOL	BRE	BRI	BRR	BRY	CAR	CHR	CRE	FUL	HUD	LEY	MAN	NOR	NTC	PNE	REA	ROT	SHR	SWA	TRA	WAL	WIG
Birmingham City		3–1	1–0	0–1	0–4	2–2	0–0	1–1	0–0	3–0	1–1	0–1	0–0	4–1	4–0	1–2	3–1	0–1	4–1	0–1	2–0	2–1	2–0	0–0
Blackpool	3–2		2–1	4–0	1–3	0–3	0–1	1–0	1–3	1–3	0–1	2–2	1–0	3–1	1–0	0–0	2–2	0–0	1–2	0–1	2–2	0–3	4–3	0–0
Bolton Wanderers	3–1	2–0		0–1	1–0	1–0	3–1	3–1	1–0	0–0	0–0	2–2	2–1	1–1	0–3	3–0	2–1	3–0	0–2	0–1	0–0	1–1	1–1	3–2
Brentford	0–1	5–0	1–2		0–2	2–1	0–1	0–1	1–1	0–2	2–0	2–1	4–3	2–1	3–2	0–1	2–2	1–1	4–2	1–1	2–1	2–4	4–0	3–1
Bristol City	1–0	2–0	1–1	2–0		0–0	1–0	1–0	1–0	4–1	5–1	1–1	2–1	1–1	3–1	2–0	2–1	0–1	0–0	2–1	1–3	1–3	4–0	3–0
Bristol Rovers	0–0	1–1	1–1	1–0	3–0		2–1	2–1	2–1	1–1	2–0	2–2	0–0	1–1	4–2	3–2	3–0	0–0	2–0	1–0	2–0	2–0	2–0	6–1
Bury	0–0	2–0	2–0	0–2	1–1	0–0		2–0	1–0	0–3	0–0	6–0	2–0	3–0	1–0	3–2	1–2	4–0	1–1	0–0	3–2	1–2	0–2	2–2
Cardiff City	0–1	2–2	0–2	2–2	0–3	1–1	3–1		1–1	0–0	3–3	1–5	1–1	1–0	2–3	1–3	3–0	3–2	2–0	0–1	0–2	0–0	3–1	1–1
Chester	4–0	2–0	2–0	1–1	0–3	0–0	1–4	1–0		2–1	0–2	2–1	1–0	0–2	0–1	3–3	3–1	1–1	2–0	1–0	1–0	2–2	1–1	0–0
Crewe Alexandra	0–2	2–0	2–2	2–3	0–1	1–0	2–1	1–1	0–0		2–3	3–0	0–1	2–1	2–1	1–0	1–0	1–1	0–0	1–1	1–1	2–2	3–1	3–2
Fulham	1–2	0–0	2–2	1–0	0–1	1–2	2–2	2–5	1–0	1–1		0–0	1–2	1–0	1–1	5–2	3–1	1–2	1–1	2–1	2–0	1–2	0–0	4–0
Huddersfield Town	1–2	2–2	1–1	1–0	2–1	1–1	2–1	2–3	4–1	0–1	0–1		2–0	1–0	2–2	1–2	0–2	0–1	2–1	1–1	1–0	1–0	1–0	2–0
Leyton Orient	1–2	2–0	0–0	0–1	1–1	0–1	2–3	3–1	0–3	2–1	1–1	1–0		3–1	1–1	0–1	3–1	4–1	1–1	1–0	0–2	0–1	1–1	1–0
Mansfield Town	5–2	0–3	0–1	2–3	1–0	0–1	1–0	1–0	1–0	2–1	3–0	1–2	1–0		1–2	1–3	2–2	1–1	3–1	2–1	4–0	1–0	0–2	1–0
Northampton Town	2–2	4–2	0–2	0–2	2–0	1–2	0–1	1–1	1–0	3–1	2–2	1–0	0–1	1–2		0–0	1–2	2–1	1–2	2–1	1–1	0–4	1–1	1–1
Notts County	3–2	0–1	2–1	3–1	0–0	3–1	0–4	2–1	0–0	2–0	2–0	1–0	1–0	4–2	3–2		2–1	0–0	2–0	4–0	2–1	1–0	2–0	1–1
Preston North End	2–2	2–1	1–4	4–2	2–2	0–1	2–3	4–0	5–0	0–0	1–0	3–3	0–3	4–0	0–0	2–4		1–0	0–1	2–1	2–0	2–2	2–0	1–1
Reading	0–2	1–1	2–0	1–0	1–1	0–1	1–0	0–1	1–1	1–1	3–2	0–0	1–1	1–0	3–2	1–1	6–0		3–2	3–3	1–1	1–0	0–1	2–0
Rotherham United	5–1	1–1	1–0	2–1	1–2	3–2	1–3	4–0	5–0	1–3	2–1	0–0	5–2	0–0	2–0	1–2	3–1	1–1		4–2	3–2	0–0	2–2	1–2
Shrewsbury Town	2–0	1–1	3–3	1–0	0–1	2–3	3–1	0–0	2–0	0–0	2–0	3–3	4–2	0–1	2–0	2–2	2–0	1–1	1–1		1–1	3–1	2–0	1–3
Swansea City	1–1	0–0	0–0	2–1	0–5	0–0	0–1	0–1	2–1	3–2	4–2	1–3	0–1	1–0	1–1	0–0	2–1	1–6	1–0	0–1		1–0	2–0	3–0
Tranmere Rovers	5–1	4–2	1–3	2–2	6–0	1–2	2–4	3–0	0–0	1–1	2–1	4–0	3–0	1–1	0–0	2–0	2–1	3–1	2–1	3–1	3–0		2–1	2–0
Walsall	0–1	1–1	2–1	2–1	0–2	1–2	2–2	0–2	1–1	1–1	0–0	2–3	1–3	1–0	1–0	2–2	1–0	1–1	1–1	0–2	0–1	2–1		1–2
Wigan Athletic	1–0	1–1	2–0	2–1	2–3	1–2	0–0	1–1	1–0	1–0	2–1	1–2	0–2	4–0	0–0	1–1	0–1	3–1	0–3	0–0	2–0	1–3	3–0	

Legend: Blue = home team win; Yellow = draw; Red = away team win.

=== Third Division play-offs ===
The semifinals were decided over two legs. The final consisted of only a single match.
The full results can be found at: Football League Division Three play-offs 1990.

Semifinals; 1st leg – 13 May; 2nd leg – 16 May 1990
3rd	Notts County	1	2	3
6th	Bolton Wanderers	1	0	1
4th	Tranmere Rovers	0	2	2
5th	Bury	0	0	0

Final at Wembley; 27 May 1990
3rd	Notts County	2
4th	Tranmere Rovers	0

=== Third Division maps ===
Locations of the Football League Third Division teams 1989–1990
Locations of the Football League Third Division London teams 1989–1990

== Fourth Division ==
Exeter City clinched the Fourth Division title to end their six-year spell in the league's basement division. They were joined by Southend United, relegated the previous season, and by a Grimsby Town side who had spent two seasons in the Fourth Division since their most recent relegation. The final promotion place went to playoff winners Cambridge United, who triumphed 1–0 over Chesterfield in their first professional Wembley final with a goal from promising young striker Dion Dublin. Losing semi-finalists in the playoffs were newly promoted Maidstone United, and a Stockport County side whose striker Brett Angell was the division's top scorer on 23 league goals.

Colchester United, who had managed a remarkable escape from relegation the previous season under inspirational new manager Jock Wallace, were unable to escape the drop this time, going down after 40 years in the Football League and being replaced by a Darlington side who had dropped out of the league 12 months before.

Football League, Fourth Division
- Season: 1989–90
- Champions: Exeter City (1st title)
- Promoted: Cambridge United, Grimsby Town, Southend United
- Relegated to Conference: Colchester United
- New club in the league: Maidstone United
- Matches: 552
- Goals: 1,426 (2.58 per match)
- Top goalscorer: Brett Angell (Stockport County), 23

Pos	Team	Pld	W	D	L	GF	GA	GD	Pts	Promotion or relegation
1	Exeter City (C, P)	46	28	5	13	83	48	+35	89	Promotion to the Third Division
2	Grimsby Town (P)	46	22	13	11	70	47	+23	79	Promotion to the Third Division
3	Southend United (P)	46	22	9	15	61	48	+13	75	Promotion to the Third Division
4	Stockport County	46	21	11	14	68	62	+6	74	Qualification for the Fourth Division play-offs
5	Maidstone United	46	22	7	17	77	61	+16	73	Qualification for the Fourth Division play-offs
6	Cambridge United (O, P)	46	21	10	15	76	66	+10	73	Qualification for the Fourth Division play-offs
7	Chesterfield	46	19	14	13	63	50	+13	71	Qualification for the Fourth Division play-offs
8	Carlisle United	46	21	8	17	61	60	+1	71	
9	Peterborough United	46	17	17	12	59	46	+13	68	
10	Lincoln City	46	18	14	14	48	48	0	68	
11	Scunthorpe United	46	17	15	14	69	54	+15	66	
12	Rochdale	46	20	6	20	52	55	−3	66	
13	York City	46	16	16	14	55	53	+2	64	
14	Gillingham	46	17	11	18	46	48	−2	62	
15	Torquay United	46	15	12	19	53	66	−13	57	
16	Burnley	46	14	14	18	45	55	−10	56	
17	Hereford United	46	15	10	21	56	62	−6	55	
18	Scarborough	46	15	10	21	60	73	−13	55	
19	Hartlepool United	46	15	10	21	66	88	−22	55	
20	Doncaster Rovers	46	14	9	23	53	60	−7	51	
21	Wrexham	46	13	12	21	51	67	−16	51	Qualification for the European Cup Winners' Cup first round (Note: Wrexham were runners-up in the Welsh Cup final, and since winners Hereford United are an English club, Wrexham were awarded the right to participate in the Cup Winners' Cup.)
22	Aldershot	46	12	14	20	49	69	−20	50	
23	Halifax Town	46	12	13	21	57	65	−8	49	
24	Colchester United (R)	46	11	10	25	48	75	−27	43	Relegation to the Football Conference

(C) Champions; (O) Play-off winners; (P) Promoted; (R) Relegated

=== Fourth Division results ===
Home \ Away	ALD	BUR	CAM	CRL	CHF	COL	DON	EXE	GIL	GRI	HAL	HAR	HER	LIN	MDS	PET	ROC	SCA	SCU	STD	STP	TOR	WRE	YOR
Aldershot		1–1	0–2	1–0	0–0	4–0	1–1	0–1	1–0	0–0	2–0	6–1	0–2	0–1	0–2	0–1	1–1	1–1	4–2	0–5	2–1	1–2	1–0	2–2
Burnley	0–0		1–3	2–1	0–0	0–0	0–1	1–0	1–2	1–1	1–0	0–0	3–1	0–0	1–1	1–2	0–1	3–0	0–1	0–0	0–0	1–0	2–3	1–1
Cambridge United	2–2	0–1		1–2	0–1	4–0	1–0	3–2	2–1	2–0	1–0	2–1	0–1	2–1	2–0	3–2	0–3	5–2	5–3	2–1	0–2	5–2	1–1	2–2
Carlisle United	1–3	1–1	3–1		4–3	1–0	1–0	1–0	3–0	1–1	1–1	1–0	2–1	1–2	3–2	0–0	0–1	3–1	0–1	3–0	3–1	2–0	1–0	2–1
Chesterfield	2–0	0–1	1–1	3–0		1–1	0–1	2–1	2–0	2–0	4–3	3–1	2–1	0–0	3–1	1–1	2–1	2–2	1–1	1–1	1–1	5–1	3–0	0–0
Colchester United	1–0	1–2	1–2	4–0	1–0		2–0	0–1	2–0	1–0	2–2	3–1	1–1	0–1	4–1	0–1	1–2	0–0	1–0	0–2	0–1	0–3	1–3	0–2
Doncaster Rovers	0–1	2–3	2–1	1–1	1–0	2–0		2–1	0–0	0–0	3–4	2–2	0–1	0–1	1–1	0–3	4–0	1–1	1–2	0–1	2–1	2–1	2–2	1–2
Exeter City	2–0	2–1	3–2	0–0	2–1	2–1	1–0		3–1	2–1	2–0	3–1	2–0	3–0	2–0	2–0	5–0	3–2	1–0	2–1	1–1	3–0	1–1	3–1
Gillingham	0–0	0–0	1–0	2–1	3–0	3–3	3–1	1–1		1–2	3–1	0–0	0–1	1–1	1–2	0–0	1–0	2–0	0–3	5–0	0–3	0–2	1–0	0–0
Grimsby Town	2–1	4–2	0–0	1–0	0–1	4–1	2–1	1–0	2–0		1–1	0–0	0–2	1–0	2–3	1–2	1–2	3–0	2–1	2–0	4–2	0–0	5–1	3–0
Halifax Town	4–2	0–0	0–0	1–1	1–1	1–1	0–2	1–2	0–1	2–2		4–0	1–1	0–1	1–2	2–2	1–0	1–2	0–1	1–2	1–2	3–1	4–2	2–2
Hartlepool United	2–0	3–0	1–2	1–0	3–1	0–2	0–6	0–3	1–2	4–2	2–0		1–2	1–1	4–2	2–2	2–1	4–1	3–2	1–1	5–0	1–1	3–0	1–2
Hereford United	4–1	0–1	0–2	2–2	3–2	2–0	0–1	2–1	1–2	0–1	0–1	4–1		2–2	3–0	1–2	1–3	3–1	1–2	0–3	1–2	0–0	0–0	1–2
Lincoln City	0–1	1–0	4–3	1–3	1–1	2–1	2–1	1–5	1–3	1–1	2–1	4–1	1–0		1–2	1–0	1–2	0–0	1–0	2–0	0–0	2–2	1–0	0–0
Maidstone United	5–1	1–2	2–2	5–2	0–1	4–1	1–0	1–0	0–1	2–2	1–2	4–2	2–0	2–0		1–1	2–0	4–1	1–1	3–0	0–1	5–1	2–0	1–0
Peterborough United	1–1	4–1	1–2	3–0	1–1	1–0	2–1	4–3	1–1	1–1	3–0	0–2	1–1	1–0	1–0		0–1	1–2	1–1	1–2	2–0	1–1	3–1	1–1
Rochdale	2–0	2–1	2–0	1–2	1–0	2–2	1–3	1–0	1–0	0–1	0–2	0–0	5–2	1–0	3–2	1–2		1–0	3–0	0–1	1–1	0–0	0–3	0–1
Scarborough	1–0	4–2	1–1	2–1	2–3	2–2	1–2	1–2	0–1	3–1	2–3	4–1	0–1	2–0	0–1	2–1	2–1		0–0	1–1	2–0	0–0	2–1	1–3
Scunthorpe United	3–2	3–0	1–1	2–3	0–1	4–0	4–1	5–4	0–0	2–2	1–1	0–1	3–3	1–1	1–0	0–0	0–1	0–1		1–1	5–0	2–0	3–1	1–1
Southend United	5–0	3–2	0–0	2–0	0–2	0–2	2–0	1–2	2–0	0–2	2–0	3–0	2–0	2–0	0–1	0–0	3–2	1–0	0–0		2–0	1–0	2–1	2–0
Stockport County	1–1	3–1	3–1	3–1	3–1	1–1	3–1	2–1	1–0	2–4	0–1	6–0	2–1	1–1	1–2	0–0	2–1	3–2	4–2	1–0		1–1	0–2	2–2
Torquay United	1–2	0–1	3–0	1–2	1–0	4–1	2–0	0–2	0–2	0–3	1–0	4–3	1–1	0–3	2–1	2–1	1–0	3–2	0–3	3–0	3–0		0–1	1–1
Wrexham	2–2	1–0	2–3	1–0	0–2	3–2	0–0	1–1	2–1	0–1	2–1	1–2	0–0	0–2	4–2	2–1	1–1	0–2	0–0	3–3	0–1	1–1		2–0
York City	2–2	1–3	4–2	0–1	4–0	3–1	2–1	3–0	1–0	0–1	0–2	1–1	1–2	0–0	0–0	1–0	1–0	1–2	0–1	2–1	0–3	1–1	1–0	

Legend: Blue = home team win; Yellow = draw; Red = away team win.

=== Fourth Division play-offs ===
The semifinals were decided over two legs. The final consisted of only a single match.
The full results can be found at: Football League Division Four play-offs 1990.

Semifinals; 1st leg –13 May; 2nd leg –16 May 1990
4th	Stockport County	0	0	0
7th	Chesterfield	4	2	6
5th	Maidstone United (1897)	1	0	1
6th	Cambridge United	1	2	3

Final at Wembley; 26 May 1990
7th	Chesterfield	0
6th	Cambridge United	1

=== Fourth Division maps ===
Locations of the Football League Fourth Division teams 1989–1990

== Attendances ==
=== Barclays League Division One ===
#	Football club	Average attendance
1	Manchester United	39,077
2	Liverpool FC	36,589
3	Arsenal FC	33,713
4	Manchester City FC	27,975
5	Tottenham Hotspur FC	26,831
6	Everton FC	26,280
7	Aston Villa FC	25,544
8	Chelsea FC	21,531
9	Sheffield Wednesday FC	20,930
10	Nottingham Forest FC	20,606
11	Derby County FC	17,426
12	Crystal Palace FC	17,105
13	Norwich City FC	16,737
14	Southampton FC	16,463
15	Coventry City FC	14,312
16	Queens Park Rangers FC	13,218
17	Millwall FC	12,413
18	Charlton Athletic FC	10,748
19	Luton Town FC	9,886
20	Wimbledon FC	7,756

=== Barclays League Division Two ===
#	Football club	Average attendance
1	Leeds United FC	28,568
2	Newcastle United FC	21,590
3	West Ham United FC	20,311
4	Sunderland AFC	17,987
5	Wolverhampton Wanderers FC	17,045
6	Sheffield United FC	16,989
7	Middlesbrough FC	16,971
8	Ipswich Town FC	12,913
9	Stoke City FC	12,449
10	Leicester City FC	11,716
11	West Bromwich Albion FC	11,308
12	Watford FC	10,353
13	Oldham Athletic FC	9,727
14	Blackburn Rovers FC	9,624
15	Swindon Town FC	9,395
16	Barnsley FC	9,033
17	Port Vale FC	8,978
18	Portsmouth FC	8,959
19	Bradford City AFC	8,777
20	Plymouth Argyle FC	8,749
21	Brighton & Hove Albion FC	8,679
22	AFC Bournemouth	7,454
23	Hull City AFC	6,518
24	Oxford United FC	5,820

=== Barclays League Division Three ===
#	Football club	Average attendance
1	Bristol City FC	11,544
2	Birmingham City FC	8,558
3	Tranmere Rovers	7,449
4	Bolton Wanderers FC	7,286
5	Preston North End FC	6,313
6	Bristol Rovers FC	6,202
7	Notts County FC	6,151
8	Brentford FC	5,662
9	Huddersfield Town AFC	5,630
10	Rotherham United FC	5,612
11	Fulham FC	4,484
12	Leyton Orient FC	4,365
13	Swansea City AFC	4,223
14	Walsall FC	4,077
15	Blackpool FC	4,075
16	Reading FC	4,060
17	Crewe Alexandra FC	4,008
18	Cardiff City FC	3,642
19	Shrewsbury Town FC	3,521
20	Bury FC	3,450
21	Northampton Town FC	3,190
22	Mansfield Town FC	3,129
23	Wigan Athletic FC	2,758
24	Chester City FC	2,506

=== Barclays League Division Four ===
#	Football club	Average attendance
1	Burnley FC	6,222
2	Grimsby Town FC	5,984
3	Exeter City FC	4,859
4	Peterborough United FC	4,804
5	Carlisle United FC	4,740
6	Chesterfield FC	4,181
7	Lincoln City FC	4,071
8	Stockport County FC	3,899
9	Gillingham FC	3,887
10	Southend United FC	3,836
11	Scunthorpe United FC	3,524
12	Cambridge United FC	3,359
13	Colchester United FC	3,150
14	Doncaster Rovers FC	2,706
15	Hereford United FC	2,676
16	York City FC	2,615
17	Hartlepool United FC	2,503
18	Maidstone United FC	2,427
19	Wrexham AFC	2,368
20	Scarborough FC	2,325
21	Torquay United FC	2,147
22	Rochdale AFC	2,027
23	Aldershot Town FC	2,022
24	Halifax Town AFC	1,895

== See also ==
- 1989–90 in English football
