= 1987–88 Football League =

89th season of the Football League

The Football League
- Season: 1987–88
- Champions: Liverpool
- Relegated: Newport County
- New club in League: Scarborough

The 1987–88 season was the 89th completed season of The Football League.

== Final league tables and results ==
The tables and results below are reproduced here in the exact form that they can be found at The Rec.Sport.Soccer Statistics Foundation website, with home and away statistics separated.

== First Division ==
First Division
- Season: 1987–88
- Champions: Liverpool; 17th English title
- Relegated: Chelsea; Portsmouth; Watford; Oxford United
- Matches: 420
- Goals: 1,049 (2.5 per match)
- Top goalscorer: John Aldridge (26 goals)

Liverpool won the league title by nine points, and with only two defeats all season. Second in the league were Manchester United.

The automatically relegated sides were Watford, Oxford United and Portsmouth. Chelsea were subsequently relegated as well after losing to Middlesbrough in the playoff final.

=== Final table ===
Pos	Team	Pld	W	D	L	GF	GA	GD	Pts	Qualification or relegation
1	Liverpool (C)	40	26	12	2	87	24	+63	90	Qualified for the Football League Centenary Trophy and disqualified from the European Cup
2	Manchester United	40	23	12	5	71	38	+33	81	Qualified for the Football League Centenary Trophy and disqualified from UEFA Cup
3	Nottingham Forest	40	20	13	7	67	39	+28	73	Qualified for the Football League Centenary Trophy
4	Everton	40	19	13	8	53	27	+26	70	Qualified for the Football League Centenary Trophy
5	Queens Park Rangers	40	19	10	11	48	38	+10	67	Qualified for the Football League Centenary Trophy
6	Arsenal	40	18	12	10	58	39	+19	66	Qualified for the Football League Centenary Trophy
7	Wimbledon (Note: Wimbledon would have qualified as FA Cup winners.)	40	14	15	11	58	47	+11	57	Qualified for the Football League Centenary Trophy and disqualified from the European Cup Winners' Cup
8	Newcastle United	40	14	14	12	55	53	+2	56	Qualified for the Football League Centenary Trophy
9	Luton Town (Note: Luton Town would have qualified as League Cup winners.)	40	14	11	15	57	58	−1	53	Disqualified from the UEFA Cup
10	Coventry City	40	13	14	13	46	53	−7	53	
11	Sheffield Wednesday	40	15	8	17	52	66	−14	53	
12	Southampton	40	12	14	14	49	53	−4	50	
13	Tottenham Hotspur	40	12	11	17	38	48	−10	47	
14	Norwich City	40	12	9	19	40	52	−12	45	
15	Derby County	40	10	13	17	35	45	−10	43	
16	West Ham United	40	9	15	16	40	52	−12	42	
17	Charlton Athletic	40	9	15	16	38	52	−14	42	
18	Chelsea (R)	40	9	15	16	50	68	−18	42	Qualified for Second Division play-offs
19	Portsmouth (R)	40	7	14	19	36	66	−30	35	Relegated to Second Division
20	Watford (R)	40	7	11	22	27	51	−24	32	Relegated to Second Division
21	Oxford United (R)	40	6	13	21	44	80	−36	31	Relegated to Second Division

Source: World Football
Rules for classification: 1) Points; 2) Goal difference; 3) Goals scored
(C) Champions; (R) Relegated

== Results ==
Home \ Away	ARS	CHA	CHE	COV	DER	EVE	LIV	LUT	MUN	NEW	NWC	NOT	OXF	POR	QPR	SHW	SOU	TOT	WAT	WHU	WDN
Arsenal		4–0	3–1	1–1	2–1	1–1	1–2	2–1	1–2	1–1	2–0	0–2	2–0	6–0	0–0	3–1	0–1	2–1	0–1	1–0	3–0
Charlton Athletic	0–3		2–2	2–2	0–1	0–0	0–2	1–0	1–3	2–0	2–0	1–2	0–0	2–1	0–1	3–1	1–1	1–1	1–0	3–0	1–1
Chelsea	1–1	1–1		1–0	1–0	0–0	1–1	3–0	1–2	2–2	1–0	4–3	2–1	0–0	1–1	2–1	0–1	0–0	1–1	1–1	1–1
Coventry City	0–0	0–0	3–3		0–3	1–2	1–4	4–0	0–0	1–3	0–0	0–3	1–0	1–0	0–0	3–0	2–3	2–1	1–0	0–0	3–3
Derby County	0–0	1–1	2–0	2–0		0–0	1–1	1–0	1–2	2–1	1–2	0–1	0–1	0–0	0–2	2–2	2–0	1–2	1–1	1–0	0–1
Everton	1–2	1–1	4–1	1–2	3–0		1–0	2–0	2–1	1–0	1–0	1–0	0–0	2–1	2–0	4–0	1–0	0–0	2–0	3–1	2–2
Liverpool	2–0	3–2	2–1	4–0	4–0	2–0		1–1	3–3	4–0	0–0	5–0	2–0	4–0	4–0	1–0	1–1	1–0	4–0	0–0	2–1
Luton Town	1–1	1–0	3–0	0–1	1–0	2–1	0–1		1–1	4–0	1–2	1–1	7–4	4–1	2–1	2–2	2–2	2–0	2–1	2–2	2–0
Manchester United	0–0	0–0	3–1	1–0	4–1	2–1	1–1	3–0		2–2	2–1	2–2	3–1	4–1	2–1	4–1	0–2	1–0	2–0	3–1	2–1
Newcastle United	0–1	2–1	3–1	2–2	0–0	1–1	1–4	4–0	1–0		1–3	0–1	3–1	1–1	1–1	2–2	2–1	2–0	3–0	2–1	1–2
Norwich City	2–4	2–0	3–0	3–1	1–2	0–3	0–0	2–2	1–0	1–1		0–2	4–2	0–1	1–1	0–3	0–1	2–1	0–0	4–1	0–1
Nottingham Forest	0–1	2–2	3–2	4–1	2–1	0–0	2–1	1–1	0–0	0–2	2–0		5–3	5–0	4–0	3–0	3–3	3–0	1–0	0–0	0–0
Oxford United	0–0	2–1	4–4	1–0	0–0	1–1	0–3	2–5	0–2	1–3	3–0	0–2		4–2	2–0	0–3	0–0	0–0	1–1	1–2	2–5
Portsmouth	1–1	1–1	0–3	0–0	2–1	0–1	0–2	3–1	1–2	1–2	2–2	0–1	2–2		0–1	1–2	2–2	0–0	1–1	2–1	2–1
Queens Park Rangers	2–0	2–0	3–1	1–2	1–1	1–0	0–1	2–0	0–2	1–1	3–0	2–1	3–2	2–1		1–1	3–0	2–0	0–0	0–1	1–0
Sheffield Wednesday	3–3	2–0	3–0	0–3	2–1	1–0	1–5	0–2	2–4	0–1	1–0	0–1	1–1	1–0	3–1		2–1	0–3	2–3	2–1	1–0
Southampton	4–2	0–1	3–0	1–2	1–2	0–4	2–2	1–1	2–2	1–1	0–0	1–1	3–0	0–2	0–1	1–1		2–1	1–0	2–1	2–2
Tottenham Hotspur	1–2	0–1	1–0	2–2	0–0	2–1	0–2	2–1	1–1	3–1	1–3	1–1	3–0	0–1	1–1	2–0	2–1		2–1	2–1	0–3
Watford	2–0	2–1	0–3	0–1	1–1	1–2	1–4	0–1	0–1	1–1	0–1	0–0	3–0	0–0	0–1	1–3	0–1	1–1		1–2	1–0
West Ham United	0–1	1–1	4–1	1–1	1–1	0–0	1–1	1–1	1–1	2–1	2–0	3–2	1–1	1–1	0–3	0–1	2–1	0–1	1–0		1–2
Wimbledon	3–1	4–1	2–2	1–2	2–1	1–1	1–1	2–0	2–1	0–0	1–0	1–1	1–1	2–2	1–2	1–1	2–0	3–0	1–2	1–1	

Legend: Blue = home team win; Yellow = draw; Red = away team win.

=== Managerial changes ===
Team	Outgoing manager	Manner of departure	Date of vacancy	Position in table	Incoming manager	Date of appointment
Watford	(England) Graham Taylor	Signed by Aston Villa	27 May 1987	Pre-season	(England) Dave Bassett	18 June 1987
Everton	(England) Howard Kendall	Signed by Athletic Bilbao	18 June 1987	Pre-season	(England) Colin Harvey	18 June 1987
Wimbledon	(England) Dave Bassett	Signed by Watford	18 June 1987	Pre-season	(England) Bobby Gould	25 June 1987
Luton Town	(Scotland) John Moore	Resigned	20 June 1987	Pre-season	(England) Ray Harford	22 June 1987
Tottenham Hotspur	(England) David Pleat	Resigned	23 October 1987	7th	(England) Trevor Hartley (caretaker)	23 October 1987
Norwich City	(England) Ken Brown	Sacked	9 November 1987	19th	(England) Dave Stringer	9 November 1987
Tottenham Hotspur	(England) Trevor Hartley	End of caretaker spell	28 November 1987	11th	(England) Terry Venables	28 November 1987
Watford	(England) Dave Bassett	Sacked	11 January 1988	21st	(England) Steve Harrison	15 January 1988
Chelsea	(England) John Hollins	Sacked	6 March 1988	16th	(England) Bobby Campbell	6 March 1988
Oxford United	(England) Maurice Evans	Resigned	18 March 1988	20th	(Republic of Ireland) Mark Lawrenson	19 March 1988

=== First Division maps ===
Locations of the Football League First Division London teams 1987–1988
Locations of the Football League First Division 1987–1988 teams

== Second Division ==
Second Division
- Season: 1987–88
- Champions: Millwall
- Promoted: Millwall; Aston Villa; Middlesbrough
- Relegated: Sheffield United; Reading; Huddersfield Town
- Matches: 506
- Goals: 1,389 (2.75 per match)
- Biggest home win: Manchester City 10–1 Huddersfield Town (7 November 1987)
- Biggest away win: Sheffield United 0–5 Oldham Athletic (2 January 1988)
- Highest scoring: Manchester City 10–1 Huddersfield Town (7 November 1987)

Millwall lifted the Second Division championship trophy and gained promotion to the First Division for the first time in their history. Runners-up were Aston Villa, and Middlesbrough won promotion via play-offs.

Huddersfield Town and Sheffield United were relegated.

Pos	Team	Pld	W	D	L	GF	GA	GD	Pts	Relegation
1	Millwall (C, P)	44	25	7	12	72	52	+20	82	Promotion to the First Division
2	Aston Villa (P)	44	22	12	10	68	41	+27	78	Promotion to the First Division
3	Middlesbrough (O, P)	44	22	12	10	63	36	+27	78	Qualification for the Second Division play-offs
4	Bradford City	44	22	11	11	74	54	+20	77	Qualification for the Second Division play-offs
5	Blackburn Rovers	44	21	14	9	68	52	+16	77	Qualification for the Second Division play-offs
6	Crystal Palace	44	22	9	13	86	59	+27	75	
7	Leeds United	44	19	12	13	61	51	+10	69	
8	Ipswich Town	44	19	9	16	61	52	+9	66	
9	Manchester City	44	19	8	17	80	60	+20	65	
10	Oldham Athletic	44	18	11	15	72	64	+8	65	
11	Stoke City	44	17	11	16	50	57	−7	62	
12	Swindon Town	44	16	11	17	73	60	+13	59	
13	Leicester City	44	16	11	17	62	61	+1	59	
14	Barnsley	44	15	12	17	61	62	−1	57	
15	Hull City	44	14	15	15	54	60	−6	57	
16	Plymouth Argyle	44	16	8	20	65	67	−2	56	
17	Bournemouth	44	13	10	21	56	68	−12	49	
18	Shrewsbury Town	44	11	16	17	42	54	−12	49	
19	Birmingham City	44	11	15	18	41	66	−25	48	
20	West Bromwich Albion	44	12	11	21	50	69	−19	47	
21	Sheffield United (R)	44	13	7	24	45	74	−29	46	Qualification for the Third Division play-offs
22	Reading (R)	44	10	12	22	44	70	−26	42	Relegation to the Third Division
23	Huddersfield Town (R)	44	6	10	28	41	100	−59	28	Relegation to the Third Division

Rules for classification: 1) Points; 2) Goal difference; 3) Goals scored
(C) Champions; (O) Play-off winners; (P) Promoted; (R) Relegated

=== Second Division play-offs ===
The team fourth from bottom of the First Division played off for one place in that division with the teams finishing third, fourth and fifth in the Second Division. In the semi-final, Chelsea of the First Division beat fifth-placed Blackburn Rovers 6–1 on aggregate, and third-placed Middlesbrough beat Bradford City 3–2 on aggregate. The final was also played over two legs. Playing at their Ayresome Park ground in front of a crowd of 25,531, Middlesbrough duly won the first leg 2–0 with goals from Bernie Slaven and Trevor Senior. In the second leg at Stamford Bridge, which was marred by violence perpetrated by some of the 40,550 spectators, Chelsea's Gordon Durie scored the only goal. Thus Middlesbrough won 2–1 on aggregate and were promoted to the First Division for 1988–89, while Chelsea were relegated to the Second.

Semi-finals; 1st leg – 15 May; 2nd leg – 18 May 1988
5	Blackburn Rovers	0	1	1
1D	Chelsea	2	4	6
4	Bradford City	2	0	2
3	Middlesbrough	1	2	3

Final; 1st leg – 25 May; 2nd leg – 28 May 1988
1D	Chelsea	0	1	1
3	Middlesbrough	2	0	2

=== Second Division results ===
Home \ Away	AST	BAR	BIR	BLB	BOU	BRA	CRY	HUD	HUL	IPS	LEE	LEI	MCI	MID	MIL	OLD	PLY	REA	SHU	SHR	STK	SWI	WBA
Aston Villa		0–0	0–2	1–1	1–1	1–0	4–1	1–1	5–0	1–0	1–2	2–1	1–1	0–1	1–2	1–2	5–2	2–1	1–1	1–0	0–1	2–1	0–0
Barnsley	1–3		2–2	0–1	2–1	3–0	2–1	1–0	1–3	2–3	1–1	1–1	3–1	0–3	4–1	1–1	2–1	5–2	1–2	2–1	5–2	0–1	3–1
Birmingham City	1–2	2–0		1–0	1–1	1–1	0–6	2–0	1–1	1–0	0–0	2–2	0–3	0–0	1–0	1–3	0–1	2–2	1–0	0–0	2–0	1–1	0–1
Blackburn Rovers	3–2	0–1	2–0		3–1	1–1	2–0	2–2	2–1	1–0	1–1	3–3	2–1	0–2	2–1	1–0	1–1	1–1	4–1	2–2	2–0	0–0	3–1
Bournemouth	1–2	1–2	4–2	1–1		2–0	2–3	0–2	6–2	1–1	0–0	2–3	0–2	0–0	1–2	2–2	2–2	3–0	1–2	2–0	0–0	2–0	3–2
Bradford City	2–4	1–1	4–0	2–1	2–0		2–0	0–1	2–0	2–3	0–0	4–1	2–4	2–0	3–1	5–3	3–1	3–0	2–0	1–1	1–4	2–0	4–1
Crystal Palace	1–1	3–2	3–0	2–0	3–0	1–1		2–1	2–2	1–2	3–0	2–1	2–0	3–1	1–0	3–1	5–1	2–3	2–1	1–2	2–0	2–1	4–1
Huddersfield Town	0–1	2–2	2–2	1–2	1–2	1–2	2–2		0–2	1–2	0–0	1–0	1–0	1–4	2–1	2–2	2–1	0–2	0–2	0–0	0–3	0–3	1–3
Hull City	2–1	1–2	2–0	2–2	2–1	0–0	2–1	4–0		1–0	3–1	2–2	3–1	0–0	0–1	1–0	1–1	2–2	1–2	1–1	0–0	1–4	1–0
Ipswich Town	1–1	1–0	1–0	0–2	1–2	4–0	2–3	3–0	2–0		1–0	0–2	3–0	4–0	1–1	2–0	1–2	2–1	1–0	2–0	2–0	3–2	1–1
Leeds United	1–3	0–2	4–1	2–2	3–2	2–0	1–0	3–0	0–2	1–0		1–0	2–0	2–0	1–2	1–1	1–0	0–0	5–0	2–1	0–0	4–2	1–0
Leicester City	0–2	0–0	2–0	1–2	0–1	0–2	4–4	3–0	2–1	1–1	3–2		1–0	0–0	1–0	4–1	4–0	1–0	1–0	0–1	1–1	3–2	3–0
Manchester City	0–2	1–1	3–0	1–2	2–0	2–2	1–3	10–1	2–0	2–0	1–2	4–2		1–1	4–0	1–2	2–1	2–0	2–3	1–3	3–0	1–1	4–2
Middlesbrough	2–1	2–0	1–1	1–1	3–0	1–2	2–1	2–0	1–0	3–1	2–0	1–2	2–1		1–1	1–0	3–1	0–0	6–0	4–0	2–0	2–3	2–1
Millwall	2–1	3–1	3–1	1–4	1–2	0–1	1–1	4–1	2–0	2–1	3–1	1–0	0–1	2–1		1–1	3–2	3–0	3–1	4–1	2–0	2–2	2–0
Oldham Athletic	0–1	1–0	1–2	4–2	2–0	0–2	1–0	3–2	1–2	3–1	1–1	2–0	1–1	3–1	0–0		0–1	4–2	3–2	2–2	5–87	4–3	2–1
Plymouth Argyle	1–3	0–0	1–1	3–0	1–2	2–1	1–3	6–1	3–1	0–0	6–3	4–0	3–2	0–1	1–2	1–0		1–3	1–0	2–0	3–0	1–0	3–3
Reading	0–2	2–1	1–1	0–0	0–0	1–1	2–3	3–2	0–0	1–1	0–1	1–2	0–2	0–0	2–3	3–0	0–1		2–1	1–0	0–1	0–1	1–2
Sheffield United	1–1	1–0	0–2	3–1	0–1	1–2	1–1	2–2	2–1	4–1	2–2	2–1	1–2	0–2	1–2	0–5	1–0	4–1		0–1	0–0	1–0	0–0
Shrewsbury Town	1–2	1–1	0–0	1–2	2–1	2–2	2–0	3–1	2–2	0–0	1–0	0–0	0–0	0–1	0–0	2–3	2–1	0–1	2–0		0–3	2–1	0–1
Stoke City	0–0	3–1	3–1	2–1	1–0	1–2	1–1	1–1	1–1	1–2	2–1	2–1	1–3	1–0	1–2	2–2	1–0	4–2	1–0	1–1		1–0	3–0
Swindon Town	0–0	3–0	0–2	1–2	4–2	2–2	2–2	4–1	0–0	4–2	1–2	3–2	3–4	1–1	0–1	2–0	1–1	4–0	2–0	1–1	3–0		2–0
West Bromwich Albion	0–2	2–2	3–1	0–1	3–0	0–1	1–0	3–2	1–1	2–2	1–4	1–1	1–1	0–0	1–4	0–0	1–0	0–1	4–0	2–1	2–0	1–2	

Legend: Blue = home team win; Yellow = draw; Red = away team win.

== Third Division ==
Third Division
- Season: 1987–88
- Champions: Sunderland
- Promoted: Sunderland; Brighton & Hove Albion; Walsall
- Relegated: Rotherham United; Grimsby Town; York City; Doncaster Rovers
- Matches: 552

Sunderland won the Third Division and went back up to the Second Division. They were joined by runners-up Brighton & Hove Albion and playoff winners Walsall. The automatic relegation places were occupied by Grimsby Town, York City and Doncaster Rovers, with Rotherham United relegated after play-offs.

Pos	Team	Pld	W	D	L	GF	GA	GD	Pts	Relegation
1	Sunderland (C, P)	46	27	12	7	92	48	+44	93	Promotion to the Second Division
2	Brighton & Hove Albion (P)	46	23	15	8	69	47	+22	84	Promotion to the Second Division
3	Walsall (O, P)	46	23	13	10	68	50	+18	82	Qualification for the Third Division play-offs
4	Notts County	46	23	12	11	82	49	+33	81	Qualification for the Third Division play-offs
5	Bristol City	46	21	12	13	77	62	+15	75	Qualification for the Third Division play-offs
6	Northampton Town	46	18	19	9	70	51	+19	73	
7	Wigan Athletic	46	20	12	14	70	61	+9	72	
8	Bristol Rovers	46	18	12	16	68	56	+12	66	
9	Fulham	46	19	9	18	69	60	+9	66	
10	Blackpool	46	17	14	15	71	62	+9	65	
11	Port Vale	46	18	11	17	58	56	+2	65	
12	Brentford	46	16	14	16	53	59	−6	62	
13	Gillingham	46	14	17	15	77	61	+16	59	
14	Bury	46	15	14	17	58	57	+1	59	
15	Chester City	46	14	16	16	51	62	−11	58	
16	Preston North End	46	15	13	18	48	59	−11	58	
17	Southend United	46	14	13	19	65	83	−18	55	
18	Chesterfield	46	15	10	21	41	70	−29	55	
19	Mansfield Town	46	14	12	20	48	59	−11	54	
20	Aldershot	46	15	8	23	64	74	−10	53	
21	Rotherham United (R)	46	12	16	18	50	66	−16	52	Qualification for the Fourth Division play-offs
22	Grimsby Town (R)	46	12	14	20	48	58	−10	50	Relegation to the Fourth Division
23	York City (R)	46	8	9	29	48	91	−43	33	Relegation to the Fourth Division
24	Doncaster Rovers (R)	46	8	9	29	40	84	−44	33	Relegation to the Fourth Division

Rules for classification: 1) Points; 2) Goal difference; 3) Goals scored
(C) Champions; (O) Play-off winners; (P) Promoted; (R) Relegated

=== Third Division play-offs ===
Semi-finals; 1st leg – 15 May; 2nd leg – 18 May 1988
21st	Sheffield United (Div 2)	0	1	1
5th	Bristol City	1	1	2
3rd	Walsall	3	1	4
4th	Notts County	1	1	2

Final; 1st leg – 25 May; 2nd leg – 28 May 1988
3rd	Walsall	3	0	3
5th	Bristol City	1	2	3

Replay

30 May 1988

Walsall	4–0	Bristol City
	Report/Soccerbase

Fellows Park, Walsall
Attendance: 13,007

=== Third Division results ===
Home \ Away	ALD	BLP	BRE	B&HA	BRC	BRR	BRY	CHE	CHF	DON	FUL	GIL	GRI	MAN	NOR	NTC	PTV	PNE	ROT	STD	SUN	WAL	WIG	YOR
Aldershot		0–0	4–1	1–4	2–1	3–0	0–2	4–1	2–0	2–1	0–3	6–0	3–2	3–0	4–4	0–2	3–0	0–0	1–3	0–1	3–2	1–1	3–2	1–2
Blackpool	3–2		0–1	1–3	4–2	2–1	5–1	0–1	1–0	4–2	2–1	3–3	3–0	2–0	3–1	1–1	1–2	3–0	3–0	1–1	0–2	1–2	0–0	2–1
Brentford	3–0	2–1		1–1	0–2	1–1	0–3	1–1	2–0	1–1	3–1	2–2	0–2	2–2	0–1	1–0	1–0	2–0	1–1	1–0	0–1	0–0	2–1	1–2
Brighton & Hove Albion	1–1	1–3	2–1		3–2	2–1	2–1	1–0	2–2	2–0	2–0	2–0	0–0	3–1	3–0	1–1	2–0	0–0	1–1	0–0	3–1	2–1	1–0	1–0
Bristol City	2–0	2–1	2–3	5–2		3–3	3–2	2–2	2–1	1–0	4–0	3–3	1–1	1–2	2–2	2–1	1–0	3–1	2–0	3–2	0–1	0–0	4–1	3–2
Bristol Rovers	3–1	2–0	0–0	1–2	1–0		0–0	2–2	2–0	4–0	3–1	2–0	4–2	2–1	0–2	1–1	1–0	1–2	3–1	0–0	4–0	3–0	2–3	2–1
Bury	1–0	3–1	2–2	2–1	1–1	4–1		0–1	2–0	2–1	1–1	2–1	0–2	1–0	0–0	0–1	0–1	4–0	2–2	2–2	2–3	2–2	0–2	0–1
Chester City	4–1	1–1	1–1	2–2	1–0	0–3	4–4		1–1	1–1	1–2	3–1	1–0	0–2	0–5	1–2	1–0	1–0	1–0	1–1	1–2	1–1	1–0	1–0
Chesterfield	1–0	1–1	2–1	0–0	1–4	0–1	1–0	0–0		0–1	1–0	1–4	0–3	3–1	0–2	2–0	1–3	0–0	3–2	3–1	1–1	2–1	0–1	2–1
Doncaster Rovers	0–0	2–1	0–1	0–2	1–2	0–1	1–2	2–2	1–0		2–2	4–2	1–0	0–2	0–2	0–1	1–1	3–2	2–2	0–1	0–2	0–4	3–4	2–0
Fulham	1–2	3–1	2–2	1–2	0–0	3–1	0–1	1–0	1–3	4–0		0–2	5–0	0–0	0–0	0–0	1–2	0–1	3–1	3–1	0–2	2–0	3–2	3–1
Gillingham	2–1	0–0	0–1	1–1	1–1	3–0	3–3	0–1	10–0	3–1	2–2		1–1	0–0	1–2	3–1	0–0	4–0	0–2	8–1	0–0	0–1	0–1	3–1
Grimsby Town	1–1	1–1	0–1	0–1	1–4	0–0	2–0	2–1	1–1	0–0	0–2	2–0		2–3	2–2	0–0	3–1	0–1	2–1	1–3	0–1	0–2	0–2	5–1
Mansfield Town	1–0	0–0	2–1	1–1	2–0	1–0	0–0	1–2	0–1	2–0	0–2	2–2	1–0		3–1	2–2	4–0	0–0	0–1	1–0	0–4	1–3	0–1	2–1
Northampton Town	1–1	3–3	2–1	1–1	3–0	2–1	0–0	2–0	4–0	1–0	3–2	2–1	2–1	2–0		0–1	1–0	0–1	0–0	4–0	0–2	2–2	1–1	0–0
Notts County	2–1	2–3	3–0	1–2	0–1	1–1	3–0	1–0	2–0	2–0	5–1	0–1	0–0	1–1	3–1		1–2	4–2	4–0	6–2	2–1	3–1	4–4	3–0
Port Vale	4–2	0–0	1–0	2–0	1–1	2–1	1–0	1–1	0–1	5–0	0–0	0–0	2–0	1–1	1–1	1–3		3–2	0–0	4–1	0–1	2–1	2–1	2–1
Preston North End	0–2	2–1	1–2	3–0	2–0	3–1	1–0	1–1	0–1	1–2	2–1	1–1	1–3	1–0	0–0	1–2	3–2		0–0	1–1	2–2	1–0	0–1	3–0
Rotherham United	1–0	0–1	2–0	1–0	4–1	1–1	0–1	5–2	1–1	1–0	0–2	1–2	0–0	2–1	2–2	1–1	1–0	2–2		1–1	1–4	0–1	1–1	0–1
Southend United	0–1	4–0	2–3	2–1	2–0	4–2	1–0	2–2	3–0	4–1	0–2	0–0	1–3	2–1	1–1	1–2	3–3	1–2	1–1		1–4	1–1	3–2	3–1
Sunderland	3–1	2–2	2–0	1–0	0–1	1–1	1–1	0–2	3–2	3–1	2–0	2–1	1–1	4–1	3–1	1–1	2–1	1–1	3–0	7–0		1–1	4–1	4–2
Walsall	2–0	3–2	4–2	1–1	1–1	0–0	2–1	1–0	0–0	2–1	0–1	0–0	3–2	2–1	1–0	2–1	2–1	1–0	5–2	2–1	2–2		1–2	2–1
Wigan Athletic	4–0	0–0	1–1	3–3	1–1	1–0	0–2	1–0	1–2	2–1	1–3	1–1	0–1	2–1	2–2	2–1	2–0	2–0	3–0	1–0	2–2	3–1		1–1
York City	2–2	1–3	1–1	0–2	0–1	0–4	1–1	2–0	1–0	1–1	1–3	0–2	0–2	2–2	2–2	3–5	2–3	1–1	1–2	0–3	2–1	1–3	3–1	

Legend: Blue = home team win; Yellow = draw; Red = away team win.

== Fourth Division ==
Wolves ended their two-year tenure in the Fourth Division by finishing top of the table and winning promotion to the Third Division. They also won the Sherpa Van Trophy final by defeating Burnley at Wembley.

Bolton Wanderers, Cardiff City and Swansea City were also promoted.

Newport County were relegated for the second successive season. They were replaced in the Football League by Lincoln City.

Football LeagueFourth Division
- Season: 1987–88
- Champions: Wolverhampton Wanderers
- Promoted: Cardiff City; Bolton Wanderers; Swansea City
- Relegated: Newport County
- New team in League: Scarborough
- Matches: 552

Pos	Team	Pld	W	D	L	GF	GA	GD	Pts	Promotion or relegation
1	Wolverhampton Wanderers (C, P)	46	27	9	10	82	43	+39	90	Promotion to the Third Division
2	Cardiff City (P)	46	24	13	9	66	41	+25	85	Cup Winners' Cup first round and promotion to the Third Division
3	Bolton Wanderers (P)	46	22	12	12	66	42	+24	78	Promotion to the Third Division
4	Scunthorpe United	46	20	17	9	76	51	+25	77	Qualification for the Fourth Division play-offs
5	Torquay United	46	21	14	11	66	41	+25	77	Qualification for the Fourth Division play-offs
6	Swansea City (O, P)	46	20	10	16	62	56	+6	70	Qualification for the Fourth Division play-offs
7	Peterborough United	46	20	10	16	52	53	−1	70	
8	Leyton Orient	46	19	12	15	85	63	+22	69	
9	Colchester United	46	19	10	17	47	51	−4	67	
10	Burnley	46	20	7	19	57	62	−5	67	
11	Wrexham	46	20	6	20	69	58	+11	66	
12	Scarborough	46	17	14	15	56	48	+8	65	
13	Darlington	46	18	11	17	71	69	+2	65	
14	Tranmere Rovers	46	19	9	18	61	53	+8	64 (Note: Tranmere Rovers were deducted two points.)	
15	Cambridge United	46	16	13	17	50	52	−2	61	
16	Hartlepool United	46	15	14	17	50	57	−7	59	
17	Crewe Alexandra	46	13	19	14	57	53	+4	58	
18	Halifax Town	46	14	14	18	54	59	−5	55 (Note: Halifax Town were deducted one point.)	
19	Hereford United	46	14	12	20	41	59	−18	54	
20	Stockport County	46	12	15	19	44	58	−14	51	
21	Rochdale	46	11	15	20	47	76	−29	48	
22	Exeter City	46	11	13	22	53	68	−15	46	
23	Carlisle United	46	12	8	26	57	86	−29	44	
24	Newport County (R)	46	6	7	33	35	105	−70	25	Relegation to the Football Conference

(C) Champions; (O) Play-off winners; (P) Promoted; (R) Relegated

=== Fourth Division play-offs ===
Semi-finals; 1st leg – 15 May; 2nd leg – 18 May 1988
21st	Rotherham United (Div 3)	0	1	1
6th	Swansea City	1	1	2
4th	Scunthorpe United	1	1	2
5th	Torquay United	2	1	3

Finals; 1st leg – 25 May; 2nd leg – 28 May 1988
6th	Swansea City	2	3	5
5th	Torquay United	1	3	4

=== Fourth Division results ===
Home \ Away	BOL	BUR	CAM	CAR	CRL	COL	CRE	DAR	EXE	HAL	HAR	HER	LEY	NPC	PET	ROC	SCA	SCU	STP	SWA	TOR	TRA	WOL	WRE
Bolton Wanderers		2–1	2–2	1–0	5–0	4–0	1–1	1–1	1–0	2–0	1–2	1–0	1–0	6–0	2–0	0–0	3–1	0–0	2–1	1–1	1–2	2–0	1–0	2–0
Burnley	2–1		0–2	1–2	4–3	0–3	0–0	2–1	3–0	3–1	1–0	0–0	2–0	2–0	1–2	4–0	0–1	1–1	1–1	1–0	1–0	1–1	0–3	1–0
Cambridge United	2–2	2–0		0–0	1–2	0–1	4–1	1–0	2–1	2–1	1–1	0–1	2–0	4–0	1–3	1–2	1–0	3–3	2–0	0–3	1–0	1–1	1–1	0–1
Cardiff City	1–0	2–1	4–0		4–2	1–0	2–0	3–1	3–2	0–0	1–1	0–1	1–1	4–0	0–0	1–0	2–0	0–1	0–0	1–0	2–1	3–0	3–2	1–1
Carlisle United	0–2	3–4	2–1	0–0		4–0	0–1	3–3	0–0	1–1	1–3	3–1	1–2	3–1	0–2	2–0	4–0	3–1	2–0	0–1	3–3	3–2	0–1	0–4
Colchester United	3–0	0–1	0–0	2–1	1–0		1–4	2–1	0–2	2–1	0–0	1–0	0–0	0–0	4–1	1–0	1–3	0–3	2–0	2–1	0–1	0–0	0–1	1–2
Crewe Alexandra	2–1	0–1	0–0	0–0	4–1	0–0		3–1	0–0	0–0	1–1	0–0	3–3	2–1	0–1	0–1	1–0	2–2	3–1	2–2	0–1	0–0	0–2	2–0
Darlington	1–0	4–2	0–1	0–0	2–1	2–0	1–0		4–1	4–1	1–1	3–1	2–2	0–2	2–1	2–1	2–1	1–4	1–2	2–0	1–1	0–0	2–2	2–1
Exeter City	1–1	1–2	3–0	0–2	1–1	0–2	3–1	4–1		1–2	1–0	2–2	2–3	3–0	0–1	1–1	1–0	1–1	2–1	3–1	0–1	0–1	2–4	1–1
Halifax Town	0–0	2–1	1–1	0–1	1–1	1–2	1–2	2–2	2–0		3–1	2–1	1–0	3–1	0–0	1–2	2–2	2–2	2–0	3–1	2–3	2–1	2–1	2–0
Hartlepool United	0–0	2–1	2–1	0–1	0–0	3–1	2–1	2–5	3–1	2–1		1–2	2–2	0–0	0–1	1–1	1–0	1–0	1–3	0–2	0–0	1–2	0–0	1–0
Hereford United	0–3	2–1	1–0	1–2	2–0	1–0	1–1	1–0	1–1	2–1	4–2		0–3	4–2	0–1	0–0	1–1	2–3	0–1	0–0	0–0	1–1	1–2	0–2
Leyton Orient	1–2	4–1	0–2	4–1	4–1	0–0	1–1	4–3	2–3	4–1	0–2	4–0		4–1	2–0	8–0	3–1	1–1	1–1	3–0	0–2	3–1	0–2	2–1
Newport County	0–1	0–1	0–0	1–2	1–2	1–2	1–2	2–1	1–1	1–0	2–3	0–0	0–0		0–4	0–1	0–4	1–1	1–2	1–2	3–1	0–3	1–3	2–0
Peterborough United	0–4	5–0	1–0	4–3	1–0	2–0	0–4	1–2	2–1	1–0	0–1	1–2	1–2	3–0		1–1	0–0	1–1	0–0	0–1	0–2	2–1	1–1	1–0
Rochdale	2–2	2–1	2–1	2–2	1–2	1–4	2–2	1–3	0–0	0–0	0–2	3–1	1–3	3–0	1–1		1–1	2–1	0–1	2–3	1–1	0–0	0–1	1–2
Scarborough	4–0	1–0	0–0	1–1	3–1	3–1	2–0	0–1	3–1	1–1	1–1	2–1	3–1	3–1	1–1	2–1		0–0	1–1	2–0	1–2	2–0	2–2	0–2
Scunthorpe United	1–1	1–1	3–2	2–1	1–0	2–2	2–1	1–0	1–1	1–0	3–0	3–0	3–2	3–1	5–0	1–0	0–1		0–0	1–2	2–3	3–0	0–1	3–1
Stockport County	1–2	2–0	0–2	0–1	3–0	1–1	1–1	1–1	2–1	1–0	1–0	0–2	1–2	5–1	0–1	1–1	1–1	1–1		0–2	2–1	1–2	0–2	1–1
Swansea City	1–0	0–0	1–1	2–2	3–1	1–2	2–4	3–0	0–2	1–1	2–1	3–0	3–0	1–2	2–1	0–3	3–0	1–1	1–1		1–1	1–2	1–2	2–1
Torquay United	2–1	1–3	0–1	2–0	1–0	0–0	1–0	0–0	1–1	1–2	1–1	1–0	1–1	6–1	0–0	5–0	0–1	1–2	3–0	0–1		1–0	0–0	6–1
Tranmere Rovers	2–0	0–1	0–1	0–1	3–0	0–2	2–2	2–1	2–1	2–0	3–1	0–1	2–1	4–0	3–1	6–1	1–0	1–3	4–0	1–2	1–1		3–0	1–0
Wolverhampton Wanderers	4–0	3–0	3–0	1–4	3–1	2–0	2–2	5–3	3–0	0–1	2–0	2–0	2–0	2–1	0–1	2–0	0–0	4–1	1–1	2–0	1–2	3–0		0–2
Wrexham	0–1	1–3	3–0	3–0	4–0	0–1	2–1	0–1	3–0	2–2	2–1	0–0	2–2	4–1	3–1	2–3	1–0	2–1	2–1	1–2	2–3	3–0	4–2	

Legend: Blue = home team win; Yellow = draw; Red = away team win.

== Goalscorers ==
The top goalscorers in each division were:

- Division 1 - John Aldridge (26)
- Division 2 - David Currie (28)
- Division 3 - David Crown (26)
- Division 4 - Steve Bull (34)

== Attendances ==
=== First Division ===
#	Football club	Home games	Average attendance
1	Liverpool FC	20	39,683
2	Manchester United	20	39,105
3	Arsenal FC	20	29,903
4	Everton FC	20	27,782
5	Tottenham Hotspur	20	25,921
6	Newcastle United	20	21,038
7	Chelsea FC	20	20,427
8	West Ham United	20	19,822
9	Sheffield Wednesday	20	19,797
10	Nottingham Forest	20	19,273
11	Coventry City	20	17,508
12	Derby County	20	17,280
13	Portsmouth FC	20	15,909
14	Norwich City	20	15,763
15	Watford FC	20	14,536
16	Southampton FC	20	14,536
17	Queens Park Rangers	20	13,141
18	Charlton Athletic	20	8,681
19	Oxford United	20	8,388
20	Luton Town	20	8,157
21	Wimbledon FC	20	8,016

=== Second Division ===
#	Football club	Home games	Average attendance
1	Leeds United	23	20,272
2	Manchester City	23	19,472
3	Aston Villa	23	18,342
4	Middlesbrough FC	23	14,509
5	Bradford City	23	12,906
6	Ipswich Town	23	11,807
7	Plymouth Argyle	23	10,280
8	Sheffield United	23	10,207
9	Leicester City	23	10,157
10	West Bromwich Albion	23	10,107
11	Crystal Palace	23	9,746
12	Stoke City	23	9,607
13	Swindon Town	23	9,542
14	Blackburn Rovers	23	9,503
15	Birmingham City	23	8,579
16	Millwall	23	8,417
17	Hull City	23	8,135
18	AFC Bournemouth	23	7,873
19	Barnsley FC	23	7,683
20	Reading FC	23	6,945
21	Oldham Athletic	23	6,907
22	Huddersfield Town	23	6,841
23	Shrewsbury Town	23	4,945

== See also ==
- 1987–88 in English football
