= Football League Fourth Division =

Former fourth-tier football league in England

- Founded: 1958; 68 years ago
- Folded: 1992; 34 years ago
- Country: England; Wales
- Number of clubs: 24
- Level on pyramid: 4
- Promotion to: Third Division
- Relegation to: Football Conference (1987–92)
- Domestic cup(s): FA Cup; League Cup; Football League Trophy
- Last champions: Burnley (1991–92)
- Most championships: Doncaster Rovers; Peterborough United; Chesterfield (2 titles each)

The Football League Fourth Division was the fourth-highest division in the English football league system from the 1958–59 season until the creation of the Premier League prior to the 1992–93 season. Following the creation of the Premier League, the fourth tier of English football was renamed the Football League Third Division, before being rebranded as Football League Two in 2004.

== History ==
The Fourth Division was created in 1958 alongside a new national Third Division by merging the regionalised Third Division North and Third Division South. The original economic reasons for having the two regional leagues had become less apparent and thus it was decided to create two national leagues at levels three and four. The twelve best teams of each regional league in 1957–58 went into the Third Division, and the rest became founder members of the Fourth Division.

Founder members of Fourth Division were:

- From Third Division North: Barrow, Bradford (Park Avenue), Carlisle United, Chester City, Crewe Alexandra, Darlington, Gateshead, Hartlepools United, Oldham Athletic, Southport, Workington, York City
- From Third Division South: Aldershot, Coventry City, Crystal Palace, Exeter City, Gillingham, Millwall, Northampton Town, Port Vale, Shrewsbury Town, Torquay United, Walsall, Watford

Before 1987, the top four teams were promoted to the Third Division and the bottom four teams were subject to a re-election vote by other league clubs to determine whether they would remain in the league. Automatic relegation to the Conference was introduced in 1987, the same year the fourth promotion place began to be decided through a play-off.

The highest average league attendance in the Fourth Division was 19,092, achieved by Crystal Palace in the 1960/61 season. The highest attendance at an individual match was recorded the same season: 37,774 for the Good Friday game at Selhurst Park between Crystal Palace and Millwall.

== Promotions and relegation ==
Automatic relegation between the Fourth Division and the Conference was introduced for the 1986–87 season.

=== Elections to the Football League ===
| Season | Out from Fourth Division | In from Regional Leagues | Notes |
|---|---|---|---|
| 1959–60 | Gateshead | Peterborough United | Peterborough elected from Midland Football League. |
| 1961–62 | Accrington Stanley | Oxford United | Accrington Stanley went out of business and their record was expunged. Oxford elected from Southern Football League. |
| 1969–70 | Bradford Park Avenue | Cambridge United | Cambridge elected from Southern Football League. |
| 1971–72 | Barrow | Hereford United | Hereford elected from Southern Football League. |
| 1976–77 | Workington | Wimbledon | Wimbledon elected from Southern Football League. |
| 1977–78 | Southport | Wigan Athletic | Wigan elected from Northern Premier League. |

=== Promotions and relegations from Football Conference ===
| Season | Out from Fourth Division | In from Football Conference | Notes |
|---|---|---|---|
| 1986–87 | Lincoln City | Scarborough | Lincoln relegated to Football Conference. |
| 1987–88 | Newport County | Lincoln City | Newport relegated to Football Conference. |
| 1988–89 | Darlington | Maidstone United | Darlington relegated to Football Conference. |
| 1989–90 | Colchester United | Darlington | Colchester relegated to Football Conference. |
| 1990–91 | None | Barnet | Wrexham finished in bottom place but was not relegated due to expansion of the First Division to 22 clubs (Fourth Division was thus expanded to 23 clubs). |
| 1991–92 | Aldershot; Maidstone United | Colchester United | Aldershot resigned from the league before the end of the 1991-92 season, while Maidstone resigned before the 1992–93 season started. This returned the number of clubs to 22, which would start the renamed Third Division in August 1992. |

== Previous League champions ==
See List of winners of English Football League Two and predecessors.

== Play-offs ==
See Football League Two Play-offs.
