= Nottinghamshire derby =

- Location: Nottinghamshire
- Teams: Mansfield Town; Notts County
- First meeting: Notts County 2–0 Mansfield Town (7 October 1937); 1937–38 Third Division South
- Latest meeting: Mansfield Town 1–0 Notts County (3 February 2024); 2023–24 League Two
- Stadiums: Field Mill (Mansfield Town); Meadow Lane (Notts County)

Statistics
- Total meetings: 56 (Official)
- Most wins: Mansfield Town (22)
- All-time record: Mansfield Town: 22; Draw: 15; Notts County: 19

The Nottinghamshire derby is an association football club rivalry between Nottinghamshire based clubs, Mansfield Town and Notts County. Although both these clubs are secondary rivals to each other, as Mansfield Town's primary rivals are Chesterfield due to the 1984-1985 miner's strike and Notts County contest the Nottingham derby with local rivals Nottingham Forest, the rivalry between two clubs is fierce as recently both the clubs have shared same division with each other more than their primary rivals.

On 17 March 2018, ahead of the derby, supporters of the both clubs travelled 17-miles on foot to for Notts County FITC, the charitable wing of the clubs.

The first ever derby was on 7 October 1937, Notts County defeated Mansfield Town 2–0. Since then a total of 56 derbies has been played with Mansfield Town winning 22 times, Notts County winning 19 times and 15 matches were drawn.

== Head-to-head ==
As of 3 February 2024, a total of 56 derbies matches has been played, out of which 44 were league matches and 12 were cup games.

=== Statistics ===
As of 3 February 2024

Competition	Played	Mansfield Town wins	Draws	Notts County wins	Mansfield Town goals	Notts County goals	H2H Lead
League	44	16	13	15	65	55	+1
League Cup	6	3	1	2	11	11	+1
EFL Trophy	6	3	1	2	6	7	+1
Total	56	22	15	19	82	73	+3
Regional
Notts Senior Cup	2	2	0	0	12	1	+2
Total	58	24	15	19	94	74	+5

== List of matches ==
=== League ===
As of 3 February 2024

#	Season	Date	Competition	Home Team	Result	Away Team	Venue	Att.	H2H
1	1937–38	7 October 1937	Third Division South	Notts County	2–0	Mansfield Town	Meadow Lane	13,632	+1
2	1937–38	9 April 1938	Third Division South	Mansfield Town	1–2	Notts County	Field Mill	11,190	+2
3	1938–39	12 November 1938	Third Division South	Mansfield Town	2–0	Notts County	Field Mill	9,852	+1
4	1938–39	18 March 1939	Third Division South	Notts County	1–1	Mansfield Town	Meadow Lane	11,629	+1
5	1946–47	23 November 1946	Third Division South	Mansfield Town	1–0	Notts County	Field Mill	10,889	0
6	1946–47	29 March 1947	Third Division South	Notts County	5–1	Mansfield Town	Meadow Lane	12,157	+1
7	1958–59	27 September 1958	Third Division	Notts County	3–4	Mansfield Town	Meadow Lane	16,510	0
8	1958–59	14 February 1959	Third Division	Mansfield Town	3–0	Notts County	Field Mill	13,376	+1
9	1963–64	16 September 1963	Third Division	Mansfield Town	4–0	Notts County	Field Mill	16,560	+2
10	1963–64	3 October 1963	Third Division	Notts County	1–0	Mansfield Town	Meadow Lane	14,014	+1
11	1971–72	6 November 1971	Third Division	Notts County	2–0	Mansfield Town	Meadow Lane	16,905	0
12	1971–72	26 February 1972	Third Division	Mansfield Town	1–1	Notts County	Field Mill	16,784	0
13	1977–78	29 October 1977	Second Division	Mansfield Town	1–3	Notts County	Field Mill	11,237	+1
14	1977–78	21 March 1978	Second Division	Notts County	1–0	Mansfield Town	Meadow Lane	10,587	+2
15	1986–87	26 December 1986	Second Division	Notts County	0–0	Mansfield Town	Meadow Lane	8,820	+2
16	1986–87	21 April 1987	Second Division	Mansfield Town	1–2	Notts County	Field Mill	6,094	+3
17	1987–88	11 October 1987	Third Division	Notts County	1–1	Mansfield Town	Meadow Lane	8,573	+3
18	1987–88	12 March 1988	Third Division	Mansfield Town	1–1	Notts County	Field Mill	8,002	+3
19	1988–89	1 October 1988	Third Division	Mansfield Town	1–1	Notts County	Field Mill	5,908	+3
20	1988–89	4 February 1989	Third Division	Notts County	2–1	Mansfield Town	Meadow Lane	5,925	+4
21	1989–90	4 November 1989	Third Division	Mansfield Town	1–3	Notts County	Field Mill	6,016	+5
22	1989–90	5 May 1990	Third Division	Notts County	4–2	Mansfield Town	Meadow Lane	6,906	+6
23	1997–98	13 September 1997	Third Division	Notts County	1–0	Mansfield Town	Meadow Lane	6,706	+7
24	1997–98	31 January 1998	Third Division	Mansfield Town	0–2	Notts County	Field Mill	6,786	+8
25	2002–03	9 November 2002	Second Division	Notts County	2–2	Mansfield Town	Meadow Lane	10,302	+8
26	2002–03	8 February 2003	Second Division	Mansfield Town	3–2	Notts County	Field Mill	8,134	+7
27	2004–05	16 October 2004	League Two	Mansfield Town	3–1	Notts County	Field Mill	7,682	+6
28	2004–05	5 February 2005	League Two	Notts County	0–1	Mansfield Town	Meadow Lane	10,005	+5
29	2005–06	29 August 2005	League Two	Mansfield Town	2–3	Notts County	Field Mill	6,444	+6
30	2005–06	4 March 2006	League Two	Notts County	2–2	Mansfield Town	Meadow Lane	9,779	+6
31	2006–07	7 October 2006	League Two	Mansfield Town	2–2	Notts County	Field Mill	6,182	+6
32	2006–07	10 March 2007	League Two	Notts County	0–0	Mansfield Town	Meadow Lane	10,034	+6
33	2007–08	20 October 2007	League Two	Mansfield Town	2–0	Notts County	Field Mill	4,002	+5
34	2007–08	29 March 2008	League Two	Notts County	0–0	Mansfield Town	Meadow Lane	10,027	+5
35	2015–16	14 August 2015	League Two	Notts County	0–2	Mansfield Town	Meadow Lane	10,074	+4
36	2015–16	16 April 2016	League Two	Mansfield Town	5–0	Notts County	Field Mill	6,357	+3
37	2016–17	8 October 2016	League Two	Mansfield Town	3–1	Notts County	Field Mill	5,763	+2
38	2016–17	14 January 2017	League Two	Notts County	0–0	Mansfield Town	Meadow Lane	11,328	+2
39	2017–18	30 September 2017	League Two	Mansfield Town	3–1	Notts County	Field Mill	7,072	+1
40	2017–18	17 March 2018	League Two	Notts County	1–1	Mansfield Town	Meadow Lane	12,563	+1
41	2018–19	8 December 2018	League Two	Mansfield Town	2–0	Notts County	Field Mill	6,604	0
42	2018–19	16 February 2019	League Two	Notts County	1–0	Mansfield Town	Meadow Lane	1,266	+1
43	2023–24	14 October 2023	League Two	Notts County	1–4	Mansfield Town	Meadow Lane	16,638	0
44	2023–24	3 February 2024	League Two	Mansfield Town	1–0	Notts County	Field Mill	8,667	+1

=== Cup ===
#	Season	Date	Competition	Home Team	Result	Away Team	Venue	Round
1	1966–67	24 August 1966	League Cup	Notts County	1–1	Mansfield Town	Meadow Lane	First round
2	1966–67	29 August 1966	League Cup	Mansfield Town	3–0	Notts County	Field Mill	First round replay
3	1969–70	13 August 1969	League Cup	Mansfield Town	3–1	Notts County	Field Mill	First round
4	1985–86	11 March 1986	EFL Trophy	Mansfield Town	1–0	Notts County	Field Mill	Group stage
5	1985–86	20 March 1986	EFL Trophy	Notts County	0–1	Mansfield Town	Meadow Lane	Group stage play-off
6	1988–89	30 August 1988	League Cup	Notts County	5–0	Mansfield Town	Meadow Lane	First round 1st leg
7	1988–89	6 September 1988	League Cup	Mansfield Town	1–0	Notts County	Field Mill	First round 2nd leg
8	1988–89	29 November 1988	EFL Trophy	Mansfield Town	1–1	Notts County	Field Mill	Group stage
9	2001–02	21 August 2001	League Cup	Mansfield Town	3–4	Notts County	Field Mill	First round
10	2014–15	2 September 2014	EFL Trophy	Notts County	2–0	Mansfield Town	Meadow Lane	First round
11	2015–16	1 September 2015	EFL Trophy	Notts County	3–1	Mansfield Town	Meadow Lane	First round
12	2017–18	24 September 2017	EFL Trophy	Notts County	1–2	Mansfield Town	Meadow Lane	Group stage

=== Nottinghamshire Senior Cup ===
#	Season	Round	Home Team	Result	Away Team	Venue
1	1926–27	Final	Mansfield Town	5–1	Notts County	The Lowmoor Ground
2	1930–31	Final	Mansfield Town	7–0	Notts County	Field Mill

== Statistics ==
=== All-time top scorers ===
As of 3 February 2024

Rank	Nation	Player	Club(s)	Years	League	League Cup	EFL Trophy	Overall
1	(England)	Matt Green	Mansfield Town	2011, 2012–2013, 2015–2017	4	0	0	4
2	(England)	Richie Barker	Mansfield Town	2004–2007	3	0	0	3
2	(England)	Mike Edwards	Notts County	2004–2012, 2014–2018	2	0	1	3
2	(Republic of Ireland)	CJ Hamilton	Mansfield Town	2016–2020	2	0	1	3
2	(Australia)	Danny Allsopp	Notts County	1999, 2000–2003	0	3	0	3

=== All-time most appearances ===
As of 3 February 2024

Rank	Nation	Player	Club(s)	Years	League	League Cup	EFL Trophy	Overall
1	(England)	Jon Stead	Notts County	2015–2019	8	0	1	9
1	(England)	Kevin Pilkington	Mansfield Town	2000–2005, 2010–2011	4	1	0	9
1	(England)	Kevin Pilkington	Notts County	2005–2010, 2012–2017	4	0	0	9
3	(England)	Mike Edwards	Notts County	2004–2012, 2014–2018	6	0	2	8
3	(England)	Mal Benning	Mansfield Town	2014–2021	6	0	2	8
5	(Wales)	Gareth Jelleyman	Mansfield Town	2005, 2005–2008	7	0	0	7
5	(Barbados)	Krystian Pearce	Notts County	2007–2008, 2010–2013	0	0	0	7
5	(Barbados)	Krystian Pearce	Mansfield Town	2015–2020	6	0	1	7
5	(England)	Alex Baptiste	Mansfield Town	2002–2008	7	0	0	7
5	(England)	Jake Buxton	Mansfield Town	2002–2008	7	0	0	7

=== Honours ===
Mansfield Town	Competition	Notts County
National
—	Second Division (Second Tier)	3
1	Third Division South/Third Division (Third Tier)	2
1	Fourth Division/Third Division/League Two (Fourth Tier)	3
—	FA Cup	1
1	EFL Trophy	—
3	Aggregate	9
Regional
5	Notts Senior Cup	11
5	Aggregate	11
Continental
—	Anglo-Italian Cup (defunct)	1
—	Aggregate	1
8	Total aggregate	21
