= 1977–78 Football League =

79th season of the Football League

The Football League
- Season: 1977–78
- Champions: Nottingham Forest
- Relegated: Southport
- New Club in League: Wimbledon

The 1977–78 season was the 79th completed season of The Football League. The season began on 20 August 1977 and ended after 42 matches on 4 May 1978.

Brian Clough’s Nottingham Forest side took the First Division by storm, first winning the League Cup on 22 March and then confirming themselves as league champions the following month. They joined a small and exclusive company of clubs who have won the league championship one season after promotion.

Manchester United broke the British transfer fee record on 9 February by paying Leeds United £495,000 for Scottish defender Gordon McQueen.

Bob Latchford was the top goalscorer, winning a £10,000 prize offered by a national newspaper for the first footballer to reach 30 goals in a single season, which had not happened in the First Division since the 1971–72 season and in the Second Division since the 1965–66 season.

West Ham United, Newcastle United and Leicester City were relegated from the First Division.

Bolton Wanderers, Southampton and Tottenham Hotspur were promoted from the Second Division, while Blackpool, Mansfield Town and Hull City were relegated

Wrexham, Cambridge United and Preston North End were promoted from the Third Division, while Portsmouth, Port Vale, Bradford City and Hereford United were relegated.

Wimbledon played their first season in the Football League, replacing Workington. Watford, Southend United, Swansea City and Brentford were promoted, while Southport were not re-elected. Southport was the last club to leave the Football League through the re-election process.

== Final league tables and results ==
The tables and results below are reproduced here in the exact form that they can be found at The Rec.Sport.Soccer Statistics Foundation website and in Rothmans Book of Football League Records 1888–89 to 1978–79 with home and away statistics separated.

During the first five seasons of the league, that is, until the season 1893–94, re-election process concerned the clubs which finished in the bottom four of the league. From the 1894–95 season and until the 1920–21 season the re-election process was required of the clubs which finished in the bottom three of the league. From the 1922–23 season on it was required of the bottom two teams of both Third Division North and Third Division South. Since the Fourth Division was established in the 1958–59 season, the re-election process has concerned the bottom four clubs in that division.

== First Division ==
First Division
- Season: 1977–78
- Champions: Nottingham Forest; 1st English title
- Relegated: West Ham United; Newcastle United; Leicester City
- European Cup: Nottingham Forest; Liverpool (defending champions)
- Cup Winners' Cup: Ipswich Town
- UEFA Cup: Everton; Manchester City; Arsenal; West Bromwich Albion
- Matches: 462
- Goals: 1,231 (2.66 per match)
- Top goalscorer: Bob Latchford (30 goals)
- Biggest home win: Everton 6–0 Coventry City (26 November 1977); Everton 6–0 Chelsea (29 April 1978)
- Biggest away win: Queens Park Rangers 1–5 Everton (8 October 1977); Leicester 0–4 Liverpool (26 November 1977); Manchester United 0–4 Nottingham Forest (17 December 1977); Everton 2–6 Manchester United (26 December 1977); Leicester City 1–5 Everton (15 April 1978)
- Highest scoring: Coventry City 5–4 Norwich City (27 December 1977); Birmingham 4–5 Chelsea (31 December 1977)

Brian Clough became only the third manager in the history of English football to win the top division title with two clubs, when he guided Nottingham Forest to their first ever top division title. It was an incredible achievement for a Forest side who were one of just a few teams to win the First Division title a year after promotion. Forest finished seven points above Liverpool, who retained the European Cup. Everton, Manchester City and Arsenal completed the top five, while West Bromwich Albion finished sixth for the second successive season, qualifying for the UEFA Cup again. An exciting Coventry City side finished in seventh position, narrowly missing-out on UEFA Cup qualification. This was the club's second-highest ever league finish, after their sixth position in 1969–70.

Manchester United dropped to tenth in their first season under new manager Dave Sexton, while Bobby Robson successfully fought off relegation with Ipswich Town and then guided them to their first FA Cup triumph of their history.

Newcastle United, who had finished fifth a year earlier and had been in the First Division for thirteen years, endured a torrid season and went down with Leicester City and West Ham, ending the latter's twenty-year spell in the Division.

Pos	Team	Pld	W	D	L	GF	GA	GD	Pts	Qualification or relegation
1	Nottingham Forest (C)	42	25	14	3	69	24	+45	64	Qualification for the European Cup first round (Note: Liverpool qualified for the European Cup first round as the 1977–78 European Cup winners.)
2	Liverpool	42	24	9	9	65	34	+31	57	Qualification for the European Cup first round
3	Everton	42	22	11	9	76	45	+31	55	Qualification for the UEFA Cup first round
4	Manchester City	42	20	12	10	74	51	+23	52	Qualification for the UEFA Cup first round
5	Arsenal	42	21	10	11	60	37	+23	52	Qualification for the UEFA Cup first round
6	West Bromwich Albion	42	18	14	10	62	53	+9	50	Qualification for the UEFA Cup first round
7	Coventry City	42	18	12	12	75	62	+13	48	
8	Aston Villa	42	18	10	14	57	42	+15	46	
9	Leeds United	42	18	10	14	63	53	+10	46	
10	Manchester United	42	16	10	16	67	63	+4	42	
11	Birmingham City	42	16	9	17	55	60	−5	41	
12	Derby County	42	14	13	15	54	59	−5	41	
13	Norwich City	42	11	18	13	52	66	−14	40	
14	Middlesbrough	42	12	15	15	42	54	−12	39	
15	Wolverhampton Wanderers	42	12	12	18	51	64	−13	36	
16	Chelsea	42	11	14	17	46	69	−23	36	
17	Bristol City	42	11	13	18	49	53	−4	35	
18	Ipswich Town	42	11	13	18	47	61	−14	35	Qualification for the European Cup Winners' Cup first round (Note: Ipswich Town qualified for the European Cup Winners' Cup as the 1977–78 FA Cup winners.)
19	Queens Park Rangers	42	9	15	18	47	64	−17	33	
20	West Ham United (R)	42	12	8	22	52	69	−17	32	Relegation to the Second Division
21	Newcastle United (R)	42	6	10	26	42	78	−36	22	Relegation to the Second Division
22	Leicester City (R)	42	5	12	25	26	70	−44	22	Relegation to the Second Division

Source: World Football
Rules for classification: 1) Points; 2) Goal difference; 3) Goals scored
(C) Champions; (R) Relegated

=== Stats ===
Record

- Most wins: Nottingham Forest (25)
- Fewest losses: Nottingham Forest (3)
- Most goals scored: Everton (76)
- Fewest goals conceded: Nottingham Forest (24)
- Best goal difference ratio: Nottingham Forest (+45)
- Most draws: Norwich City (18)
- Fewest draws: West Ham United (8)
- Most losses: Newcastle United (26)
- Fewest wins: Leicester City (5)
- Fewest goals scored: Leicester City (26)
- Most goals conceded: Newcastle United (78)
- Worst goal difference ratio: Leicester City (-44)

=== Results ===
Home \ Away	ARS	AST	BIR	BRI	CHE	COV	DER	EVE	IPS	LEE	LEI	LIV	MCI	MUN	MID	NEW	NWC	NOT	QPR	WBA	WHU	WOL
Arsenal		0–1	1–1	4–1	3–0	1–1	1–3	1–0	1–0	1–1	2–1	0–0	3–0	3–1	1–0	2–1	0–0	3–0	1–0	4–0	3–0	3–1
Aston Villa	1–0		0–1	1–0	2–0	1–1	0–0	1–2	6–1	3–1	0–0	0–3	1–4	2–1	0–1	2–0	3–0	0–1	1–1	3–0	4–1	2–0
Birmingham City	1–1	1–0		3–0	4–5	1–1	3–1	0–0	0–0	2–3	1–1	0–1	1–4	1–4	1–2	3–0	2–1	0–2	2–1	1–2	3–0	2–1
Bristol City	0–2	1–1	0–1		3–0	1–1	3–1	0–1	2–0	3–2	0–0	1–1	2–2	0–1	4–1	3–1	3–0	1–3	2–2	3–1	3–2	2–3
Chelsea	0–0	0–0	2–0	1–0		1–2	1–1	0–1	5–3	1–2	0–0	3–1	0–0	2–2	0–0	2–2	1–1	1–0	3–1	2–2	2–1	1–1
Coventry City	1–2	2–3	4–0	1–1	5–1		3–1	3–2	1–1	2–2	1–0	1–0	4–2	3–0	2–1	0–0	5–4	0–0	4–1	1–2	1–0	4–0
Derby County	3–0	0–3	1–3	1–0	1–1	4–2		0–1	0–0	2–2	4–1	4–2	2–1	0–1	4–1	1–1	2–2	0–0	2–0	1–1	2–1	3–1
Everton	2–0	1–0	2–1	1–0	6–0	6–0	2–1		1–0	2–0	2–0	0–1	1–1	2–6	3–0	4–4	3–0	1–3	3–3	3–1	2–1	0–0
Ipswich Town	1–0	2–0	5–2	1–0	1–0	1–1	1–2	3–3		0–1	1–0	1–1	1–0	1–2	1–1	2–1	4–0	0–2	3–2	2–2	0–2	1–2
Leeds United	1–3	1–1	1–0	0–2	2–0	2–0	2–0	3–1	2–1		5–1	1–2	2–0	1–1	5–0	0–2	2–2	1–0	3–0	2–2	1–2	2–1
Leicester City	1–1	0–2	1–4	0–0	0–2	1–2	1–1	1–5	2–1	0–0		0–4	0–1	2–3	0–0	3–0	2–2	0–3	0–0	0–1	1–0	1–0
Liverpool	1–0	1–2	2–3	1–1	2–0	2–0	1–0	0–0	2–2	1–0	3–2		4–0	3–1	2–0	2–0	3–0	0–0	1–0	3–0	2–0	1–0
Manchester City	2–1	2–0	3–0	2–0	6–2	3–1	1–1	1–0	2–1	2–3	0–0	3–1		3–1	2–2	4–0	4–0	0–0	2–1	1–3	3–2	0–2
Manchester United	1–2	1–1	1–2	1–1	0–1	2–1	4–0	1–2	0–0	0–1	3–1	2–0	2–2		0–0	3–2	1–0	0–4	3–1	1–1	3–0	3–1
Middlesbrough	0–1	1–0	1–2	2–0	2–0	1–1	3–1	0–0	1–1	2–1	0–1	1–1	0–2	2–1		2–0	2–2	2–2	1–1	1–0	1–2	0–0
Newcastle United	1–2	1–1	1–1	1–1	1–0	1–2	1–2	0–2	0–1	3–2	2–0	0–2	2–2	2–2	2–4		2–2	0–2	0–3	0–3	2–3	4–0
Norwich City	1–0	2–1	1–0	1–0	0–0	1–2	0–0	0–0	1–0	3–0	2–0	2–1	1–3	1–3	1–1	2–1		3–3	1–1	1–1	2–2	2–1
Nottingham Forest	2–0	2–0	0–0	1–0	3–1	2–1	3–0	1–1	4–0	1–1	1–0	1–1	2–1	2–1	4–0	2–0	1–1		1–0	0–0	2–0	2–0
Queens Park Rangers	2–1	1–2	0–0	2–2	1–1	2–1	0–0	1–5	3–3	0–0	3–0	2–0	1–1	2–2	1–0	0–1	2–1	0–2		2–1	1–0	1–3
West Bromwich Albion	1–3	0–3	3–1	2–1	3–0	3–3	1–0	3–1	1–0	1–0	2–0	0–1	0–0	4–0	2–1	2–0	0–0	2–2	2–0		1–0	2–2
West Ham United	2–2	2–2	1–0	1–2	3–1	2–1	3–0	1–1	3–0	0–1	3–2	0–2	0–1	2–1	0–2	1–0	1–3	0–0	2–2	3–3		1–2
Wolverhampton Wanderers	1–1	3–1	0–1	0–0	1–3	1–3	1–2	3–1	0–0	3–1	3–0	1–3	1–1	2–1	0–0	1–0	3–3	2–3	1–0	1–1	2–2	

Updated to match(es) played on unknown. Source: Ian Laschke: Rothmans Book of Football League Records 1888–89 to 1978–79. Macdonald and Jane’s, London & Sydney, 1980.
Legend: Blue = home team win; Yellow = draw; Red = away team win.

=== Managerial changes ===
Team	Outgoing manager	Manner of departure	Date of vacancy	Position in table	Incoming manager	Date of appointment
Middlesbrough	(England) Harold Shepherdson	End of caretaker spell	6 May 1977	Pre-season	(England) John Neal	6 May 1977
Leicester City	(England) Jimmy Bloomfield	Resigned	23 May 1977	Pre-season	(Scotland) Frank McLintock	6 June 1977
West Bromwich Albion	(Republic of Ireland) Johnny Giles	Resigned	26 May 1977	Pre-season	(England) Ronnie Allen	21 June 1977
Chelsea	(Scotland) Eddie McCreadie	Resigned	1 July 1977	Pre-season	(England) Ken Shellito	6 July 1977
Manchester United	(Scotland) Tommy Docherty	Sacked	4 July 1977	Pre-season	(England) Dave Sexton	14 July 1977
Queens Park Rangers	(England) Dave Sexton	Signed by Manchester United	14 July 1977	Pre-season	(England) Frank Sibley	14 July 1977
Birmingham City	(Scotland) Willie Bell	Resigned	5 September 1977	22nd	(England) Alf Ramsey (caretaker)	5 September 1977
Derby County	(England) Colin Murphy	Demoted to coach	17 September 1977	21st	(Scotland) Tommy Docherty	17 September 1977
Newcastle United	(England) Richard Dinnis	Sacked	9 November 1977	22nd	(England) Bill McGarry	18 November 1977
West Bromwich Albion	(England) Ronnie Allen	Resigned	22 December 1977	4th	(England) Ron Atkinson	12 January 1978
Birmingham City	(England) Alf Ramsey	End of caretaker spell	12 March 1978	18th	(England) Jim Smith	12 March 1978
Leicester City	(Scotland) Frank McLintock	Sacked	5 April 1978	22nd	(Scotland) Ian MacFarlane (caretaker)	5 April 1977

=== Maps ===
Locations of the Football League First Division London teams 1977–1978
Locations of the Football League First Division 1977–1978 teams

== Second Division ==
Second Division
- Season: 1977–78
- Champions: Bolton Wanderers
- Promoted: Bolton Wanderers; Southampton; Tottenham Hotspur
- Relegated: Blackpool; Mansfield Town; Hull City
- Matches: 462
- Goals: 1,235 (2.67 per match)
- Top goalscorer: Bob Hatton (22 goals)
- Biggest home win: Tottenham Hotspur 9–0 Bristol Rovers (22 October 1977)
- Biggest away win: Cardiff City 1–6 Sheffield United (3 December 1977)
- Highest scoring: Bolton Wanderers 6–3 Cardiff City (10 December 1977)

Bolton Wanderers ended their 14-year exile from the top flight by clinching the Second Division title in a tight promotion race between the top four teams. Southampton went up as runners-up, while Tottenham clinched the final promotion place following a final day draw with Southampton. Brighton missed out on a First Division place on goal difference, forcing them to prepare for a fresh assault on reaching the First Division for the first time in their history in 1979.

Hull City, Mansfield Town and Blackpool went down to the Third Division.

Pos	Team	Pld	W	D	L	GF	GA	GD	Pts	Relegation
1	Bolton Wanderers (C, P)	42	24	10	8	63	33	+30	58	Promotion to the First Division
2	Southampton (P)	42	22	13	7	70	39	+31	57	Promotion to the First Division
3	Tottenham Hotspur (P)	42	20	16	6	83	49	+34	56	Promotion to the First Division
4	Brighton & Hove Albion	42	22	12	8	63	38	+25	56	
5	Blackburn Rovers	42	16	13	13	56	60	−4	45	
6	Sunderland	42	14	16	12	67	59	+8	44	
7	Stoke City	42	16	10	16	53	49	+4	42	
8	Oldham Athletic	42	13	16	13	54	58	−4	42	
9	Crystal Palace	42	13	15	14	50	47	+3	41	
10	Fulham	42	14	13	15	49	49	0	41	
11	Burnley	42	15	10	17	56	64	−8	40	
12	Sheffield United	42	16	8	18	62	73	−11	40	
13	Luton Town	42	14	10	18	54	52	+2	38	
14	Orient	42	10	18	14	43	49	−6	38	
15	Notts County	42	11	16	15	54	62	−8	38	
16	Millwall	42	12	14	16	49	57	−8	38	
17	Charlton Athletic	42	13	12	17	55	68	−13	38	
18	Bristol Rovers	42	13	12	17	61	77	−16	38	
19	Cardiff City	42	13	12	17	51	71	−20	38	
20	Blackpool (R)	42	12	13	17	59	60	−1	37	Relegation to the Third Division
21	Mansfield Town (R)	42	10	11	21	49	69	−20	31	Relegation to the Third Division
22	Hull City (R)	42	8	12	22	34	52	−18	28	Relegation to the Third Division

Rules for classification: 1) Points; 2) Goal difference; 3) Goals scored
(C) Champions; (P) Promoted; (R) Relegated

=== Results ===
Home \ Away	BLB	BLP	BOL	B&HA	BRR	BUR	CAR	CHA	CRY	FUL	HUL	LUT	MAN	MIL	NTC	OLD	ORI	SHU	SOU	STK	SUN	TOT
Blackburn Rovers		1–2	0–1	0–1	0–1	0–1	3–0	2–1	3–0	4–0	1–1	2–0	3–1	2–1	1–0	4–2	1–0	1–1	2–1	2–1	1–1	0–0
Blackpool	5–2		0–2	0–1	3–1	1–1	3–0	5–1	3–1	1–2	3–0	2–1	1–2	2–2	2–2	1–1	0–0	1–1	0–1	1–1	1–1	0–2
Bolton Wanderers	4–2	2–1		1–1	3–0	1–2	6–3	2–1	2–0	0–0	1–0	2–1	2–0	2–1	2–0	1–0	2–0	2–1	0–0	1–1	2–0	1–0
Brighton & Hove Albion	2–2	2–1	1–2		1–1	2–1	4–0	1–0	1–1	2–0	2–1	3–2	5–1	3–2	2–1	1–1	1–0	2–1	1–1	2–1	2–1	3–1
Bristol Rovers	4–1	2–0	0–1	0–4		2–2	3–2	2–2	3–0	0–0	1–1	1–2	3–1	2–0	2–2	0–0	2–1	4–1	0–0	4–1	3–2	2–3
Burnley	2–3	0–1	0–1	0–0	3–1		4–2	1–0	1–1	2–0	1–1	2–1	2–0	0–2	3–1	4–1	0–0	4–1	3–3	1–0	0–0	2–1
Cardiff City	1–1	2–1	1–0	1–0	1–1	2–1		1–0	2–2	3–1	0–0	1–4	1–1	4–1	2–1	1–0	0–1	1–6	1–0	2–0	5–2	0–0
Charlton Athletic	2–2	3–1	2–1	4–3	3–1	3–2	0–0		1–0	0–1	0–1	0–0	2–2	0–2	0–0	2–2	2–1	3–0	1–3	3–2	3–2	4–1
Crystal Palace	5–0	2–2	2–1	0–0	1–0	1–1	2–0	1–1		2–3	0–1	3–3	3–1	1–0	2–0	0–0	1–0	1–0	1–2	0–1	2–2	1–2
Fulham	0–0	1–1	2–0	2–1	1–1	4–1	1–0	1–1	1–1		2–0	1–0	0–2	0–1	5–1	0–2	1–2	2–0	1–1	3–0	3–3	1–1
Hull City	0–1	2–0	0–0	1–1	0–1	1–3	4–1	0–2	1–0	0–1		1–1	0–2	3–2	1–1	0–1	2–2	2–3	0–3	0–0	3–0	2–0
Luton Town	0–0	4–0	2–1	1–0	1–1	1–2	3–1	7–1	1–0	1–0	1–1		1–1	1–0	2–0	0–1	1–0	4–0	1–2	1–2	1–3	1–4
Mansfield Town	2–2	1–3	0–1	1–2	3–0	4–1	2–2	0–3	1–3	2–1	1–0	3–1		0–0	1–3	0–2	1–1	1–1	1–2	2–1	1–2	3–3
Millwall	1–1	2–0	1–0	0–1	1–3	1–1	1–1	1–1	0–3	0–3	1–1	1–0	1–0		0–0	2–0	2–0	1–1	3–0	0–0	3–1	1–3
Notts County	1–1	1–1	1–1	1–0	3–2	3–0	1–1	2–0	2–0	1–1	2–1	2–0	1–0	1–1		3–2	1–1	1–2	2–3	2–0	2–2	3–3
Oldham Athletic	0–2	2–1	2–2	1–1	4–1	2–0	1–1	1–1	1–1	2–0	2–1	1–0	0–1	2–2	2–1		2–1	3–0	1–1	1–1	1–1	1–1
Orient	0–0	1–4	1–1	0–1	2–1	3–0	2–1	0–0	0–0	1–1	2–1	0–0	4–2	0–0	0–0	5–3		3–1	1–1	2–0	2–2	1–1
Sheffield United	2–0	0–0	1–5	2–0	1–1	2–1	0–1	1–0	0–2	2–1	2–0	4–1	2–0	5–2	4–1	1–0	2–0		3–2	1–2	1–1	2–2
Southampton	5–0	2–0	2–2	1–1	3–1	3–0	3–1	4–1	2–0	2–0	1–0	0–1	1–0	2–3	3–1	2–2	1–0	2–1		1–0	4–2	0–0
Stoke City	4–2	1–2	0–0	1–0	3–2	2–1	2–0	4–0	0–2	2–0	1–0	0–0	1–1	2–1	1–1	3–0	5–1	4–0	1–0		0–0	1–3
Sunderland	0–1	2–1	0–2	0–2	5–1	3–0	1–1	3–0	0–0	2–2	2–0	1–1	1–0	2–0	3–1	3–1	1–1	5–1	0–0	1–0		1–2
Tottenham Hotspur	4–0	2–2	1–0	0–0	9–0	3–0	2–1	2–1	2–2	1–0	1–0	2–0	1–1	3–3	2–1	5–1	1–1	4–2	0–0	3–1	2–3	

Updated to match(es) played on unknown. Source: Ian Laschke: Rothmans Book of Football League Records 1888–89 to 1978–79. Macdonald and Jane’s, London & Sydney, 1980.
Legend: Blue = home team win; Yellow = draw; Red = away team win.

=== Managerial changes ===
Team	Outgoing manager	Manner of departure	Date of vacancy	Position in table	Incoming manager	Date of appointment
Orient	(England) George Petchey	Resigned	26 August 1977	21st	(England) Jimmy Bloomfield	12 September 1977
Hull City	(England) John Kaye	Sacked	29 September 1977	13th	(Scotland) Bobby Collins	1 October 1977
Notts County	(England) Ron Fenton	Sacked	5 October 1977	21st	(Scotland) Jimmy Sirrel	9 October 1977
Sheffield United	(Scotland) Jimmy Sirrel	Signed by Notts County	9 October 1977	15th	(England) Cec Coldwell (caretaker)	9 October 1977
Bristol Rovers	(England) Don Megson	Sacked	22 November 1977	21st	(Scotland) Bobby Campbell	22 November 1977
Millwall	(England) Gordon Jago	Resigned	5 December 1977	18th	(England) George Petchey	4 January 1978
Stoke City	(England) George Eastham	Sacked	9 January 1978	14th	(Wales) Alan Durban	13 February 1978
Sheffield United	(England) Cec Coldwell	End of caretaker spell	23 January 1978	11th	(England) Harry Haslam	23 January 1978
Luton Town	(England) Harry Haslam	Signed by Sheffield United	23 January 1978	7th	(England) David Pleat	23 January 1978
Blackpool	(Scotland) Allan Brown	Mutual consent	6 February 1978	7th	(England) Jimmy Meadows	7 March 1978
Hull City	(Scotland) Bobby Collins	Sacked	10 February 1978	18th	(England) Wilf McGuinness (caretaker)	10 February 1978
Mansfield Town	(England) Peter Morris	Sacked	22 February 1978	22nd	(Northern Ireland) Billy Bingham	25 February 1978
Blackburn Rovers	(England) Jim Smith	Signed by Birmingham City	12 March 1978	5th	(England) Jim Iley	14 April 1978
Hull City	(England) Wilf McGuinness	End of caretaker spell	17 April 1978	21st	(England) Ken Houghton	17 April 1978

=== Maps ===
Locations of the Football League Second Division London teams 1977–1978
Locations of the Football League Second Division 1977–1978 teams

== Third Division ==
Football League Third Division
- Season: 1977–78
- Champions: Wrexham (1st title)
- Promoted: Cambridge United; Preston North End
- Relegated: Bradford City; Hereford United; Portsmouth; Port Vale
- Matches: 552
- Goals: 1,373 (2.49 per match)
- Top goalscorer: Alex Bruce (Preston North End), 27

Pos	Team	Pld	W	D	L	GF	GA	GD	Pts	Promotion or relegation
1	Wrexham (C, P)	46	23	15	8	78	45	+33	61	Cup Winners' Cup first round and promotion to the Second Division (Note: Wrexham qualified for the European Cup Winners' Cup as the Welsh Cup winners.)
2	Cambridge United (P)	46	23	12	11	72	51	+21	58	Promotion to the Second Division
3	Preston North End (P)	46	20	16	10	63	38	+25	56	Promotion to the Second Division
4	Peterborough United	46	20	16	10	47	33	+14	56	
5	Chester	46	16	22	8	59	56	+3	54	
6	Walsall	46	18	17	11	61	50	+11	53	
7	Gillingham	46	15	20	11	67	60	+7	50	
8	Colchester United	46	15	18	13	55	44	+11	48	
9	Chesterfield	46	17	14	15	58	49	+9	48	
10	Swindon Town	46	16	16	14	67	60	+7	48	
11	Shrewsbury Town	46	16	15	15	63	57	+6	47	
12	Tranmere Rovers	46	16	15	15	57	52	+5	47	
13	Carlisle United	46	14	19	13	59	59	0	47	
14	Sheffield Wednesday	46	15	16	15	50	52	−2	46	
15	Bury	46	13	19	14	62	56	+6	45	
16	Lincoln City	46	15	15	16	53	61	−8	45	
17	Exeter City	46	15	14	17	49	59	−10	44	
18	Oxford United	46	13	14	19	64	67	−3	40	
19	Plymouth Argyle	46	11	17	18	61	68	−7	39	
20	Rotherham United	46	13	13	20	51	68	−17	39	
21	Port Vale (R)	46	8	20	18	46	67	−21	36	Relegation to the Fourth Division
22	Bradford City (R)	46	12	10	24	56	86	−30	34	Relegation to the Fourth Division
23	Hereford United (R)	46	9	14	23	34	60	−26	32	Relegation to the Fourth Division
24	Portsmouth (R)	46	7	17	22	41	75	−34	31	Relegation to the Fourth Division

Source: rsssf.com
(C) Champions; (P) Promoted; (R) Relegated

=== Results ===
Home \ Away	BRA	BRY	CAM	CRL	CHE	CHF	COL	EXE	GIL	HER	LIN	OXF	PET	PLY	POR	PTV	PNE	ROT	SHW	SHR	SWI	TRA	WAL	WRE
Bradford City		2–1	4–0	2–2	2–2	1–3	1–2	1–2	2–1	0–0	2–2	2–3	2–1	0–1	1–0	1–1	1–1	3–0	3–2	2–0	2–1	2–0	2–3	2–1
Bury	2–2		5–2	1–1	1–1	0–0	1–1	5–0	2–2	1–1	1–0	3–2	0–0	1–1	0–0	3–0	1–1	1–1	3–0	0–3	0–0	1–0	0–1	2–3
Cambridge United	4–1	3–0		2–0	0–0	2–0	2–0	2–1	2–3	2–0	5–0	2–1	1–0	3–0	1–0	2–0	1–1	1–1	3–0	2–0	5–2	1–0	2–1	1–0
Carlisle United	1–1	0–3	1–1		0–0	2–1	1–3	2–0	1–0	2–0	2–3	2–2	0–0	0–0	3–1	1–1	3–1	2–1	1–0	1–0	2–2	2–2	2–0	1–4
Chester	3–2	1–0	0–0	2–2		2–1	2–1	2–1	2–2	4–1	2–2	3–1	4–3	1–1	2–0	2–1	1–2	2–1	2–1	1–0	1–0	0–0	1–1	1–1
Chesterfield	2–0	2–1	2–1	2–1	1–2		0–0	0–0	5–2	2–1	0–0	3–0	2–0	4–1	3–0	2–0	0–1	0–0	2–2	3–1	3–1	1–1	0–1	1–0
Colchester United	3–0	1–0	2–1	2–2	2–0	2–0		3–1	1–1	0–0	1–1	1–1	3–0	3–1	4–0	2–3	0–0	0–0	1–1	1–2	2–0	0–0	1–1	1–1
Exeter City	1–0	2–2	2–4	0–1	1–1	0–0	0–0		2–1	1–0	3–0	2–1	1–0	0–0	0–1	4–1	2–0	1–0	2–1	1–1	0–0	4–2	1–1	0–1
Gillingham	4–1	1–4	3–1	1–1	1–0	3–0	1–3	1–0		4–0	0–0	2–1	0–0	1–1	0–0	1–1	2–1	2–1	2–1	1–1	2–2	1–1	3–1	0–0
Hereford United	2–1	1–0	0–0	1–0	2–2	2–1	1–0	4–0	2–0		1–1	2–1	0–0	1–3	0–2	1–1	0–0	2–3	0–1	1–1	1–1	0–1	3–2	1–1
Lincoln City	3–2	0–0	4–1	2–1	2–1	1–0	0–0	1–2	0–2	0–0		1–0	0–1	2–2	1–0	3–0	2–2	3–3	3–1	1–3	3–1	1–1	2–2	0–1
Oxford United	3–1	0–0	2–3	0–0	4–1	1–1	3–0	0–0	1–1	3–0	1–0		3–3	2–1	0–0	1–1	1–0	2–3	1–0	1–1	3–3	1–0	3–1	2–1
Peterborough United	5–0	2–1	2–0	2–1	0–0	2–0	1–0	1–1	1–1	2–1	0–1	1–0		1–0	0–0	1–1	1–0	1–0	2–1	2–1	2–0	1–0	0–0	2–2
Plymouth Argyle	6–0	0–1	0–1	0–1	2–2	2–0	1–1	2–2	1–3	2–0	1–2	2–1	1–0		3–1	3–2	0–0	1–1	1–1	2–2	0–2	0–1	3–3	0–1
Portsmouth	3–1	1–1	2–2	3–3	0–0	3–0	0–0	1–1	1–1	2–0	0–2	0–2	2–2	1–5		1–1	0–2	3–3	2–2	2–0	1–2	2–5	1–2	0–1
Port Vale	1–0	1–2	1–1	0–1	0–0	1–3	0–3	4–0	2–2	1–0	2–1	1–1	0–0	3–3	2–0		0–0	3–0	0–0	1–2	1–0	1–1	2–2	1–1
Preston North End	3–1	4–0	2–0	2–1	2–1	0–0	4–0	0–0	2–0	0–0	4–0	3–2	0–1	5–2	3–1	2–0		3–2	2–1	2–2	1–1	2–1	1–0	1–3
Rotherham United	2–1	0–3	1–0	0–0	1–1	1–2	1–0	1–0	2–0	1–0	0–0	2–0	0–1	1–2	0–1	2–0	2–1		1–2	0–0	1–3	2–0	3–0	2–2
Sheffield Wednesday	2–0	3–2	0–0	3–1	1–1	1–0	1–2	2–1	0–0	1–0	2–0	2–1	0–1	1–1	0–0	3–1	1–0	1–0		0–1	1–1	1–0	0–0	2–1
Shrewsbury Town	4–0	5–3	3–3	0–3	0–0	1–1	1–0	0–2	1–2	3–0	0–1	1–0	0–0	3–1	6–1	3–0	0–0	4–1	0–0		2–3	3–1	0–0	2–1
Swindon Town	0–1	1–1	0–0	2–2	1–1	2–1	0–0	4–0	3–2	1–0	1–0	3–2	2–0	3–1	3–1	1–1	0–2	2–0	2–2	5–0		1–0	2–3	1–2
Tranmere Rovers	0–0	0–0	0–1	3–2	5–0	1–1	1–0	2–1	1–1	2–1	3–1	4–1	0–2	1–1	2–0	2–1	1–0	2–2	3–1	2–0	1–1		0–1	3–1
Walsall	1–1	1–2	0–0	0–0	3–0	2–2	4–2	1–3	2–1	2–0	3–1	2–1	1–0	1–0	1–1	2–0	0–0	3–1	1–1	3–0	2–0	0–0		0–1
Wrexham	2–0	3–1	4–1	3–1	1–2	1–1	2–1	2–1	3–3	2–1	1–0	2–2	0–0	2–0	2–0	1–1	0–0	7–1	1–1	0–0	2–1	6–1	1–0	

Updated to match(es) played on unknown. Source: Ian Laschke: Rothmans Book of Football League Records 1888–89 to 1978–79. Macdonald and Jane’s, London & Sydney, 1980.
Legend: Blue = home team win; Yellow = draw; Red = away team win.

=== Maps ===
Locations of the Football League Second Division London teams 1977–1978
Locations of the Football League Third Division teams 1977–1978

== Fourth Division ==
Football League Fourth Division
- Season: 1977–78
- Champions: Watford (1st title)
- Promoted: Brentford; Southend United; Swansea City
- Failed re-election: Southport
- New club in the league: Wimbledon
- Matches: 552
- Goals: 1,427 (2.59 per match)
- Top goalscorer: Alan Curtis (Swansea City), 32; Steve Phillips (Brentford), 32

Pos	Team	Pld	W	D	L	GF	GA	GD	Pts	Promotion or relegation
1	Watford (C, P)	46	30	11	5	85	38	+47	71	Promotion to the Third Division
2	Southend United (P)	46	25	10	11	66	39	+27	60	Promotion to the Third Division
3	Swansea City (P)	46	23	10	13	87	47	+40	56	Promotion to the Third Division
4	Brentford (P)	46	21	14	11	86	54	+32	56	Promotion to the Third Division
5	Aldershot	46	19	16	11	67	47	+20	54	
6	Grimsby Town	46	21	11	14	57	51	+6	53	
7	Barnsley	46	18	14	14	61	49	+12	50	
8	Reading	46	18	14	14	55	52	+3	50	
9	Torquay United	46	16	15	15	57	56	+1	47	
10	Northampton Town	46	17	13	16	63	68	−5	47	
11	Huddersfield Town	46	15	15	16	63	55	+8	45	
12	Doncaster Rovers	46	14	17	15	52	65	−13	45	
13	Wimbledon	46	14	16	16	66	67	−1	44	
14	Scunthorpe United	46	14	16	16	50	55	−5	44	
15	Crewe Alexandra	46	15	14	17	50	69	−19	44	
16	Newport County	46	16	11	19	65	73	−8	43	
17	Bournemouth	46	14	15	17	41	51	−10	43	
18	Stockport County	46	16	10	20	56	56	0	42	
19	Darlington	46	14	13	19	52	59	−7	41	
20	Halifax Town	46	10	21	15	52	62	−10	41	
21	Hartlepool United	46	15	7	24	51	84	−33	37	Re-elected
22	York City	46	12	12	22	50	69	−19	36	Re-elected
23	Southport (R)	46	6	19	21	52	76	−24	31	Failed re-election and demoted to the Northern Premier League
24	Rochdale	46	8	8	30	43	85	−42	24	Re-elected

(C) Champions; (P) Promoted; (R) Relegated

=== Results ===
Home \ Away	BOU	ALD	BAR	BRE	CRE	DAR	DON	GRI	HAL	HAR	HUD	NPC	NOR	REA	ROC	SCU	STD	SOU	STP	SWA	TOR	WAT	WDN	YOR
AFC Bournemouth		0–0	2–2	3–2	1–0	2–0	0–1	1–0	0–0	1–0	1–0	4–2	1–1	1–0	1–0	1–1	0–3	3–1	1–0	0–1	1–1	1–2	1–2	2–1
Aldershot	2–0		0–0	1–0	2–0	3–2	1–0	4–2	0–0	3–0	3–3	2–2	2–1	1–1	2–0	4–0	3–0	0–0	2–1	2–2	3–0	1–0	3–1	1–1
Barnsley	3–0	2–0		0–0	4–0	2–1	0–0	1–2	3–2	3–2	1–1	1–0	2–3	4–1	4–0	3–0	1–1	2–1	0–1	0–2	2–0	1–0	3–2	2–1
Brentford	1–1	2–0	2–0		5–1	2–0	2–2	3–1	4–1	2–0	1–1	3–3	3–0	1–1	4–0	2–0	1–0	0–0	4–0	0–2	3–0	0–3	4–1	1–0
Crewe Alexandra	3–1	0–2	2–1	4–6		2–2	2–0	0–2	0–0	1–0	1–1	2–0	3–2	1–1	2–1	1–1	0–1	2–0	1–1	2–1	2–0	2–2	0–0	1–0
Darlington	1–0	1–1	0–2	1–3	2–0		1–1	1–2	2–1	1–2	2–2	2–1	2–0	2–0	1–0	1–1	2–0	3–0	2–2	1–1	0–0	0–0	3–1	0–2
Doncaster Rovers	0–0	4–3	2–1	3–1	2–0	1–2		0–1	1–1	2–0	4–3	2–2	4–2	2–2	1–1	1–1	2–0	2–1	1–0	1–1	1–0	0–1	0–2	1–1
Grimsby Town	0–2	1–0	1–0	2–1	2–2	2–0	0–0		0–0	2–1	1–0	1–0	0–1	0–1	2–1	0–0	2–0	2–0	0–0	2–1	3–1	1–1	3–1	3–2
Halifax Town	0–0	2–1	1–1	1–1	1–1	0–2	0–1	0–0		3–0	0–0	3–1	0–1	2–4	3–1	2–2	0–1	2–1	1–1	3–1	0–0	1–1	1–2	2–0
Hartlepool	0–1	2–2	1–2	3–1	1–1	2–1	0–2	3–1	1–1		3–2	1–1	0–2	2–1	1–0	1–0	1–0	2–1	2–0	0–4	1–2	1–2	2–0	4–2
Huddersfield Town	2–0	1–1	2–0	1–3	3–0	2–1	4–1	1–3	2–2	3–1		2–0	0–1	0–2	3–1	4–1	2–0	3–1	0–0	0–0	1–1	1–0	3–0	1–2
Newport County	3–2	2–1	3–1	1–2	1–0	1–1	1–0	3–0	2–0	4–2	2–0		5–3	0–0	3–0	3–1	1–2	1–1	2–2	1–0	0–0	2–2	0–1	2–1
Northampton Town	1–0	1–1	1–1	2–2	0–0	2–2	0–0	2–1	1–2	5–3	3–1	2–4		0–2	3–1	1–2	0–0	1–0	2–1	3–1	1–0	0–2	0–3	1–1
Reading	0–0	1–0	0–0	0–0	2–0	2–1	3–0	0–0	2–1	2–3	1–0	2–0	0–0		4–3	1–0	0–1	3–1	2–1	1–4	3–3	1–3	2–2	1–0
Rochdale	1–1	0–0	1–1	1–2	0–2	2–0	3–1	1–3	3–1	0–1	0–0	0–1	1–1	1–0		1–1	1–2	2–1	2–1	2–1	1–3	2–3	3–0	1–2
Scunthorpe United	0–0	1–1	1–0	1–1	3–0	3–0	0–0	2–1	2–0	2–0	1–1	2–0	2–2	0–1	1–0		1–2	0–2	3–0	1–0	0–1	0–1	3–0	2–1
Southend United	5–1	3–1	0–0	2–1	1–0	2–0	4–0	1–1	5–0	1–1	1–3	4–2	0–0	0–2	3–1	2–0		4–2	0–2	2–1	4–0	1–0	1–0	0–0
Southport	0–0	1–1	1–1	1–3	1–2	1–0	1–1	2–2	1–2	1–1	1–1	3–3	3–1	1–1	3–1	1–1	0–0		2–0	0–3	0–0	2–2	0–5	4–1
Stockport County	2–1	2–1	3–0	1–1	1–2	1–0	1–1	2–0	1–3	6–0	0–1	2–0	1–2	2–0	2–0	1–1	1–0	2–1		2–0	3–0	1–3	2–2	2–0
Swansea City	1–0	1–0	2–1	2–1	5–0	1–2	3–0	2–0	2–0	8–0	1–0	4–0	2–4	2–1	3–0	3–1	0–0	1–1	3–1		1–1	3–3	3–0	1–1
Torquay United	1–1	1–2	3–1	2–1	1–2	0–0	2–0	3–1	2–2	0–0	2–1	2–0	2–1	3–0	3–0	4–2	0–1	2–2	2–0	2–4		2–3	1–1	3–0
Watford	2–1	1–0	0–0	1–1	5–2	2–1	6–0	1–0	1–1	1–0	2–0	2–0	3–0	1–0	1–0	4–1	1–1	3–2	1–0	2–1	1–0		2–0	1–3
Wimbledon	3–1	1–2	0–0	1–1	0–0	1–1	3–3	2–2	3–3	3–0	2–0	3–0	2–0	1–1	5–1	0–0	1–3	2–2	2–0	1–1	0–1	1–3		2–1
York City	0–0	1–2	1–2	3–2	1–1	1–2	2–1	1–2	1–1	1–0	1–1	2–0	0–3	2–0	2–2	0–2	1–2	2–1	2–1	2–1	0–0	0–4	1–1	

Updated to match(es) played on unknown. Source: Ian Laschke: Rothmans Book of Football League Records 1888–89 to 1978–79. Macdonald and Jane’s, London & Sydney, 1980.
Legend: Blue = home team win; Yellow = draw; Red = away team win.

=== Maps ===
Locations of the Football League Fourth Division London teams 1977–1978
Locations of the Football League Fourth Division teams 1977–1978

== Attendances ==
=== Division One ===
No.	Club	Average	Highest	Lowest
1	Manchester United	51,860	58,398	41,625
2	Liverpool FC	45,546	51,668	38,249
3	Manchester City FC	41,687	50,856	32,412
4	Everton FC	39,513	52,759	33,402
5	Aston Villa FC	35,464	45,436	25,493
6	Arsenal FC	35,446	47,110	23,506
7	Nottingham Forest FC	32,501	47,218	21,743
8	Leeds United FC	29,186	46,727	16,531
9	Chelsea FC	28,734	44,093	18,108
10	West Ham United FC	25,620	37,448	19,260
11	Newcastle United FC	24,729	41,612	7,986
12	West Bromwich Albion FC	24,126	36,067	17,053
13	Birmingham City FC	23,911	33,679	14,302
14	Ipswich Town FC	23,586	30,384	16,952
15	Bristol City FC	23,357	31,506	16,993
16	Coventry City FC	23,353	36,894	13,910
17	Derby County FC	23,345	33,384	18,189
18	Wolverhampton Wanderers FC	22,311	30,644	15,466
19	Queens Park Rangers FC	19,941	26,267	12,925
20	Middlesbrough FC	19,874	30,805	13,247
21	Norwich City FC	19,375	29,168	12,836
22	Leicester City FC	17,768	26,051	11,530

=== Division Two ===
No.	Club	Average	Highest	Lowest
1	Tottenham Hotspur FC	33,417	50,097	24,636
2	Brighton & Hove Albion FC	25,265	33,431	18,969
3	Bolton Wanderers FC	22,877	36,384	16,232
4	Sunderland AFC	22,276	31,960	11,161
5	Southampton FC	21,167	28,846	15,789
6	Crystal Palace FC	19,636	40,522	11,509
7	Sheffield United FC	15,489	31,207	11,595
8	Stoke City FC	15,038	21,012	10,992
9	Blackburn Rovers FC	12,227	27,835	6,316
10	Burnley FC	11,581	27,427	7,242
11	Charlton Athletic FC	11,307	30,706	5,139
12	Fulham FC	10,550	24,763	6,064
13	Blackpool FC	10,118	25,789	4,695
14	Oldham Athletic FC	9,583	22,184	6,452
15	Notts County FC	9,268	15,718	7,200
16	Luton Town FC	9,252	17,024	5,913
17	Mansfield Town FC	8,982	14,268	5,859
18	Leyton Orient FC	8,365	24,131	4,427
19	Cardiff City FC	8,365	12,538	5,663
20	Millwall FC	8,197	15,216	3,322
21	Bristol Rovers FC	8,108	17,708	4,550
22	Hull City AFC	6,835	16,189	3,645

=== Division Three ===
No.	Club	Average	Highest	Lowest
1	Wrexham AFC	11,651	23,451	5,260
2	Sheffield Wednesday FC	11,592	18,973	8,661
3	Portsmouth FC	9,678	13,152	5,825
4	Preston North End FC	8,799	16,078	5,319
5	Swindon Town FC	7,367	11,265	4,135
6	Gillingham FC	7,178	10,978	3,450
7	Plymouth Argyle FC	6,763	12,635	4,639
8	Peterborough United FC	5,974	10,156	3,943
9	Cambridge United FC	5,633	10,998	3,397
10	Carlisle United FC	5,319	11,309	3,693
11	Walsall FC	5,317	8,341	4,218
12	Bradford City AFC	5,103	12,825	3,203
13	Bury FC	4,979	9,783	2,536
14	Oxford United FC	4,972	9,083	3,382
15	Rotherham United FC	4,913	12,630	3,244
16	Hereford United FC	4,900	10,183	3,441
17	Exeter City FC	4,887	8,334	3,156
18	Lincoln City FC	4,878	8,811	3,205
19	Chesterfield FC	4,866	12,495	2,748
20	Colchester United FC	4,572	6,447	2,554
21	Chester City FC	4,165	9,801	2,121
22	Port Vale FC	3,947	6,912	3,220
23	Tranmere Rovers	3,926	7,224	2,035
24	Shrewsbury Town FC	3,378	6,116	1,727

=== Division Four ===
No.	Club	Average	Highest	Lowest
1	Watford FC	11,352	18,947	6,850
2	Brentford FC	8,578	14,496	5,492
3	Swansea City AFC	8,108	16,152	4,240
4	Southend United FC	7,287	11,810	3,693
5	Barnsley FC	5,659	8,797	2,642
6	Grimsby Town FC	4,696	7,434	2,731
7	Reading FC	4,567	7,384	2,457
8	Huddersfield Town AFC	4,508	7,583	1,638
9	Aldershot Town FC	4,347	8,175	2,190
10	Newport County AFC	4,074	8,520	2,112
11	Stockport County FC	4,010	6,177	2,168
12	Northampton Town FC	3,517	8,041	2,278
13	AFC Bournemouth	3,348	6,532	2,221
14	Scunthorpe United FC	3,281	7,771	1,959
15	Doncaster Rovers FC	3,228	7,971	1,440
16	Wimbledon FC	3,135	7,324	1,440
17	Torquay United FC	2,878	6,398	1,845
18	Hartlepool United FC	2,833	5,299	1,926
19	Crewe Alexandra FC	2,290	4,652	1,462
20	York City FC	2,284	4,192	1,389
21	Halifax Town AFC	2,199	4,956	1,077
22	Darlington FC	1,993	3,372	1,115
23	Southport FC	1,873	2,834	838
24	Rochdale AFC	1,275	2,668	734

== See also ==
- 1977–78 in English football
