= John Halpin (disambiguation) =

John Halpin may refer to:

- Johnny Halpin (John Thomas Halpin, 1927-2001), English footballer for Bury and Shrewsbury Town, see A49 derby
- John Halpin (born 1961), Scottish footballer
