= 1975–76 Football League =

77th season of the Football League

The Football League
- Season: 1975–76
- Champions: Liverpool

The 1975–76 season was the 77th completed season of The Football League.

Liverpool won their first major trophy under Bob Paisley by narrowly winning the league title after heated competition from Queens Park Rangers. They also lifted the UEFA Cup for the second time in their history. Dave Sexton's QPR side failed to win their first-ever league title but still managed to finish in their highest ever position of runners-up and qualify for the UEFA Cup. Following QPR into Europe were Tommy Docherty's promising young Manchester United side, Dave Mackay's defending champions Derby County and Jimmy Armfield's Leeds United.

Going down were Wolverhampton Wanderers, Burnley and Sheffield United.

Bertie Mee, 57, retired after ten years as manager of Arsenal. The highlights of his career had been the Inter-Cities Fairs Cup triumph of 1970 and the Double win 1971, but Arsenal had fallen behind the best in recent seasons and Mee handed over the reins to Terry Neill.

Three years after winning the FA Cup, Bob Stokoe's Sunderland finally won promotion to the top flight as Second Division champions. Bristol City and West Bromwich Albion occupied the two other promotion places. Oxford United, York City and Portsmouth went down to the Third Division.

The division's biggest headline hitters were Southampton, who finished sixth in the league but surprised the footballing world by overcoming Manchester United to win the FA Cup.

Hereford United won the Third Division title to reach the Second Division just four years after joining the league. Also going up to the Second Division were Cardiff City and Millwall. Aldershot, Colchester United, Southend United and Halifax Town were relegated to the Fourth Division. Narrowly avoiding the drop were Sheffield Wednesday, who a decade before were one of the most feared sides in England and during the interwar years had won the league championship and the FA Cup.

The 32-year-old Graham Taylor achieved the first success of his managerial career by winning the Fourth Division title with Lincoln City. Their points tally is an English record under the 2 points for a win system for any of the top 4 divisions. He was linked with several job vacancies in the First and Second Divisions but surprised everyone by taking over at Elton John's Watford, who were still in the Fourth Division. It was to be the start of a long and successful association with the Hornets for Taylor. Joining Lincoln in the Third Division were Northampton Town, Reading and Tranmere Rovers. 1975–76 had finally brought something positive after a decade of trauma for Northampton Town, which had seen them slump from the First Division to the Fourth Division.

This year, the Football League voted in favour of the bottom four clubs in the Fourth Division and there were no departures or arrivals in the league for 1976–77.

== Final league tables and results ==
The tables and results below are reproduced here in the exact form that they can be found at The Rec.Sport.Soccer Statistics Foundation website and in Rothmans Book of Football League Records 1888–89 to 1978–79, with home and away statistics separated.

Beginning with the season 1894–95, clubs finishing level on points were separated according to goal average (goals scored divided by goals conceded), or more properly put, goal ratio. In case one or more teams had the same goal difference, this system favoured those teams who had scored fewer goals. The 1975-76 season was the last season that the goal average system was used.

Since the Fourth Division was established in the 1958–59 season, the bottom four teams of that division have been required to apply for re-election.

== First Division ==
Football League First Division
- Season: 1975–76
- Champions: Liverpool; 9th English title
- Relegated: Wolverhampton Wanderers; Burnley; Sheffield United
- European Cup: Liverpool
- UEFA Cup: Queens Park Rangers; Manchester United; Derby County; Manchester City
- Matches: 462
- Goals: 1,230 (2.66 per match)
- Top goalscorer: Ted MacDougall (23 goals)
- Biggest home win: Arsenal 5–0 Coventry City (11 October 1975); Queens Park Rangers 5–0 Everton (11 October 1975); Newcastle United 5–0 Everton (10 January 1976); Arsenal 6–1 West Ham United (20 March 1976); Tottenham Hotspur 5–0 Sheffield United (27 March 1976); Wolverhampton Wanderers 5–0 Newcastle United (10 April 1976)
- Biggest away win: Birmingham City 1–5 West Ham United (1 November 1975); Burnley 1–5 Wolverhampton Wanderers (15 November 1975); Derby County 1–5 Queens Park Rangers (23 April 1976); Ipswich Town 2–6 Derby County (24 April 1976)
- Highest scoring: Norwich City 5–3 Aston Villa (23 April 1976)

Liverpool won their first silverware under Bob Paisley by lifting their second UEFA Cup, and winning the league title. They won eight of their last nine matches and finished one point ahead of QPR, who achieved the highest finish of their history. Manchester United's revival under Tommy Docherty continued as they finished third in the league and reached their first cup final of the 1970s, where they took on Second Division underdogs Southampton in the FA Cup Final but surprisingly lost 1-0. Defending champions Derby County surrendered their title crown but managed a decent fourth-place finish in the league. Leeds United completed the top five but were denied a place in the UEFA Cup as they were still banned from Europe following the antics of their fans at the 1975 European Cup Final. Manchester City triumphed over Newcastle United in the final of the League Cup to win their first major trophy for six years.

FA Cup holders West Ham United finished 18th in the league but did enjoy a good run in Europe, finishing runners-up in the European Cup Winners' Cup. Arsenal endured another disappointing season as they finished 17th.

Sheffield United, who had finished sixth a year earlier, went down in bottom place after winning just six league games all season. They were joined by Burnley and Wolves.

Pos	Team	Pld	W	D	L	GF	GA	GAv	Pts	Qualification or relegation
1	Liverpool (C)	42	23	14	5	66	31	2.129	60	Qualification for the European Cup first round
2	Queens Park Rangers	42	24	11	7	67	33	2.030	59	Qualification for the UEFA Cup first round
3	Manchester United	42	23	10	9	68	42	1.619	56	Qualification for the UEFA Cup first round
4	Derby County	42	21	11	10	75	58	1.293	53	Qualification for the UEFA Cup first round
5	Leeds United	42	21	9	12	65	46	1.413	51	
6	Ipswich Town	42	16	14	12	54	48	1.125	46	
7	Leicester City	42	13	19	10	48	51	0.941	45	
8	Manchester City	42	16	11	15	64	46	1.391	43	Qualification for the UEFA Cup first round
9	Tottenham Hotspur	42	14	15	13	63	63	1.000	43	
10	Norwich City	42	16	10	16	58	58	1.000	42	
11	Everton	42	15	12	15	60	66	0.909	42	
12	Stoke City	42	15	11	16	48	50	0.960	41	
13	Middlesbrough	42	15	10	17	46	45	1.022	40	
14	Coventry City	42	13	14	15	47	57	0.825	40	
15	Newcastle United	42	15	9	18	71	62	1.145	39	
16	Aston Villa	42	11	17	14	51	59	0.864	39	
17	Arsenal	42	13	10	19	47	53	0.887	36	
18	West Ham United	42	13	10	19	48	71	0.676	36	
19	Birmingham City	42	13	7	22	57	75	0.760	33	
20	Wolverhampton Wanderers (R)	42	10	10	22	51	68	0.750	30	Relegation to the Second Division
21	Burnley (R)	42	9	10	23	43	66	0.652	28	Relegation to the Second Division
22	Sheffield United (R)	42	6	10	26	33	82	0.402	22	Relegation to the Second Division

Source: World Football
Rules for classification: 1) Points; 2) Goal average; 3) Goals scored
(C) Champions; (R) Relegated

=== Results ===
Home \ Away	ARS	AST	BIR	BUR	COV	DER	EVE	IPS	LEE	LEI	LIV	MCI	MUN	MID	NEW	NWC	QPR	SHU	STK	TOT	WHU	WOL
Arsenal		0–0	1–0	1–0	5–0	0–1	2–2	1–2	1–2	1–1	1–0	2–3	3–1	2–1	0–0	2–1	2–0	1–0	0–1	0–2	6–1	2–1
Aston Villa	2–0		2–1	1–1	1–0	1–0	3–1	0–0	1–2	1–1	0–0	1–0	2–1	2–1	1–1	3–2	0–2	5–1	0–0	1–1	4–1	1–1
Birmingham City	3–1	3–2		4–0	1–1	2–1	0–1	3–0	2–2	2–1	0–1	2–1	0–2	2–1	3–2	1–1	1–1	2–0	1–1	3–1	1–5	0–1
Burnley	0–0	2–2	1–0		1–3	1–2	1–1	0–1	0–1	1–0	0–0	0–0	0–1	4–1	0–1	4–4	1–0	3–1	0–1	1–2	2–0	1–5
Coventry City	1–1	1–1	3–2	1–2		1–1	1–2	0–0	0–1	0–2	0–0	2–0	1–1	0–1	1–1	1–0	1–1	1–0	0–3	2–2	2–0	3–1
Derby County	2–0	2–0	4–2	3–0	2–0		1–3	1–0	3–2	2–2	1–1	1–0	2–1	3–2	3–2	3–1	1–5	3–2	1–1	2–3	2–1	3–2
Everton	0–0	2–1	5–2	2–3	1–4	2–0		3–3	1–3	1–1	0–0	1–1	1–1	3–1	3–0	1–1	0–2	3–0	2–1	1–0	2–0	3–0
Ipswich Town	2–0	3–0	4–2	0–0	1–1	2–6	1–0		2–1	1–1	2–0	2–1	3–0	0–3	0–3	2–0	1–1	1–1	1–1	1–2	4–0	3–0
Leeds United	3–0	1–0	3–0	2–1	2–0	1–1	5–2	1–0		4–0	0–3	2–1	1–2	0–2	3–0	0–3	2–1	0–1	2–0	1–1	1–1	3–0
Leicester City	2–1	2–2	3–3	3–2	0–3	2–1	1–0	0–0	2–1		1–1	1–0	2–1	0–0	1–0	0–0	0–1	1–1	1–1	2–3	3–3	2–0
Liverpool	2–2	3–0	3–1	2–0	1–1	1–1	1–0	3–3	2–0	1–0		1–0	3–1	0–2	2–0	1–3	2–0	1–0	5–3	3–2	2–2	2–0
Manchester City	3–1	2–1	2–0	0–0	4–2	4–3	3–0	1–1	0–1	1–1	0–3		2–2	4–0	4–0	3–0	0–0	4–0	1–0	2–1	3–0	3–2
Manchester United	3–1	2–0	3–1	2–1	1–1	1–1	2–1	1–0	3–2	0–0	0–0	2–0		3–0	1–0	1–0	2–1	5–1	0–1	3–2	4–0	1–0
Middlesbrough	0–1	0–0	2–0	1–1	2–0	0–2	1–1	2–0	0–0	0–1	0–1	1–0	0–0		3–3	0–1	0–0	3–0	3–0	1–0	3–0	1–0
Newcastle United	2–0	3–0	4–0	0–1	4–0	4–3	5–0	1–1	2–3	3–0	1–2	2–1	3–4	1–1		5–2	1–2	1–1	0–1	2–2	2–1	5–1
Norwich City	3–1	5–3	1–0	3–1	0–3	0–0	4–2	1–0	1–1	2–0	0–1	2–2	1–1	0–1	1–2		3–2	1–3	0–1	3–1	1–0	1–1
Queens Park Rangers	2–1	1–1	2–1	1–0	4–1	1–1	5–0	3–1	2–0	1–0	2–0	1–0	1–0	4–2	1–0	2–0		1–0	3–2	0–0	1–1	4–2
Sheffield United	1–3	2–1	1–1	2–1	0–1	1–1	0–0	1–2	0–2	1–2	0–0	2–2	1–4	1–1	1–0	0–1	0–0		0–2	1–2	3–2	1–4
Stoke City	2–1	1–1	1–0	4–1	0–1	1–0	3–2	0–1	3–2	1–2	1–1	0–0	0–1	1–0	1–1	0–2	0–1	2–1		1–2	1–2	2–2
Tottenham Hotspur	0–0	5–2	1–3	2–1	4–1	2–3	2–2	1–1	0–0	1–1	0–4	2–2	1–1	1–0	0–3	2–2	0–3	5–0	1–1		1–1	2–1
West Ham United	1–0	2–2	1–2	3–2	1–1	1–2	0–1	1–2	1–1	1–1	0–4	1–0	2–1	2–1	2–1	0–1	1–0	2–0	3–1	1–0		0–0
Wolverhampton Wanderers	0–0	0–0	2–0	3–2	0–1	0–0	1–2	1–0	1–1	2–2	1–3	0–4	0–2	1–2	5–0	1–0	2–2	5–1	2–1	0–1	0–1	

Updated to match(es) played on unknown. Source: Ian Laschke: Rothmans Book of Football League Records 1888–89 to 1978–79. Macdonald and Jane’s, London & Sydney, 1980.
Legend: Blue = home team win; Yellow = draw; Red = away team win.
- The match on 20 March 1976 between Leicester City and Aston Villa ended 2-2. Aston Villa defender Chris Nicholl scored all four goals - two for Villa and two own goals.

=== Maps ===
Locations of the Football League First Division London teams 1975–1976
Locations of the Football League First Division 1975–1976 teams

== Second Division ==
Second Division
- Season: 1975–76
- Champions: Sunderland
- Promoted: Sunderland; Bristol City; West Bromwich Albion
- Relegated: Oxford United; York City; Portsmouth
- Cup Winners' Cup: Southampton
- Matches: 462
- Goals: 1,106 (2.39 per match)
- Top goalscorer: Derek Hales (28 goals)
- Biggest home win: Bolton Wanderers 5–0 Charlton Athletic (4 October 1975)
- Biggest away win: Charlton Athletic 1–5 Luton Town (3 December 1975); Charlton Athletic 0–4 Bolton Wanderers (24 April 1976)
- Highest scoring: Blackpool 4–3 Southampton (20 September 1975)

Three years after making history as the first postwar FA Cup winners from outside the top flight, Sunderland finally made their way back to the First Division after six years away by winning the Second Division title. Runners-up Bristol City achieved promotion after 65 years away from the First Division, finishing level on points with West Bromwich Albion.

Bolton Wanderers missed out on promotion by a single point, while Southampton compensated for a failed promotion bid by winning the FA Cup at the expense of Manchester United - the first major trophy of their history.

Nottingham Forest progressed to eighth place in their first full season under the management of Brian Clough, while Chelsea's first season at this level for more than a decade produced a disappointing 11th-place finish, with financial problems still blighting the club.

Portsmouth, York City and Oxford United went down to the Third Division.

Pos	Team	Pld	W	D	L	GF	GA	GAv	Pts	Qualification or relegation
1	Sunderland (C, P)	42	24	8	10	67	36	1.861	56	Promotion to the First Division
2	Bristol City (P)	42	19	15	8	59	35	1.686	53	Promotion to the First Division
3	West Bromwich Albion (P)	42	20	13	9	50	33	1.515	53	Promotion to the First Division
4	Bolton Wanderers	42	20	12	10	64	38	1.684	52	
5	Notts County	42	19	11	12	60	41	1.463	49	
6	Southampton	42	21	7	14	66	50	1.320	49	Qualification for the Cup Winners' Cup first round (Note: Southampton qualified for the Cup Winners' Cup first round as the 1975–76 FA Cup winners.)
7	Luton Town	42	19	10	13	61	51	1.196	48	
8	Nottingham Forest	42	17	12	13	55	40	1.375	46	
9	Charlton Athletic	42	15	12	15	61	72	0.847	42	
10	Blackpool	42	14	14	14	40	49	0.816	42	
11	Chelsea	42	12	16	14	53	54	0.981	40	
12	Fulham	42	13	14	15	45	47	0.957	40	
13	Orient	42	13	14	15	37	39	0.949	40	
14	Hull City	42	14	11	17	45	49	0.918	39	
15	Blackburn Rovers	42	12	14	16	45	50	0.900	38	
16	Plymouth Argyle	42	13	12	17	48	54	0.889	38	
17	Oldham Athletic	42	13	12	17	57	68	0.838	38	
18	Bristol Rovers	42	11	16	15	38	50	0.760	38	
19	Carlisle United	42	12	13	17	45	59	0.763	37	
20	Oxford United (R)	42	11	11	20	39	59	0.661	33	Relegation to the Third Division
21	York City (R)	42	10	8	24	39	71	0.549	28	Relegation to the Third Division
22	Portsmouth (R)	42	9	7	26	32	61	0.525	25	Relegation to the Third Division

Rules for classification: 1) Points; 2) Goal average; 3) Goals scored
(C) Champions; (P) Promoted; (R) Relegated

=== Results ===
Home \ Away	BLB	BLP	BOL	BRI	BRR	CRL	CHA	CHE	FUL	HUL	LUT	NOT	NTC	OLD	ORI	OXF	PLY	POR	SOU	SUN	WBA	YOR
Blackburn Rovers		0–2	1–1	1–2	1–2	1–0	2–0	1–1	0–1	1–0	3–0	1–4	2–1	4–1	1–1	0–0	3–1	0–3	1–1	0–1	0–0	4–0
Blackpool	1–1		1–1	2–1	1–4	2–1	2–1	0–2	1–1	2–2	3–2	1–1	1–0	1–1	1–0	2–0	0–0	0–0	4–3	1–0	0–1	0–0
Bolton Wanderers	0–1	1–0		1–0	3–1	0–0	5–0	2–1	2–2	1–0	3–0	0–0	2–1	4–0	1–1	0–1	0–0	4–1	3–0	2–1	1–2	1–2
Bristol City	1–0	2–0	1–0		1–1	0–0	4–0	2–2	0–0	3–0	3–0	0–2	1–2	1–0	0–0	4–1	2–2	1–0	1–1	3–0	0–2	4–1
Bristol Rovers	1–1	1–1	2–2	0–0		0–1	0–0	1–2	1–0	0–1	0–1	4–2	0–0	1–0	1–1	0–1	0–0	2–0	2–0	1–0	1–1	2–1
Carlisle United	0–1	1–0	3–2	0–1	4–2		1–1	2–1	2–2	0–0	1–1	1–1	1–2	2–1	1–2	1–1	2–0	2–1	1–0	2–2	1–1	1–0
Charlton Athletic	2–1	1–1	0–4	2–2	3–0	4–2		1–1	3–2	1–0	1–5	2–2	1–2	3–1	1–1	2–1	2–0	1–3	4–1	1–2	2–1	3–2
Chelsea	3–1	2–0	0–1	1–1	0–0	3–1	2–3		0–0	0–0	2–2	0–0	2–0	0–3	0–2	3–1	2–2	2–0	1–1	1–0	1–2	0–0
Fulham	1–1	0–0	1–2	1–2	0–2	3–0	1–1	2–0		1–1	2–0	0–0	3–2	1–0	1–1	1–1	0–0	0–1	1–0	2–0	4–0	2–0
Hull City	0–1	1–0	2–2	3–1	0–0	2–3	2–2	1–2	1–2		1–2	1–0	0–2	3–0	1–0	2–0	4–0	1–0	0–0	1–4	2–1	1–1
Luton Town	1–1	3–0	0–2	0–0	3–1	3–0	1–1	3–0	1–0	2–0		1–1	1–1	2–3	1–0	3–2	1–1	3–1	1–0	2–0	2–1	4–0
Nottingham Forest	1–0	3–0	1–2	1–0	3–0	4–0	1–2	1–3	1–0	1–2	0–0		0–1	4–3	1–0	4–0	2–0	0–1	3–1	2–1	0–2	1–0
Notts County	3–0	1–2	1–1	1–1	1–1	1–0	2–0	3–2	4–0	1–2	1–0	0–0		5–1	2–0	0–1	1–0	2–0	0–0	0–0	0–2	4–0
Oldham Athletic	2–1	1–0	2–1	2–4	2–0	2–2	2–0	2–1	2–2	1–0	1–1	0–0	2–2		1–1	1–1	3–2	5–2	3–2	1–1	0–1	2–0
Orient	1–1	0–1	0–0	0–1	0–0	1–0	0–1	3–1	2–0	1–0	3–0	1–1	1–1	2–0		2–1	1–0	0–1	2–1	0–2	0–0	1–0
Oxford United	0–0	1–3	2–0	1–1	2–1	0–0	1–0	1–1	1–3	2–3	1–3	0–1	2–1	1–1	2–1		2–2	1–0	1–2	1–1	0–1	1–0
Plymouth Argyle	2–2	1–2	2–3	0–0	3–0	2–1	1–0	0–3	4–0	1–1	3–0	1–0	1–3	2–1	3–0	2–1		3–1	1–0	1–0	2–1	1–1
Portsmouth	0–1	2–0	0–1	0–1	1–2	1–0	2–2	1–1	0–1	1–1	0–2	1–1	1–3	1–1	2–1	0–2	2–0		0–1	0–0	0–1	0–1
Southampton	2–1	3–1	0–0	3–1	3–0	1–1	3–2	4–1	2–1	1–0	3–1	0–3	2–1	3–2	3–0	2–1	1–0	4–0		4–0	3–0	2–0
Sunderland	3–0	2–0	2–1	1–1	1–1	3–2	4–1	2–1	2–0	3–1	2–0	3–0	4–0	2–0	3–1	1–0	2–1	2–0	3–0		2–0	1–0
West Bromwich Albion	2–2	0–0	2–0	0–1	3–0	3–0	1–1	0–0	3–1	2–0	1–0	2–0	0–0	1–1	1–1	2–0	1–0	3–1	0–2	0–0		2–2
York City	2–1	1–1	1–2	1–4	0–0	1–2	1–3	2–2	1–0	1–2	2–3	3–2	1–2	1–0	0–2	2–0	3–1	2–1	2–1	1–4	0–1	

Updated to match(es) played on unknown. Source: Ian Laschke: Rothmans Book of Football League Records 1888–89 to 1978–79. Macdonald and Jane's, London & Sydney, 1980.
Legend: Blue = home team win; Yellow = draw; Red = away team win.

=== Maps ===
Locations of the Football League Second Division London teams 1975–1976
Locations of the Football League Second Division 1975–1976 teams

== Third Division ==
Third Division
- Season: 1975–76
- Champions: Hereford United
- Promoted: Hereford United; Cardiff City; Millwall
- Relegated: Aldershot; Colchester United; Southend United; Halifax Town
- Cup Winners' Cup: Cardiff City
- Matches: 552
- Goals: 1,440 (2.61 per match)
- Top goalscorer: Dixie McNeil (35 goals)

Pos	Team	Pld	W	D	L	GF	GA	GAv	Pts	Qualification or relegation
1	Hereford United (C, P)	46	26	11	9	86	55	1.564	63	Promotion to the Second Division
2	Cardiff City (P)	46	22	13	11	69	48	1.438	57	Cup Winners' Cup preliminary round and promotion to the Second Division
3	Millwall (P)	46	20	16	10	54	43	1.256	56	Promotion to the Second Division
4	Brighton & Hove Albion	46	22	9	15	78	53	1.472	53	
5	Crystal Palace	46	18	17	11	61	46	1.326	53	
6	Wrexham	46	20	12	14	66	55	1.200	52	
7	Walsall	46	18	14	14	74	61	1.213	50	
8	Preston North End	46	19	10	17	62	57	1.088	48	
9	Shrewsbury Town	46	19	10	17	61	59	1.034	48	
10	Peterborough United	46	15	18	13	63	63	1.000	48	
11	Mansfield Town	46	16	15	15	58	52	1.115	47	
12	Port Vale	46	15	16	15	55	54	1.019	46	
13	Bury	46	14	16	16	51	46	1.109	44	
14	Chesterfield	46	17	9	20	69	69	1.000	43	
15	Gillingham	46	12	19	15	58	68	0.853	43	
16	Rotherham United	46	15	12	19	54	65	0.831	42	
17	Chester	46	15	12	19	43	62	0.694	42	
18	Grimsby Town	46	15	10	21	62	74	0.838	40	
19	Swindon Town	46	16	8	22	62	75	0.827	40	
20	Sheffield Wednesday	46	12	16	18	48	59	0.814	40	
21	Aldershot (R)	46	13	13	20	59	75	0.787	39	Relegation to the Fourth Division
22	Colchester United (R)	46	12	14	20	41	65	0.631	38	Relegation to the Fourth Division
23	Southend United (R)	46	12	13	21	65	75	0.867	37	Relegation to the Fourth Division
24	Halifax Town (R)	46	11	13	22	41	61	0.672	35	Relegation to the Fourth Division

Rules for classification: 1) Points; 2) Goal average; 3) Goals scored
(C) Champions; (P) Promoted; (R) Relegated

=== Results ===
Home \ Away	ALD	B&HA	BRY	CAR	CHE	CHF	COL	CRY	GIL	GRI	HAL	HER	MAN	MIL	PET	PTV	PNE	ROT	SHW	SHR	STD	SWI	WAL	WRE
Aldershot		1–1	1–1	2–1	1–1	3–1	2–2	1–0	3–0	0–3	1–2	0–2	2–1	1–1	1–0	2–0	1–1	3–0	1–1	1–1	2–1	0–1	3–2	2–3
Brighton & Hove Albion	4–1		2–1	0–1	6–0	3–0	6–0	2–0	1–1	4–2	1–0	4–2	1–0	1–0	5–0	3–0	1–0	3–0	1–1	2–2	2–0	2–0	1–2	3–2
Bury	1–1	1–1		0–1	1–0	3–1	0–0	0–1	2–0	1–1	0–0	2–3	2–1	2–0	2–1	1–2	2–0	4–0	0–0	2–1	1–0	5–0	1–1	0–1
Cardiff City	1–0	0–1	1–1		2–0	4–3	2–0	0–1	4–1	2–1	0–0	2–0	1–0	0–0	5–2	1–1	1–0	1–1	2–0	3–0	3–1	0–0	0–0	3–0
Chester	1–0	3–0	0–0	1–1		2–1	1–0	2–1	2–2	1–2	2–1	0–1	1–1	3–1	1–1	1–0	3–0	3–1	1–0	1–0	1–1	2–1	1–1	1–3
Chesterfield	5–2	2–1	3–2	1–1	1–1		6–1	1–2	0–1	4–3	1–2	2–3	1–2	2–2	1–1	0–1	3–0	1–0	1–0	2–1	1–2	4–0	2–1	1–1
Colchester United	2–0	2–0	0–0	3–2	1–0	2–3		0–3	2–2	1–0	0–1	1–4	0–2	0–1	1–1	1–0	1–1	0–0	2–1	1–1	2–1	1–2	2–0	0–2
Crystal Palace	0–0	0–1	1–0	0–1	2–0	0–0	3–2		0–1	3–0	1–1	2–2	4–1	0–0	1–1	2–2	2–0	2–0	1–1	1–1	1–1	3–3	0–1	1–1
Gillingham	1–1	1–0	2–0	2–2	2–0	2–2	0–1	1–2		3–0	1–1	3–4	3–1	3–1	2–2	2–1	1–0	0–0	0–0	2–1	1–2	3–2	2–3	1–1
Grimsby Town	1–0	2–1	0–0	2–0	2–0	3–0	0–1	1–2	2–1		2–2	1–0	4–1	2–1	1–1	1–1	0–0	4–1	1–1	3–2	2–2	1–0	1–2	3–2
Halifax Town	1–3	1–3	0–2	1–1	5–2	1–0	1–1	1–3	1–1	2–1		0–1	1–2	1–2	0–1	1–3	2–1	0–1	0–0	0–0	1–0	0–2	2–1	0–1
Hereford United	2–1	1–1	2–0	4–1	5–0	4–2	0–0	1–1	1–1	3–2	1–2		1–0	0–0	2–4	0–0	3–1	3–2	3–1	3–1	2–1	1–0	1–3	2–0
Mansfield Town	1–0	1–0	1–1	1–4	1–1	0–1	0–0	1–1	1–1	1–0	1–1	2–2		1–1	1–1	3–1	0–1	1–1	3–0	1–2	3–1	3–1	4–1	0–0
Millwall	4–1	3–1	0–0	1–3	1–0	2–0	1–1	2–1	2–2	1–1	1–0	1–0	1–0		2–0	1–0	2–0	3–1	1–0	0–0	2–1	0–0	2–1	2–1
Peterborough United	1–1	1–0	4–0	0–0	3–0	0–1	3–1	2–0	1–1	4–2	1–0	0–3	0–3	1–1		0–0	2–0	1–3	2–2	3–2	3–2	3–1	0–0	2–0
Port Vale	0–1	1–1	2–1	2–1	0–1	1–1	3–2	0–0	1–1	4–3	1–1	1–1	2–2	2–0	2–0		1–1	1–0	1–0	0–0	1–1	3–0	1–2	3–1
Preston North End	1–0	1–0	0–0	3–1	0–0	3–1	2–1	0–0	4–0	0–0	2–1	3–4	0–2	2–1	2–1	3–0		3–2	4–2	0–2	5–1	4–2	3–1	0–1
Rotherham United	2–2	1–1	3–3	1–0	0–1	2–0	2–0	4–1	2–0	3–0	0–1	1–1	2–1	1–2	1–1	1–2	1–1		1–0	0–1	2–0	0–2	3–1	2–1
Sheffield Wednesday	3–1	3–3	1–0	1–3	2–0	1–3	1–0	1–0	1–0	4–0	1–0	1–2	0–0	4–1	2–2	0–3	2–2	0–0		1–1	2–1	0–2	2–1	1–0
Shrewsbury Town	5–3	1–2	1–3	3–1	2–0	0–2	1–0	2–4	1–0	1–0	2–0	2–1	1–2	1–0	3–1	1–0	1–0	0–2	0–0		3–1	3–0	1–1	1–2
Southend United	0–2	4–0	2–0	0–2	2–0	1–1	2–0	1–2	2–2	5–2	4–1	1–3	2–2	0–0	0–0	3–3	0–2	1–2	2–1	1–3		3–0	2–2	2–1
Swindon Town	6–3	3–2	2–1	4–0	2–1	0–1	0–1	1–2	2–2	3–0	3–1	0–1	0–2	0–2	0–3	2–1	1–3	1–1	2–1	3–0	0–0		5–1	2–2
Walsall	4–1	2–0	0–1	2–3	1–0	1–0	1–1	1–1	4–0	2–0	2–0	0–0	0–1	1–1	2–2	3–1	3–1	5–1	2–2	2–0	2–3	1–1		2–2
Wrexham	3–1	3–0	2–1	1–1	1–1	1–0	1–1	1–3	2–0	1–0	1–1	2–1	1–0	1–1	3–0	1–0	1–2	3–0	3–0	2–3	2–2	2–0	0–3	

Updated to match(es) played on unknown. Source: Ian Laschke: Rothmans Book of Football League Records 1888–89 to 1978–79. Macdonald and Jane's, London & Sydney, 1980.
Legend: Blue = home team win; Yellow = draw; Red = away team win.

=== Maps ===
Locations of the Football League Third Division London teams 1975–1976
Locations of the Football League Third Division teams 1975–1976

== Fourth Division ==
Football League Fourth Division
- Season: 1975–76
- Champions: Lincoln City (1st title)
- Promoted: Northampton Town; Reading; Tranmere Rovers
- Failed re-election: None
- Matches: 552
- Goals: 1,442 (2.61 per match)
- Top goalscorer: Ronnie Moore (Tranmere Rovers), 34

Pos	Team	Pld	W	D	L	GF	GA	GAv	Pts	Promotion
1	Lincoln City (C, P)	46	32	10	4	111	39	2.846	74	Promotion to the Third Division
2	Northampton Town (P)	46	29	10	7	87	40	2.175	68	Promotion to the Third Division
3	Reading (P)	46	24	12	10	70	51	1.373	60	Promotion to the Third Division
4	Tranmere Rovers (P)	46	24	10	12	89	55	1.618	58	Promotion to the Third Division
5	Huddersfield Town	46	21	14	11	56	41	1.366	56	
6	Bournemouth	46	20	12	14	57	48	1.188	52	
7	Exeter City	46	18	14	14	56	47	1.191	50	
8	Watford	46	22	6	18	62	62	1.000	50	
9	Torquay United	46	18	14	14	55	63	0.873	50	
10	Doncaster Rovers	46	19	11	16	75	69	1.087	49	
11	Swansea City	46	16	15	15	66	57	1.158	47	
12	Barnsley	46	14	16	16	52	48	1.083	44	
13	Cambridge United	46	14	15	17	58	62	0.935	43	
14	Hartlepool	46	16	10	20	62	78	0.795	42	
15	Rochdale	46	12	18	16	40	54	0.741	42	
16	Crewe Alexandra	46	13	15	18	58	57	1.018	41	
17	Bradford City	46	12	17	17	63	65	0.969	41	
18	Brentford	46	14	13	19	56	60	0.933	41	
19	Scunthorpe United	46	14	10	22	50	59	0.847	38	
20	Darlington	46	14	10	22	48	57	0.842	38	
21	Stockport County	46	13	12	21	43	76	0.566	38	Re-elected
22	Newport County	46	13	9	24	57	90	0.633	35	Re-elected
23	Southport	46	8	10	28	41	77	0.532	26	Re-elected
24	Workington	46	7	7	32	30	87	0.345	21	Re-elected

(C) Champions; (P) Promoted

=== Results ===
Home \ Away	BOU	BAR	BRA	BRE	CAM	CRE	DAR	DON	EXE	HAR	HUD	LIN	NPC	NOR	REA	ROC	SCU	SOU	STP	SWA	TOR	TRA	WAT	WRK
AFC Bournemouth		1–1	2–1	3–0	3–0	1–0	1–2	0–1	1–0	4–2	1–0	1–1	2–0	0–0	0–1	2–1	1–0	3–3	2–0	2–0	0–0	4–2	4–1	1–0
Barnsley	2–0		1–1	1–1	4–0	1–1	1–0	0–1	0–0	3–1	2–3	0–1	3–1	3–1	4–2	2–1	1–0	2–0	2–2	0–0	0–0	1–0	1–0	0–0
Bradford City	0–1	2–1		1–1	1–2	4–1	2–0	3–4	0–0	1–2	2–2	1–5	3–0	1–2	1–1	3–0	0–0	1–1	1–2	0–0	3–1	3–0	1–0	1–0
Brentford	1–2	1–0	2–2		0–0	0–0	3–0	0–1	5–1	1–1	0–0	1–0	1–3	2–1	2–2	3–0	5–2	1–0	2–1	1–0	1–1	0–1	1–0	4–0
Cambridge United	0–1	1–1	0–0	2–1		1–1	1–0	3–3	0–1	4–0	0–0	2–4	0–1	0–1	2–2	0–0	2–2	2–2	0–1	3–1	2–1	3–3	4–1	4–1
Crewe Alexandra	1–0	1–1	1–3	1–0	1–2		2–0	1–2	0–0	0–0	0–2	2–3	4–0	0–1	3–3	0–0	1–0	4–0	3–1	2–1	6–0	1–0	2–2	0–0
Darlington	2–0	2–0	2–2	2–0	1–1	0–0		2–2	0–0	1–2	0–3	0–0	4–0	0–1	0–1	4–0	2–0	2–0	0–1	1–1	1–0	2–0	1–0	1–0
Doncaster Rovers	1–1	2–2	1–1	1–1	0–2	3–1	3–2		0–0	3–0	4–1	2–4	5–1	0–4	1–1	1–2	0–1	5–2	3–1	2–1	0–1	3–0	1–2	1–0
Exeter City	1–0	2–0	0–0	0–0	1–2	2–2	1–1	1–0		3–1	4–1	0–0	3–0	0–0	4–1	1–0	5–4	2–0	2–0	3–0	0–0	0–2	1–3	1–0
Hartlepool	1–1	1–0	2–2	1–0	2–2	1–3	2–3	2–1	2–1		1–1	2–2	4–1	3–0	2–4	3–0	1–2	0–0	3–0	1–0	0–1	1–2	2–1	0–2
Huddersfield Town	0–0	1–2	0–0	2–1	2–0	1–0	1–0	1–2	0–1	2–0		0–1	2–1	1–1	3–0	0–0	1–1	1–2	2–2	2–0	2–3	1–0	1–0	2–0
Lincoln City	1–0	2–1	4–2	3–1	3–0	2–0	2–1	5–0	4–1	3–0	0–0		4–1	3–1	3–1	2–0	3–0	6–0	2–0	4–0	4–2	2–2	5–1	4–1
Newport County	3–1	1–0	3–1	1–0	2–0	2–2	4–1	2–3	3–3	0–1	1–2	3–1		1–1	0–0	1–1	0–0	2–0	2–2	1–2	0–2	1–5	0–2	2–3
Northampton Town	6–0	5–0	4–2	3–1	4–2	2–1	3–2	2–1	3–1	5–2	1–1	1–0	3–0		4–1	1–1	2–1	1–0	4–0	0–0	2–2	1–1	3–0	2–1
Reading	2–1	0–0	2–1	1–0	1–0	3–1	4–1	0–1	4–3	1–0	2–0	1–1	1–0	1–0		2–0	1–0	1–0	5–0	1–0	0–0	5–0	3–0	1–0
Rochdale	2–2	0–0	0–0	1–2	1–1	0–1	1–0	1–0	0–1	1–1	0–0	0–0	4–3	0–2	0–0		1–1	2–0	2–3	2–1	2–2	4–1	2–1	1–1
Scunthorpe United	2–0	1–0	2–0	2–1	0–1	1–0	2–1	2–1	0–1	5–1	0–1	0–2	1–2	0–2	2–1	1–3		1–2	0–0	1–1	3–1	2–2	0–1	3–0
Southport	0–2	0–0	1–2	2–0	2–4	2–2	2–0	1–1	1–0	2–4	1–2	1–2	3–0	0–1	1–2	0–1	1–1		2–0	1–1	1–3	0–0	1–2	2–1
Stockport County	0–0	1–1	2–1	2–0	0–1	0–0	0–0	1–2	2–1	2–0	0–1	0–3	0–1	1–3	1–1	0–1	0–0	1–0		3–2	1–0	0–2	2–2	4–1
Swansea City	1–1	3–1	3–1	2–2	1–0	4–0	2–0	2–1	0–3	3–1	1–1	2–2	2–2	1–1	5–1	1–1	2–0	2–0	5–0		3–0	1–1	4–2	1–0
Torquay United	2–1	2–0	1–0	2–3	0–0	2–1	2–4	2–2	1–0	1–1	1–3	2–2	1–1	0–1	0–0	1–0	1–0	2–1	4–1	0–2		2–1	1–0	1–0
Tranmere Rovers	2–0	1–0	3–3	5–1	3–2	2–1	2–0	2–2	1–1	1–2	3–0	2–0	3–1	2–0	2–0	0–1	2–1	1–0	5–0	3–0	7–1		3–0	6–0
Watford	1–1	1–0	3–0	3–2	1–0	2–1	2–0	2–1	2–0	2–1	0–2	1–3	3–1	0–1	2–1	3–0	1–0	2–0	1–1	2–1	0–0	2–2		2–0
Workington	1–3	1–7	0–3	1–1	1–0	0–3	0–0	3–1	1–0	1–2	0–2	0–3	1–2	1–0	0–2	0–0	2–3	2–1	1–2	1–1	1–3	0–1	1–3	

Updated to match(es) played on unknown. Source: Ian Laschke: Rothmans Book of Football League Records 1888–89 to 1978–79. Macdonald and Jane's, London & Sydney, 1980.
Legend: Blue = home team win; Yellow = draw; Red = away team win.

=== Maps ===
Locations of the Football League Fourth Division London teams 1975–1976
Locations of the Football League Fourth Division teams 1975–1976

== Attendances ==
=== Division One ===
#	Football club	Home games	Average attendance
1	Manchester United	21	54,750
2	Liverpool FC	21	41,623
3	Aston Villa	21	38,874
4	Manchester City	21	34,280
5	Newcastle United	21	33,060
6	Leeds United	21	31,511
7	Derby County	21	28,350
8	Birmingham City	21	28,003
9	Tottenham Hotspur	21	27,836
10	West Ham United	21	27,417
11	Everton FC	21	27,115
12	Arsenal FC	21	26,945
13	Ipswich Town	21	25,366
14	Queens Park Rangers	21	23,850
15	Sheffield United	21	23,549
16	Middlesbrough FC	21	23,223
17	Wolverhampton Wanderers	21	22,951
18	Norwich City	21	22,760
19	Stoke City	21	22,314
20	Leicester City	21	22,049
21	Coventry City	21	19,370
22	Burnley FC	21	18,120

=== Division Two ===
#	Football club	Home games	Average attendance
1	Sunderland AFC	21	31,250
2	Bolton Wanderers	21	19,390
3	Chelsea	21	18,957
4	Southampton FC	21	17,648
5	West Bromwich Albion	21	17,226
6	Bristol City	21	16,204
7	Plymouth Argyle	21	14,800
8	Nottingham Forest	21	12,805
9	Notts County	21	12,414
10	Charlton Athletic	21	11,629
11	Luton Town	21	10,587
12	Blackburn Rovers	21	10,489
13	Portsmouth FC	21	10,472
14	Oldham Athletic	21	10,456
15	Bristol Rovers	21	10,022
16	Fulham	21	9,741
17	Blackpool FC	21	8,307
18	Carlisle United	21	8,279
19	Hull City	21	6,901
20	Oxford United	21	6,736
21	Leyton Orient	21	6,386
22	York City	21	5,413

== See also ==
- 1975-76 in English football
