= Brighton & Hove Albion F.C.–Crystal Palace F.C. rivalry =

Brighton–Crystal Palace rivalry
- Typical Brighton and Palace kits
- Other names: M23 derby A23 derby
- Sport: Football
- Location: Southern England
- First meeting: 25 December 1920; Southern Football League; Brighton & Hove Albion 0–2 Crystal Palace
- Latest meeting: 18 October 2026; Premier League; Brighton & Hove Albion 5–0 Crystal Palace
- Next meeting: 15 May 2027; Premier League; Crystal Palace v Brighton & Hove Albion
- Stadiums: Falmer Stadium (Brighton); Selhurst Park (Crystal Palace)

Statistics
- Total meetings: 146
- Most wins: Tied (52 each)
- All-time series: Brighton & Hove Albion: 52; Draws: 42; Crystal Palace: 52
- Largest victory: Crystal Palace 6–0 Brighton & Hove Albion; Third Division South, 11 February 1950

The Brighton & Hove Albion–Crystal Palace rivalry is between English football teams Brighton & Hove Albion and Crystal Palace. The matches played between these sides are sometimes nicknamed the A23 derby or the M23 derby by the media.

Although the two clubs have played each other since 1905, the rivalry did not become well-known until the mid-1970s. Roy Hodgson, former manager of Crystal Palace, has stated that he does not recall any rivalry with Brighton as a Palace fan in the 1950s–60s. The two clubs did not face each other from 1963 until 1974, when Palace's first game in the Third Division for ten years was at Brighton. Palace lost and the following season their first league defeat was also against Brighton. After failing to gain promotion in either season, in May 1976, Terry Venables (aged 33) was appointed manager of Crystal Palace and two months later, his former England and Tottenham Hotspur teammate Alan Mullery (aged 34) was appointed manager at Brighton. Under the guidance of their ambitious young managers, both clubs, the two best supported in the division, climbed from the Third Division to the First Division within three years.

The two teams are unusually distant for an English football rivalry (although for much of the rivalry – up until the promotion to the Football League of Crawley Town in 2011 – Crystal Palace were the closest team to Brighton), about 40 miles apart. The A23 and M23 derby names sometimes used by the media come from the A23 road and the M23 motorway between Sussex and south London.

As of 2026, the clubs are equal in their head-to-head results accounting for all trophies and tournaments, with Brighton performing slightly better in total league wins.

== Background ==
Brighton and Crystal Palace had both been founding members of the Football League Third Division in 1920, having transferred from the Southern Football League with other founding members; the two clubs had met in regular Southern League matches since 1906. During the 1940s and 1950s the clubs met 21 times in twelve years – including two memorable back-to-back matches on Christmas Day and Boxing Day, 1951. However, the animosity between the two sets of supporters only arose in the mid-to-late 1970s.

The teams had not met at all for 11 years, when they played each other on the opening day of the 1974-75 season in the Third Division, Palace having been relegated from the second tier the previous season. Brighton were then managed by Peter Taylor, following the recent departure of Brian Clough, and Palace by the flamboyant Malcolm Allison. Extra police were deployed to control the 26,000 crowd, far higher than Brighton's usual attendance, and there were multiple arrests and fighting between fans inside and outside the Goldstone Ground, with excessive drinking due to the hot weather blamed for the trouble. Brighton won 1–0, Palace winning the return fixture later that season 3–0.

The following season witnessed both clubs vying for promotion. The league game between the two sides at Selhurst Park was played in front of a crowd of over 25,000, Palace's highest home attendance for two years. Allison complained that Brighton had secured their 1–0 victory by their overly physical tactics. The Evening Argus reported that the game had been played in a "cup-tie atmosphere" with "the cut and thrust carried through with the zest of deadly rivals".

The return match at the Goldstone Ground saw over 33,000 crammed in to the stadium to see a third tier match. That game, which the home side won 2–0 with two goals by Sammy Morgan, is generally attributed as giving birth to Brighton's current nickname of 'Seagulls' (they had been known previously as "the Dolphins") – later adopted officially by the club (see below) – as it was sung on the terraces as a humorous counter-chant to Palace's 'Eagles!'. The home side's victory was overshadowed by more crowd trouble, as referee Ron Challis threatened to abandon the game due to Palace fans throwing smoke bombs and other missiles on the pitch.

Both teams narrowly missed out on promotion that year. In the summer of 1976, Terry Venables became Crystal Palace manager and Alan Mullery Brighton manager. The pair had spent time together on the field as players at Tottenham and Venables was second in command to Mullery's captaincy at the club; Mullery has described this power dynamic as a reason for the rivalry between them. Whilst at Tottenham, Venables reportedly did not have a good relationship with his manager Bill Nicholson, believing him to have a negative attitude that "drained him of enthusiasm". Venables also felt that he was not appreciated by Spurs fans, in contrast to Mullery, who was Nicholson's and the fans' favourite.

The two young managers were set the same task: promotion from the Third Division.

Comparative chart of league positions of Brighton and Palace in the Football League.

The first meeting between the clubs that season was the league match at The Goldstone on 2 October, which ended 1–1; during the game smoke bombs were thrown onto the pitch and play was stopped three times throughout the match.

The clubs were then drawn together in the first round of the FA Cup, played on 20 November at The Goldstone; the match ended 2–2. After the game, Mullery was critical of his opposite number, bemoaning what he perceived to be Palace's negative tactics.

A replay took place at Selhurst Park three days later; the match finished 1–1 after extra time and the teams faced a second replay. Brighton were described as dominating much of the play in the two games, which both attracted attendances of almost 30,000. This attendance figure was a significant increase on both club's averages for the season, with Palace averaging just 15,925 that season and Brighton 20,197.

The second replay, postponed twice due to bad weather, took place at Stamford Bridge on 6 December. Palace took the lead after 18 minutes through Phil Holder. Brighton dominated much of the game's remainder, with striker Peter Ward having a goal disallowed shortly after as he was adjudged to have handled the ball, although Palace's Jim Cannon later said that this only occurred due to him shoving the Brighton striker. In the 78th minute, Brighton were awarded a penalty which was converted by Brian Horton only to be disallowed as referee Ron Challis adjudged that players had encroached upon the penalty area. Horton retook the penalty and this time it was saved by the Palace keeper, Paul Hammond. The match ended 1–0 to Crystal Palace.

After the final whistle, Mullery approached Challis to discuss the decision and was escorted off the pitch by police while flicking 'v-signs' and swearing at the Palace supporters in the stands, one of whom had thrown a cup of coffee at him. The Brighton manager then allegedly entered the Palace dressing room, threw five pounds on the floor and told Venables: "Your team's not worth that." Mullery was fined £100 by the FA for bringing the game into disrepute.

On 12 March 1977, the two sides met again in the league at Selhurst and Palace ran out 3–1 winners. A crowd of 28,808, nearly double Palace's average for the season, was present.

That season both teams were promoted with Brighton finishing as runners up, two points in front of Palace. Brighton also changed their official nickname from the Dolphins to the Seagulls, in direct opposition to the Crystal Palace nickname the Eagles.

The rivalry continued with the clubs meeting with the same objective and same managers in the 1977–78 season and 1978–79 season, this time vying for a spot in the top flight of English football.

In 1978, Brighton missed out on promotion on goal difference, finishing in fourth place and well ahead of Crystal Palace in ninth, but the head-to-head battle continued the following season. Both of the league meetings between the two teams in 1977-78 finished level.

Brighton completed their 1978–79 campaign top of the league. Palace, though, still had a game in hand to play against Burnley due to postponements throughout the season; Palace won the match, played in front of 51,000 spectators, and took the title by one point. For the second time in three years, the two clubs had been promoted together. Palace also boasted the bragging rights head-to-head with Brighton that season, after they had defeated Brighton 3–1 at Selhurst, a win that would prove vital at the end of the season, while the return game in February was goalless.

The two clubs subsequently met in the top flight of English football in the 1979–80 season, and Brighton emerged with the bragging rights early in the season, by beating Palace 3–0 on Boxing Day 1979 at the Goldstone.

Mullery states that the rivalry was fuelled by both competition between the teams and directly between the managers. Terry Venables, highly controversially, left Palace in 1980 for Queens Park Rangers while Alan Mullery left Brighton in 1981.

Both clubs were relegated from the first division within several years, Palace in 1981 and Brighton in 1983. The two years that Brighton spent above Palace from 1981 to 1983 have since been the only years that Brighton have competed in a higher league than Crystal Palace.

Mullery went on to manage Crystal Palace for two seasons (1982–1984) and then returned to Brighton for the 1986–87 season.

== 1980s ==
The rivalry between the two clubs carried on throughout the 1980s. Following their joint promotion to the First Division in 1979, the teams met four times in the top flight with Palace failing to record a victory against Brighton.

In 1982, Crystal Palace chairman Ron Noades appointed Alan Mullery as Palace manager, which was met with hostility by Palace fans. Crowds at Selhurst dropped significantly partly as a result of the appointment, and Mullery's record against Brighton as Crystal Palace manager was poor, losing both his clashes against the Seagulls. Mullery eventually left the club in 1984.

With both sides back in the second tier, the 1985 match at Selhurst Park saw the end of Brighton favourite Gerry Ryan's career following a tackle by Palace defender Henry Hughton which broke the winger's leg in three separate places. The game was followed by some of the worst violence seen between the two sets of fans.

Brighton dominated the rivalry throughout much of the 1980s, with Palace earning their first win of the decade against Brighton in 1986 under the management of Steve Coppell, a 1–0 win that put an end to Brighton's promotion push that season.

Alan Mullery returned as Brighton manager in 1986, and on Boxing Day the same year, Palace earned a 2–0 victory against their former manager's team at Selhurst Park. Mullery left Brighton soon after, and they finished the season at the bottom of the table. Palace, after losing 2–0 to Brighton at the Goldstone amidst violent scenes in the crowd in late April 1987, missed out on the newly formed playoffs by two points.

Brighton earned promotion back to the Second Division in 1988, bringing back the rivalry with Palace after a season's absence.

In 1989, referee Kelvin Morton awarded five penalties in a Crystal Palace v Brighton game, all awarded in a 27-minute spell - a Football League record. Palace were awarded four of the penalties, and they missed three of them but still won the match 2–1, with a goal from Ian Wright and a successful penalty from Mark Bright enough to earn victory against 10 man Brighton. Crystal Palace earned promotion to the First Division that season, while Brighton remained a Second Division club.

== 1990s and 2000s ==
Brighton's off-the-field ownership problems in the 1990s led to the clubs only meeting four times in the league between 1990 and 2011, with Brighton struggling in the third and fourth tiers of English football for much of the 1990s. In both 1997 and 1998, Brighton nearly drifted out of the Football League altogether, finishing 91st out of 92 clubs in the football league in both seasons.

The league match between the two sides on 26 October 2002 at Selhurst Park was the first time the teams had met for 13 years. Palace ran out 5–0 winners. Brighton had their revenge three seasons later when a Paul McShane goal gave them a long-awaited victory at the home of their rivals.

== 2010s ==
The first game between the two teams at Brighton's new Falmer Stadium, in September 2011, was won by Crystal Palace 3–1, with former Brighton striker Glenn Murray scoring for Palace, after he had left Brighton for Palace on a free transfer that summer. It was the first league defeat Brighton had suffered at their new stadium however the team went on to finish the season in tenth position, seven places higher than Crystal Palace.

During the 2012–13 season, the two clubs met each other a total of four times, in both the league and the two-legged Championship play-off semi-final after the conclusion of the regular season.

In December 2012, Crystal Palace defeated Brighton 3–0 in the league at Selhurst Park, with two Palace goals coming from former Brighton striker Glenn Murray. Brighton had been reduced to 10 men after Lewis Dunk received a red card, and they could not stop an in-form Palace side.

In March 2013, Brighton exacted revenge and dispatched Palace in a 3–0 home win, a defeat that saw the Eagles embark on a horrific run of form towards the end of the season; it was Brighton's first home league win against Palace in 25 years.

The two teams met in the 2012–13 Championship play-off semi-finals, by virtue of Brighton finishing fourth and Palace finishing fifth in the league. Following an uneventful 0–0 draw between the teams at Selhurst Park, Crystal Palace won 2–0 away at Falmer Stadium and went on to gain promotion to the Premier League by defeating Watford 1–0 (after extra time) in the play-off final.

The second leg of Brighton's play-off tie with Crystal Palace was marred by a bizarre off-field incident. Human excrement was discovered smeared across the floor in the away dressing room toilets, in what was perceived to be an attempt to unsettle the opposition. Brighton's subsequent investigation failed to identify the perpetrator, although former Palace player Paddy McCarthy has since revealed that it was the Crystal Palace coach driver, stating that "The dressing room scandal at Brighton was thanks to our coach driver who couldn't control himself". Brighton manager Gus Poyet reacted furiously to the incident, and sent out an email to club staff demanding an explanation for the events that had unfolded. Shortly afterwards, Poyet was suspended by Brighton over an unrelated alleged breach of contract.

In the 2016–17 season, four seasons after the two clubs met in the play-offs, Brighton won promotion to the Premier League as runners-up to Newcastle United, bringing the rivalry back to the top division for the first time in 36 years, and to the Premier League for the first time since it was founded.

The first occurrence of the derby in the Premier League ended as an uneventful 0–0 draw at the Falmer Stadium on 28 November 2017. A point apiece for both sides left Brighton in 10th place, with Palace still rooted to the bottom of the table in 20th place. Former Palace striker Glenn Murray started the match for Brighton, having returned to the Seagulls for a second spell in 2016. However, the return of the derby was marred by disorderly behaviour from visiting supporters. Several stewards from both clubs suffered minor injuries as a result of fan behaviour, with one steward from each club hospitalised. Brighton, in collaboration with Sussex Police, had also made the decision to close stadium entry six minutes into the game due to fans forcing entry into the away end. The decision left some fans with tickets unable to enter the stadium. Sussex Police apologised a few days after the game for claiming that Palace fans had turned up to the ground with weapons, admitting that no such implements were found.

Brighton and Crystal Palace were drawn against each other for a tie in the third round of the 2017–18 FA Cup, played at Brighton's Falmer Stadium on 8 January 2018. This was the first match in England to use Video Assistant Referee (VAR) technology. Brighton won the match 2–1, with goals from Dale Stephens and Glenn Murray sending the Seagulls through to the fourth round for a tie against Middlesbrough. In the return Premier League fixture in April, the teams exchanged five goals in the first 34 minutes, with Palace racing into an early 2–0 lead, and winning the match 3–2.

The first match between the two teams the following season was another incident-filled encounter, held at Falmer Stadium on 4 December 2018. Glenn Murray again scored in the fixture, giving Brighton the lead early in the first half with a disputed penalty. Minutes later, appeals for a second Brighton penalty were turned down. In the resulting melee, Brighton defender Shane Duffy was sent off for a headbutt on Palace defender Patrick van Aanholt. Moments later, defender Leon Balogun was brought on as a substitute and scored with his first touch to put Brighton 2–0 up. In the final minute of first-half added time, another first-half substitute, Florin Andone, scored a solo goal to give 10-man Brighton a 3-0 half-time lead. This was the first time in Premier League history that two substitutes for one team had scored in a match before half time. Palace pulled a goal back late in the second half through a Luka Milivojević penalty, but Brighton were convincing winners.

In the second match between the two teams that season, held at Selhurst Park, Brighton were the winners again, with former Palace striker Glenn Murray scoring in the first half. Luka Milivojević scored a penalty early in the second half, but Anthony Knockaert's sublime strike from outside the box into the top left corner won the Albion the match, completing a league double over their rivals for the first time since the 1983-84 season.

The final derby of the decade came on 16 December 2019 at Selhurst Park. Neal Maupay scored the opener for Brighton early in the second half, but a sublime Wilfried Zaha strike rescued a point for Palace.

== 2020s ==
The first derby in the 2020s was on 29 February 2020 at the Amex. Jordan Ayew scored the winner for Crystal Palace midway through the second half to seal a 1–0 victory.

The second was on 18 October 2020 at Selhurst Park, played with no fans in attendance for the first time in the history of the fixture due to the COVID-19 pandemic. Palace took an early lead thanks to a Wilfried Zaha penalty before Alexis Mac Allister scored in the final minute to equalise for Brighton. However, Brighton then lost a man when Lewis Dunk was sent off for a two-footed tackle on Palace defender Gary Cahill. At the return fixture at the Amex on 22 February 2021, Christian Benteke scored from Andros Townsend's cross in the final moments of stoppage time to win the game 2–1 for Palace, despite Brighton being in control throughout the 90 minutes. In fact, across both games in the 2020–21 Premier League Season Palace only recorded four shots in contrast to Brighton's 45.

On 27 September 2021, in-form Brighton travelled to Selhurst Park knowing a win would take them to the top of the English league system for the first time in the club's history. Palace took a first half lead from a Wilfried Zaha penalty, but Neal Maupay equalised in the final moments of stoppage time to rescue a point. This was the third consecutive fixture between the sides in which a decisive goal was scored in the 90th minute or later. The game saw more off-field controversy as some Brighton fans broke through advertising hoardings to celebrate the equaliser on the pitch while there were confrontations between Palace fans and Brighton players as they headed down the tunnel.

On 18 October 2026, Brighton had its largest win in seven decades, 5–0, after scoring three goals in the first 10 minutes.

== Players who have represented both clubs ==
The following footballers have played for both Brighton & Hove Albion and Crystal Palace:

Player	First club	Years at first club	Years at second club
Charlie Chase	Brighton	1940–1942	1948–1950
Bert Addinall	Brighton	1953–1954	1954–1955
Kemy Agustien	Crystal Palace	2011 (loan)	2013–2015
Ade Akinbiyi	Brighton	1994 (loan)	2002–2003
Calvin Andrew	Crystal Palace	2008–2012	2009 (loan)
Trevor Benjamin	Crystal Palace	2001–2002 (loan)	2004 (loan)
Ken Bennett	Brighton	1950–1953	1953–1954
Gary Borrowdale	Crystal Palace	2002–2007	2009 (loan)
Tony Burns	Brighton	1966–1969	1973–1978
Steve Claridge	Crystal Palace	1988	2004
Paul Dickov	Brighton	1994 (loan)	2007 (loan)
Stephen Dobbie	Brighton	2012–2013	2013 (loan), 2013–2015
Scott Flinders	Crystal Palace	2006–2009	2007 (loan)
John Humphrey	Crystal Palace	1990–1995	1997
Paul Kitson	Crystal Palace	2000 (loan)	2002–2003
Roy Little	Brighton	1958–1961	1961–1964
Neil Martin	Brighton	1975–1976	1976
Dave Martin	Brighton	Youth–2004	2007–2008
Johnny McNichol	Brighton	1948–1952	1958–1963
Paul McShane	Brighton	2005–2006	2012 (loan)
Glenn Murray	Brighton	2008–2011, 2016–2021	2011–2015
Gary O'Reilly	Brighton	1984–1987, 1991–1992	1987–1991
John Phillips	Brighton	1980–1981	1982–1983
Simon Rodger	Crystal Palace	1990–2002	2002–2004
Dave Sexton	Brighton	1957–1958	1959
Neil Smillie	Crystal Palace	1975–1982	1982–1985
Jamie Smith	Crystal Palace	1999 (Youth)–2009	2009–2012
Steven Thomson	Crystal Palace	1994–2003	2008
Matthew Upson	Crystal Palace	2001 (loan)	2013 (loan), 2013–2014
Eric Young	Brighton	1982–1987	1990–1995, 1997

== Match history ==
=== Summary ===
As of 18 October 2026

Competition	Matches	Brighton wins	Draws	Crystal Palace wins
Division One / Premier League	23	8	9	6
Division Two / Championship	22	8	6	8
Division 3	10	3	2	5
Division Three (South)	52	21	12	19
League totals	107	40	29	38
Championship play-offs	2	0	1	1
FA Cup	5	2	2	1
Division Three (South) Cup	2	0	0	2
Full Members' Cup	2	1	0	1
Cup totals	9	3	2	4
Southern League Division One	20	7	7	6
United League	4	1	2	1
Western League	2	1	0	1
Non-league totals	26	9	9	8
Jubilee Fund	2	0	1	1
Total	146	52	42	52

=== League ===
Only English Football League and Premier League matches are shown. Home team scores are shown first.

Season	League division	Brighton & Hove Albion vs Crystal Palace				Crystal Palace vs Brighton & Hove Albion			
Season	League division	Date	Venue	Score	Attend.	Date	Venue	Score	Attend.
1920–21	Division Three (old)	25 December 1920	Goldstone Ground	0–2	14,000	27 December 1920	The Nest	3–2	22,000
1925–26	Division Three (South)	19 September 1925	Goldstone Ground	3–2	11,738	10 March 1926	Selhurst Park	2–1	5,871
1926–27	Division Three (South)	1 September 1926	Goldstone Ground	1–1	7,209	1 January 1927	Selhurst Park	2–0	14,346
1927–28	Division Three (South)	28 January 1928	Goldstone Ground	4–2	4,494	17 September 1927	Selhurst Park	1–1	13,557
1928–29	Division Three (South)	22 December 1928	Goldstone Ground	1–5	3,899	4 May 1929	Selhurst Park	1–0	22,146
1929–30	Division Three (South)	22 February 1930	Goldstone Ground	1–2	11,530	19 October 1929	Selhurst Park	2–2	13,882
1930–31	Division Three (South)	11 October 1930	Goldstone Ground	1–1	9,730	14 February 1931	Selhurst Park	0–1	16,986
1931–32	Division Three (South)	9 September 1931	Goldstone Ground	0–3	11,175	16 September 1931	Selhurst Park	2–0	12,071
1932–33	Division Three (South)	7 September 1932	Goldstone Ground	1–2	9,302	31 August 1932	Selhurst Park	5–0	13,704
1933–34	Division Three (South)	24 March 1934	Goldstone Ground	4–1	5,356	11 November 1933	Selhurst Park	2–1	10,562
1934–35	Division Three (South)	8 September 1934	Goldstone Ground	3–0	10,560	19 January 1935	Selhurst Park	3–0	11,189
1935–36	Division Three (South)	4 April 1936	Goldstone Ground	2–1	5,879	15 January 1936	Selhurst Park	4–0	3,039
1936–37	Division Three (South)	7 November 1936	Goldstone Ground	1–0	7,768	13 March 1937	Selhurst Park	2–0	16,255
1937–38	Division Three (South)	26 February 1938	Goldstone Ground	2–1	9,707	16 October 1937	Selhurst Park	3–2	19,121
1938–39	Division Three (South)	25 February 1939	Goldstone Ground	0–0	7,146	22 October 1938	Selhurst Park	1–0	18,999
1946–47	Division Three (South)	3 May 1947	Goldstone Ground	1–0	6,957	11 September 1946	Selhurst Park	1–0	11,988
1947–48	Division Three (South)	14 October 1947	Goldstone Ground	1–1	10,240	12 April 1948	Selhurst Park	0–0	16,463
1948–49	Division Three (South)	12 March 1949	Goldstone Ground	1–1	15,413	16 October 1948	Selhurst Park	0–2	15,170
1949–50	Division Three (South)	7 January 1950	Goldstone Ground	0–0	13,289	11 February 1950	Selhurst Park	6–0	13,973
1950–51	Division Three (South)	3 February 1951	Goldstone Ground	1–0	6,790	23 September 1950	Selhurst Park	0–2	17,800
1951–52	Division Three (South)	26 December 1951	Goldstone Ground	4–3	24,228	25 December 1951	Selhurst Park	1–2	15,323
1952–53	Division Three (South)	23 August 1952	Goldstone Ground	4–1	23,905	20 December 1952	Selhurst Park	2–1	9,922
1953–54	Division Three (South)	13 March 1954	Goldstone Ground	3–0	19,312	28 April 1954	Selhurst Park	1–1	12,439
1954–55	Division Three (South)	13 November 1954	Goldstone Ground	1–0	16,440	2 April 1955	Selhurst Park	1–0	11,814
1955–56	Division Three (South)	14 January 1956	Goldstone Ground	5–0	13,602	10 September 1955	Selhurst Park	1–2	20,159
1956–57	Division Three (South)	22 April 1957	Goldstone Ground	1–1	11,382	19 April 1957	Selhurst Park	2–2	15,514
1957–58	Division Three (South)	22 March 1958	Goldstone Ground	3–2	19,517	23 November 1957	Selhurst Park	2–4	15,757
1962–63	Division Three (old)	12 January 1963	Goldstone Ground	1–2	11,807	1 September 1962	Selhurst Park	2–2	18,464
1974–75	Division Three (old)	17 August 1974	Goldstone Ground	1–0	26,235	18 March 1975	Selhurst Park	3–0	18,799
1975–76	Division Three (old)	24 February 1976	Goldstone Ground	2–0	33,300	23 September 1975	Selhurst Park	0–1	25,606
1976–77	Division Three (old)	2 October 1976	Goldstone Ground	1–1	27,054	12 March 1977	Selhurst Park	3–1	28,677
1977–78	Division Two (old)	22 October 1977	Goldstone Ground	1–1	28,208	18 March 1978	Selhurst Park	0–0	26,305
1978–79	Division Two (old)	17 February 1979	Goldstone Ground	0–0	23,795	7 October 1978	Selhurst Park	3–1	33,685
1979–80	Division One (old)	26 December 1979	Goldstone Ground	3–0	28,358	5 April 1980	Selhurst Park	1–1	31,466
1980–81	Division One (old)	27 December 1980	Goldstone Ground	3–2	27,367	18 April 1981	Selhurst Park	0–3	18,792
1983–84	Division Two (old)	21 April 1984	Goldstone Ground	3–1	15,214	26 December 1983	Selhurst Park	0–2	13,781
1984–85	Division Two (old)	15 September 1984	Goldstone Ground	1–0	15,044	2 April 1985	Selhurst Park	1–1	8,025
1985–86	Division Two (old)	1 January 1986	Goldstone Ground	2–0	15,469	29 March 1986	Selhurst Park	1–0	9,124
1986–87	Division Two (old)	20 April 1987	Goldstone Ground	2–0	10,062	26 December 1986	Selhurst Park	2–0	10,365
1988–89	Division Two (old)	26 December 1988	Goldstone Ground	3–1	13,515	27 March 1989	Selhurst Park	2–1	14,384
2002–03	Division One	25 March 2003	Withdean Stadium	0–0	6,786	26 October 2002	Selhurst Park	5–0	21,796
2005–06	Championship	20 November 2005	Withdean Stadium	2–3	7,273	18 October 2005	Selhurst Park	0–1	22,400
2011–12	Championship	27 September 2011	Falmer Stadium	1–3	20,969	31 January 2012	Selhurst Park	1–1	17,271
2012–13	Championship	17 March 2013	Falmer Stadium	3–0	28,499	1 December 2012	Selhurst Park	3–0	20,114
2017–18	Premier League	28 November 2017	Falmer Stadium	0–0	29,889	14 April 2018	Selhurst Park	3–2	24,656
2018–19	Premier League	4 December 2018	Falmer Stadium	3–1	29,663	9 March 2019	Selhurst Park	1–2	24,972
2019–20	Premier League	29 February 2020	Falmer Stadium	0–1	30,124	16 December 2019	Selhurst Park	1–1	24,175
2020–21	Premier League	22 February 2021	Falmer Stadium	1–2	0 (Note: The match was played behind closed doors due to the COVID-19 pandemic in England.)	18 October 2020	Selhurst Park	1–1	0
2021–22	Premier League	14 January 2022	Falmer Stadium	1–1	30,675	27 September 2021	Selhurst Park	1–1	22,975
2022–23	Premier League	15 March 2023	Falmer Stadium	1–0	30,933	11 February 2023	Selhurst Park	1–1	24,827
2023–24	Premier League	3 February 2024	Falmer Stadium	4–1	31,345	21 December 2023	Selhurst Park	1–1	24,171
2024–25	Premier League	15 December 2024	Falmer Stadium	1–3	30,893	5 April 2025	Selhurst Park	2–1	24,564
2025–26	Premier League	8 February 2026	Falmer Stadium	0–1	31,179	9 November 2025	Selhurst Park	0–0	24,326
2026–27	Premier League	18 October 2026	Falmer Stadium	5–0		15 May 2027	Selhurst Park		
Overall		Brighton wins	Draws	Palace wins		Palace wins	Draws	Brighton wins	
Overall		29	13	12		26	16	11	

=== Other ===
Date	Venue	Score	Competition	Attendance
26 November 1932	Selhurst Park	1–2	FA Cup: Round 1	14,870
30 September 1936	Selhurst Park	3–2	Third Division South Cup	2,822
10 December 1938	Goldstone Ground	2–3	Third Division South Cup	3,877
20 November 1976	Goldstone Ground	2–2	FA Cup: Round 1	29,510
23 November 1976	Selhurst Park	1–1 (aet)	FA Cup: Round 1 replay	29,174
6 December 1976	Stamford Bridge	0–1	FA Cup: Round 1 replay 2	14,118
16 October 1985	Selhurst Park	1–3	Full Members' Cup: South Round 1 Group 4	2,207
18 February 1991	Goldstone Ground	0–2 (aet)	Full Members' Cup South Round 3	9,633
10 May 2013	Selhurst Park	0–0	Championship play-offs	23,294
13 May 2013	Falmer Stadium	0–2	Championship play-offs	29,518
8 January 2018	Falmer Stadium	2–1	FA Cup: Round 3	14,507

Brighton wins	Draws	Palace wins
3	3	5

== Honours ==
As of 27 May 2026

Competition	Brighton & Hove Albion	Crystal Palace
FA Cup	0	1
FA Charity/Community Shield	1	1
UEFA Conference League	0	1
Total	1	3

== See also ==
- Sports rivalry
- Local derbies in the United Kingdom
