= A49 derby =

Football rivalry

- Other names: The Marches derby The New Farm derby
- Location: West Midlands
- Teams: Hereford United; Shrewsbury Town
- First meeting: 15 April 1974; Hereford United 1 – 1 Shrewsbury Town
- Latest meeting: 3 November 2012; Hereford United 3 – 1 Shrewsbury Town

Statistics
- Total meetings: 28
- Most wins: Shrewsbury Town (13)
- All-time series: Hereford: 8 Drawn: 7 Shrewsbury: 13
- Largest victory: Shrewsbury Town 4 – 0 Hereford United (23 November 2010)

The A49 derby was a football rivalry between Hereford United and Shrewsbury Town, and was one of the fiercest lower league rivalries in England before Hereford United's dissolution in 2014.

== History ==
The derby was listed as the nineteenth fiercest rivalry in English football by The Daily Telegraph, with the two clubs last facing each other in the league during the 2011–12 season which concluded with Shrewsbury being promoted to League One and Hereford relegated to the Conference National. The last meeting to date was an FA Cup first-round tie the following season at Edgar Street, with Hereford winning 3–1.

Hereford United were subsequently wound-up at the High Court in December 2014. The phoenix club Hereford F.C. competed no higher than the National League North, three divisions below Shrewsbury, the rivalry is only likely to be renewed upon a draw in the FA Cup.

In November 2015, an FA Vase second round fixture between the newly formed Hereford F.C. and Shrewsbury-based West Midlands (Regional) League club Haughmond at Edgar Street was humorously given the title of "The New A49 Derby".

== Statistics ==
=== Head-to-head record ===
Competition	Played	Hereford United	Draw	Shrewsbury Town
League	20	4	5	11
FA Cup	3	2	1	0
Football League Cup	2	1	1	0
Football League Trophy	3	1	0	2
Total	28	8	7	13

=== Results ===
Date	Venue	Score	Competition
15 April 1974	Edgar Street	1–1	Third Division
16 April 1974	Gay Meadow	1–1	Third Division
21 August 1974	Edgar Street	1–1	Football League Cup
27 August 1974	Gay Meadow	0–1	Football League Cup
27 December 1975	Gay Meadow	2–1	Third Division
19 April 1976	Edgar Street	3–1	Third Division
5 November 1977	Gay Meadow	3–0	Third Division
2 January 1978	Edgar Street	1–1	Third Division
22 December 1992	Edgar Street	2–1	Football League Trophy
26 December 1992	Edgar Street	1–1	League Division 3
10 April 1993	Gay Meadow	1–1	League Division 3
27 December 1993	Edgar Street	0–1	League Division 3
2 April 1994	Gay Meadow	2–0	League Division 3
31 January 1996	Gay Meadow	4–1	Football League Trophy
17 October 2006	Edgar Street	1–2	Football League Trophy
11 November 2006	Gay Meadow	0–0	FA Cup
21 November 2006	Edgar Street	2–0	FA Cup
16 December 2006	Gay Meadow	3–0	League Two
28 April 2007	Edgar Street	0–1	League Two
13 January 2008	Edgar Street	3–1	League Two
23 February 2008	New Meadow	1–2	League Two
24 November 2009	Edgar Street	2–1	League Two
13 February 2010	New Meadow	3–1	League Two
23 November 2010	New Meadow	4–0	League Two
23 April 2011	Edgar Street	0–2	League Two
10 September 2011	New Meadow	3–1	League Two
28 January 2012	Edgar Street	0–2	League Two
3 November 2012	Edgar Street	3–1	FA Cup

== Crossing the Divide ==
Graham Turner has managed both clubs on two separate occasions. He began his managerial career at Shrewsbury in 1978, remaining there until 1984. After spells with Aston Villa and Wolverhampton Wanderers he was named manager of Hereford in 1995, remaining there until 2009. Another spell at Hereford followed in 2010 before his last managerial appointment to date at Shrewsbury between 2010 and 2014.

Players to have moved directly between the two clubs include:

- John Brough
- Nick Chadwick
- Howard Clark
- Scott Cooksey
- John Dungworth
- Ryan Esson
- Steve Guinan
- Johnny Halpin
- David Jenkins
- Lennel John-Lewis
- Carl Leonard
- Gary Leonard
- Steve Leslie
- Jon Narbett
- Ralph Oliver
- Marc Pugh
- Rob Purdie
- Ben Smith
- Mark Taylor
- Paul Tester
- Danny Thomas
- Andrew Tretton
