= Jun Nishida =

Japanese ceramic artist

Jun Nishida in front of his kiln

Jun Nishida (西田潤, Nishida Jun, 1977 – March 26, 2005) was a Japanese ceramicist. He is best known for his massive conceptual pottery pieces, which experiment with the material capacities of clay and the imaginative forms that ceramics could take amid the intense thermochemical conditions of the kiln. Throughout his brief yet productive career, Nishida pushed the boundaries of contemporary ceramics, challenging conventions of scale, abstraction, and method to produce a radically new visual language of pottery.

In his monumental series, Zetsu (絶) (2000-2005), Nishida melded porcelain pieces and powdered glaze into enormous agglomerations that would morph, crack, and distort in unpredictable fashion, which he proceeded to carve and chisel after removing from the kiln to produce evocative sculptural forms. The fourteen pieces in the series challenge the common perceptions of porcelain as a fragile and delicate material, and of glaze as an exterior treatment rather than a substrate in and of itself.

== Biography ==
Born in Osaka, Japan in 1977, Nishida studied ceramics at Kyoto Seika University, where he received BFA and MFA degrees in ceramics in 2000 and 2002. From 2000 onward, his work was featured in a number of solo and group exhibitions across Japan, including the Kyoto Municipal Museum of Art, Osaka Contemporary Art Center, Ibaraki Ceramic Art Museum, and the Museum of Contemporary Ceramic Art, Gifu. Nishida also received prizes at ceramic competitions across Asia and Europe, including the bronze prize at the 1st Korea International Ceramic Biennale in 2001, and the Grand Prix at the 53rd International Contemporary Ceramic Biennale in Faenza, Italy. He taught as a lecturer at Ikenobo Junior College and Kyoto Seika University.

== Body of work ==
Nishida is widely recognized for his radical and intense method of ceramics production, which he described as a process of "excavation" (kussaku). He began by creating large mold-cast porcelain pieces, often shaped in semicircular and tubular forms, which were then mixed with glaze and poured into spherical or cuboid containers. The potassium-feldspar glaze was notably used as a structural material in its powdered form, rather than a surface treatment as a slurry. The containment structures were then fired at temperatures between 1200 and 1300 degrees Celsius for three to four days at a time. After letting the kiln cool for several more days, Nishida would climb into the kiln, typically with the help of assistants, to remove the iron and brick framework using power tools. The artist then proceeded to vigorously smash, chisel, and hammer the matrix to reveal extruded forms and partially baked and molten portions of clay and glaze.

Nishida's practice grew out of a postwar avant-garde trend of Japanese ceramicists seeking to separate associations of functionality from ceramic arts and emphasize their works as primarily sculptural objets. The Kyoto-based Sōdeisha movement formed by ceramicist Kazuo Yagi, centered around resisting the canonical traditions of Japanese pottery and the treatment of ceramic works as vessels, serves as an important precursor to Nishida's work. Nishida's method not only resisted the categorical conventions of ceramic objects (as Yagi had done), but also challenged the fundamental perception of the ceramic process as ending at the moment of removal from the kiln by physically fracturing and reshaping the hardened object by hand. This latter aspect distinguishes Nishida from the historical avant-garde in ceramics. Nishida's visceral, dense evocation of porcelain pushes back against the material's traditional associations with fragility, lightness, and polish.

Nishida understood his creations as the results of organic processes, describing his ceramic works as "essentially copies of natural forms" and likening his practice to "how Mother Earth makes stones." His exploded forms are texturally diverse; smoothly glazed undulating surfaces suddenly transition into violent protrusions and untamed, jagged edges. When viewed up close, the surfaces recall icebergs, patterns in the soil, rock formations and other features of the natural landscape. Nishida embraced unpredictability as part of the artistic process, working against the pursuit of precision and coherence often associated with ceramics. Instead, he allowed the material to morph and come into its form through a combination of human and non-human forces. Even with the understanding of the works as organic and living entities, Nishida still treated his pieces with chemical interventions to stabilize their forms. These synthetic adhesives yellowed, crystallized, and become opaque over time, thus requiring intensive conservation work to not only maintain the structural form of the objects, but their surface quality and white appearances as well.

=== Zetsu (2000-2005) ===
Nishida's best known body of work is the Zetsu (絶) series, which is emblematic of his dynamic and embodied avant-garde style. In Japanese, the character 絶 is typically used as a prefix or suffix in phrases that denote the extreme or absolute.

To create these works, Nishida and his team created shell structures out of brick and sheet iron to fill the space of the kiln, which were then filled with potassium-feldspar glaze powder. Within this dry mass, Nishida inserted several pre-cast porcelain pieces in varied arrangements in differently sized and shaped containers; in Zetsu No. 3 (Museum of Modern Art, Wakayama) the porcelain slices are arranged in a tight spiral structure, resulting in a nautilus-like structure when cracked open, while Zetsu No. 2 (Museum of Contemporary Ceramic Art, Gifu) features a semicircular porcelain form enveloped by the powdered glaze, partially concealed within an ovoid structure. The pieces from this series are particularly massive among Nishida's oeuvre, many of them clocking in at over 1,000 kilograms. At times, Nishida had to break the kiln door and walls in order to excavate the works. Certain areas of the sculptures seem slippery to the touch, or even appear to be frozen in place while dripping or stretching across surfaces. Others are rough and powdery, articulated through sharp angles and chipped edges.

Seven of the fourteen works of the Zetsu series are found in collections in the United States. In 2011, the Museum of Fine Arts, Boston acquired Zetsu No. 8, the largest work of the series which is displayed in three separate vitrines. The components are spotlit in a darkened gallery to dramatically accentuate their textural qualities. Combined, they weigh over 1,360 kilograms.

== Death and legacy ==
Nishida died on March 6, 2005, in an electric kiln explosion at the age of 28 while working with local artisans in Java, Indonesia. He had been building communal gas kilns in several villages in Java and Bali to encourage the continuation preservation of the distinctive perbot wheel throwing tradition on the islands, where clay is modeled upon a slanted wheel.

The monograph on the Zetsu series, first published in 2006, was re-issued in 2018 after Nishida’s work received increased attention in the years following his death.

== Collections ==
- Museum of Contemporary Ceramic Art, Gifu
- Kyoto Seika University
- Museum of Modern Art, Wakayama
- Minneapolis Institute of Art
- Museum of Ceramics, Faenza, Italy
- World Ceramic Expo, Korea
- Museum of Fine Arts, Boston
- Brooklyn Museum,
- Ackland Art Museum
