= Disher (surname) =

Disher is a surname. Notable people with the name include:

- Brooke Disher (born 2004), Canadian ice hockey player
- Catherine Disher (born 1960), Canadian actress and voice actress
- Eve Disher (1894–1991), British artist
- Garry Disher (born 1949), Australian author of crime fiction and children's literature
- John H. Disher (1921–1988), American aeronautical engineer and NASA manager
- Karen Disher (born 1972), American storyboard artist and film director
- Matt Disher (born 1976), Canadian lacrosse goaltender

Fictional character

- Randy Disher, fictional character on the television series Monk
