= St Patrick's GAA =

St Patrick's GAA may refer to:

- St Patrick's GAA (Donabate), a sports club in Fingal, Ireland
- St Patrick's GAA (Kerry), a sports club in East Kerry, Ireland
- St Patrick's GAA (Kilkenny), a sports club in Ballyraggett, Ireland
- St Patrick's GAA (Limerick), a former sports club
- St Patrick's GAA (Down), a sports club in Lisburn
- St Patrick's GAA (Louth), a sports club in Lordship near Dundalk, Ireland
- St Patrick's GAA (Meath), a sports club in Stamullen, Ireland
- St Patrick's GAA (Palmerstown), a sports club in South Dublin
- St Patrick's GAA (Sligo), a sports club in Dromard and Skreen, Ireland
- St Patrick's GAA (Tipperary), a sports club in Drangan and Cloneen, Ireland
- St Patrick's GAA (Wicklow), a sports club in the Irish town of Wicklow

== See also ==
- All Saints GAC, a descendant of a sports club known as St Patrick's which existed from 1959 to 1963
- Dromintee St Patrick's GAC, a sports club
- Lisbellaw St Patrick's GAA, a sports club
- Mayobridge GAA, a sports club occasionally referred to as St Patrick's
- Round Towers GAA (Kildare), formerly known as St Patrick's
- St Dominic's GAA, a sports club in Knockcroghery, Ireland, created from the merging of several clubs, including St Patrick's
- St Patrick's Carrickcruppen GFC, a sports club
- St Patrick's GFC, Cullyhanna, a sports club
- St Patrick's GFC, Donagh, a sports club
