= Duncan's Dam =

Coordinates: 54.53059°N 6.06394°W

Duncan's Dam is a dam situated in Lisburn, County Antrim, Northern Ireland, near the Thiepval Army Barracks. It was used until 1941 as a water supply for Lisburn. The dam is now open to the public - there is a path around the water and a playground at the north end. The parking is free.

== History ==
Duncan's Reservoir was in operation prior to 1876 as it appears on the 1876 map. In 1925 a pumping plant was installed at Duncan's Dam using a diesel engine pump. In 1930 an electrically driven centrifugal pump was installed and in 1941 both pumps were inoperative and Duncan's Dam ceased to be used as a town water supply.

== Flora and fauna ==
The dam is home to ducks, seagulls, swans, Eurasian jay, squirrels, rats and bats.
