= Denys Ovenden =

British illustrator (1922–2019)

Denys Ovenden (1 April 1922 – 26 November 2019) was a British natural history illustrator working principally in watercolour.

== Biography ==
Ovenden's preoccupation with drawing began very early, probably around the age of three, since there are drawings on the fly-leaves of books from that period. His natural history interest began around the age of six.

He began his studies at Hornsey College of Art in 1938, with a five-year break from 1942 to December 1946 in the Royal Engineers, most of which was spent in North Africa and Italy. In 1950 he began working as a freelance illustrator, for London Zoo, The Radio Times, Crawfords Advertising Agency and Collins. A lot of time was also spent working with fellow ex-students at the Waverly Studio.

In 1961 Ovenden went to work on the part-work Understanding Science, where he met Michael Chinery, who became a friend. With Chinery he began a new phase of work for William Collins, first on Field Guide to the Insects of Britain & Northern Europe, then the ground-breaking Reptiles & Amphibians of Britain & Europe. This was followed by a number of other books for Collins, including entry-level hand guides to Wild Animals and The Sea Coast.

In 1987 he prepared 10 plates for the Harley Books publication Grasshoppers and Allied Insects of Britain and Ireland. There followed the Collins Guide to Freshwater Life and a small share in the Collins Fungi Guide. Ovenden was commissioned by the Open University to prepare a poster accompanying David Attenborough's BBC series Life in Cold Blood. After a period of 15 years' work, Galápagos, a Guide to the Animals and Plants finally went to print after the addition of illustrations of two other recently discovered rodents and the elusive pink iguana.

Watercolour was the basic medium for his work, with occasional gouache for highlighting or detail. His preferred working surface was a "fashion" type board, CS2 "not surface" being the favourite.

Ovenden used a body-live, pinned, or preserved specimen to work from. He also used photographs, although these vary greatly in terms of colour bias. He used textbook or specialist handbooks to confirm details of mouth parts, wing venation, and other identification features.

Ovenden died in November 2019 at the age of 97.

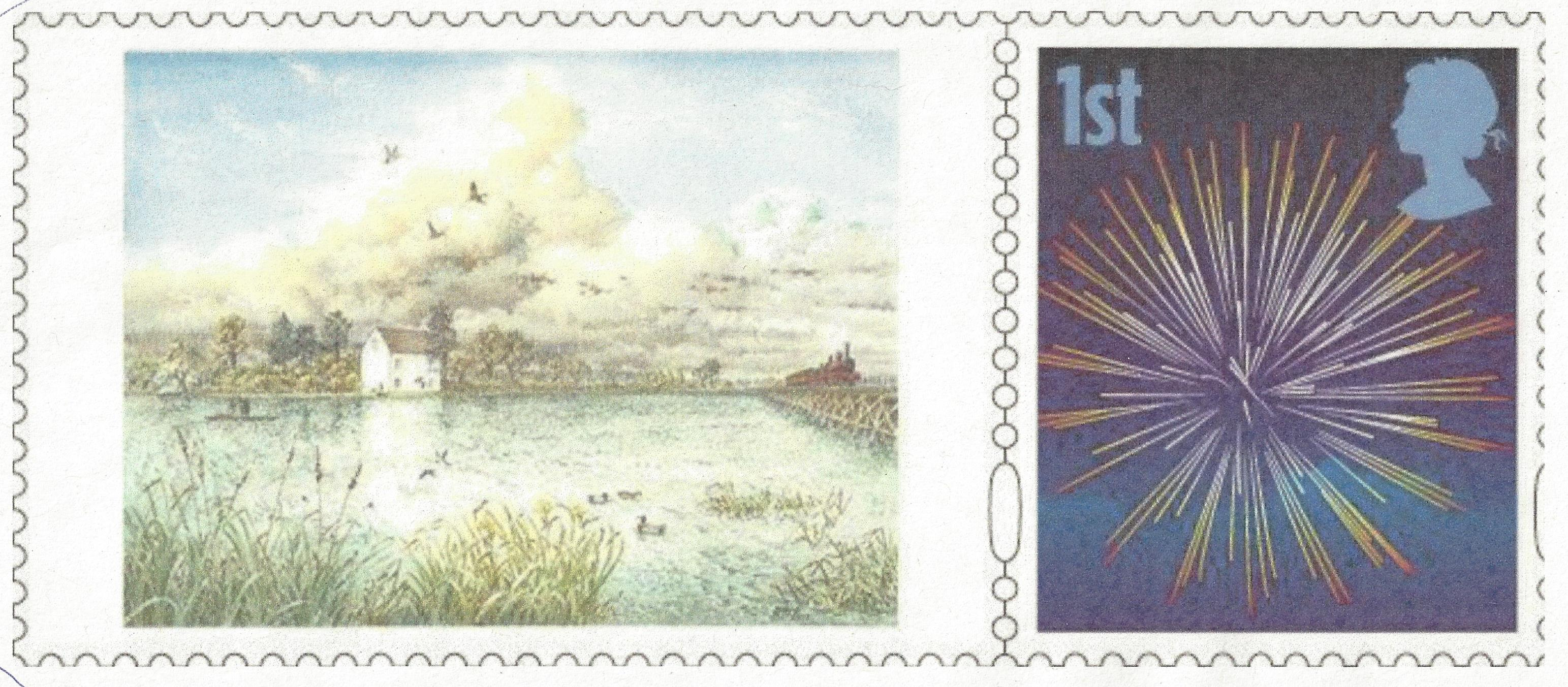
The painting of Ifield Mill by Denys Ovenden (circa 1848 - showing a Jenny Lind steam train crossing the wooden trellis viaduct across the millpond en route from Crawley to Horsham) was used to create a Royal Mail postage stamp.

An illustration of Ifield Water Mill in West Sussex was painted by Ovenden in 2015 and shows a scene from 1848 when the railway between Crawley and Horsham crossed the millpond on a wooden trellis viaduct. The painting subsequently appeared on a limited edition Royal Mail postage stamp.
