= Dante Leonelli =

American artist (1931–2024)

- Born: Dante William Leonelli; September 15, 1931; Chicago, Illinois, U.S.
- Died: September 2, 2024 (aged 92); London, England
- Known for: Pioneer of kinetic light sculpture
- Movement: Contemporary art, kinetic art

Dante William Leonelli (September 15, 1931 – September 2, 2024) was an American pioneer of kinetic light sculpture and a tutor at Hornsey College of Art and the Royal College of Art.

== Life and career ==
In 1968, Leonelli formed the Continuum group with artists Michael McKinnon and Robert Janz. Their group exhibition toured Sheffield, Hull, Manchester and Oxford, culminating in the first exhibition of kinetic light art to be shown at the Hayward Gallery.

Leonelli later proposed Eco Halos, which monitored and reflected changing levels of environmental traffic and air pollution. Leonelli has work in national and international collections.

Leonelli died in London on September 2, 2024, at the age of 92.
