= Moira Huntly =

British artist (born 1932)

- Born: 1932 (age 93–94); Motherwell, Scotland
- Education: Harrow School of Art; Hornsey College of Art
- Known for: Painting
- Website: https://www.moirahuntly.com/

Moira Gay Huntly (born 1932) is a British artist and author, known for her paintings of landscapes, buildings and maritime subjects

== Biography ==
Huntly was born in Motherwell in North Lanarkshire and, from 1948 to 1953, was a student at the Harrow School of Art and then studied at the Hornsey School of Art for a year. For the next six years, Huntly worked as a teacher in Maldon and then in Worcester before concentrating on her art. She became a prolific exhibitor both in Britain and abroad, especially in group shows, and won a number of awards.

Huntly participated in group exhibitions at galleries in Bath, at Stow-on-the-Wold, with the Société des Pastellistes Français in Paris, at the FCA Gallery in Vancouver and at the Mystic Maritime Museum of Connecticut. From 1990 onwards Huntly has been a regular exhibitor at venues in Wales, notably in numerous group exhibitions at the Albany Gallery in Cardiff, at Oriel Tegfryn in Menai Bridge and also at St David's Hall in Cardiff. An exhibition of her Welsh landscapes were shown at Mold in 1978 and also in a solo exhibition at the Royal West of England Academy in 2003. Other solo exhibitions were held at Theatr Clwyd and in Bristol.

Among the awards won by Huntly are the 1985 Winsor & Newton Award, the first prize in the 1986 Laing National Painting Competition and both the 1992 and 1993 Manya Igel Fine Arts Award. Huntly is a member of the Royal Society of Marine Artists, the Royal West of England Academy, the Royal Institute of Painters in Water Colours and is a former president of The Pastel Society. The National Museum Cardiff holds examples of her paintings.

== Published works ==
- Imaginative Still Life, A & C Black, 1983
- Painting and Drawing Boats, A & C Black, 1985
- The Artists Drawing Book, David & Charles, 1994
- Moira Huntly's Sketchbook Secrets, David & Charles, 2005
- Learn to Paint Gouache
