= Joseph Darracott =

Joseph Corbould Darracott (22 February 1934–6 March 1998) was a British writer, art historian, editor and museum curator who for 14 years was Keeper of Art at the Imperial War Museum in London.

Born in 1934 at Aldershot in Hampshire into a well-known family of bakers who supplied the Royal Family at the nearby Royal Pavilion, Darracott was the son of Joseph Stuart Darracott (1885-1965), of The Laurels, Cargate Avenue, Aldershot, a baker and confectioner, and Henrietta (1891-1993), née Hoey, from Craigellachie, Moray, Scotland, who was a certificated art teacher and assistant technical superintendent in the Women's Royal Air Force during the First World War. He was educated at Bradfield College and from 1954 at Lincoln College, Oxford where he read History. He completed his training at the Institut d'Art et d'Archéologie at Sorbonne University in Paris before being appointed as Keeper of the Rutherston Collection at Manchester City Art Gallery from 1961. In 1959 he married Britt-Marie Holm with whom he had two sons and a daughter.

From 1964 to 1969 he was Lecturer in Art History at Hornsey College of Art during which period he witnessed the famous 1968 sit-in at the college by students in what was described as "perhaps the most prominent manifestation in England of the revolutionary spirit which swept universities all over Europe in the late Sixties."

From 1969 to 1983 Darracott was Assistant Director and Keeper of Art at the Imperial War Museum in London. In 1971 he was one of the original founders of National Heritage, an organisation which supports and promotes museums in Britain and which since 1973 has awarded the Museum of the Year Award. In 1986 he became editor of Museum News; among his various articles were biographies for the Oxford Dictionary of National Biography. He wrote the catalogue for the exhibition 'All for Art: the Ricketts and Shannon Collection' at the Fitzwilliam Museum in Cambridge in 1979. His books include The First World War in Posters (1974); The World of Charles Ricketts (1980); England's Constable: the Life and Letters Of John Constable (1985); A Cartoon War: the Second World War in Cartoons (1990); Art Criticism (1991) and Letters from Artists (1997).

Joseph Darracott died suddenly in London in 1998 aged 64.
