= Stefana McClure =

Irish visual artist (born 1959)

- Born: 1959 (age 66–67)

Stefana McClure (born 1959) is an Irish visual artist.

== Life ==
Stefana McClure was born in Lisburn, Northern Ireland, in 1959. She grew up in Belfast during "the Troubles". and it influences her work. She went to art college in London where she graduated in 1984 with a BA in sculpture from Hornsey College of Art before moving to Japan for twelve years. There she completed post-graduate studies in paper making at Kyoto Seika University having won the Monbusho Scholarship. From there McClure moved to New York.

Her work is included in museums and public collections across the US, Germany, Austria and the United Kingdom.

She is married to fellow artist Jill Baroff.

== Solo exhibitions ==
- Arróniz Arte Contemporáneo, Mexico City (2015)
- Bartha Contemporary, London (2017)
- Sleeper, Edinburgh, Scotland (2017)
- Josée Bienvenu Gallery, New York (2018)
