= Kathleen Horsman =

British artist

Kathleen Finlay Horsman
- Born: 1911; London
- Died: 1999 (aged 87–88); Edinburgh
- Education: Hornsey School of Art; Royal College of Art
- Known for: Pottery

Kathleen Finlay Horsman MBE (1911–1999) was a British artist, potter and teacher who, although born and brought up in London, spent the majority of her career in Edinburgh.

== Biography ==
Horsman was born in London and attended Hornsey High School before studying at the Hornsey School of Art from 1929 to 1933 and then at the Royal College of Art until 1937. After she graduated from the Royal College, Horsman worked as a pottery teacher at the Liverpool School of Art until 1942 when she was appointed to a senior lecturer post at the Edinburgh College of Art. Alongside her college duties, Horsman maintained a studio in the West Bow area of Edinburgh and exhibited her pottery and paintings with the Society of Scottish Artists, the Royal Scottish Academy, the Scottish Society of Women Artists and with the Saltire Society. She also exhibited and lectured abroad, notably in New York in the 1950s and, later, in Peru. Horsman was awarded the MBE and a memorial exhibition of her work was held at the Scottish Gallery in Edinburgh during 1999.
