= Eileen Chandler =

British artist

- Born: Eileen Harris; 10 June 1904; London, England
- Died: 28 January 1993 (aged 88); London, England
- Education: Hornsey School of Art; Royal Academy Schools
- Known for: Painting

Eileen Chandler (née Harris; 10 June 1904 – 28 January 1993) was a British painter and illustrator, notable for her portrait work.

== Biography ==
Chandler was born in London and studied art at the Hornsey School of Art from where she won a scholarship to the Royal Academy Schools. In 1930 she married Roland Chandler who was an illustrator for The Strand Magazine and who died during World War II. After the war, although based at Hampstead and then Putney in London, Eileen Chandler spent many years travelling and working away from Britain. After her work was featured in the Illustrated London News, Chandler spent time in America creating watercolour portraits of Hollywood film stars and their children, which included a notable portrait of the then three year old Liza Minnelli. In Sweden she received numerous portrait commissions, often of children but also of members of the Swedish Royal Family, notably of Queen Sylvia. Although Chandler was better known abroad than in Britain, a solo exhibition of her landscapes and portraits was held at the Guy Morrison Gallery in London during 1988.
