= St. Patrick's Academy, Lisburn =

Coordinates: 54.5100°N 6.0678°W

St. Patrick's Academy

Location
- Ballinderry Road; Lisburn; Lisburn, County Antrim, BT28 1TD; Northern Ireland

Information
- School type: Secondary
- Religious affiliation: Roman Catholic
- Established: 1966
- Local authority: Education Authority (South Eastern)
- Principal: G McCann
- Teaching staff: 30
- Gender: Girls and boys
- Age range: 11-18 years
- Enrollment: 530 approx.
- Website: www.stpatsni.co.uk

St. Patrick's Academy is a Catholic, co-educational, all-ability secondary school in Lisburn, Northern Ireland.

== History ==
The academy was established in 1966 and in 2016 celebrated the 50th anniversary of its establishment. New facilities opened in 2018.

== Curriculum ==
Pupils in Key Stage 4 follow a common ‘core curriculum’ of seven subjects, but can choose from up to fifteen other subjects. All mainstream pupils are entered for GCSE in English, Maths, RE and Learning for Life and Work. Pupils can then choose to study other GCSEs, including Science, Technology, History, Geography, Spanish, Business Communication Studies, Home Economics, Art, Media Studies, Motor Vehicle Studies, Music, PE, ICT and Health & Social Care.

All sixth form pupils study a minimum of three A level subjects. These A levels can be a mix of “General” or “Applied” subjects and lead on to third level education.

The Academy is the only school in Northern Ireland to be awarded a grant from the “Friends of the Classics” to develop a Classics and Latin course which is offered to all our first year pupils.

The academy is a member of the Lisburn Area Learning Community (LALC) which links it with other local schools and the further education college.
