= Lisburn Racquets Club =

The Lisburn Racquets Club is a sports club in Lisburn, Northern Ireland. The club was formed in 1932 by the members of Lisburn Cricket Club to keep their members together during the winter months. It played in the British Legion Hall until the late 1950s and then moved to the Black Hall on the Hillhall Road. It incorporates Alpha Badminton Club, Lisburn Racquets Squash Club & Hilden Tennis Club.

In the 1960s it fund raised with the members of Hilden Tennis Club, with whom it had many members in common and with grant aid from the Department of Education it built the first stage of the current club. Play started here in November 1971.

A number of extensions have been added over the years – the major one being the addition of a 12 court badminton hall in 1996 with the help of Lottery Funding. This hall is also used by ten schools during the day and for netball and football – one of its current users being the Manchester United F.C. Academy.

Alpha is the largest badminton club in Ireland and over the last 15 years has won the All-Ireland Senior Cup 10 times. In doing so it qualified to represent Ireland in the Europe Cup – a competition for the champion club teams of all the European countries.

Alpha is divided into a number of sections decided mainly by the standard of player and partly by age. The Senior Club plays on Tuesday evenings with players of approximately League Division 1 standard. The Minor Club plays on Thursday evenings with players ranging from League Division 2 to Division 6 standard. The Tyros Club plays on Wednesday evenings with players from League Divisions 7 to 9 standard.

It has over 550 children divided into 10 sections playing on Friday evenings and on Saturdays from 9.00 – 6.00 with 30 league teams playing in the Ulster Juvenile Leagues.

The three adult sections have 13 teams in the leagues with entries also in the All-Ireland Cup competitions. The Senior section has many current Irish International players, all of the Northern Commonwealth Games team and many promising junior players many of whom have played for Ireland.

Each year Club Championships are held for most of the sections of the Club with preliminary rounds during the season and about fifty finals on a Saturday at the end of the season – late March or early April depending on when Easter falls.
