= Murder of Daisaku Chiba =

2007 murder case in Sakyō-ku, Kyoto, Japan

- Location: Sakyō-ku, Kyoto, Japan
- Date: 15 January 2007; 19 years ago 7:45 p.m. (Japan Standard Time)
- Victims: Daisaku Chiba, aged 20

On 15 January 2007, 20-year-old Daisaku Chiba (千葉大作, Chiba Daisaku), an aspiring manga artist and first year student at Kyoto Seika University, was stabbed after bicycling home from school. He later died in the hospital. The murder has remained unsolved.

== Background ==
Chiba was a 20-year-old from Sendai. A lifelong artist, he attended the Kyoto Seika University's Manga Department as a first year student.

== Murder ==
On 15 January 2007, at around 7:45 p.m., Chiba was bicycling home on a sidewalk in Sakyō-ku, a ward of Kyoto, where a man, described as between 20 and 30 years of age, was reported by witnesses to have approached Chiba, swaying from side to side while yelling obscenities at him. The man proceeded to stab him over a dozen times, including in the chest and stomach. Chiba later died at the hospital.

== Investigation ==
Chiba's professors and classmates created and distributed an informational manga, detailing about his life and raising awareness to the public. Authorities have received 1,350 pieces of information relating to the murder.

In 2022, the National Police Agency offered up to 3 million yen for information related to the murder. Tissues were handed out by police officers containing the perpetrator's sketches at the Kokusaikaikan Station. This practice has been done multiple times in the past as an attempt to receive investigation relating to the murder, although it has remained unsolved.

== See also ==
- List of unsolved murders (2000–present)
