= Daphne McClure =

British artist (1927–2023)

- Born: 1927; Helston
- Died: 18 October 2023 (aged 95–96); Penzance
- Education: Redruth Art School; Hornsey College of Art; Central School of Arts and Crafts
- Known for: Painting

Daphne McClure (1927 – 18 October 2023) was an English artist who is notable for her paintings of her native Cornwall.

== Biography ==
McClure was born in Helston and studied at the local Redruth Art School before continuing her training at Hornsey College of Art in London. She went on to study at the Central School of Arts and Crafts before working at the Royal Opera House, ROH, in Covent Garden. McClure worked in the production department of the Opera House for many years as both a costume and set designer. In 1976 she left the ROH and moved to Porthleven in Cornwall to concentrate on her painting. There she became a member of both the Newlyn Society of Artists and the Penwith Society of Artists. She painted local landscapes often featuring derelict tin mining sites, small towns and harbours.

Works by McClure were included in the exhibition, Some of the Moderns at the Belgrave Gallery in 1990 and in the Artists from Cornwall show at the Royal West of England Academy in 1992. A solo show of her work was held at the Penwith Gallery during 1996 and 1997 and she twice won awards at the Newlyn Contemporaries exhibition in the late 1980s.

McClure died on 18 October 2023, at the age of 96.
