= Dorothy King (artist) =

British artist, curator and teacher (1907–1990)

- Born: 1907; London, England
- Died: 1990 (aged 82–83)
- Education: Hornsey School of Art; Slade School of Art
- Known for: Portrait and figure painting

Dorothy King (1907–1990) was a British artist, curator and teacher. As an artist she was known for her portrait and figure paintings.

== Biography ==
King was born in London and studied at the Hornsey School of Art and at the Slade School of Art where she was taught by Randolph Schwabe. During World War II King worked as a Welfare Officer and as the supervisor of a rest centre in the East End of London. In 1947 she was elected a member of the Royal Society of British Artists, RBA. From 1959 King was the temporary keeper of the RBA Galleries in Suffolk Street in central London and from 1961 was the keeper of the South London Art Gallery, now known as the South London Gallery, in Camberwell. King also taught part-time classes at the Southwark Arts Centre. She retired from the South London Art Gallery in 1974 to concentrate on painting, although she continued to teach at Southwark for a time. During her artistic career King exhibited at the Royal Academy in London, with the New English Art Club, the Society of Women Artists and the Glasgow Institute of Fine Art. The South London Art Gallery held a retrospective exhibition to mark her retirement in 1974 and the Mall Galleries held a memorial show in 1992.
