= Samuel McCloy =

Irish artist (1831–1904)

- Born: 13 March 1831; Lisburn, County Antrim
- Died: 4 October 1904 (aged 73); Balham, London
- Education: Belfast School of Design
- Alma mater: Central School of Art
- Known for: Figure & genre painting
- Spouse: Ellen Lucy Harris

Samuel McCloy (13 March 1831 – 4 October 1904) was an Irish artist who trained at Belfast School of Design and later at Somerset House. He exhibited widely in group shows across the British Isles and was known for his watercolours, genre paintings, still-life and landscapes. McCloy was also a commercial designer, illustrator, and an educator who was for a time Master at Waterford School of Art.

== Early life ==
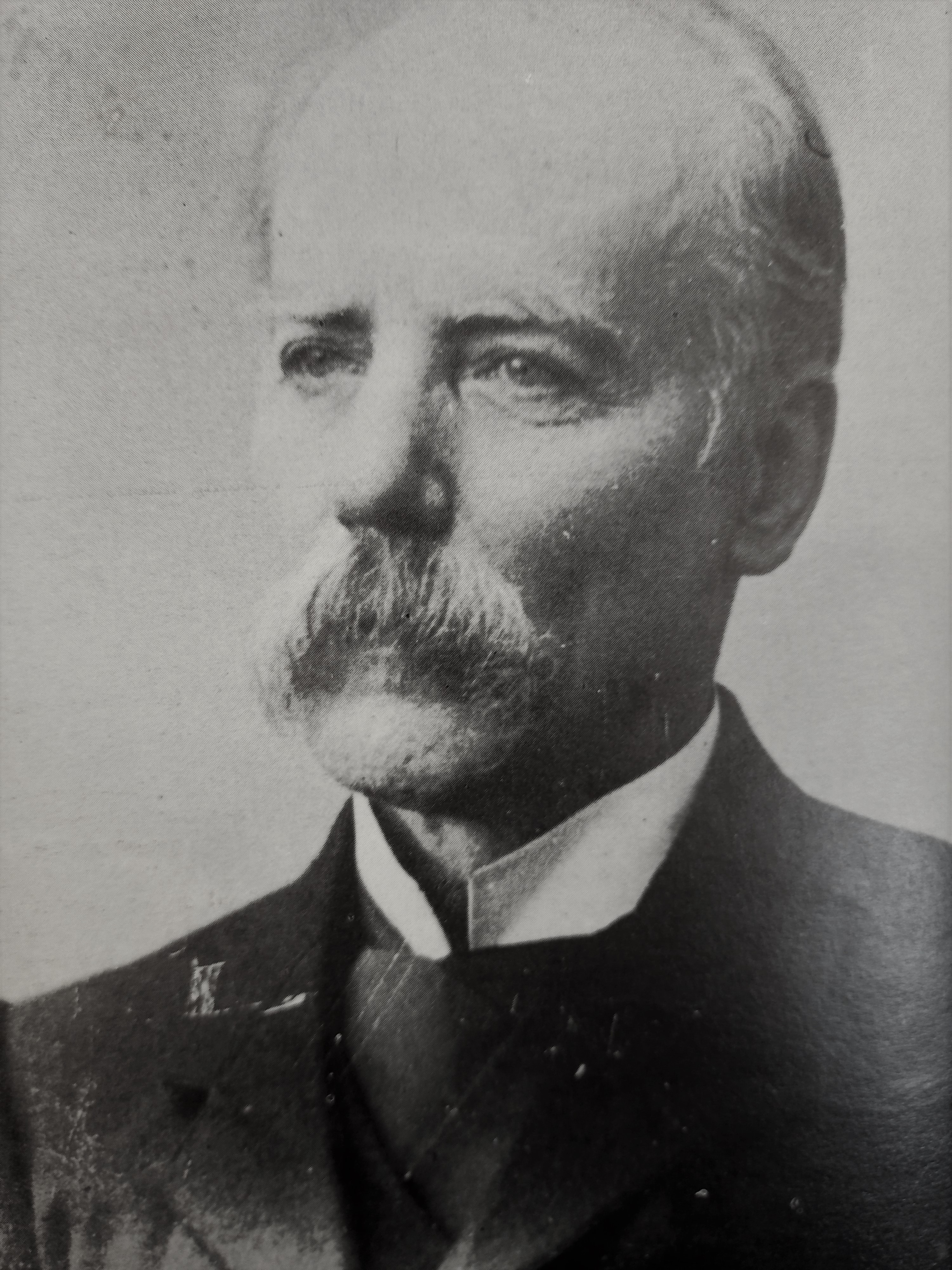
Samuel McCloy

Born in Lisburn, County Antrim, McCloy was the youngest of five children, born to Peter McCloy, a painter, and his wife Martha Phelan. McCloy studied at the School of Design in Belfast from 1850 to 1851 whilst serving an apprenticeship in engraving, with J and T Smyth. He then spent a year at the Central School, Somerset House in London before being appointed Master at the Waterford School of Art around 1853, when he also became a visiting instructor to several other institutions. In the spring of 1865 McCloy married his student, the Waterford artist Ellen Lucy Harris, the fourth daughter of a banker called Richard Harris. The dismembered corpse of McCloy's mother Martha, was recovered from the River Suir in September of the same year. She had been missing since the previous November.

== Career ==
A Fisherman's Children, 1881, pencil and watercolor

Between 1873 and 1891 McCloy showed nine works at the Society of British Artists. Upon his return to Belfast around 1874 he worked freelance designing greetings cards for Marcus Ward & Co., and in creating damask designs for linen manufacturers. He illustrated Sale Barker's Sunny Childhood published by Routledge in 1887, and he was for a time employed by the Illustrated London News.

McCloy showed just once at the Royal Academy of Arts with a work entitled The Haunt of Meditation in 1859. He exhibited infrequently at the Royal Hibernian Academy between 1862 and 1882, where he displayed sixteen works in that time. McCloy displayed eleven works in the 1876 Industrial Exhibition at Belfast's Ulster Hall. In 1880 he showed at Rodman and Company in London where the writer in the Belfast Telegraph indicates that McCloy was becoming a popular artist and was receiving extensive patronage.

Following his relocation to London in 1881, McCloy contributed works to numerous regional exhibitions, including the spring exhibition of the Derby Sketching Club in 1883, Nottingham Castle Museum's autumn exhibition of 1888, and at Exeter's Eland Art Gallery in 1892. He exhibited with the Royal Scottish Academy in 1882 and with the Royal Institute of Painters in Water Colours in 1887. McCloy was also a member of the Belfast Art Society, an antecedent to the Royal Ulster Academy.

== Death and legacy ==
After a year-long illness that prevented him working, McCloy died in Balham, South London, in the autumn of 1904. He was survived by his wife, Ellen and nine daughters. The Lisburn Museum in his hometown, offered a belated retrospective of his work in 1981 to mark the one-hundred and fiftieth anniversary of his birth. The exhibition was the first known solo display of McCloy's work and consisted of 58 works. The catalogue for this show was written by Eileen Black and funded by the Arts Council of Northern Ireland.

McCloy's work can be seen in many public collections including the Ulster Museum, the Victoria and Albert Museum, Amgueddfa Cymru – Museum Wales, the National Gallery of Ireland, and in the Irish Linen Centre and Lisburn Museum.
