= Kyoto Seika University =

Higher education institution in Kyoto Prefecture, Japan

Coordinates: 35°04′23″N 135°46′15″E

Logo

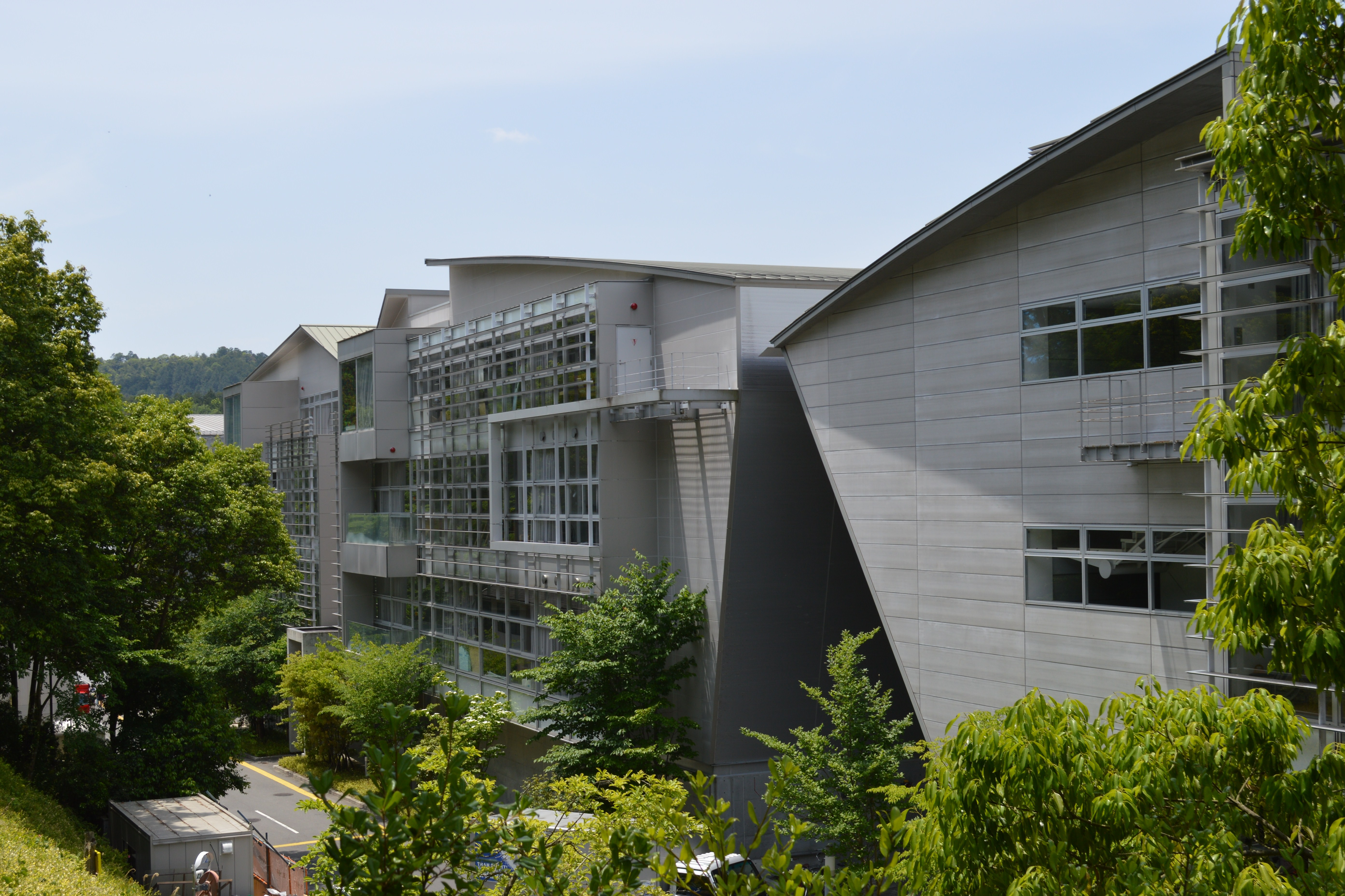
Kyoto Seika University

Kyoto Seika University (京都精華大学, Kyōto Seika Daigaku) is a private university in Iwakura, Kyoto, Japan. The school's predecessor was founded in 1968, and it was chartered as a university in 1979.

The school is noted for its faculties of manga and anime, and being involved in the teaching and training of future manga artists. The dean of the manga faculty is Keiko Takemiya, and noted American anthropologist and translator Rachel Matt Thorn is also an associate professor at the school's faculty of manga. Graduates of the university have forged successful careers in the manga, anime, and media industries. In 2006, Kyoto Seika University and the city of Kyoto established the Kyoto International Manga Museum. Located in a converted elementary school building in downtown Kyoto, it has the world's largest manga collection.

== Notable faculty ==
- Keiko Takemiya (former president, manga)
- Rachel Matt Thorn (manga)
- Gisaburō Sugii (animation)

== Notable alumni ==
- Naoto Ohshima, artist and video game designer
- Chiharu Shiota, installation artist
- Yoji Shinkawa, artist and video game designer
- Falcoon, artist
- Stefana McClure, visual artist
- Albert Yonathan Setyawan, contemporary ceramic artist
- Est Em, manga artist
- Hiro Fujiwara, manga artist
- Muneyuki Kaneshiro, manga artist
- Jun Nishida, ceramicist
- Nio Nakatani, manga artist
- Daisaku Chiba, murdered in 2007

== International collaboration ==
In order provide Indian students direct access to Japanese art style skills in manga and anime development, Kyoto Seika University and IACG Multimedia College established India's first specialized School of Manga and Anime in Hyderabad on 10 September 2025. With assistance from Kyoto Seika University, the goal is to teach Japanese language and cultural values to Indian students. In order to prepare Indian students for the N2 level of the Japanese-Language Proficiency Test and help them graduate from Kyoto Seika University, the School of Manga and Anime will provide an intermediate curriculum for core topics.

The Japan External Trade Organization, the Government of Telangana, the Young India Skills University, and a few production businesses including the Green Gold Animations under the Telangana VFX, Animation and Gaming Association are supporting this effort.
