= Old Town Hall, Lisburn =

Municipal Building in Lisburn, Northern Ireland

Old Town Hall
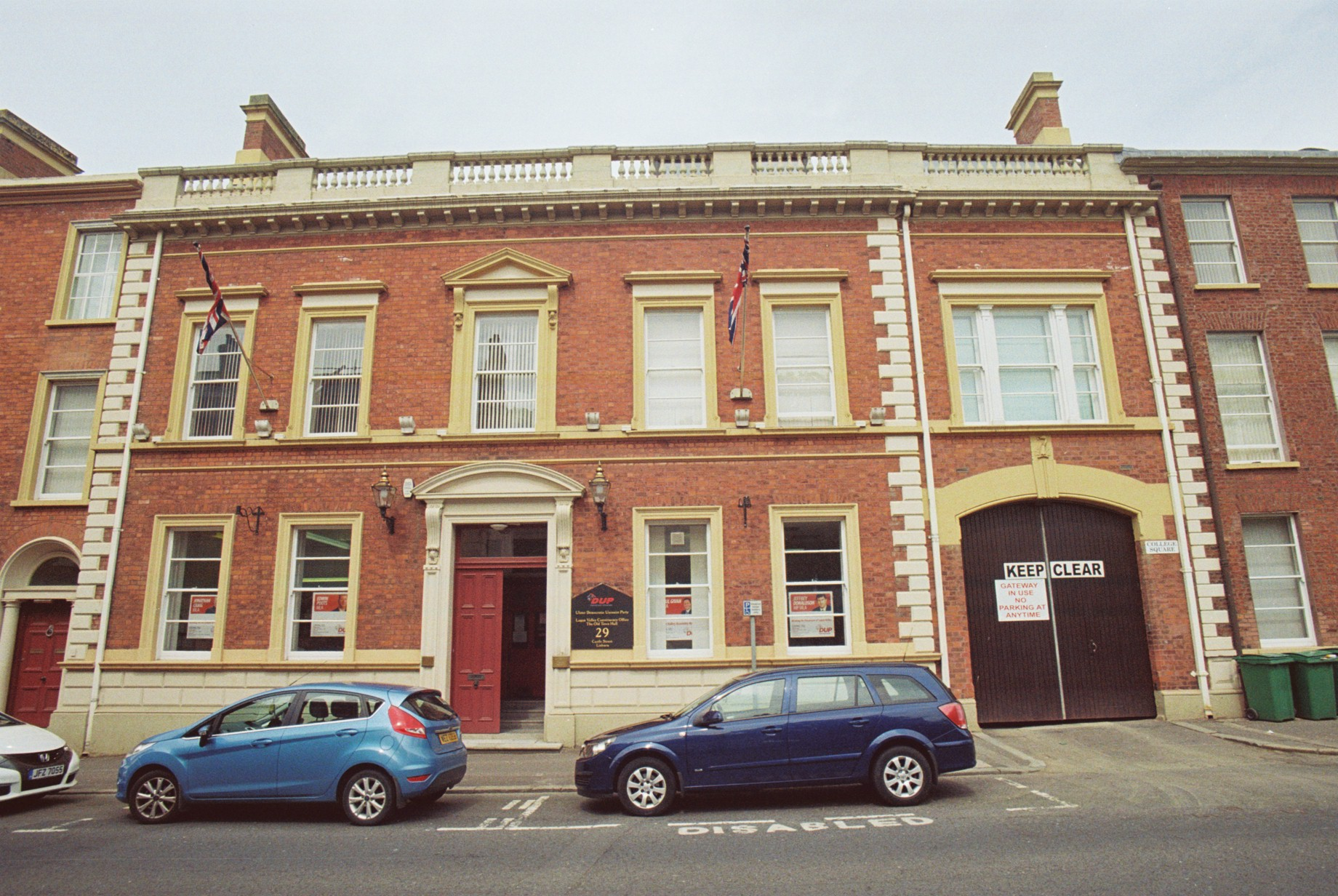
- Old Town Hall

- Shown in Northern Ireland
- 54.5121°N 6.0412°W
- Location: Castle Street, Lisburn

History
- Built: 1884

Site notes
- Architectural style: Neoclassical style

Listed Building – Grade B2
- Official name: D.U.P. Constituency Office, 29 Castle Street, Lisburn, County Antrim
- Designated: 27 May 1994
- Reference no.: HB 19/13/018

The Old Town Hall is a municipal structure in Castle Street, Lisburn, County Antrim, Northern Ireland. The structure, which is used as a constituency office by the Democratic Unionist Party, is a Grade B2 listed building.

== History ==
The building was commissioned by Sir Richard Wallace as an office from which to administer the tenancies of the Hertford Estate. Wallace had inherited the unentailed tenancies from his father, Richard Seymour-Conway, 4th Marquess of Hertford, and had significantly expanded the estate. The rents from the estate were used to finance Wallace's extensive art collection. The site Wallace selected had formerly been occupied by a French Huguenot church which had been completed in the early 18th century.

The building was designed in the neoclassical style, built in red brick with stone finishings and was completed in 1884. The design involved a symmetrical main frontage with five bays facing onto Castle Street. The central bay featured a doorway with a rectangular fanlight, which was flanked by pilasters and brackets supporting a segmental pediment; there was a sash window with an architrave and brackets supporting an entablature and a triangular pediment on the first floor. The other bays were fenestrated by sash windows with architraves on the ground floor, and by sash windows with architraves, entablatures and cornices on the first floor. At roof level, there was a balustraded parapet.

The building was subsequently extended by one bay extended to the east; the extension featured a carriageway arch on the ground floor and a tri-partite window with architrave, entablature, and cornice on the first floor. The local estate manager, Walter Stannus, administered the Hertford estate from this office: speaking tubes were used to communicate between the different offices in the building and Wallace's London agent, Frederick Capron, used a secret staircase to avoid angry tenants. The office became redundant after the tenants exercised their rights to buy under the Irish Lands Acts and the estate was broken up in the late 19th century.

After the area was advanced to the status of an urban district in 1899, the council leaders decided to acquire the building and to establish their own council chamber in it. The building continued to serve as the headquarters of the urban district council for much of the 20th century but ceased to be the local seat of government after the council was advanced to borough status and moved to new offices in The Square in Hillsborough in 1964. The town hall then served as a sub-office for Lisburn Borough Council until 2001. It was converted for use as a constituency office for the Democratic Unionist Party in the early 21st century.
