= Hornsey College of Art =

Former art college in London, England

Coordinates: 51.6436°N 0.1472°W

Hornsey College of Art, also known as HCA, founded in 1880 as the Hornsey School of Arts, was an art school in Crouch End, part of Hornsey, Middlesex, England. From 1965 it was in the London Borough of Haringey. From 1955 to 1973, when it was merged into Middlesex Polytechnic, it was called Hornsey College of Arts and Crafts. Teaching at Crouch End ceased about 1982.

The HCA was "an iconic British art institution, renowned for its experimental and progressive approach to art and design education".

== Background ==
The college was founded in 1880 as the Hornsey School of Arts by Charles Swinstead, an artist and teacher who lived at Crouch End, Hornsey. The college passed to his son, Frank Swinstead, following his death in 1890. During the inter-war years, the school's curriculum was composed of Fine Art, Advertising Design, and Industrial Applied Art. It continued its day-time classes during the Second World War and was one of only two London art schools which did not leave the capital during the blitz.

In 1955 the school became the Hornsey College of Arts and Crafts and continued under that name until 1973, when it was merged with Enfield Technical College and Hendon Technical College as part of Middlesex Polytechnic. The Polytechnic later became Middlesex University.

== The 1968 sit-in ==
During 1968, the college was the scene of protests when students occupied the Crouch End Hill site. Students attending the multi-site college convened to discuss the withdrawal of Student Union funds and resolved to sit-in. During this period they effected a temporary administration of the college, and called for major and consultative review of the art curriculum, supported by sympathetic academic staff and visiting artists. They offered a major critique of the education system at the time. Some of these documents were presented as part of a project called The Hornsey Project. The college was repossessed by local authorities at the beginning of the summer break.

Hornsey achieved notoriety because of the scale of the all-night protests and sit-ins, which were copied in similar art schools around the UK. During the six weeks that the sit-in lasted, Hornsey became the focus of debate about the method of art education and teaching in Britain. Hornsey was, and still is, afforded the blame for these disturbances that swept the student fraternity nationwide.

Kim Howells, his wife Jane, and Nick Wright (then president of the Students' Union on a sabbatical year) initiated the sit-in. Howells was later thrown out of the college and returned to Wales and worked in his local steelworks. He became a trade union official and a minister in Tony Blair's government, including Minister for Higher Education. After the protests, Tom Nairn, then a sociology lecturer, was dismissed from the college.

The Hornsey Affair, a book by students and staff at Hornsey, was published in 1969 by Penguin Books. A documentary film, Our Live Experiment is Worth More Than 3,000 Textbooks, about the Hornsey sit-in was directed by John Goldschmidt for Granada Television and transmitted in 1969.

Patricia Holland's Hornsey Film "reconstructs the arguments and succession of events that led to the occupation of Hornsey College of Art between May and July 1968".

Part of the Hornsey Archive is currently held at Middlesex University in the Sheppard Library as one of their special collections.

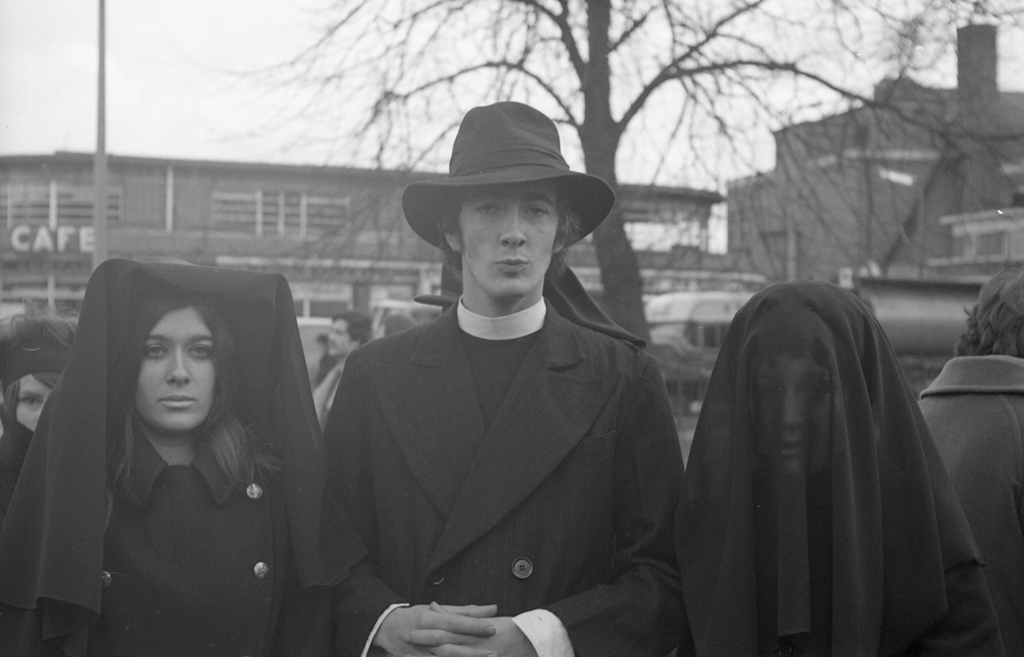
Hornsey Weep In, photo by Nicholas Bechgaard, April 1969

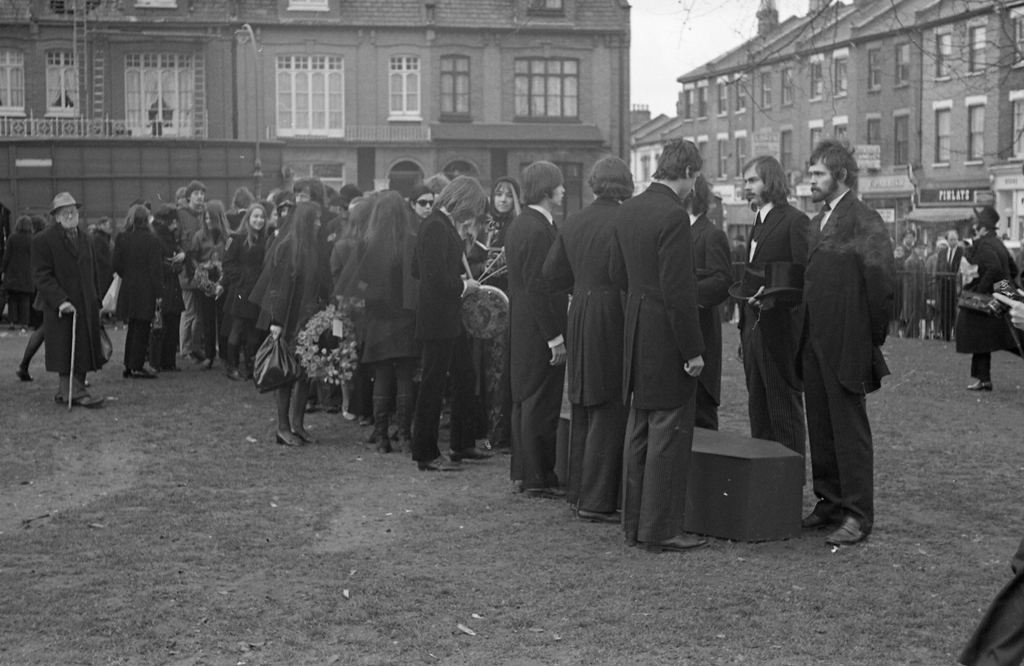
Hornsey Weep In, photo by Nicholas Bechgaard, April 1969

In April 1969 a follow-up mock funeral procession on Duckett's Common, performed by students of the art school, declared "the death of Hornsey Hope".

== Recent use of the building ==
Middlesex University vacated the Crouch End building in the 1980s. The building was then used by the TUC as a training and conference centre. Since 2008, the building has been a part of Coleridge Primary School, upon its expansion to four-form entry.

== Notable alumni and teachers ==
- Viv Albertine (b. 1954), musician
- Pulak Biswas (1941–2013), illustrator
- Stuart Brisley (b. 1933), artist and teacher
- Ted Booth (1938–2026), poet
- Neville Brody (b. 1957), typographer, art director and graphic designer
- Michelle Cartlidge, writer and illustrator
- Michael Casson (1925–2003), potter
- Eileen Chandler (1904–1993), portrait painter
- Colin Chilvers (b. 1945), visual-effects director and film director
- Peter Cook (b. 1936), architect
- Wendy Dagworthy OBE (b. 1950), fashion designer and Royal College of Art professor
- Joseph Darracott (1934–1998), art historian and writer
- Ray Davies (b. 1944), musician (Kinks)
- Lynsey de Paul (1948–2014), singer-songwriter
- Ted Dicks (1928–2012), composer
- Eve Disher (1894–1991), portrait painter
- Les Edwards (b. 1949), illustrator
- Edwin Embleton (1907–2000), graphic designer
- Robert Fuest (1927–2012), film director
- Violet Fuller (1920–2006), artist
- Hannah Gavron (1936–1965), sociologist
- Stuart Goddard (b. 1954) (Adam Ant), musician
- James Herbert (1943–2013), novelist
- Adrian Hill (1895–1977), artist and broadcaster
- Kathleen Horsman (1911–1999), potter
- Ken Howard (b. 1932), artist
- Moira Huntly (b. 1932), artist
- Allen Jones (b. 1937), artist
- Anish Kapoor (b. 1954), artist
- Ken Kiff (1935–2001), artist
- Dorothy King (1907–1990), artist
- Bryan Kneale (b. 1930), artist
- John Kosh (b. 1944), designer and art director, creative director Apple
- Bruce Lacey (1927–2016), performance artist
- Dorothy Larcher (1884–1952), textile designer
- Roger Law (b. 1941), teacher, illustrator and co-creator of television series Spitting Image
- Dante Leonelli (b. 1931), artist
- Graham Lewis (b. 1953), (Wire), musician
- Daphne McClure (b. 1930), artist
- Stefana McClure (b. 1959), artist
- Tom Nairn (b. 1932), academic and writer
- John Napier (b. 1944), theatre designer
- Paul Neagu (1938–2004), sculptor, performance artist
- Denys Ovenden (1922–2019), wildlife artist
- Sam Peffer (1921–2014), commercial artist
- Richard Robbins (1927–2009), artist (including sculptor) and art teacher
- Doc Rowe (b. 1944), folklorist
- Maurice de Sausmarez (1915–1969), artist, writer and art educator
- Hallsteinn Sigurðsson (b. 1945), visual artist (including sculptor)
- Norman Toynton (b. 1939), artist
- Stanley Warren (1917–1992), art teacher, creator of the Changi Murals as a Japanese prisoner of war
- Eric Watson (1955–2012), photographer
- Richard Wentworth (b. 1947), artist
- Richard Wilson (b. 1953), sculptor
- Theresa Wiseman (b. 1956), footballer and animator
- The Raincoats, rock band, members Gina Birch and Ana da Silva
