= Ted Booth =

English marathon runner and poet (1938–2026)

- Born: 1938; Belvedere, Kent, England
- Died: 20 February 2026 (aged 87)
- Education: London School of Economics
- Occupations: Marathon runner, poet

Ted Booth (1938 – 20 February 2026) was an English marathon runner and poet. He was a lecturer of creative writing at the Hornsey College of Art from 1972 to 1998, and was a seventeen-time competitor at the London Marathon.

He was born in 1938, the son of Jack, a metallurgist and Mary Booth, a librarian. He died after a short illness at his home on 20 February 2026, at the age of 87.
