= Ikenobo College =

Private junior college in Kyoto, Japan

Coordinates: 35°0′11.7″N 135°45′27.5″E

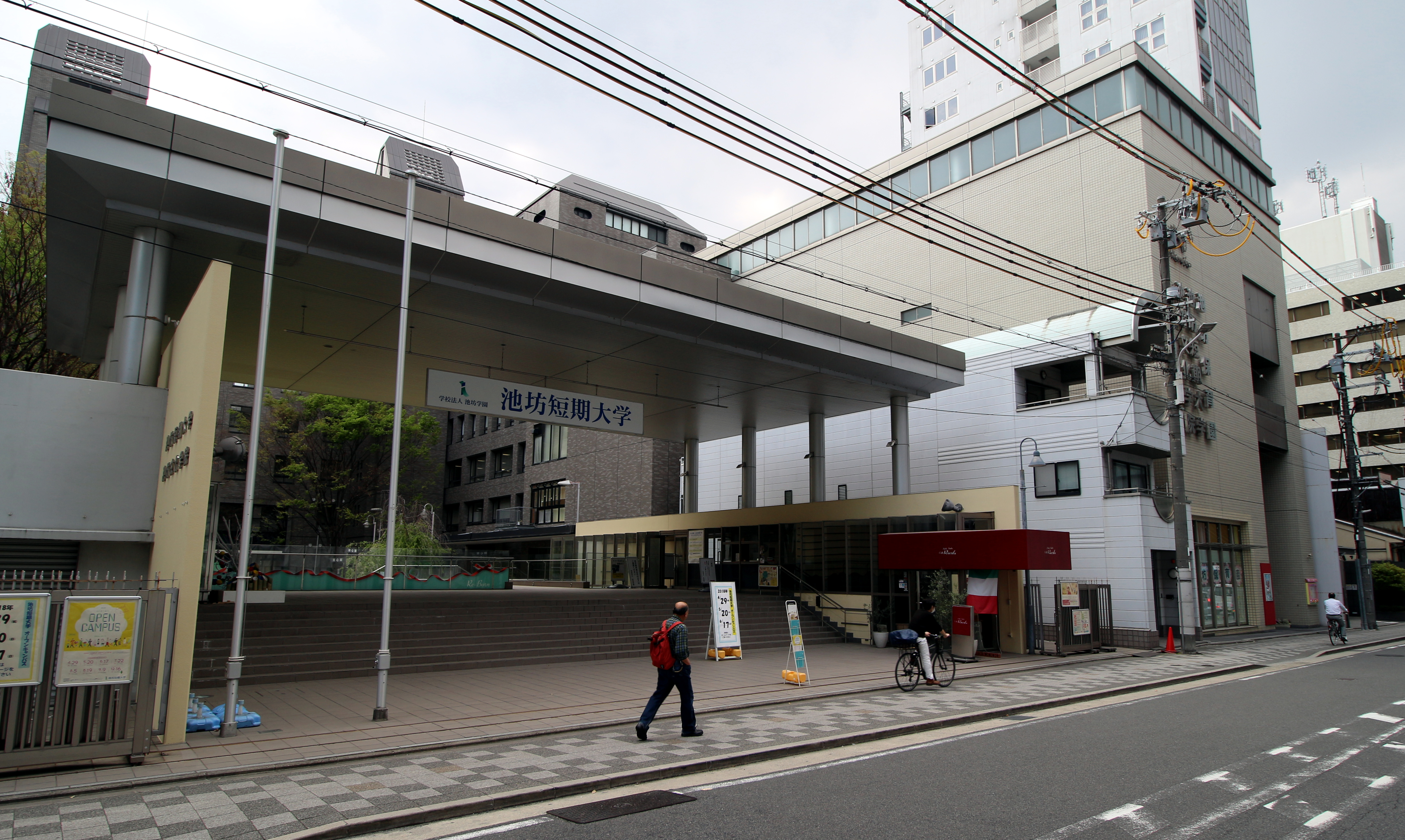
Ikenobo College, Kyoto

Ikenobo Junior College (池坊短期大学, Ikenobō tanki daigaku) is a private junior college in Kyoto, Japan, established in 1952.

== Alumni ==
- Manami Honjo, actress
