= St Patrick's GAA (Down) =

Gaelic sports club in County Antrim, Northern Ireland

St Patrick's
- Founded: 1965
- County: Antrim
- Colours: Yellow/Blue
- Grounds: Kirkwood Road, Lisburn
- Coordinates: 54°31′41.02″N 6°02′57.96″W

Playing kits
Standard colours

St Patrick's GAC is a Gaelic Athletic Association in County Antrim, Northern Ireland. The club was founded in 1965 and the current playing field is situated in Lisburn. The GAA club currently plays Gaelic football only and has the ranks from juvenile up to senior. The club participates in competitions organized by Antrim county board.

== History ==
Founded in 1965 (unofficially in 1950) the GAA club started out doing only Gaelic Football but briefly did hurling in 2007. Hurling didn't last due to coach numbers.

== Crest ==
The St Patrick's crest consists of a flame, a castle, and the red hand of Ulster.
