= Eve Disher =

British artist (1894-1991)

- Born: 1894; London, England
- Died: 1991 (aged 96–97)
- Known for: Portrait painting
- Spouse: Maurice Willson Disher

Eve Disher (1894–1991) was a British artist known for her portrait paintings but who also painted urban scenes and flower paintings.

== Biography ==
Disher was born in London and studied at the Hornsey School of Art. During World War One, Disher worked for the London Fire Brigade. In her early twenties she married the theatre critic and author Maurice Willson Disher and thru him became friendly with members of the Bloomsbury Group, in particular Duncan Grant. During this time Disher shared a studio with the artist Vera Cuningham, who was a great influence on her artistic style. Disher travelled widely and spent periods living in both South Africa and Jamaica. In Britain she exhibited with the Society of Women Artists, the Women's International Art Club and at the Mattheisen Gallery. Foyles Art Gallery hosted a solo exhibition of her work in 1987. Known for her portraits, often in gouache, the National Portrait Gallery in London holds Disher's 1936 portrait of J. B. S. Haldane.
