= St Columbanus' College =

Coordinates: 54.661°N 5.634°W

Location
- Ballymaconnell Road; Bangor, County Down, BT20 5PU; Northern Ireland

Information
- Type: All-ability school
- Motto: Lex dei in corde meo The law of God in my heart
- Religious affiliation: Roman Catholic
- Established: 1959 First intake 1960
- Founder: Bishop Daniel Mageean
- Local authority: Education Authority South East
- Chair: Pat McCartan
- Head teacher: Maria Flynn
- Staff: 91
- Gender: Co-educational
- Age: 11 to 18
- Enrolment: 770 As of May 2021
- Colour
- Website: http://www.stcolumbanus.org.uk

St. Columbanus' College is a Roman Catholic secondary school situated on the Ballymaconnell Road, Bangor, County Down, Northern Ireland.

== History ==
The foundation stone for St Columbanus' Secondary Intermediate School, as it was then known, was laid by Bishop Daniel Mageean on the Feast of the Assumption, 15 August 1959. The school was built to serve the parishes of Bangor, Holywood and Newtownards and opened within a week of the feast of St Columbanus on 29 November 1960.

A wide curriculum was offered with an emphasis on the teaching of vocational and technical skills. Many pupils left at the age of fifteen to take up employment while a small GCE class remained to study for external examinations. The late 1960s and early 1970s saw a significant growth in enrolment which required a major extension to the original building. The school has grown significantly, focusing on both academic and vocational skills.

In 2001, the college established a Sixth Form, allowing post-GCSE pupils to remain and study at St. Columbanus. Numbers of students completing A Levels at the college are still on the rise, showing an approximate 4-fold increase in the past 3 years.

== Subjects ==
The school offers a range of subjects including; Art & Design, Home Economics, English, Drama, French, Spanish, Geography, History, Mathematics, Science, Technology & Design, Music, Religion, Learning for life and work, ICT and P.E. Such subjects are compulsory to study at Key Stage 3 level.

At Key Stage 4, the college offers further study in the above subjects, as well as:

- Moving Image Arts
- Business Studies
- Construction
- Single Award Science
- Double Award Science
- Biology
- English Literature
- Home Economics -Child ec
- Home Economics -Food
- Music

The school has partnered with the South Eastern Regional College in Bangor to give students the opportunity to study further vocational and practical subjects at the equivalent of GCSE level.

At A Level, Sixth Form students have the opportunity to study on site:

- Art
- Moving Image Arts
- Applied Information and Communication Technology
- Business Studies
- Public Service
- Health and Social Care
- Applied Single Award Science
- Biology
- Sociology
- Geography
- Mathematics
- Religious Studies
- English Literature

Sixth Form students also have the opportunity to study other A Levels at neighbouring schools through the North Down and Ards Learning Community. Schools who have taken part in this partnership are: Glenlola Collegiate, Bangor Grammar School, Glastry College, Priory College and Bangor Academy. The additional A Level subjects offered to St. Columbanus students by include, Chemistry, Drama, Psychology, Music Technology.

== Facilities ==
St. Columbanus houses multiple, well-equipped ICT suites, a sports hall and assembly hall, a sports and athletic pitch, technology and design suites and science suites. The school's entrances are also fully accessible.
