= List of clock towers in the United Kingdom =

This is a list of clock towers in the United Kingdom.

== England ==
Name	City/Town	County	Built	Image	Notes
Albert	Barnstaple	Devon	1862		Designed by R. D. Gould; Opened on the first anniversary of Prince Albert's death.
Abberley Clock Tower	Abberley	Worcestershire	1883/84		
Bildeston Clock Tower	Bildeston	Suffolk	1864		
Blaker's Park Clock Tower					
Chrisp Street Market Clock Tower	Poplar	London			
Coleford Clock Tower	Coleford	Gloucestershire	1821		
Croydon Clocktower	Croydon				
Downham Market Clock Tower	Downham Market	Norfolk	1878		
Goole Clock Tower	Goole	East Riding of Yorkshire	1926		
Joseph Chamberlain Memorial Clock Tower (Old Joe)	Edgbaston	Birmingham	1909		
Jubilee Clock Tower	Brighton	East Sussex	1888		
Jubilee Clock Tower, Maidenhead	Maidenhead	Lancashire	1899-1900		
Jubilee Clock Tower, Seaton	Seaton	Devon	1887		
Jubilee Clock Tower, Skegness	Skegness	Lincolnshire	1898-99		
King Edward VII Memorial Clock Tower	Bexhill-on-Sea	East Sussex	1904		
Miles Memorial Clock Tower	Exeter	Devon	1897		
Morecambe Clock Tower	Morecambe	Berkshire	1905		
Watton Clock Tower	Watton	Norfolk	1679		

== Northern Ireland ==
Name	City/Town	County	Built	Image	Notes
McKee Clock	Bangor	County Down	1915		
Albert Memorial Clock	Belfast	County Antrim	1865-69		
Crumlin Clock Tower	Crumlin	County Antrim	1897		
Bushmills Clock Tower	Bushmills	County Antrim	1874		

== Scotland ==
Name	City/Town	County	Built	Image	Notes
Tobermory Clock Tower	Tobermory	Isle of Mull	1905		
Dufftown Clock Tower	Dufftown	Moray	1836-39		
Gatehouse of Fleet Clock Tower	Gatehouse of Fleet	Dumfries and Galloway	1871		

== Wales ==
Name	City/Town	County	Built	Image	Notes
Knighton Clock Tower	Knighton	Powys	1872		
Machynlleth Clock Tower	Machynlleth	Powys	1874		
Hay-on-Wye Clock Tower	Hay-on-Wye	Powys	1881		
Rhayader Clock Tower	Rhayader	Powys	1924		
Rhyl Clock Tower	Rhyl	Denbighshire	1948		
Marloes Clock Tower	Marloes	Pembrokeshire	1904		
Bangor Clock Tower	Bangor	Gwynedd	1886-7		
Usk Clock Tower	Usk	Monmouthshire	1887		
Rayner Memorial Clock Tower	Llangefni	Anglesey	1902		
Peers Memorial Clock Tower	Ruthin	Denbighshire	1883		
Aberystwyth Clock Tower	Aberystwyth	Ceredigion	2000		
Carmarthen Market Clock Tower	Carmarthen	Carmarthenshire	1846		

== Bibliography ==
- Newman, Kevin (2023). Clock Towers of England. Amberley Publishing Limited. ISBN 978-1-3981-0238-5.
