= Tonic Cinema =

Coordinates: 54.661°N 5.661°W

The Tonic Cinema was built in 1936 in Bangor, Northern Ireland. At the time it was the largest Cinema in Ireland with 2,500 seats. It was demolished in 1992 following a fire. The old Compton Theatre Organ, formerly in the Tonic Cinema, was in the care of Bangor Academy School but following the demolition of the school, the organ was moved to north east England where it is in the care of an enthusiast in Hull.

It was one of only two Theatre Organs still in Northern Ireland, the other being in the Movieland Cinema, Newtownards, County Down, where it was installed in 1994, having originally been in the Ambassador Cinema, Hounslow, west London.

One notable event to be held there was a concert by Dionne Warwick on Thursday 20 January 1983. She sang songs from her extensive back catalogue and her 1982 hit album Heartbreaker.
