= Listed buildings in Bildeston =

Civil Parish in Suffolk, England

Bildeston is a village and civil parish in the Babergh District of Suffolk, England. It contains 73 listed buildings that are recorded in the National Heritage List for England. Of these one is grade I, five are grade II* and 67 are grade II.

This list is based on the information retrieved online from Historic England.

== Key ==
Grade	Criteria
I	Buildings that are of exceptional interest
II*	Particularly important buildings of more than special interest
II	Buildings that are of special interest

== Listing ==
Name	Grade	Location	Type	Completed (Note: The date given is the date used by Historic England as significant for the initial building or that of an important part in the structure's description.)	Date designated	Grid ref. (Note: The grid reference is based on the British national grid reference system, sometimes known as OSGB36, used by the Ordnance Survey.) Geo-coordinates	Notes	Entry number (Note: The "List Entry Number" is a unique number assigned to each listed building and scheduled monument by Historic England.)	Image	Wikidata
1 Chapel Street and 101 High Street	II	1, Chapel Street			10 July 1980	TL9927949446; 52°06′27″N 0°54′31″E		1193516	1 Chapel Street and 101 High Street More images	Q26488174
2, Chapel Street	II	2, Chapel Street			10 July 1980	TL9919049438; 52°06′27″N 0°54′26″E		1037444	Upload Photo	Q26289163
3 Chapel Street	II	3, Chapel Street			10 July 1980	TL9926849441; 52°06′27″N 0°54′30″E		1037446	3 Chapel Street More images	Q26289165
5 and 7 Chapel Street	II	5 and 7, Chapel Street			10 July 1980	TL9925749435; 52°06′26″N 0°54′30″E		1351382	5 and 7 Chapel Street More images	Q26634492
The Nook	II	9, Chapel Street			23 January 1958	TL9925149433; 52°06′26″N 0°54′29″E		1037447	The Nook More images	Q26289166
Carlisle House	II	11 and 13, Chapel Street			23 January 1958	TL9924449431; 52°06′26″N 0°54′29″E		1193235	Upload Photo	Q26487890
15 (bec Cottage) and 17 Chapel Street	II*	17, Chapel Street	cottage		23 January 1958	TL9922249424; 52°06′26″N 0°54′28″E		1351383	15 (bec Cottage) and 17 Chapel Street More images	Q17534335
22, Chapel Street	II	22, Chapel Street			10 July 1980	TL9912349415; 52°06′26″N 0°54′23″E		1037445	22, Chapel Street More images	Q26289164
23-33, Chapel Street	II*	23-33, Chapel Street	building		23 January 1958	TL9918549406; 52°06′26″N 0°54′26″E		1193239	23-33, Chapel Street More images	Q17533775
Spinners Cottage and Weavers Cottage	II*	35, Chapel Street	cottage		23 January 1958	TL9917549402; 52°06′25″N 0°54′25″E		1037448	Spinners Cottage and Weavers Cottage More images	Q17533534
Sheridan	II	39, Chapel Street			23 January 1958	TL9916449398; 52°06′25″N 0°54′25″E		1193247	Upload Photo	Q26487902
Number 47 and 49-53 (hurrell Place)	II	47, Chapel Street			10 July 1980	TL9914549395; 52°06′25″N 0°54′24″E		1351384	Upload Photo	Q26634493
Church of St Mary Magdalene	I	Church Lane	church building		23 January 1958	TL9856749208; 52°06′20″N 0°53′53″E		1037449	Church of St Mary Magdalene More images	Q17542031
1, 3 and 5 Duke Street	II	1, 3 and 5, Duke Street			23 January 1958	TL9921349484; 52°06′28″N 0°54′27″E		1193256	1, 3 and 5 Duke Street More images	Q26487912
7, 9 and 11 Duke Street	II	11, Duke Street			23 January 1958	TL9919849476; 52°06′28″N 0°54′27″E		1037450	7, 9 and 11 Duke Street More images	Q26289167
15 and 17 Duke Street	II	15 and 17, Duke Street			10 July 1980	TL9917449464; 52°06′27″N 0°54′25″E		1351385	15 and 17 Duke Street More images	Q26634494
19-23 Duke Street	II	19-23, Duke Street			10 July 1980	TL9916049455; 52°06′27″N 0°54′25″E		1193273	19-23 Duke Street More images	Q26487927
25 and 27 (woolcombers), 31 and 33 Duke Street	II	25, Duke Street			10 July 1980	TL9914549446; 52°06′27″N 0°54′24″E		1037451	25 and 27 (woolcombers), 31 and 33 Duke Street More images	Q26289168
Bildeston Hall	II	35, Duke Street			10 July 1980	TL9910449430; 52°06′26″N 0°54′22″E		1193280	Bildeston Hall More images	Q26487935
Cottage at Rear of Number 13 (dukes Hall)	II	Duke Street			10 July 1980	TL9917449482; 52°06′28″N 0°54′25″E		1286237	Upload Photo	Q26574855
2 and 4, High Street	II	2 and 4, High Street			10 July 1980	TL9938348930; 52°06′10″N 0°54′35″E		1351386	2 and 4, High Street More images	Q26634495
3 and 5, High Street	II	3 and 5, High Street			10 July 1980	TL9937148966; 52°06′11″N 0°54′35″E		1037421	3 and 5, High Street More images	Q26289139
7, High Street	II	7, High Street			10 July 1980	TL9937148979; 52°06′12″N 0°54′35″E		1286141	7, High Street More images	Q26574774
The Laurels	II	18, High Street			10 July 1980	TL9940649037; 52°06′13″N 0°54′37″E		1193289	The Laurels More images	Q26487942
Newbury Farmhouse	II*	22, High Street			23 January 1958	TL9939949075; 52°06′15″N 0°54′36″E		1037409	Newbury Farmhouse More images	Q17533511
Tudor Cottage	II	44, High Street			10 July 1980	TL9935249204; 52°06′19″N 0°54′34″E		1351404	Tudor Cottage More images	Q26634513
48 and 50, High Street	II	48 and 50, High Street			10 July 1980	TL9934849220; 52°06′19″N 0°54′34″E		1037410	48 and 50, High Street More images	Q26289127
66, High Street	II	66, High Street			10 July 1980	TL9932949276; 52°06′21″N 0°54′33″E		1351405	66, High Street More images	Q26634514
Endways	II	67 and 69, High Street			10 July 1980	TL9931449277; 52°06′21″N 0°54′32″E		1286143	Upload Photo	Q26574776
71, High Street	II	71, High Street			10 July 1980	TL9931549288; 52°06′22″N 0°54′32″E		1351409	71, High Street More images	Q26634518
73 and 75 High Street	II	73 and 75, High Street			10 July 1980	TL9931349307; 52°06′22″N 0°54′32″E		1193496	73 and 75 High Street More images	Q26488155
Minto House	II	76, High Street			10 July 1980	TL9933049305; 52°06′22″N 0°54′33″E		1037411	Minto House More images	Q26289128
Rose House	II	77, High Street, IP7 7ER			10 July 1980	TL9931149328; 52°06′23″N 0°54′32″E		1037423	Rose House More images	Q26289142
78 and 80 High Street	II	78 and 80, High Street			10 July 1980	TL9932849322; 52°06′23″N 0°54′33″E		1037412	78 and 80 High Street More images	Q26289129
79 High Street	II	79, High Street			10 July 1980	TL9931049339; 52°06′23″N 0°54′32″E		1193501	79 High Street More images	Q26488159
82 and 84 High Street	II	82 and 84, High Street			10 July 1980	TL9932849344; 52°06′23″N 0°54′33″E		1351406	82 and 84 High Street More images	Q26634515
83 High Street	II	83, High Street			10 July 1980	TL9930049355; 52°06′24″N 0°54′32″E		1037424	83 High Street More images	Q26289143
Nos 86, 88, and 90 (post Office), High Street	II	86 and 88, High Street	post office		23 January 1958	TL9932349373; 52°06′24″N 0°54′33″E		1037413	Nos 86, 88, and 90 (post Office), High Street More images	Q26289131
87 and 89 (part) High Street	II	87, High Street			10 July 1980	TL9931049370; 52°06′24″N 0°54′32″E		1351410	87 and 89 (part) High Street More images	Q26634519
89 (part) and 93 High Street	II	89, High Street			10 July 1980	TL9930849377; 52°06′24″N 0°54′32″E		1286150	89 (part) and 93 High Street More images	Q26574781
Forge House	II	95, High Street			10 July 1980	TL9930549392; 52°06′25″N 0°54′32″E		1037425	Forge House	Q26289144
96 and 98 High Street	II	96 and 98, High Street			10 July 1980	TL9932549393; 52°06′25″N 0°54′33″E		1351407	96 and 98 High Street More images	Q26634516
Co-operative Shop	II	100, High Street			10 July 1980	TL9932349401; 52°06′25″N 0°54′33″E		1037414	Co-operative Shop More images	Q26289132
The Crown Inn	II*	104, High Street	inn		23 January 1958	TL9931149424; 52°06′26″N 0°54′33″E		1286228	The Crown Inn More images	Q17534289
106 High Street	II	106, High Street			10 July 1980	TL9930349435; 52°06′26″N 0°54′32″E		1351408	106 High Street More images	Q26634517
112 and 114 High Street	II	112 and 114, High Street			10 July 1980	TL9929249456; 52°06′27″N 0°54′32″E		1193341	112 and 114 High Street More images	Q26487993
Bow Window Restaurant and Wine Bar	II	116, High Street			23 January 1958	TL9928249469; 52°06′27″N 0°54′31″E		1037415	Bow Window Restaurant and Wine Bar More images	Q26289133
118, 120 and 122, High Street	II	118, 120 and 122, High Street			23 January 1958	TL9927649475; 52°06′28″N 0°54′31″E		1193408	118, 120 and 122, High Street More images	Q26488075
Red House	II	126, High Street	house		23 January 1958	TL9926349496; 52°06′28″N 0°54′30″E		1037416	Red House More images	Q26289134
Church View	II	127, High Street			23 January 1958	TL9919849560; 52°06′31″N 0°54′27″E		1351411	Church View More images	Q26634520
129 and 131, High Street	II	129 and 131, High Street			10 July 1980	TL9919249570; 52°06′31″N 0°54′27″E		1286117	Upload Photo	Q26574753
The King's Head Inn	II	130, High Street	inn		23 January 1958	TL9925249513; 52°06′29″N 0°54′30″E		1193417	The King's Head Inn More images	Q26488082
The King's Head Inn and Barclays Bank	II	132, High Street	building		23 January 1958	TL9924749522; 52°06′29″N 0°54′29″E		1037417	The King's Head Inn and Barclays Bank More images	Q26289135
Hope Cottage	II	133 and 135, High Street			10 July 1980	TL9918249581; 52°06′31″N 0°54′26″E		1037426	Hope Cottage More images	Q26289145
134, 134a and 136, High Street	II	134, 134a and 136, High Street			23 January 1958	TL9923649534; 52°06′30″N 0°54′29″E		1286189	134, 134a and 136, High Street More images	Q26574812
138 and 140 High Street	II	138 and 140, High Street			23 January 1958	TL9922449548; 52°06′30″N 0°54′28″E		1037418	138 and 140 High Street More images	Q26289136
141 and 141a, High Street	II	141 and 141a, High Street			10 July 1980	TL9916849612; 52°06′32″N 0°54′25″E		1193532	141 and 141a, High Street More images	Q26488188
147, High Street	II	147, High Street			10 July 1980	TL9913949643; 52°06′33″N 0°54′24″E		1351412	147, High Street More images	Q26634521
Verandah Cottage	II	150 and 152, High Street			10 July 1980	TL9920749585; 52°06′31″N 0°54′27″E		1037419	Verandah Cottage More images	Q26289137
Number 158 (wing House) and Number 160 (the Cottage)	II	160, High Street			10 July 1980	TL9918549609; 52°06′32″N 0°54′26″E		1286136	Number 158 (wing House) and Number 160 (the Cottage) More images	Q26574769
162, High Street	II	162, High Street			10 July 1980	TL9917549625; 52°06′33″N 0°54′26″E		1037420	Upload Photo	Q26289138
Number 166 (bay Lodge) and Number 168 ( Jasmine Cottage)	II	166, High Street			10 July 1980	TL9916549639; 52°06′33″N 0°54′25″E		1286138	Number 166 (bay Lodge) and Number 168 ( Jasmine Cottage) More images	Q26574771
Red Lion Public House	II	High Street			10 July 1980	TL9931749244; 52°06′20″N 0°54′32″E		1037422	Red Lion Public House More images	Q26289141
Great Copt Hall	II	Ipswich Road			10 July 1980	TM0001349365; 52°06′23″N 0°55′09″E		1193537	Upload Photo	Q26488193
1, Market Place	II	1, Market Place			10 July 1980	TL9924449457; 52°06′27″N 0°54′29″E		1037427	1, Market Place More images	Q26289146
3, Market Place	II	3, Market Place			10 July 1980	TL9923649466; 52°06′27″N 0°54′29″E		1037428	3, Market Place More images	Q26289147
5 and 7, Market Place	II	5 and 7, Market Place			10 July 1980	TL9922949471; 52°06′28″N 0°54′28″E		1193543	5 and 7, Market Place More images	Q26488200
Clock Tower	II	Market Place	clock tower		14 May 2010	TL9925349475; 52°06′28″N 0°54′30″E		1393792	Clock Tower More images	Q26672935
K6 Telephone Kiosk by Clock Tower	II	Market Place			21 September 1987	TL9925549476; 52°06′28″N 0°54′30″E		1037016	K6 Telephone Kiosk by Clock Tower	Q26288699
The Rectory	II	Market Place			10 July 1980	TL9922749509; 52°06′29″N 0°54′28″E		1351413	The Rectory More images	Q26634522
Stable Block to North of the Rectory	II	Market Place, nördlich des Pfarrhauses			10 July 1980	TL9921249534; 52°06′30″N 0°54′28″E		1193549	Upload Photo	Q26488206
War Memorial	II	Market Place	war memorial		11 November 2009	TL9925949466; 52°06′27″N 0°54′30″E		1393522	War Memorial More images	Q26672679
Mallary Cottage	II	Wattisham Road			10 July 1980	TL9925949599; 52°06′32″N 0°54′30″E		1037429	Mallary Cottage More images	Q26289148

== See also ==
- Grade I listed buildings in Suffolk
- Grade II* listed buildings in Suffolk

== Sources ==
- Bettely, James; Pevsner, Nikolaus (2015) [1961], Suffolk: West, The Buildings of England, New Haven and London: Yale University Press, ISBN 978-0-300-19655-9
