= Kilcooly =

Kilcooly or Kilcooley can refer to

- Kilcooly Abbey, County Tipperary
- Kilcooly (civil parish), County Tipperary
- Kilcooley estate, housing estate, County Down
