= Priory Integrated College =

Location
- My Lady's Mile; Holywood, County Down, BT18 9ER; Northern Ireland; 54.636595°N 5.834735°W

Information
- Former name: Holywood High School
- Type: Integrated secondary school
- Motto: Collaborans (Together)
- Religious affiliation: Integrated
- Established: 1997 (as Priory Integrated College); 1952 (as Holywood High School)
- School district: Ards and North Down
- Local authority: SEELB
- Specialist: Humanities
- Principal: Nicola Wilson
- Staff: Approx 70
- Years: 8–14
- Gender: Co-educational
- Age range: 11-18
- Enrolment: Approx 650
- Classes offered: Key Stage 3, GCSE, A-Level
- Language: English
- Hours in school day: 6-7
- Colours: Navy, Green and white
- Website: priorycollege.co.uk

Priory Integrated College or more commonly known as Priory College or simply Priory is a secondary school located on My Lady's Mile, in Holywood, County Down, Northern Ireland.

It is a co-educational integrated college taking in 11- to 18-year-old pupils from a wide area beyond Holywood, including Millisle, Donaghadee, Bangor, Newtownards, Dundonald and Belfast.

Priory is an Apple distinguished school, and every student is assigned with an educational iPad used for school work, homework, coursework and revision. The school received an iTeach technology award in 2016.

The school offers a range of subjects including; Art and Design, Home Economics, English Language, English Literature, French, Geography, History, Mathematics, Science, Technology and Design, Music, Learning for Life and Work, ICT and P.E. These subjects are compulsory to study at Key Stage 3 Level. At GCSE level the school offers further studies and its main education board of choice is CCEA, but also uses AQA, OCR and Edexcel in certain subjects.

== History ==
The school was originally named as Holywood High School in its foundation year in 1952. In 1997, the name of the school was changed to Priory Integrated College in order to appeal to all religions and to focus on integrated education after a consultation with parents also came to an agreement. The process of transformation began with funding provided by the Integrated Education Fund.

== Sixth Form ==
Priory Integrated College enrols pupils from many schools and of varying abilities in its sixth form centre to carry out their AS and A levels. Pupils are able to study A levels and BTECs. The majority of students subsequently go on to degree courses at higher education institutions, including South Eastern Regional College, or universities within the UK for careers with further training.

== Sports ==
- Aerobics
- Badminton
- Basketball
- Cricket
- Dodgeball
- Football
- Gymnastics
- Hockey
- Netball
- Rounders
- Rugby union
- Tennis
- Track and field
- Volleyball

== Extracurricular activities ==
- Art club
- Band
- Breakfast club
- Choir
- IT club
- Library
- Music lessons
- Student council
- Trivia
- Voluntary work

== See also ==
- List of integrated schools in Northern Ireland
- List of secondary schools in Northern Ireland

== Notable pupils ==
- Matty Burrows- A professional footballer from Northern Ireland who plays for Ards F.C. in the IFA Premiership, and was on the shortlist for the 2010 FIFA Puskas Award.

Stephen Monroe aka Stephen Monroe on the radio
