= Clock Tower, Bildeston =

Clock Tower
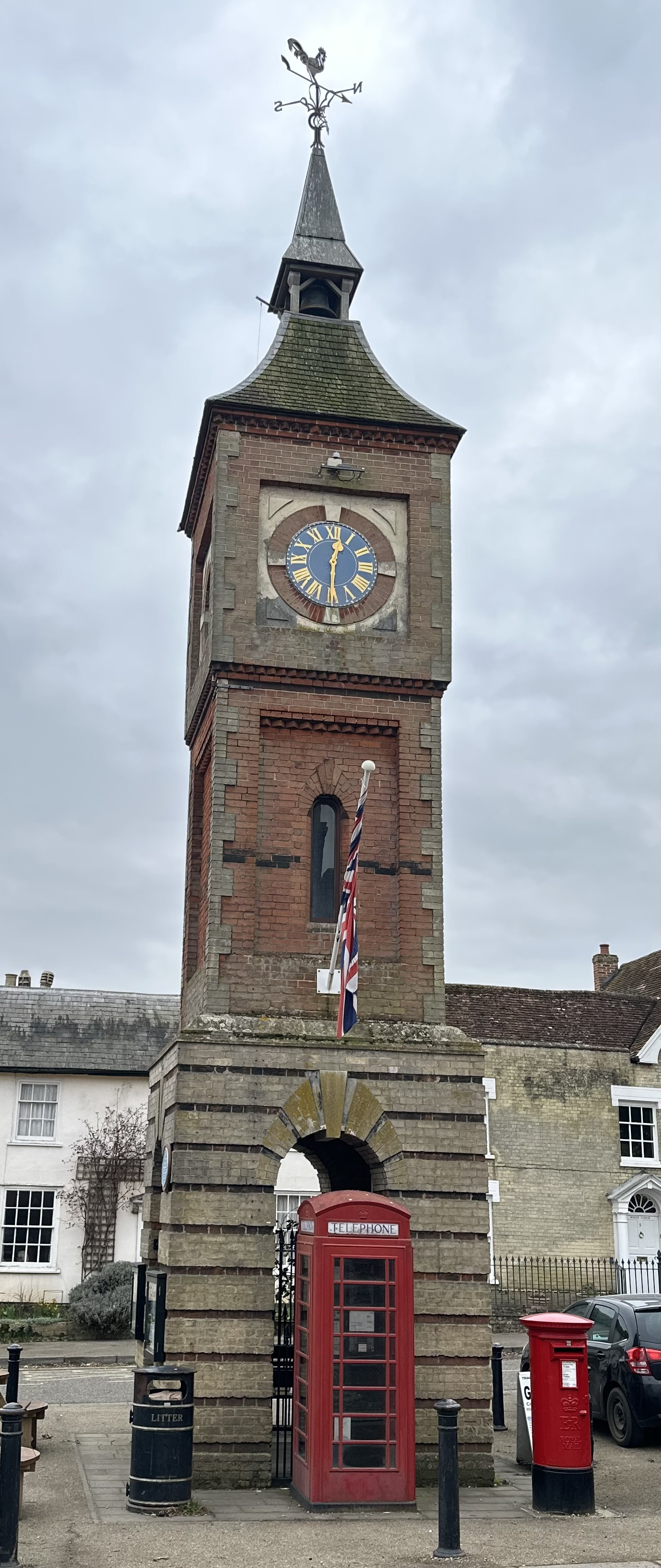
- Interactive map of the Clock Tower area

General information
- Type: Clock tower
- Location: Bildeston, Suffolk, UK
- Coordinates: 52°06′28″N 0°54′30″E
- Completed: 1864

The Clock Tower is a clock tower in the market place, in the centre of Bildeston, Suffolk, England. It was erected in 1864. In 2010 it became Grade II listed.

== History ==
Bildeston's clock tower was erected in the centre of its market place in 1864. The cost of its construction was part provided by the local community.

The tower became grade II listed in 2010.

== Architecture ==
The tower's base is arched. At the top is a spire on an open ball-turret. Bricks are red and white.

== Gallery ==
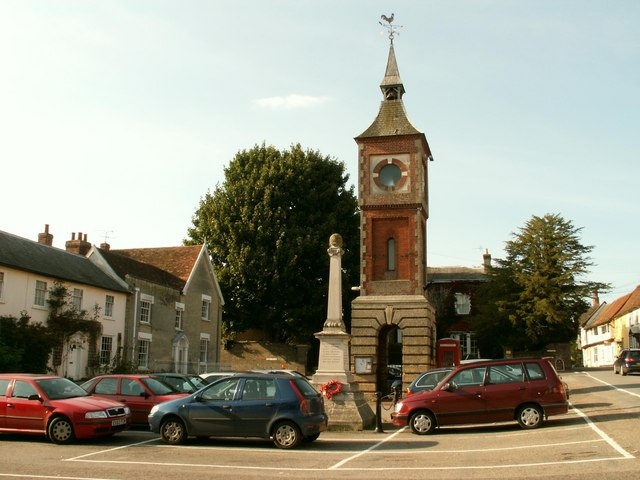

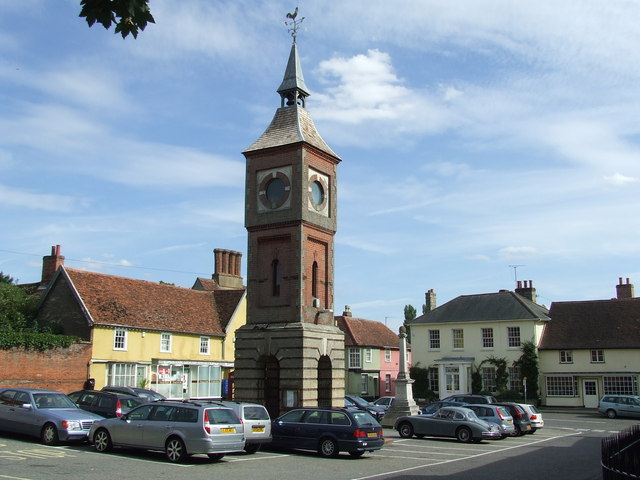

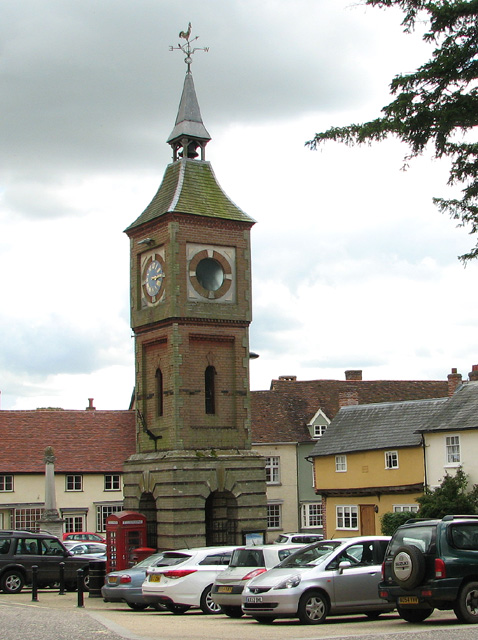

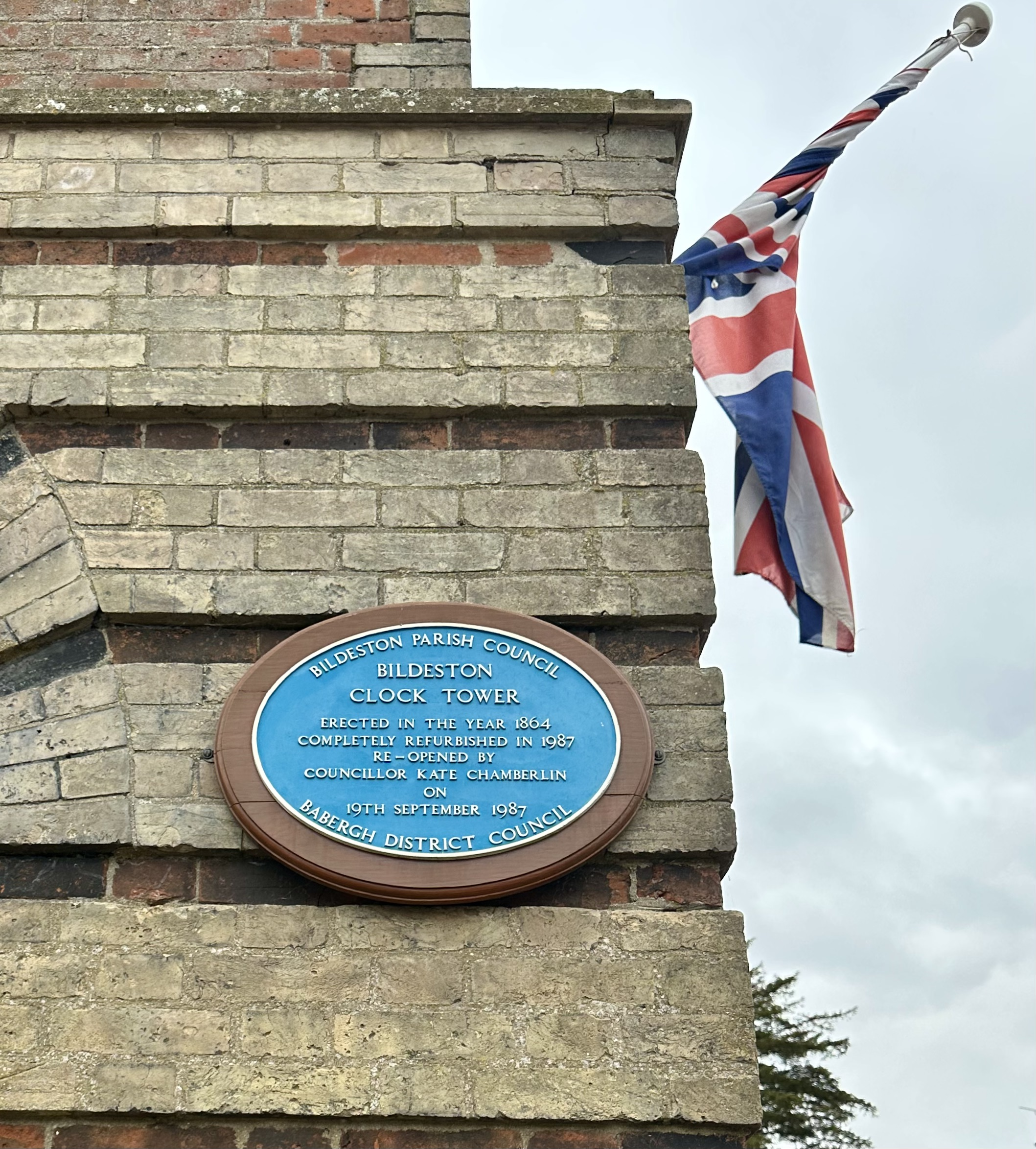

== See also ==
- List of clock towers in the United Kingdom
