= McKee Clock =

Clock tower in Bangor, Northern Ireland

Coordinates: 54.663°N 5.668°W

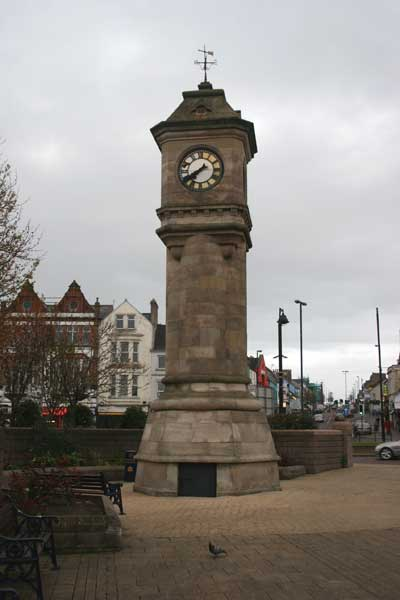
The McKee Clock

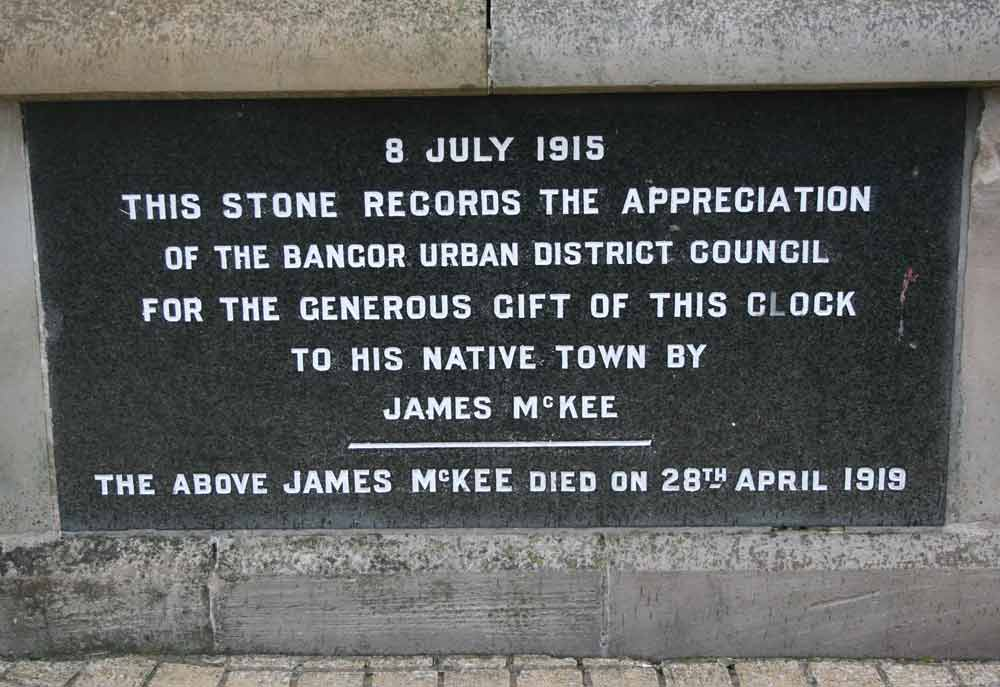
Inscription on the base of the clock

The McKee Clock is a clock tower in the City of Bangor, Northern Ireland. Situated at the foot of High Street in the marina's sunken gardens in an area known as the "McKee Clock Arena", the clock is named for its benefactor James McKee, a local rates collector who donated £200 (a very large sum of money at the time) towards its construction.

The clock was designed by Mr Bell, the town's surveyor, and built in 1915 by John McNeilly from stone quarried at Ballycullen, near Newtownards.

On the base of the clock, a black granite slab is engraved with the inscription "8 July 1915. This stone records the appreciation of the Bangor Urban District Council for the generous gift of this clock to his native town by James McKee. The above James McKee died on 28th April 1919".

During World War II the Luftwaffe dropped a bomb that landed on the top of the clock. Fortunately little damage resulted.

The clock tower is a familiar sight to Bangor natives and visitors alike, and is a popular meeting place in the town.
