= Neil Brittain =

British journalist and television presenter

Neil Brittain is a Northern Irish born television executive and former sports journalist.

== Education ==
A native of Bangor, County Down where he attended Bangor Grammar School, Brittain graduated from Queen’s University Belfast in 2001 with a BA in English Language and Literature.

He then studied for a Postgraduate Diploma in Newspaper Journalism at the University of Ulster and his first job was with UTV in 2003.

== Broadcasting career ==
=== Ulster Television ===
In November 2004, Neil moved to the UTV Sport team, where he remains a reporter and presenter for UTV Live, UTV News and Sport and Sport on Sunday.

Among the stories he has covered in his time in the Sports department were the deteriorating health of George Best, providing live reports from the Cromwell Hospital, London in late 2005; the fortunes of Derry City in their UEFA Cup challenges from the Brandywell Stadium, from Fir Park in Motherwell and from the Parc des Princes for Derry's last matches in the campaign against Paris Saint-Germain. Brittain was UTV's reporter covering Ireland's matches in the 2007 Rugby World Cup.

He stayed with UTV until 2010 when he moved to a PR company in Holywood Co. Down

=== Ulster Rugby /IFA ===
In 2012 he was recruited by Ulster Rugby to head their communications team and remained there until 2015 when he joined the Irish Football Association as Director of Communications and Strategy.

=== BBC NI ===
In May 2019 he rejoined the world of broadcasting again when he became the Executive Editor or Head of Sport for BBC Northern Ireland.

== Charity work ==
In July 2010, Brittain cycled from Bexleyheath to Paris with 81 other cyclists to raise money for Christian Aid.

== Personal life ==
He was married to Rachel in Down Cathedral in August 2006.
