= SS Ballyholme Bay =

A number of steamships have carried the name Ballyholme Bay.

- SS Ballyholme Bay (1908), built by Sunderland Shipbuilding Co Ltd as Odland, served as Ballyholme Bay 1947–52
- SS Ballyholme Bay (1942), a Type N3-S ship built as Anthony Enright, served as Ballyholme Bay 1952–53
