= W. P. Nicholson =

Preacher in Northern Ireland (1876–1959)

William Patteson Nicholson (3 April 1876 – 29 October 1959) was a Presbyterian preacher and evangelist born in Bangor, County Down, Northern Ireland.

== Biography ==
Nicknamed "the Tornado of the Pulpit", Nicholson spent his early years on his father's cargo ship. He began to preach Christianity in 1899 at the age of 23 and was known for his "men-only" meetings. Nicholson used straightforward language which communicated to the common man.

In the Belfast shipyard of Harland & Wolff, a shed, named "the Nicholson shed", was erected to house stolen tools that newly converted workers were returning as a result of Nicholson's preaching.

== Works ==
- Goodbye God: Twelve Stirring Messages (Stanley Barnes, 1998)

== Bibliography ==
- Barnes, Stanley All for Jesus: The Life of W.P. Nicholson, Ambassador Intl, 1996, ISBN 978-1-898787-83-9
- Murray, S W W P Nicholson: Flame for God in Ulster, Presbyterian Fellowship, Belfast, 1973
- Ravenhill, Leonard Billy Nicholson - The Irish Whitefield
