= Matty Burrows =

Northern Irish footballer (born 1985)

Personal information
- Full name: Matthew Burrows
- Date of birth: 15 October 1985 (age 41)
- Place of birth: Newtownards, Northern Ireland
- Position: Forward

Senior career*
Years	Team	Apps	(Gls)
2006–2008	Dundela		
2008	→ Loughgall (loan)		
2008–2012	Glentoran	49	(16)
2012	Glenavon	9	(3)
2013	Ards	14	(1)
2014–2015	Harland & Wolff Welders	9	(1)
2015–2016	Dundela	0	(0)
- * Club domestic league appearances and goals

Matthew Burrows (born 15 October 1985) is a former professional football player from Northern Ireland who played as a midfielder.

Burrows scored a jumping backheel volley goal against Portadown to seal victory for Glentoran in injury-time of a match on 5 October 2010. The "astonishing goal" came from the back of Burrows' heel from 16 yards out in mid-air. The goal received international acclaim, with millions viewing the goal on YouTube, and football programmes around the world broadcasting the goal to audiences unfamiliar with the Irish league. The goal drew comparisons with the likes of Lionel Messi and Cristiano Ronaldo.

The goal was shortlisted for the 2010 FIFA Puskás Award, which honours the player judged to have scored the "most beautiful" goal of the year. However, Burrows lost out at the Ballon d'Or awards ceremony on 10 January 2011 to Bayern Munich and Turkey midfielder Hamit Altıntop, for his volleyed goal in Turkey's UEFA Euro 2012 qualifying game against Kazakhstan on 3 September 2010.

In January 2012, he asked to go out on loan. After no club would meet his entire salary costs, he asked to be released from Glentoran. This request was granted and he agreed terms and signed for Glenavon until the end of the season.

== Personal life ==
Burrows attended Priory Integrated College in Holywood.
