= Ballyhalbert =

Village on the Ards Peninsula, Northern Ireland

Coordinates: 54.495°N 5.459°W

Ballyhalbert: Irish: Baile Thalbóid; Scots: Talbotstoun
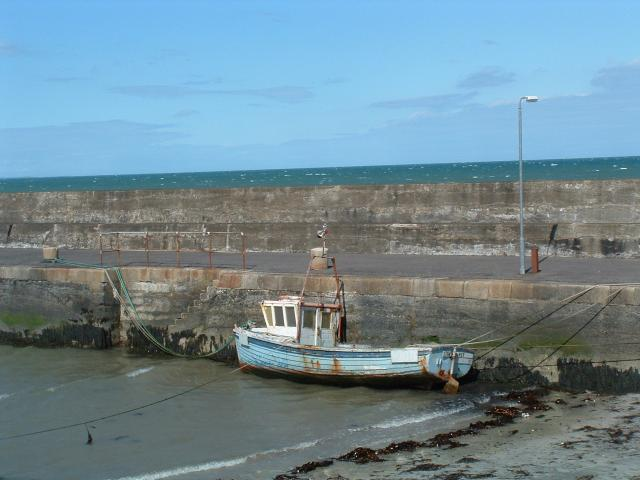
- Ballyhalbert Pier, April 2005

- Location within County Down
- Population: 1,266 (2021 Census)
- District: Ards and North Down
- County: County Down
- Country: Northern Ireland
- Sovereign state: United Kingdom
- Post town: NEWTOWNARDS
- Postcode district: BT22
- Dialling code: 028
- UK Parliament: Strangford
- NI Assembly: Strangford

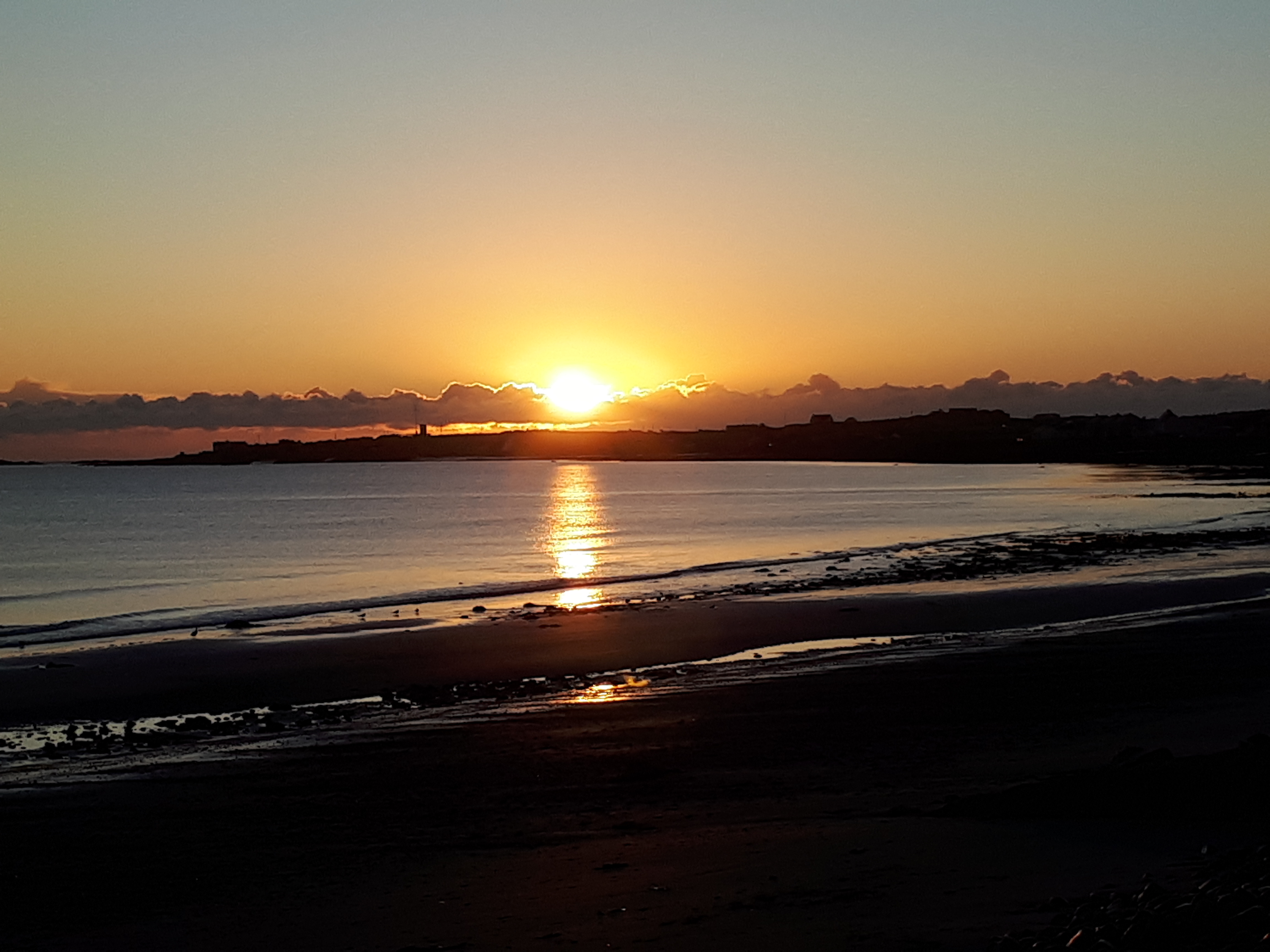
Ballyhalbert Sunrise

Ballyhalbert (formerly known as Talbotston and Halbertston) is a small village and townland in County Down, Northern Ireland. It is on the east (Irish Sea) coast of the Ards Peninsula between Ballywalter and Portavogie. It is largely residential and has a small harbour and large caravan site which was formerly a Royal Air Force (RAF) airfield, RAF Ballyhalbert, during World War II. It is within the Ards and North Down Borough. It had a population of 1,266 people in the 2021 census, up from 1,026 people in the 2011 census.

The easternmost settlement of Ireland, Burr Point, is within Ballyhalbert's environs.

== Name ==
Ballyhalbert was originally known as Talbotyston as far back as 1333; however by 1605 it had been Gaelicised as Ballitalbot, and as Ballihalbert by 1617. The modern Irish name is Baile Thalbóid. The Talbot family settled in the area following the Norman invasion of Ireland. The Talbots came from Herefordshire in England, and also settled in County Antrim and County Dublin.

== History ==
In May 1917 four vessels, the Saint Mungo, Derrymore, Amber and the Morion, were captured and sunk in Ballyhalbert Bay, by U-boat UC 65 under the command of Otto Steinbrinck, one of the most famous U-boat commanders of World War I.

The village played a major role during World War II when an RAF airfield, RAF Ballyhalbert, was built. It had the important role of protecting Belfast and the eastern half of Northern Ireland. During its lifetime, Ballyhalbert was home to RAF, Army, Navy and United States Army Air Forces (USAAF) personnel. The airfield was sold to developers in March 1960, and is in use for a caravan park and gated community known as Ballyhalbert Park Homes.

In stormy weather, although sea defences have been implemented, waves crashing against the coast leave debris on main roads. In the 21st century, a car park opposite the gospel hall has had numerous repairs to protect it from the sea.

== Education ==
Victoria Primary School serves the village. Glastry College is one mile from Ballyhalbert.

== See also ==
- List of towns in Northern Ireland
- List of villages in Northern Ireland
