= Bangor Old Custom House =

17th-century building located in Bangor, Northern Ireland

Coordinates: 54.6648°N 5.6674°W

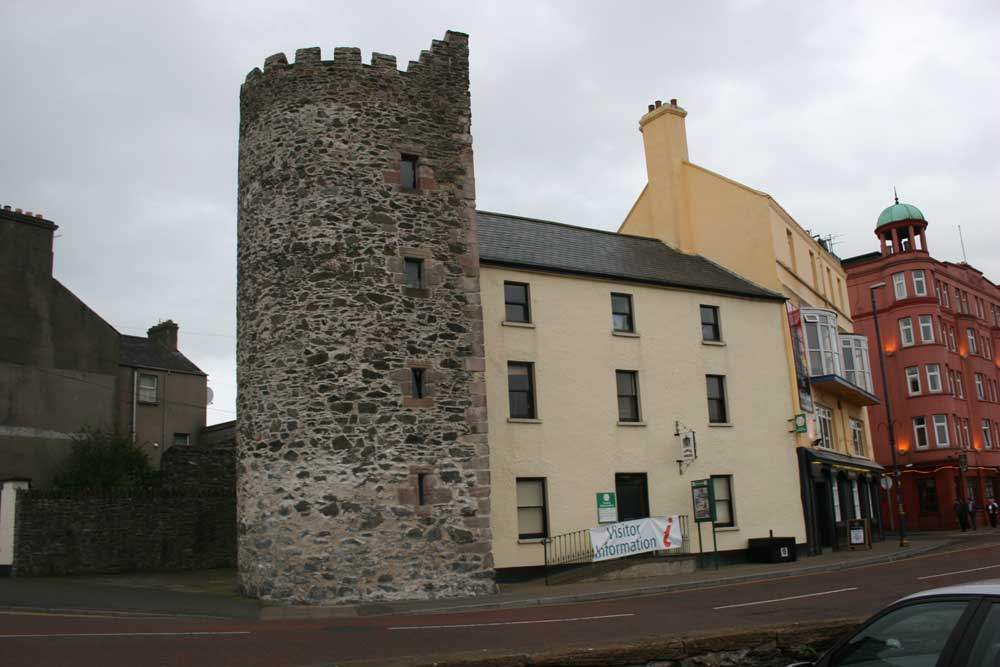
The Old Custom House

The Bangor Old Custom House or the Tower House is a notable historic structure located in Bangor, County Down, Northern Ireland. It is a 17th-century tower and adjoining tower house situated on the seafront, near the bottom of High Street of Bangor.

== History ==
Constructed in 1637 by James Hamilton, a Lowland Scot, the Bangor Old Custom House was originally built to serve as a custom house following the grant of port status to Bangor by King James I in 1620. The architecture of the tower is distinctive within Bangor and is considered rare in the broader region of Ulster.

Over the past three centuries, the building has been repurposed for various uses, including private residences, an antique shop, and even housing hot seawater baths. Its adaptability over time reflects the changing needs and character of the city.

In 1979, the Old Custom House was added to the "List of Buildings of Special Interest" by the Historic Buildings Branch of the Department of the Environment (D.o.E.), ensuring its preservation. Today, the building functions as the Council's Tourist Information Centre.

It is located at by the Coast Guard building very near the bottom of High Street in Bangor, Co.Down.
