= Glastry College =

Location
- Victoria Road; Ballyhalbert, Down, BT22 1DQ; United Kingdom

Information
- Type: Secondary School
- Established: 1957
- Local authority: SEELB
- Principal: Alan Hutchinson
- Gender: Boys & Girls
- Age: 11 to 18
- Enrolment: Approx. 650
- Houses: Dunleath, McCormick, Montgomery, Nugent
- Website: https://glastrycollege.org.uk

Glastry College is an academic secondary school situated in Ballyhalbert, County Down in Northern Ireland. Opened in 1957, the school has over 650 pupils age 11 to 18. Pupils are members of one of four house groups - McCormick, Montgomery, Nugent, and Dunleath.

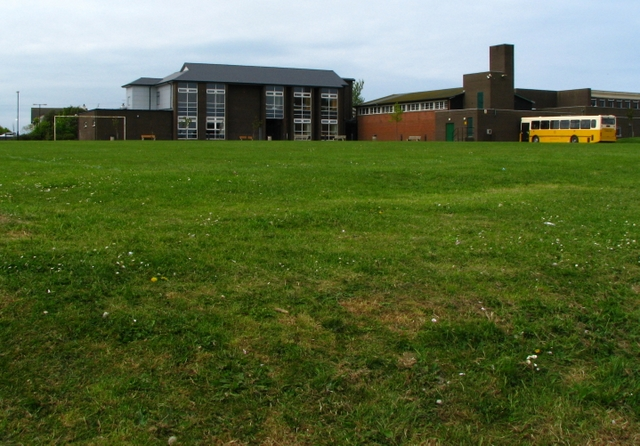
Glastry College from the school's football pitch
