= Bangor, County Down =

City in Northern Ireland

Coordinates: 54.66°N 5.67°W

Bangor: Irish: Beannchar
- City
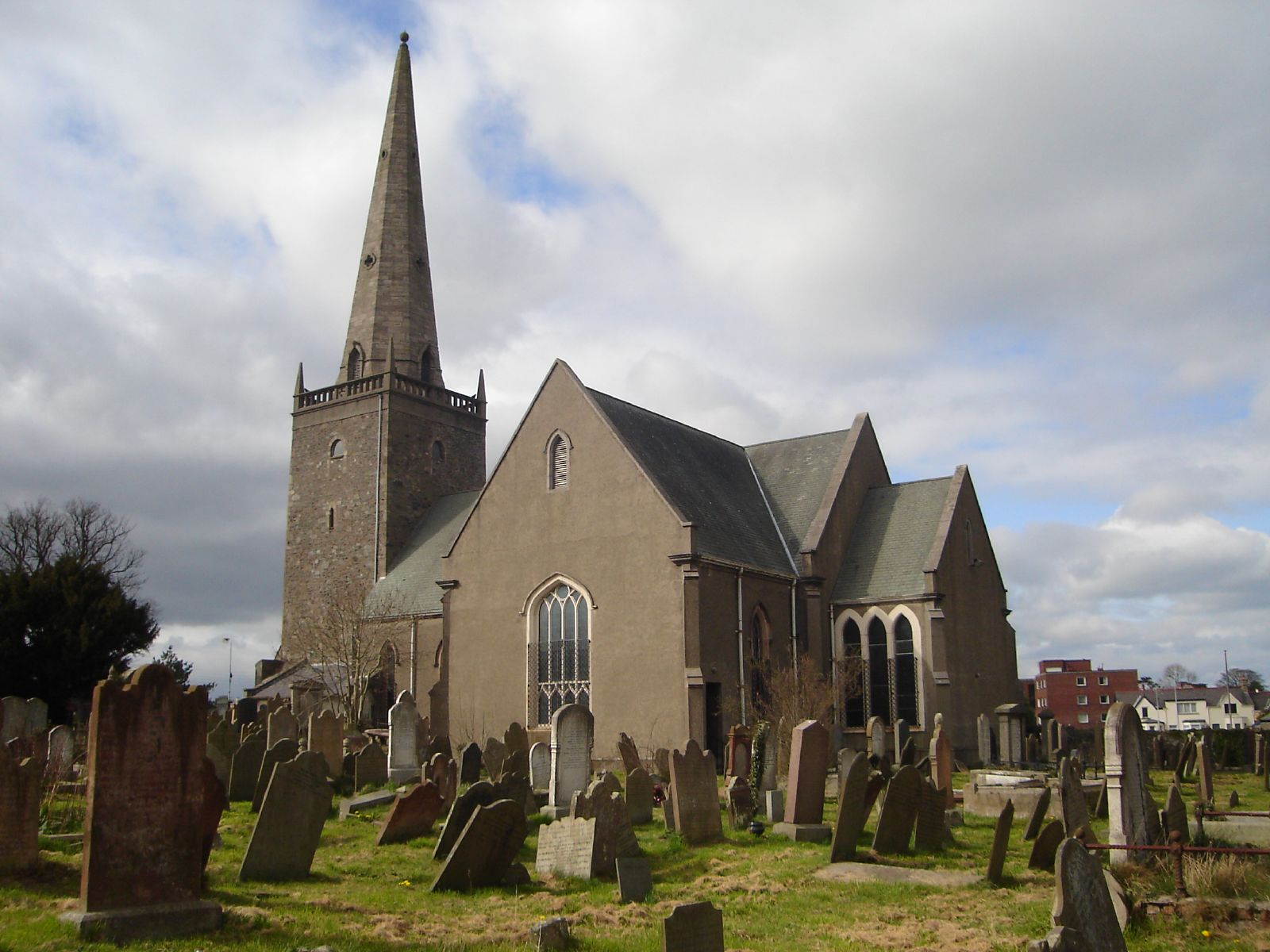
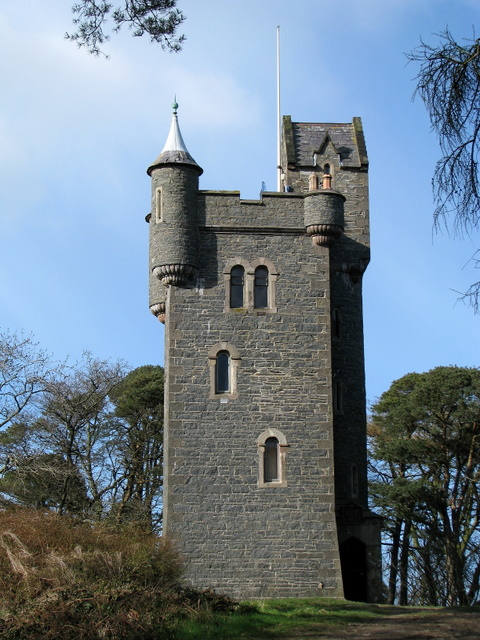
- Bangor Marina Bangor Castle Bangor Abbey McKee Clock Helen's Tower

- Coat of Arms

- Location within County Down
- Population: 64,596 (2021)
  - Belfast: 13 mi (21 km)
- District: Ards and North Down Borough
- County: County Down
- Country: Northern Ireland
- Sovereign state: United Kingdom
- Post town: BANGOR
- Postcode district: BT19, BT20
- Dialling code: 028
- Police: Northern Ireland
- Fire: Northern Ireland
- Ambulance: Northern Ireland
- UK Parliament: North Down
- NI Assembly: North Down

Bangor (/ˈbæŋɡər/ BANG-gər; from Irish Beannchar [ˈbʲaːn̪ˠəxəɾˠ]) is a seaside city and civil parish in County Down, Northern Ireland, on the southern side of Belfast Lough. It is within the Belfast metropolitan area and is 13 miles (22 km) east of Belfast city centre, to which it is linked by the A2 road and the Belfast–Bangor railway line. The population was 64,596 at the 2021 census.

Bangor Abbey was an important and influential monastery founded in the 6th century by Saint Comgall. Bangor grew during the 17th century Plantation of Ulster, when many Scottish settlers arrived. Today, tourism is important to the local economy, particularly in the summer months, and plans are being made for the long-delayed redevelopment of the seafront; a notable historical building in the city is Bangor Old Custom House. The largest plot of private land in the area, the Clandeboye Estate, which is a few miles from the city centre, belonged to the Marchioness of Dufferin and Ava. Bangor hosts the Royal Ulster and Ballyholme yacht clubs. Bangor Marina is one of the largest in Ireland, and holds Blue Flag status. Bangor was granted city status in 2022 as part of Elizabeth II's Platinum Jubilee, becoming Northern Ireland's sixth city.

== Name ==
The name Bangor comes from Irish: Beannchar, from Middle Irish: Beannchor and Old Irish: Bennchor. This is thought to mean 'place of points' or 'horned curve', referring to the shoreline of Bangor Bay. The Old Irish tale, Táin Bó Fraích, gives a fanciful explanation for the name. It tells how the Connacht warrior Fráech and the Ulster warrior Conall Cernach were returning to Ireland from the Alps with Fráech's cattle. When they came to shore at what is now Bangor Bay, the cattle shed their horns, thus giving rise to the name Trácht mBennchoir, "the strand of the horn-casting".

Bangor Bay was originally called Inber Beg (Inver Beg), 'the little inlet or rivermouth', after the now-culverted stream which ran past the abbey. It was also recorded as Inber Bece. The area was also known as 'The Vale of Angels', as Saint Patrick is said to have once rested there and had a vision of angels.

== History ==
Historical population
Year	Pop.	±%
1821	2,943	—
1831	2,741	−6.9%
1841	3,116	+13.7%
1851	2,849	−8.6%
1861	2,531	−11.2%
1871	2,560	+1.1%
1881	3,006	+17.4%
1891	3,834	+27.5%
1901	5,903	+54.0%
1911	7,776	+31.7%
1926	13,311	+71.2%
1937	15,769	+18.5%
1951	20,610	+30.7%
1961	23,862	+15.8%
1966	26,921	+12.8%
1971	35,260	+31.0%
1981	46,585	+32.1%
1991	52,437	+12.6%
2001	58,388	+11.3%
2011	61,011	+4.5%
2021	64,596	+5.9%

Bangor has a long and varied history, from the Bronze Age people whose swords were discovered in 1949 or the Viking burial found on Ballyholme beach, to the Victorian pleasure seekers who travelled on the new railway from Belfast to take in the sea air. The city has been the site of a Gaelic Irish monastery renowned throughout Europe for its learning and scholarship, the victim of violent Viking raids in the 8th and 9th centuries, and the new home of Scottish and English planters during the Plantation of Ulster.

=== Bangor Abbey ===
The Annals of Ulster says that the monastery of Bangor was founded by Saint Comgall from Antrim in the year 555, while other annals give the year as 558. It was where the Antiphonary of Bangor (Antiphonarium Benchorense) was written, a copy of which can be seen in the town's heritage centre. The monastery had such widespread influence that the city is one of only four places in Ireland to be named in the Hereford Mappa Mundi in 1300. The monastery, situated roughly where the Church of Ireland Bangor Abbey stands at the head of the city, became a centre of great learning and was among the most eminent of Europe's missionary institutions in the Early Middle Ages.

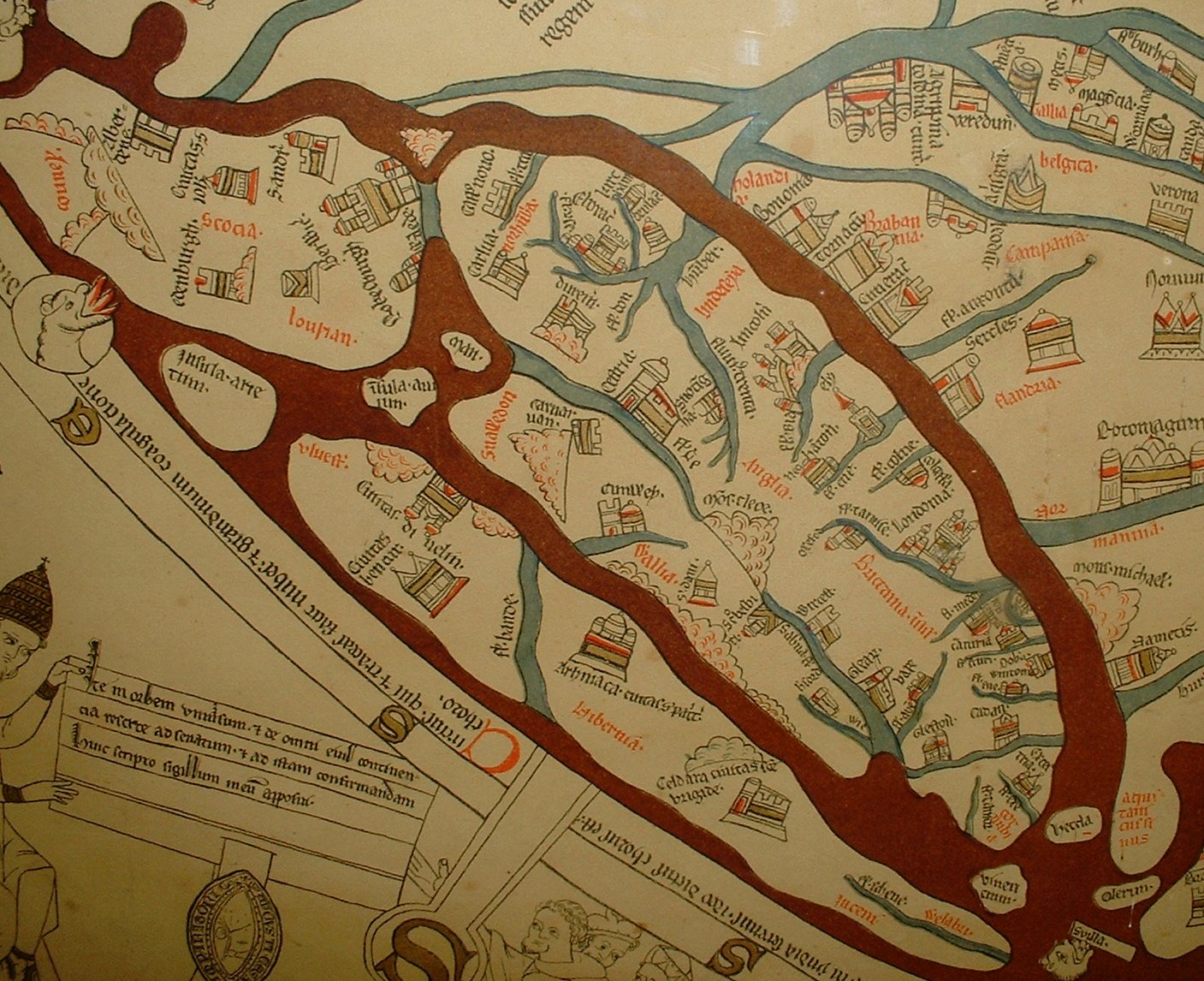
The Hereford Mappa Mundi

At Bangor, Comgall instituted a rigid monastic rule of incessant prayer and fasting. Far from turning people away, this ascetic rule attracted thousands. When Comgall died in 602, the annals report that three thousand monks looked to him for guidance. Named Bennchor Mór, "the great Bangor", to distinguish it from its British contemporaries, it became the greatest monastic school in Ulster as well as one of the three leading monasteries of Celtic Christianity. The others were Iona, the great missionary centre founded by Columba, and Bangor on the Dee, founded by Dinooth; the ancient Welsh Triads also confirm the "Perpetual Harmonies" at the house.

Throughout the sixth century, Bangor became famous for its choral psalmody. "It was this music which was carried to the continent by the Bangor missionaries in the following century". Divine services of the seven hours of prayer were carried out throughout Bangor's existence, however the monks went further and carried out the practice of laus perennis. In the twelfth century, Bernard of Clairvaux spoke of Comgall and Bangor, stating, "the solemnization of divine offices was kept up by companies, who relieved each other in succession, so that not for one moment day and night was there an intermission of their devotions." This continuous singing was antiphonal in nature, based on the call and response reminiscent of Patrick's vision, but also practised by St. Martin's houses in France. Many of these psalms and hymns were later written down in the Antiphonary of Bangor which came to reside in Colombanus' monastery at Bobbio, Italy.

In 580, a Bangor monk named Mirin took Christianity to Paisley in the west of Scotland, where he died "full of sanctity and miracles". In 590, the fiery Colombanus, one of Comgall's leaders, set out from Bangor with twelve other brothers, including Saint Gall who planted monasteries throughout Switzerland. In Burgundy, Columbanus established a severe monastic rule at Luxeuil which mirrored that of Bangor. From there he went to Bobbio in Italy and established the house which became one of the largest monasteries in Europe.

Saint Malachy was elected abbot of the monastery in 1123, a year before being consecrated Bishop of Connor. His extensive travels around Europe inspired him to rejuvenate the monasteries in Ireland, and he replaced the existing wooden huts with stone buildings.

=== 17th and 18th centuries ===
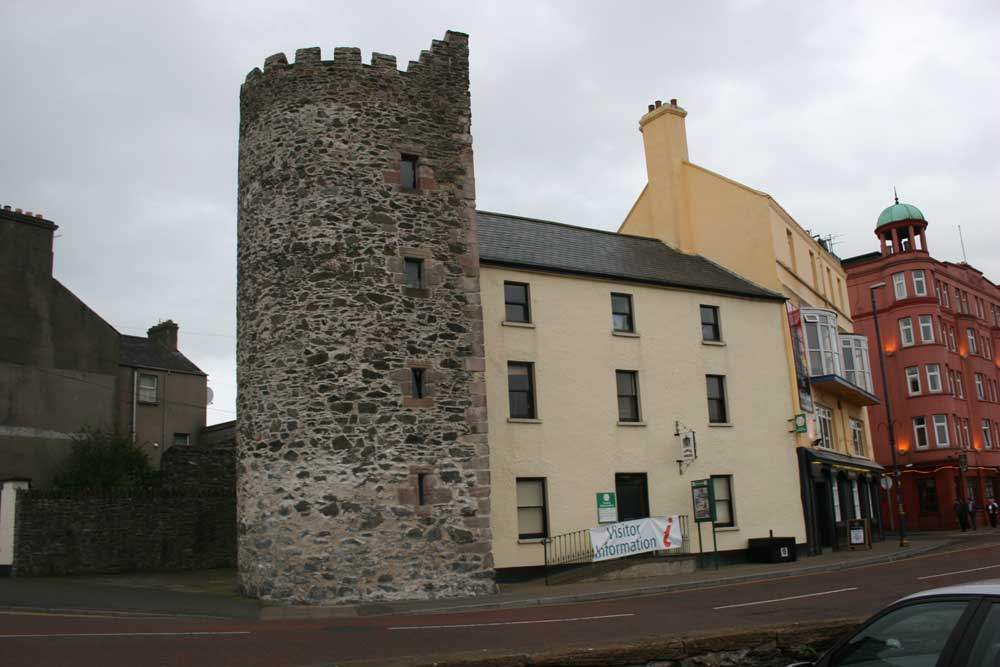
The Old Custom House

The modern city had its origins in the early 17th century when James Hamilton, a Lowland Scot, arrived in Bangor, having been granted lands in North Down by King James VI and I in 1605. In 1612, King James made Bangor a borough which permitted it to elect two MPs to the Irish Parliament in Dublin. The Old Custom House, which was completed by Hamilton in 1637 after James I granted Bangor the status of a port in 1620, is a visible reminder of the new order introduced by Hamilton and his Scots settlers.

In 1689 during the Williamite War in Ireland, Marshal Schomberg's expedition landed at Ballyholme Bay and captured Bangor, before going on to besiege Carrickfergus. Schomberg's force went south to Dundalk Camp and were present at the Battle of the Boyne the following year.

The city was an important source of customs revenue for the Crown and in the 1780s Colonel Robert Ward improved the harbour and promoted the cotton industries; today's seafront was the location of several large steam-powered cotton mills, which employed a large workforce.

The end of the 18th century was a time of great political and social turmoil in Ireland. The United Irishmen, inspired by the American and French Revolutions, sought to achieve a greater degree of independence from Britain. On the morning of 10 June during the Irish Rebellion of 1798, a force of United Irishmen, mainly from Bangor, Donaghadee, Greyabbey and Ballywalter attempted to occupy the nearby town of Newtownards. They met with musket fire from the market house and were subsequently defeated.

=== Victorian era ===
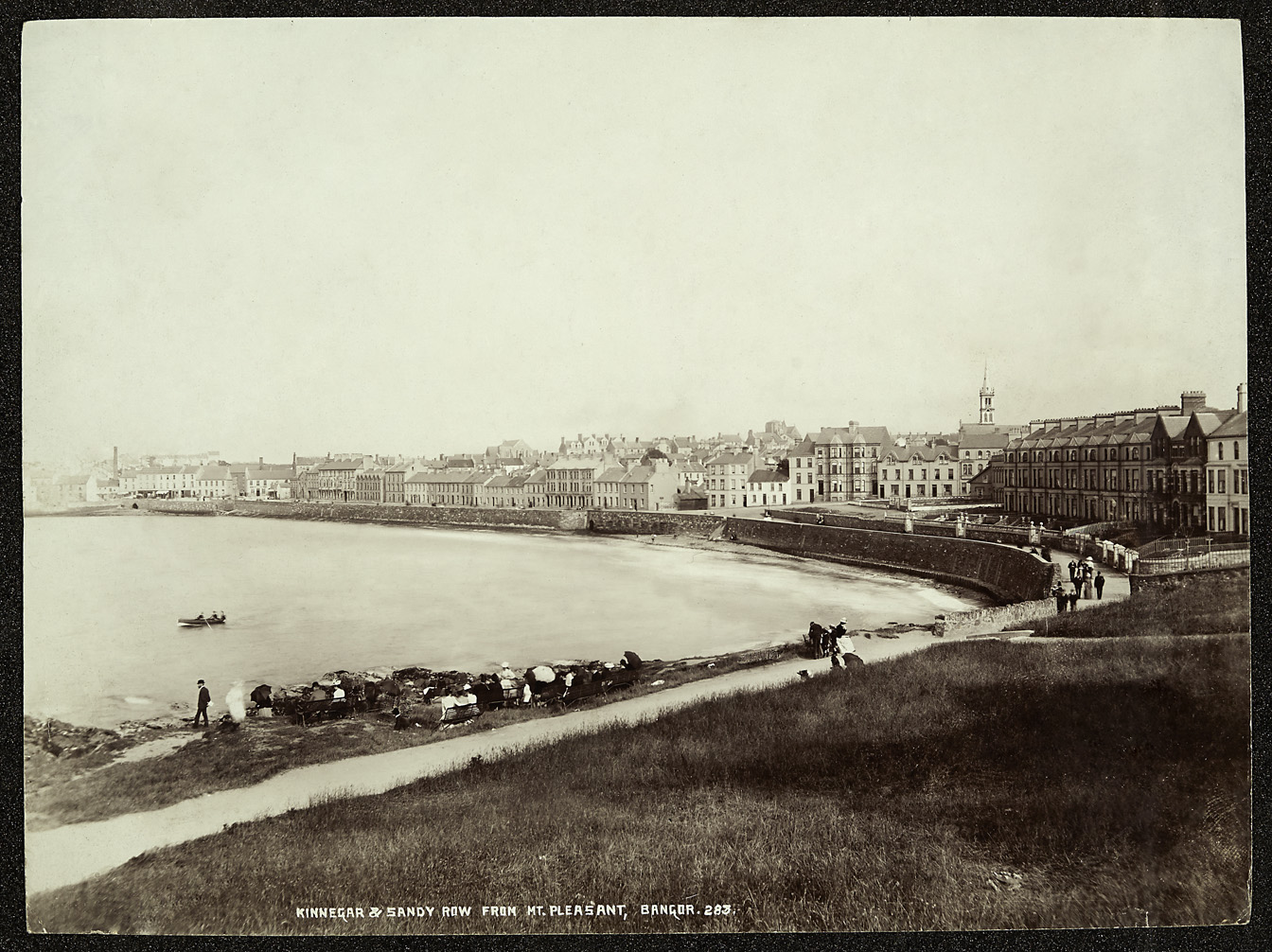
Bangor in 1914

By the middle of the 19th century, the cotton mills had declined and the city changed in character once again. The laying of the railway in 1865 meant that inexpensive travel from Belfast was possible, and working-class people could afford for the first time to holiday in the city. Bangor soon became a fashionable resort for Victorian holidaymakers, as well as a desirable home to the wealthy. Many of the houses overlooking Bangor Bay (some of which have been demolished to make way for modern flats) date from this period. The belief in the restorative powers of the sea air meant that the city became a location for sea bathing and marine sports, and the number of visitors from Great Britain increased during the Edwardian era at the beginning of the 20th century, which also saw the improvement of Ward Park.

=== 20th century to present ===
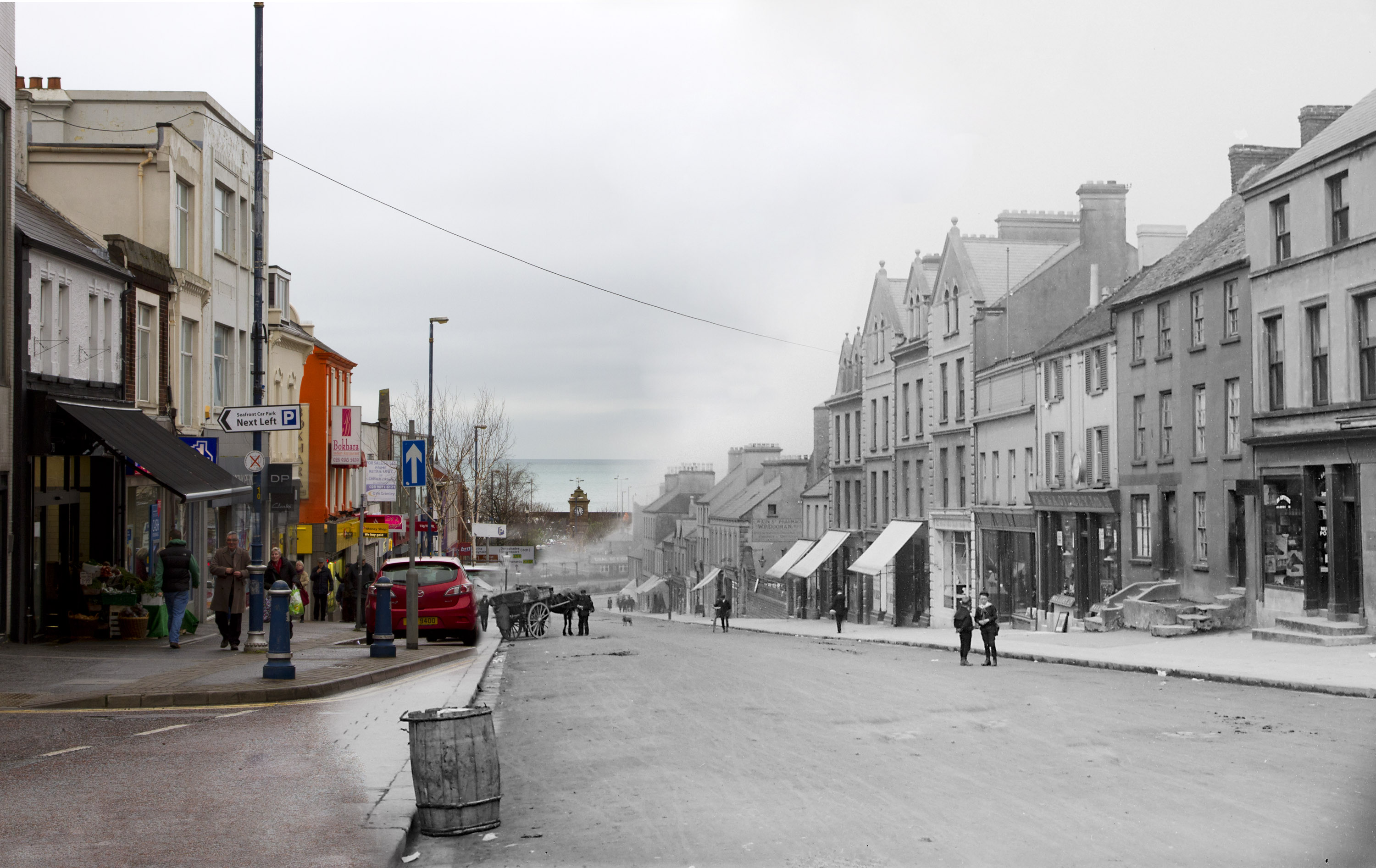
Bangor's main street in 1910 and 2015

The inter-war period of the early 20th century saw the development of the Tonic Cinema, Pickie Pool and Caproni's ballroom. All three were among the foremost of their type in Ireland, although they no longer exist. However, there is a park which replaced Pickie Pool named Pickie Fun Park. A children's paddling pool was created as the original Pickie Pool was demolished due to the rejuvenation of Bangor seafront in the 1980s and early 1990s. Pickie Fun Park closed in early 2011 to be refurbished and modernised. The park, which reopened in March 2012, has an 18-hole maritime themed mini golf course, children's electric cars and splash pads (replacing the old children's paddling pool). Also, the Pickie Puffer steam train has been given an updated route and the swans have a new lagoon.

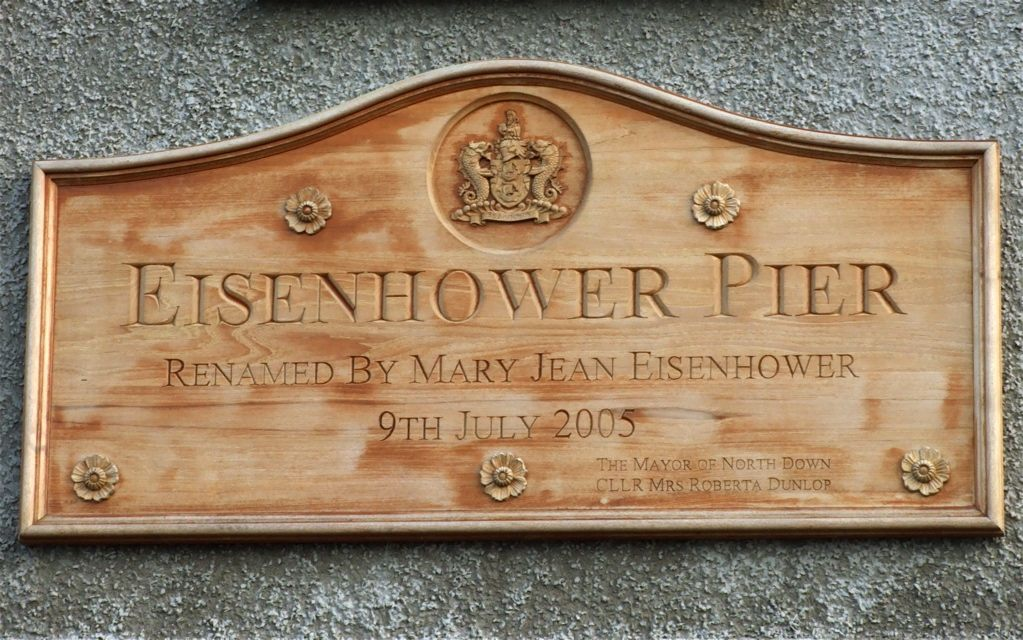
Commemorative plaque on the Eisenhower Pier

During World War II, General Dwight D. Eisenhower addressed Allied troops in Bangor, who were departing to take part in the D-Day landings. In 2005, his granddaughter Mary-Jean Eisenhower came to the city to oversee the renaming of the marina's North Pier to the Eisenhower Pier.

With the growing popularity of inexpensive foreign holidays from the 1960s onwards, Bangor declined as a tourist resort and was forced to rethink its future. The second half of the 20th century saw its role as a dormitory town for Belfast become more important. Its population increased dramatically; from around 14,000 in 1930 it had reached 40,000 by 1971 and 58,000 by the end of the century (the 2001 census showed the population as 76,403).

The 1970s saw the building of the Springhill Shopping Centre, an out-of-town development near the A2 road to Belfast and Northern Ireland's first purpose-built shopping centre. It has since been demolished to facilitate a modern Tesco supermarket.

In the early 1990s, Bloomfield Shopping Centre, another out-of-town development, opened beside Bloomfield Estate. In 2007, a major renovation of the centre began, including the construction of a multistorey car park. The trend towards out-of-town shopping centres was somewhat reversed with the construction of the Flagship Centre around 1990. The Flagship Centre went into administration and was closed in January 2019, it is currently undergoing appraisal for re-development options.

The former seafront of the city is awaiting redevelopment and has been for over two decades, with a large part of the frontage already demolished, leaving a patch of derelict ground facing onto the marina. A great deal of local controversy surrounds this process and the many plans put forward by the council and developers for the land. In November 2009 it was voted by UTV viewers as Ulster's Biggest Eyesore. A state of the art recycling centre has been built in Balloo Industrial Estate which is supposed to be one of the most advanced in Europe. It opened in the summer of 2008.

In May 2022, it was announced that, as part of the Platinum Jubilee Civic Honours, Bangor would be granted city status by Letters Patent. It received the status on 2 December 2022, becoming Northern Ireland's sixth city, alongside Armagh, Belfast, Derry, Lisburn, and Newry.

=== The Troubles ===
Despite escaping much of the sectarian violence during The Troubles, Bangor was the site of some major incidents. During the Troubles there were eight murders in the city including that of the first Royal Ulster Constabulary (RUC) woman to be murdered on duty; 26-year-old Mildred Harrison was killed by an explosion from a UVF bomb while on foot patrol in the High Street on 16 March 1975. On 23 March 1972 the IRA detonated two large car bombs on the town's main street.

On 30 March 1974, paramilitaries carried out a major incendiary bomb attack on the main shopping centre in Bangor. On 21 October 1992, an IRA unit from the lower Ormeau exploded a 200-pound (91 kg) bomb in Main Street, causing large amounts of damage to nearby buildings.

Main Street sustained more damage on 7 March 1993, when the IRA exploded a 500-pound (230 kg) car bomb. Four RUC officers were injured in the explosion; the cost of the damage was later estimated at £2 million, as there was extensive damage to retail premises and Trinity Presbyterian Church, as well as minor damage to the local Church of Ireland Parish Church and First Bangor Presbyterian Church.

== Coat of arms ==
The shield is emblazoned with two ships, which feature the Red Hand of Ulster on their sails, denoting that Bangor is in the province of Ulster. The blue and white stripes on the shield show that Bangor is a seaside city. Supporting the shield are two sea-horses, signifying Bangor's links with the sea. Each is charged with a gold roundel; the left featuring a shamrock to represent Ireland, and the right featuring a bull's head, possibly in reference to the derivation of the city's name. The arms are crested by a haloed St Comgall, founder of the city's abbey, who was an important figure in the spread of Christianity. The motto reads Beannchor, the archaic form of the city's name in Irish.

== Governance ==
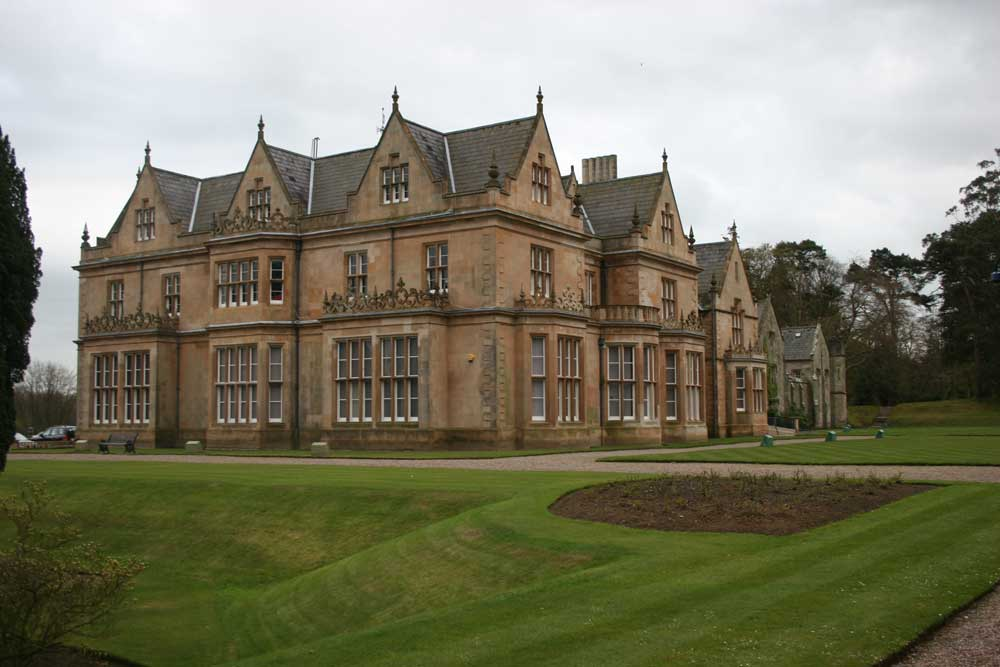
Bangor Castle

Bangor is administered by Ards and North Down Borough Council which is based at Bangor Castle.

== Geography ==
Bangor lies on the east coast of Northern Ireland, on the south shore of the mouth of Belfast Lough, north east of central Belfast.

=== Townlands ===
Bangor city includes the following townlands:

- Balloo (from Irish Baile Aodha, meaning 'Hugh's townland')
- Ballycroghan (from Irish Baile Cruacháin, meaning 'townland of the small stack/hill')
- Ballygrainey Ballygrainey railway station
- Ballyholme (probably meaning "townland of the river meadow")
- Ballykillare (from Irish Baile Cille Láir, meaning 'townland of the central church')
- Ballymaconnell (from Irish Baile Mhic Dhónaill, meaning 'McConnell's townland')
- Ballymacormick (from Irish Baile Mhic Cormaic, meaning 'McCormick's townland')
- Ballymagee (from Irish Baile Mhic Aodha, meaning 'Magee's townland')
- Ballyree (from Irish Baile an Fhraoigh, meaning 'townland of the heather')
- Ballyvarnet, historically 'Ballyvernan' (from Irish Baile Bhearnan, meaning 'townland of the gap')
- Carnalea (from Irish Carnán Lao, meaning 'the cairn of the calf')
- Conlig (from Irish An Choinleac, meaning 'the hound-stone', referring to a standing stone on Runestone Hill)
- Rathgill or Rathgael (from Irish Ráth Giall, meaning 'fort of the hostages')

=== Ballyholme Bay ===
The sea area to the north east of Bangor is Ballyholme Bay, named for the township of Ballyholme in the east of the town. During World War II the bay was used as a base for American troops training for the Normandy Landings. Two ships have been named SS Ballyholme Bay. In 1903 a Viking grave was found on the shore at Ballyholme Bay: it contained two bronze brooches, a bowl, a fragment of chain and some textile material. It has been said that "Ballyholme Bay is a sheltered bay and studies have suggested that it is one of the best landing places on Belfast Lough and would therefore have made a good location for a Viking base. It is possible that the burial was associated with a Viking settlement in the area." In 1689 Field Marshal Schomberg landed with 10,000 troops either at Ballyholme Bay or at Groomsport, a little further east.

== Demography ==
=== 2021 census ===
On census day (21 March 2021) there were 64,596 people living in Bangor. Of these:

- 66.62% belong to or were brought up in a 'Protestant and Other Christian (including Christian related)' religion and 12.67% belong to or were brought up in the Catholic Christian faith.
- 67.38% indicated that they had a British national identity, 41.06% had a Northern Irish national identity and 10.30% had an Irish national identity (respondents could indicate more than one national identity).

=== 2011 census ===
On census day (27 March 2011) there were 61,011 people living in Bangor, accounting for 3.37% of the NI total. Of these:

- 18.83% were aged under 16 years and 17.40% were aged 65 and over;
- 52.14% of the usually resident population were female and 47.86% were male;
- 74.84% belong to or were brought up in a 'Protestant and Other Christian (including Christian related)' religion and 11.99% belong to or were brought up in the Catholic Christian faith.
- 72.51% indicated that they had a British national identity, 32.95% had a Northern Irish national identity and 8.05% had an Irish national identity (respondents could indicate more than one national identity);
- 41 years was the average (median) age of the population;
- 7.94% had some knowledge of Ulster-Scots and 2.72% had some knowledge of Irish (Gaelic).

== Economy ==
Bangor had an estimated Gross Domestic Product (GDP) of the equivalent of $US678 million in 2015. In 2021, there were 385 businesses in the city centre.

== Education ==
Colleges and schools in the area include South Eastern Regional College, Bangor Academy and Sixth Form College, Bangor Grammar School, Glenlola Collegiate School, and St Columbanus' College. Primary schools include Towerview Primary School, Clandeboye Primary, Ballyholme Primary School, Kilmaine Primary, St Malachy's Primary, St Comgall's Primary, Grange Park Primary, Ballymagee Primary, Bloomfield Primary, Kilcooley Primary, Rathmore Primary, Towerview Primary, and Bangor Central Integrated Primary School.

There are also a number of secondary, grammar, and primary schools in nearby towns and the vicinity of Bangor such as Crawfordsburn Primary & Groomsport Primary; Priory Integrated College, Sullivan Upper School, Regent House Grammar School, Movilla High School, Strangford College, Campbell College, and Rockport School are secondary schools.

== Tourism ==
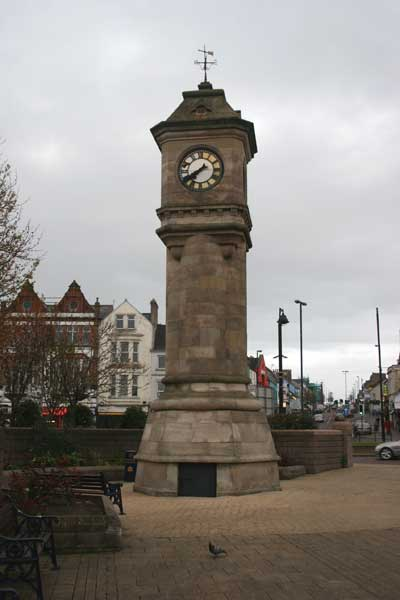
The McKee Clock

- Bangor Marina
- Clandeboye Estate
- Ward Park
- Clandeboye Park
- Bangor Abbey
- Bangor Carnegie Library
- Bangor New Cemetery
- Bangor Castle
- Somme Heritage Centre
- Bangor Old Custom House
- McKee Clock

== Climate ==
Like the rest of Northern Ireland, Bangor has a mild climate with few extremes of weather. It enjoys one of the sunniest climates in Northern Ireland, and receives about 970 millimetres (38 in) of rain per year. Snow is rare but occurs at least once or twice in an average winter and frost is not as severe as areas further inland. This is due to the mild winters and close proximity to the sea. Winter maxima are about 8 °C (46 °F) but can reach as high as 17 °C (63 °F). Average maxima in summer are around 20 °C (68 °F), and the record high is 28.8 °C (83.8 °F), owing to the moderating influence of the sea. The lowest recorded temperature is −6.2 °C (20.8 °F). Temperatures above 25 °C (77 °F) in Bangor can be uncomfortable due to the high humidity, with an apparent temperature in the high 20s.

Climate data for Bangor (Helens Bay), (Note: Weather station is located 2.8 miles (4.5 km) from Bangor town centre) elevation: 43 m (141 ft), 1991–2020 normals, extremes 1961–present
Month	Jan	Feb	Mar	Apr	May	Jun	Jul	Aug	Sep	Oct	Nov	Dec	Year
Record high °C (°F)	14.4 (57.9)	17.0 (62.6)	20.0 (68.0)	21.2 (70.2)	26.0 (78.8)	28.8 (83.8)	28.7 (83.7)	27.6 (81.7)	24.2 (75.6)	21.1 (70.0)	17.3 (63.1)	14.9 (58.8)	28.8 (83.8)
Mean daily maximum °C (°F)	7.7 (45.9)	8.5 (47.3)	10.3 (50.5)	12.7 (54.9)	15.6 (60.1)	18.0 (64.4)	19.6 (67.3)	19.4 (66.9)	17.3 (63.1)	13.8 (56.8)	10.2 (50.4)	8.1 (46.6)	13.5 (56.3)
Daily mean °C (°F)	5.4 (41.7)	5.7 (42.3)	7.0 (44.6)	8.9 (48.0)	11.4 (52.5)	13.9 (57.0)	15.5 (59.9)	15.5 (59.9)	13.8 (56.8)	10.8 (51.4)	7.7 (45.9)	5.8 (42.4)	10.1 (50.2)
Mean daily minimum °C (°F)	3.0 (37.4)	2.9 (37.2)	3.7 (38.7)	5.2 (41.4)	7.2 (45.0)	9.8 (49.6)	11.5 (52.7)	11.6 (52.9)	10.2 (50.4)	7.9 (46.2)	5.3 (41.5)	3.5 (38.3)	6.8 (44.2)
Record low °C (°F)	−4.9 (23.2)	−5.0 (23.0)	−5.0 (23.0)	−2.3 (27.9)	−1.1 (30.0)	2.1 (35.8)	5.0 (41.0)	4.8 (40.6)	1.6 (34.9)	0.0 (32.0)	−2.4 (27.7)	−6.2 (20.8)	−6.2 (20.8)
Average precipitation mm (inches)	92.5 (3.64)	74.7 (2.94)	72.0 (2.83)	61.6 (2.43)	63.4 (2.50)	71.5 (2.81)	76.7 (3.02)	82.8 (3.26)	72.1 (2.84)	97.8 (3.85)	103.4 (4.07)	99.1 (3.90)	967.7 (38.10)
Average precipitation days (≥ 1.0 mm)	14.7	12.5	12.3	11.3	11.9	11.3	12.9	13.2	11.4	13.3	15.4	14.8	155.1
Mean monthly sunshine hours	49.1	76.8	112.4	162.4	201.7	171.3	157.5	157.2	124.9	95.9	62.6	42.7	1,414.4
Source 1: Met Office
Source 2: Starlings Roost Weather

Bangor has had a number of extreme weather events, including hot summers in 2006, 2013 and 2018. The summers of 2007, 2008 and 2009 were some of the wettest on records with flooding in June 2007. The Autumn of 2006 was also the warmest recorded. December 2010 saw record snowfall fall on the town, with temperatures below −7 °C (19 °F). On 21 December 2010 an unofficial weather station staffed by a retired meteorological officer in the Springhill area recorded a low of −8.1 °C (17.4 °F), and a high of −2.0 °C (28.4 °F). Snow lay to a level depth of 24 cm (9.4 in), the same morning. Inland Northern Ireland saw almost −19 °C (−2 °F), new record lows. Like much of the UK, spring 2020 was the sunniest on record.

== Transport ==
=== Rail ===
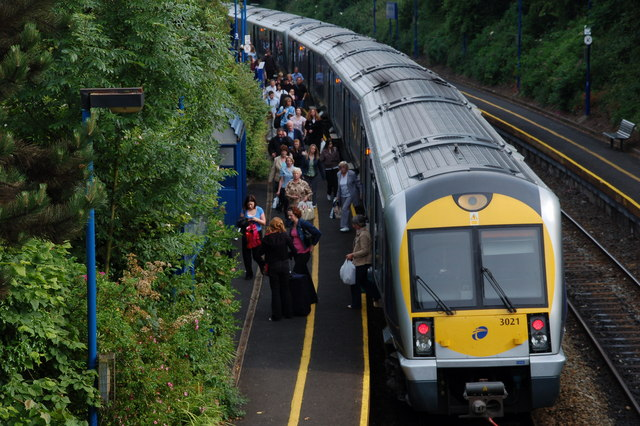
Bangor West railway station, NI Railways

The first section of Belfast and County Down Railway line from Belfast to Holywood opened in 1848 and was extended to Bangor by the Belfast, Holywood and Bangor Railway (BHBR), opening on 1 May 1865, along with Bangor railway station. It was acquired by the BCDR in 1884. and closed to goods traffic on 24 April 1950. Bangor West railway station was opened by the BCDR on 1 June 1928. Most of the BCDR's network was shut down by its successor, the Ulster Transport Authority (UTA) in 1950, two years after nationalisation and only the branch to Bangor survived. The line received a further blow in 1965 when it was isolated from the rest of the Irish railway system by closure of the Belfast Central Railway line from Ballymacarrett Junction (east of Queen’s Quay station in Belfast) to Central Junction, just west of the former GNR(I) Great Victoria Street station. Fortunately the connection was rebuilt in 1976 to allow Bangor line services to transfer to Belfast Central (now Lanyon Place) and run directly through to the rest of the Northern Ireland railway network.

Today the Belfast–Bangor line is operated by Translink's Northern Ireland Railways, which runs trains to Belfast.

=== Bus ===
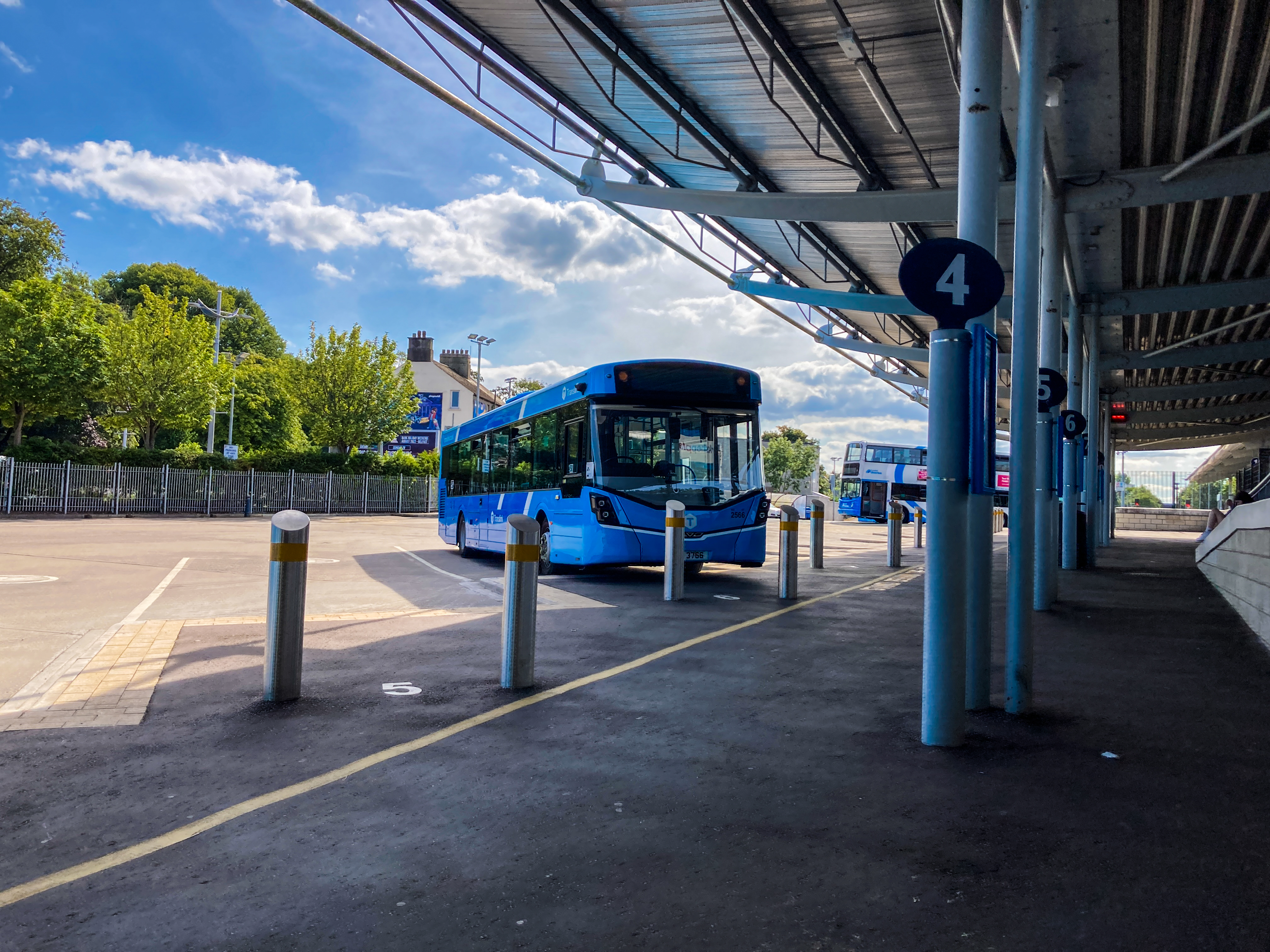
A view of the bus stands at the integrated Bus and Rail Centre.

Bangor is served by Ulsterbus, which aside from local town services, provides daily services to Belfast, Newtownards, Holywood and Donaghadee.

== Sport ==
=== Football ===
In football, NIFL Premiership sides Ards and Bangor play at Clandeboye Park on Clandeboye Road. Bangor also has a number of intermediate clubs, including Bryansburn Rangers, and Bangor Amateurs. Bangor also has a number of junior football clubs including Bangor Young Men, Bangor Swifts, 3rd Bangor Old boys FC, and Castle Juniors FC.

=== Hockey ===
Bangor has two hockey clubs that cater for both men's and women's hockey, respectively:

- Bangor Ladies Hockey Club : Bangor Ladies run three teams playing in Ulster Hockey Senior 3, Junior 7 and Junior 8b
- Bangor Mens Hockey Club : Bangor Mens run five teams with the 1st XI playing in the Ulster Hockey Premiership

=== Rugby Union ===
Bangor RFC plays in division 2C of the All-Ireland league at Upritchard Park.

=== Sailing ===
Bangor has clubs such as the Royal Ulster Yacht Club and Ballyholme Yacht Club which is the venue for Northern Ireland's Elite Sailing Facility.

=== Softball ===
North Down Softball Club (previously Bangor Buccaneers Softball Club, est. 2014) compete in the Softball Ulster League. Based at Ward Park the club comprises three competitive teams; the Buccaneers, the Barracudas (2023) & the Sluggers (2024)

=== Other sports ===
Bangor Aurora Aquatic and Leisure Complex includes Northern Ireland's only Olympic-size swimming pool.

== Music ==
The city has created an environment which has supported local musicians, such as Foy Vance and Snow Patrol. It is also home to Two Door Cinema Club.

== Notable people ==
- Iain Archer, musician (Snow Patrol)
- Jo Bannister, author and newspaper editor (County Down Spectator)
- Colin Bateman, author, screenwriter and journalist attended Bangor Grammar School (County Down Spectator)
- Edward Bingham, soldier; Victoria Cross recipient
- Colin Blakely, stage, film and TV actor
- Neil Brittain, news reporter
- Mike Bull, Commonwealth Games pole vaulter and decathlete
- Winifred Carney, suffragist and Irish independence activist
- Bryn Cunningham, Ulster Rugby player who attended Bangor Grammar School
- Samuel Cleland Davidson, inventor and engineer
- Kieron Dawson, Ulster Rugby player who attended Bangor Grammar School
- David Feherty, Professional golfer and now broadcaster, attended Bangor Grammar School
- Kelly Gallagher, MBE, British Winter Paralympic gold medallist
- Cherie Gardiner, former Miss Northern Ireland winner
- Keith Gillespie, N Ireland footballer, attended Rathmore Primary and Bangor Grammar School
- Christopher Gray, organist and choirmaster
- Billy Hamilton, former Northern Ireland international footballer
- Frederick Temple Hamilton-Temple-Blackwood, diplomat and third Governor General of Canada
- Eddie Izzard, comedian (grew up in Bangor until age five)
- Alan Kernaghan, ex-Republic of Ireland and Middlesbrough FC professional footballer
- Gary Lightbody, member of the band Snow Patrol
- Alex Lightbody, Former Northern Ireland, Irish and British Open Singles Champion Bangor Bowling Club
- Josh Magennis, professional footballer (Charlton Athletic; the Northern Irish National team)
- Stephen Martin, Olympic hockey gold medalist
- Mark McCall, Ulster rugby coach
- Mark McClelland, member of the band Snow Patrol
- Stuart McCloskey, professional rugby union player
- Rebecca McKenna, footballer
- Miles McMullan, aka Niall, author and naturalist
- William McWheeney, soldier; recipient of the Victoria Cross
- George McWhirter, author; winner with Chinua Achebe of the Commonwealth Poetry Prize inaugural Poet Laureate of Vancouver, Canada, former teacher at Bangor Grammar School
- Peter Millar, author; award-winning Sunday Times journalist
- Dick Milliken, Irish rugby and British Lion player attended Bangor Grammar School
- David Montgomery, media mogul
- Jamie Mulgrew, Northern Irish footballer (Linfield F.C.)
- Terry Neill, Arsenal F.C. captain (1962–63)
- W. P. Nicholson, Presbyterian preacher
- Lembit Öpik, former Liberal Democrat MP and Shadow Welsh and Shadow Northern Ireland Secretary
- Jonny Quinn, musician (Snow Patrol)
- Gillian Revie, former first soloist of the Royal Ballet
- Aimee Richardson, actress
- Glenn Ross, strongman, multiple Britain's Strongest Man & UK's Strongest Man Champion
- Zoe Salmon, Blue Peter presenter; former Miss Northern Ireland
- Ian Sansom, author
- Mark Simpson, BBC Ireland Correspondent
- Pete Snodden, DJ and radio host on Cool FM
- Patrick Taylor, author
- David Trimble, Nobel Laureate, former Ulster Unionist Party leader and former First Minister of Northern Ireland
- Paul Tweed, media lawyer
- Foy Vance, singer-songwriter

== Sister cities ==
Bangor is twinned with:

- Bregenz, Austria
- Virginia Beach, United States (since 2001)

== See also ==
- Bangor (civil parish)
- List of localities in Northern Ireland by population
- List of RNLI stations
- Market houses in Northern Ireland
- Kilcooley estate
- Woodlands Juvenile Justice Centre
