= Bangor Marina =

Largest marina in Northern Ireland

Coordinates: 54°39′51″N 5°40′17″W

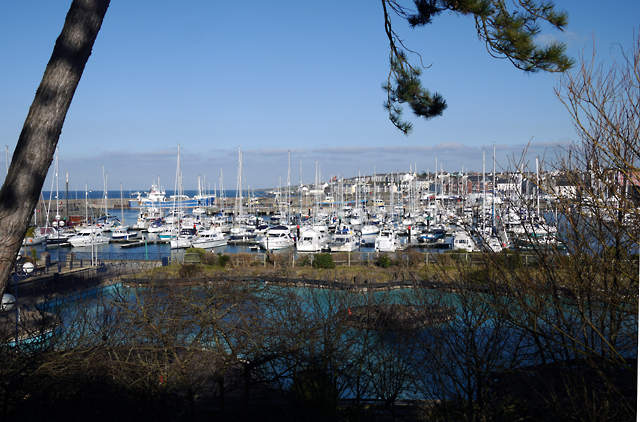
Bangor Marina as seen from a footpath above Pickie

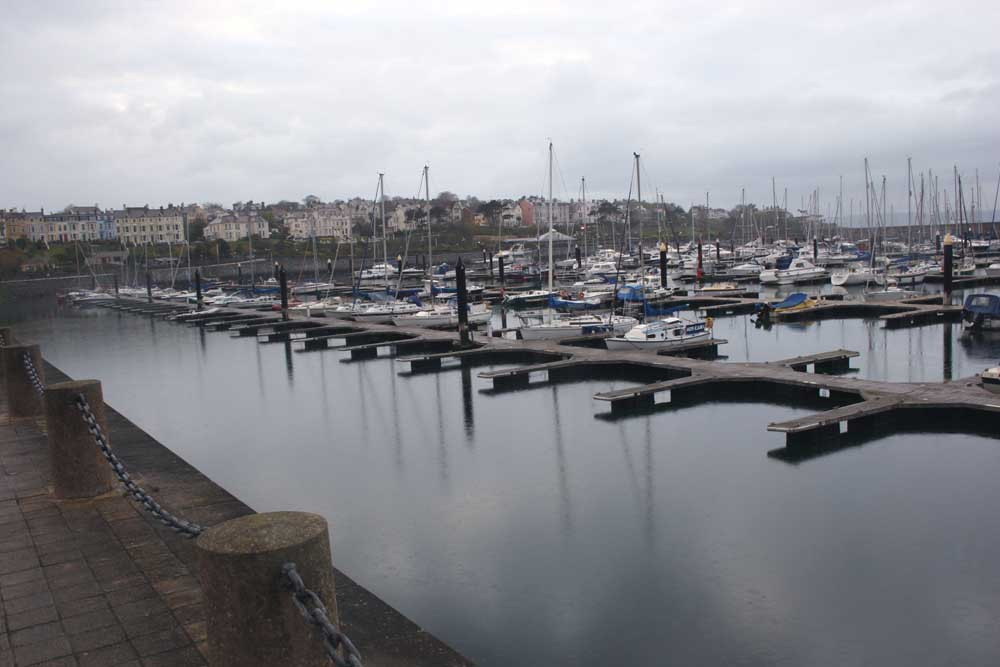
Bangor Marina on a cloudy day

Bangor Marina is the largest marina in Northern Ireland. It opened in 1989 on the southern shores of Belfast Lough, close to the Irish Sea cruising routes. The marina has become well known for providing a berth in the centre of Bangor. It has also been awarded Five Anchors by the Yachting Harbour Association.

Also based at the Marina are the Marine Court Hotel, HM Coast Guard's Marine Rescue Sub Centre and the Royal National Lifeboat Institution's Atlantic 85-class lifeboat Jessie Hillyard.

== Gallery ==
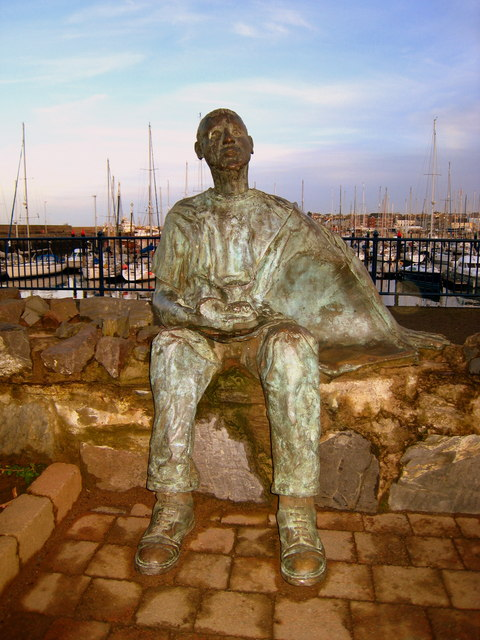
The pastie Supper, sculpture of a man eating a pastie is sited at Bangor Marina.

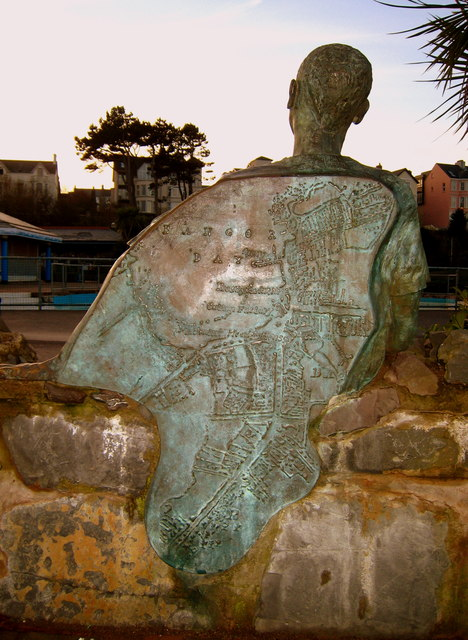
The pastie Supper reverse of the sculpture shows an old map of Bangor
