= Kilcooley estate =

Housing estate in Northern Ireland

Coordinates: 54.654173°N 5.707998°W

Kilcooley estate (From Irish: Cill Chúile) is a housing estate owned by the Northern Ireland Housing Executive on the outskirts of Bangor, Northern Ireland. The residents of the area are predominantly Protestant, and the area has strong links with loyalism.

== History ==
The name Kilcooley is derived from the Irish name Cill Chúile. Kilcooley Estate was built from the 1960s to the 1980s. Much of the estate was built between 1967 and 1976 to re-house people displaced from inner city areas of Belfast. There is a significant loyalist paramilitary presence in the estate and there has been incidents of public disorder most notably in 2007 when the Ulster Defence Association (UDA) was blamed for instigating riots. Kilcooley estate is situated approximately three miles west of Bangor city centre and is bounded by two major roads, the West Circular Road on the East and the Belfast Road on the West. Kilcooley is the third largest housing estate in Northern Ireland.

However, attempts have been made to improve the public image of the estate and various community forums have been created to implement this. In July 2007 Kilcooley Community Forum received £113,000 and Kilcooley Women's Centre received £115,000 in funding from the Department for Social Development. On 2 June 2017, Queen Elizabeth announced in the London Gazette that she had awarded Kilcooley Women's Centre the 'Queens Award for Voluntary Service' in recognition of the service to the community from 1995. In 2020 the centre celebrated its 25th anniversary of supporting women, children and families in the Borough of Ards North Down.

== Gallery ==
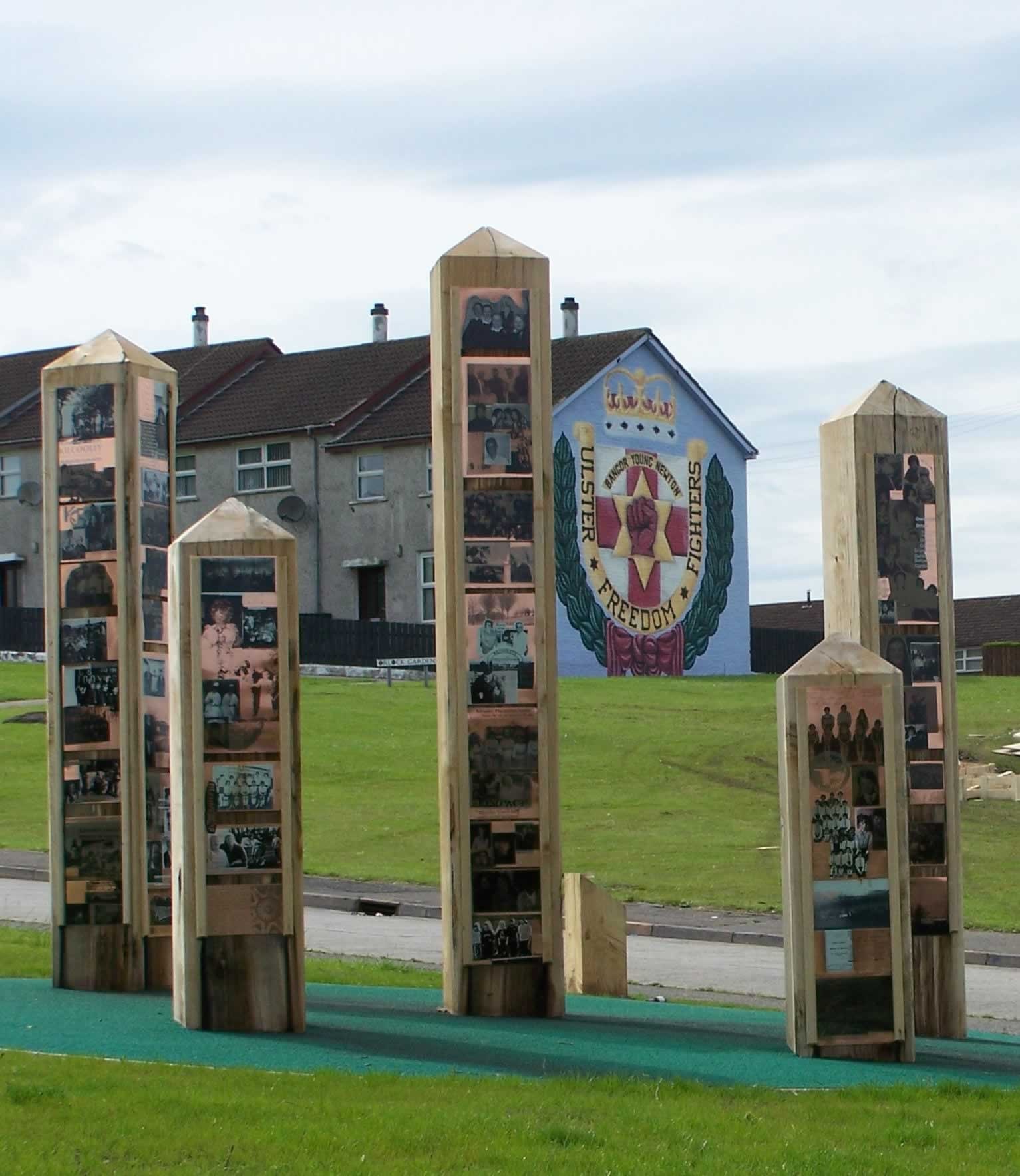
Local mural
