= Bangor Academy and Sixth Form College =

Location
- 2 Castle Park Road; Bangor, County Down, BT20 4TB; Northern Ireland; 54.665°N 5.660°W

Information
- Other name: Bangor Academy
- Type: Secondary
- Established: 2001
- Local authority: South Eastern Education and Library Board
- Specialist: Humanities
- Principal: Matthew Pitts
- Staff: 160
- Gender: Co-Educational
- Age range: 11–18
- Enrolment: 1871 (2024/25)
- Colours: Turquoise, Dark Navy, Gold, Red (Sixth Form)
- Accreditation: International School Award
- Website: www.bangoracademy.org.uk

Bangor Academy and Sixth Form College (informally Bangor Academy) is an 11–18 co-educational, secondary school and sixth form in Bangor, County Down, Northern Ireland. The school dates from 2001 when the non-selective Bangor Girls High School and the non-selective Gransha Boys' High school merged.

In a 2019 Belfast Telegraph survey of GCSE performance of every post-primary school that undertakes the examinations in Northern Ireland it ranked 156 out of 186. As of June 2025, the school is the largest in Northern Ireland with 1,871 pupils enrolled at the school.

== History ==
The school was formed as part of a merger between two secondary/intermediate schools: Bangor Girls High School and Gransha Boys' High School. The name for the newly formed school was Bangor Academy and Sixth Form College. A W J Hyndman was appointed to be the school's first principal.

The motto of Gransha Boys' High School was Conando Progredimur ("endeavour to be better"). The school was eventually bulldozed and cleared in 2008.

Northern Ireland's Department of Education announced on 1 March 2001 that a new school campus was to be built to accommodate 1,650 pupils with an investment package totalling £21 million.

The schools officially merged in 2001. It was decided to locate the Junior year groups, years 8, 9, and 10, at the Gransha Road campus; the Senior year groups, years 11, 12 and Sixth Form, were based at the Castle Street campus. All year groups moved into the new school building located on the Castle Park Road in 2008.

In March 2023, the school announced its plans to "transform" into an integrated school. The parent/guardian ballot took place between 6 May and 6 June 2023. Almost 80% of parents and guardians at Bangor Academy who voted supported the plans. The plans were rejected by Northern Ireland education minister Paul Givan.

The schools demographics, within the 2024/25 academic year, were 58% Protestant, 3% Roman Catholic and 39% other.

== School emblem ==
The Gryphon is the official emblem of the school which was adopted from the Gransha Boys' High school emblem. The old Gransha motto was dropped, however.

== Staff ==
Staffing comprises 91 teachers and 24 non-teaching staff. With the addition of supervisory, school meals, facilities management and cleaning staff the school employs 160 people. The pupil to teacher ratios for 2012–2013, calculated by the Department of Education for Northern Ireland, was 16:6.

== Status and awards ==
The school has been recognised for its work through awards including the status of Specialist School in Humanities by the Department of Education, the International School Award by the British Council and both the Northern Ireland and National Training Awards by the Department of Employment and Learning.

In 2011, it was recognised with the ICT Mark by Naace, the ICT Association, which confirmed the School's development work and achievement in ICT. This award was reconfirmed on the school in May 2014.

The school has been recognised by the Chinese Institute as a hub for their Confucius Classroom promotion.

In January 2014, it was awarded the 3rd Millennium Learning Award from Naace for promoting the role of technology in advancing education, .

Following April 2016, the students and staff had achieved a new Guinness World Record for the most persons doing sit-ups at the same time (827), overtaking the previous record of 503.

== Curriculum ==
The school offers Key Stage 3, GCSE and A level provision. It is part of both the North Down and Ards Learning Communities and is a member of the Bangor Learning Partnership. Through these relationships additional subjects become available to pupils and are provided depending on need.

There are curriculum links with the South Eastern Regional College (SERC) which is directly across the road from the school.

== Building ==
The school building was built following a Public Private Partnership scheme and opened in 2008. Prince Edward, Earl of Wessex officially opened the new building on 3 December 2009.

== Notable alumni ==
=== Gransha Boys' High ===
- Alex Easton, politician, MP and MLA; he said that it was "a hard school....I was badly bullied"
- George Hamilton, chief constable of PSNI (Police Service of Northern Ireland)

=== Bangor Academy ===
- Josh Magennis, footballer
