= Learning for life and work =

Northern Ireland school subject

Learning for life and work is a subject taught in secondary schools in Northern Ireland.

== Key Stage 3 ==
The curriculum at Key Stage 3 covers:

- employability,
- home economics,
- local and global citizenship
- personal development.

It is a compulsory subject but not a subject title. Schools are free to deliver the four strands in ways that suit their students.

== Key Stage 4 ==
There remains a statutory requirement to cover key topics:

- Employability
- Personal development
- Local and global citizenship

The school may decide how to deliver the content.

A GCSE is offered with the title Learning for life and work (2017) It is modular and work covers the following areas:

- Unit 1: Local and global citizenship (diversity and inclusion, government and politics, human rights)
- Unit 2: Personal development (physical health, mental health, sexual health, parenting, personal finance)
- Unit 3: Employability (globalisation, recruitment, employment rights, careers)
- Unit 4: Investigation (an in-depth study on a topic from Units 1-3)

There is an entry level certificate available too.Entry Level Learning for Life and Work (2015) It contains nine modules:

Local and Global Citizenship
- Unit 1: Learning to Live Together
- Unit 2: My Rights and Being Responsible
Personal Development
- Unit 3: Developing My Self-Management Skills
- Unit 4: Getting to Know Myself
- Unit 5: Travelling in My Community

Employability
- Unit 6: Workplace learning
- Unit 7: Applying for Jobs and Courses
- Unit 8: Planning My Business
- Unit 9: Making My Business Work.
