= Bildeston =

Village in Suffolk, England

Coordinates: 52°06′26″N 0°54′33″E

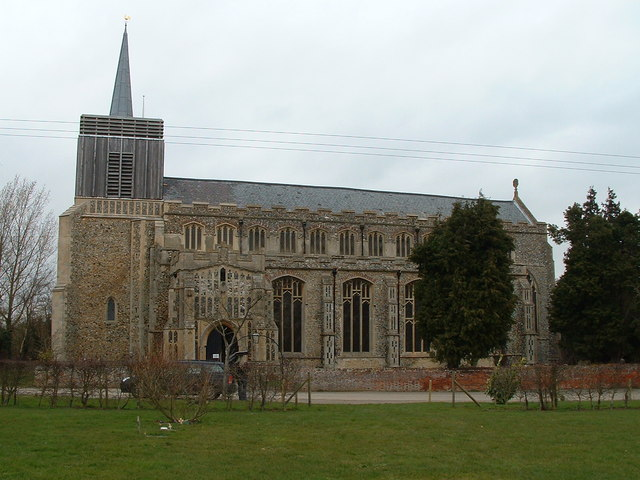
- St Mary's Church, Bildeston

- Location within Suffolk
- Area: 3.79 km^{2} (1.46 sq mi)
- Population: 1,054 (2011)
  - Density: 278/km^{2} (720/sq mi)
- District: Babergh
- Shire county: Suffolk
- Region: East
- Country: England
- Sovereign state: United Kingdom
- Post town: IPSWICH
- Postcode district: IP7

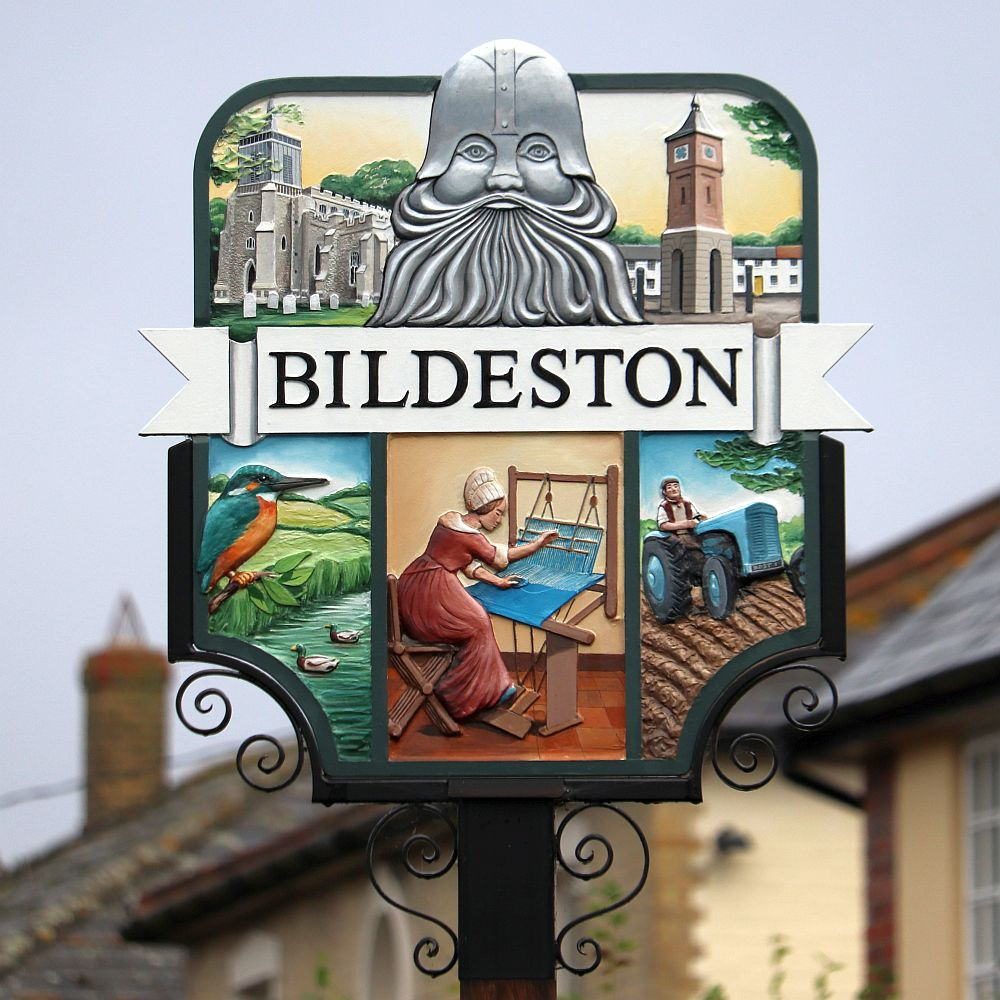
Bildeston new village sign

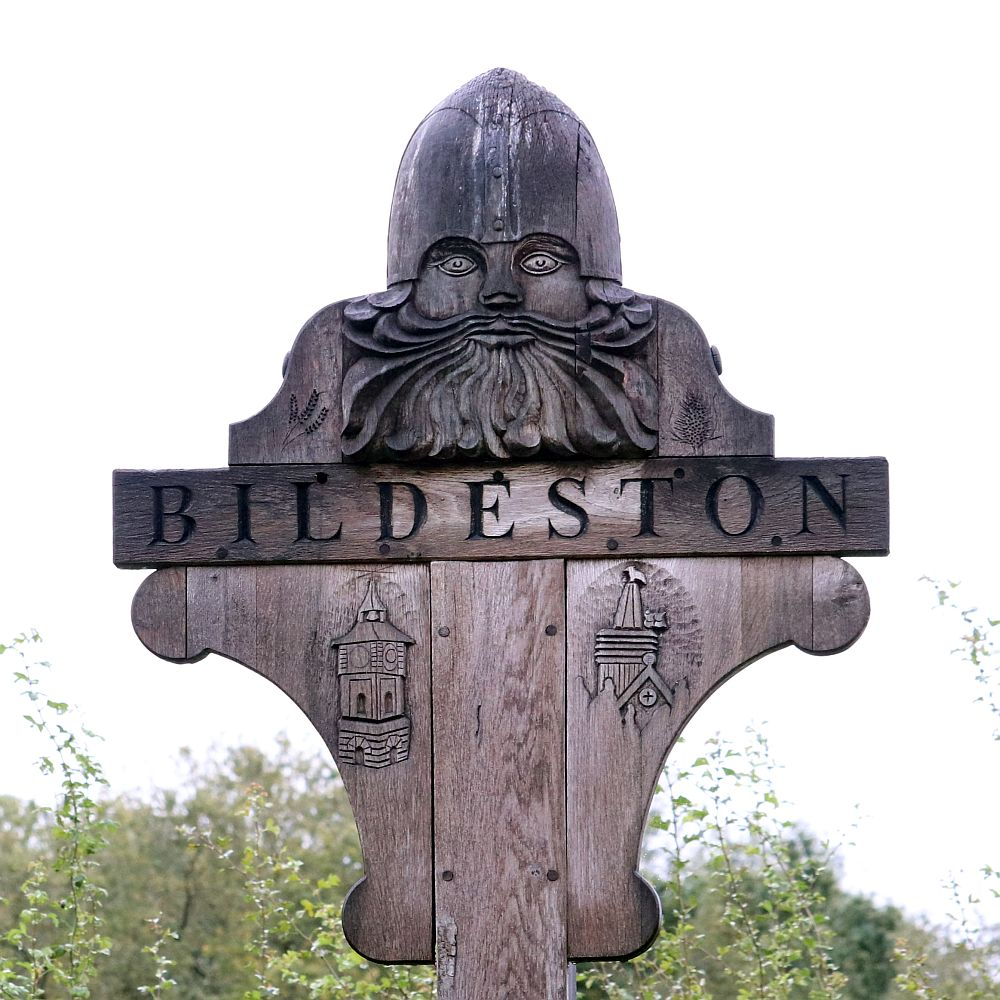
Bildeston old village sign

Bildeston is a village and civil parish in the Babergh district of Suffolk, England, around 5 miles (8 km) north of Hadleigh. In 2005 it had a population of 960. Population had increased to 1,054 at the 2011 Census.

== History ==
According to Eilert Ekwall the meaning of the village name is Bild's homestead.

According to Bildeston Church and Village by Sue Andrews, the village came into existence around 1,100 years ago. Although two Roman roads crossed here, little evidence has been found of any Roman settlement, only of Bildr, supposedly, seven centuries later, as an invading Danish leader, whose name the first settlement is thought to have adapted.

The first real evidence of Bildeston is in the Domesday Book. The manor had been a royal estate of Queen Edith, consort of Edward the Confessor. By 1086 there were 20 households, composed of villeins, bordars and serfs, all dependent on Walter the Deacon, the absentee Lord of the manor. Three plough teams belonged to the villagers, three to the lord and another to the priest, whose church was presumably where St Mary Magdalene's is today. One hundred years later the church was said to have been re-built by Lady Helewise de Gwerres, whose family, the Loveynes, later became the lords of the Manor.

Despite mythology explaining the move of the village down to the Brett valley as being caused by the Black Death of 1349, Matthew de Loveyne, then lord of the manor, was granted a charter for a market on the Stowmarket to Hadleigh Road in 1264. The move was to be more gradual and possibly more to do with easily accessible water. When the Revett family took over the manor in 1603 only the manor house and the church remained on the comparatively bleak hill, although houses on the road to the church were shown on early 19th century maps.

Bildeston became famous for blue broadcloth and buildings housing dyers, weavers, shearmen, spinners and clothiers were erected to form Chapel Street and Duke Street during the 15th and 16th centuries. Also constructed was a wool hall where the commerce of the wool trade was conducted. It is very similar to the one that can be seen restored to its original form as part of the Swan Hotel in nearby Lavenham. The Bildeston Hall still survives but is now split into two private residences on the corner of High Street and Ipswich Road. Early enclosure of agricultural land had created a landless population for enterprising landlords to profit by. But by the reign of Queen Mary (1553–58) scarcity and high prices lead to reports 'whereby this town of Bilstone hath decayed'.

Changes in fashion and foreign policy that interrupted trade meant the main employment became the supplying of yarn to Norwich instead of quality cloth to London. By 1674 two thirds of households were living in poverty and many were taken into the village workhouse. The Crown Inn became a centre for the casual hiring of farm labourers and domestic servants.

The weekly Wednesday market failed in 1764 and traveller John Kirby described Bildeston as 'a town in a bottom, meanly built and the streets are dirty'. The manor house was demolished, following the death of Bartholomew Beale the last lord of the manor 40 years before. The Cooke family of Polstead ostensibly took over the rents and the profits of the fair, but took little interest in the village. The last fair was held in 1872, with just one stall.

So called 'professional' people settled in the 19th century, there were plans to build a railway station on Dansford Meadow and the Riot Act was read during the 1885 elections. Bildeston, like so many other Suffolk villages, had survived a long period of decline, to again achieve relative affluence.

=== Bildeston Hall ===
Bildeston Hall, occasional home to lords who often had interests elsewhere, was to the south west of the church. Ploughing in 1974 removed remains of a circular moat and what may have been a fish pond, but did produce pottery from the 11th to 17th centuries. The crop marks, seen from the air, can still show the site of the original Bildeston.

== Clock tower ==
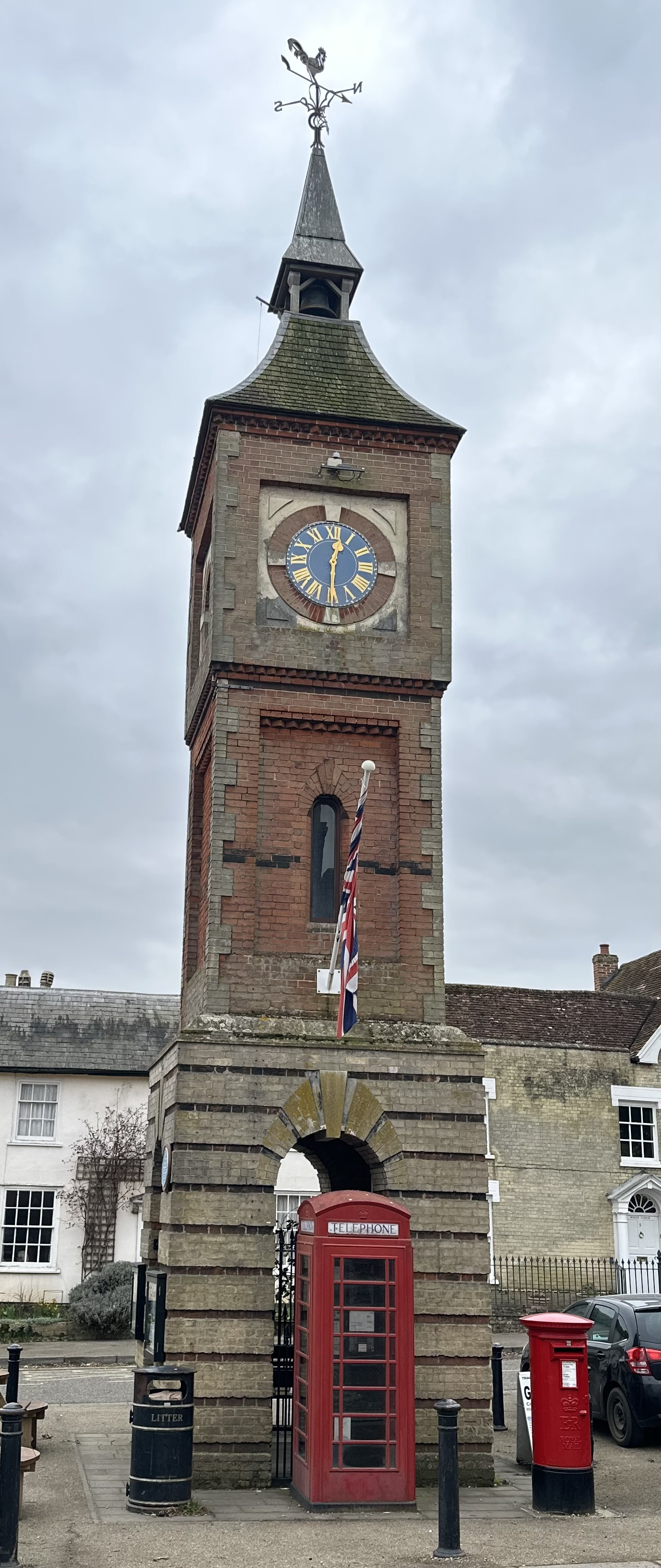
Clocktower Bildeston

In 1864, a clock tower was erected. It became grade II listed in 2010.

== Bildeston Village Signs ==
The Old Sign

The old sign was moved to a new location outside the church. The sign is a wood carving showing Bild(er)'s head at the top with the clock tower underneath on the left and the church tower on the right. The sign was originally erected in 2005.

The New Sign

The sign was unveiled on Saturday 9 July 2022 located on the corner of the High Street and Ipswich Road. The sign was donated by TMJ Interiors and Heathpatch. The village Sign People made the sign. Dan Jarvis constructed the plinth and erected the sign.

Themes on the New Sign

Bilder

A Danish Viking leader who arrived here in 878AD

Church

St Mary’s church built in the 14th century, but as we see it today with the rebuilt tower which collapsed in the 1970’s.

Countryside

The countryside around the village showing a farming scene with a farmer on quite an old tractor

Kings Pightle Nature Reserve

Country scene representing Kings Pightle Nature Reserve depicting a kingfisher and mallard ducks on the river

Clocktower

The clock tower in the Market Place built in 1864. The clock tower at Bildeston, seems to have been designed simply for the benefit of the community. Erected at a cost of £200, it was funded partly from the sale of a charity property, and partly by public subscription.

Weaver

The wool cloth industry which commenced in the year 1350

== Present day ==
Today, Bildeston has a post office, a general provisions shop, and three pubs. Two of pubs were converted into private houses 40 years ago.

There are around 80 listed buildings.

The King's Head, a Grade II listed freehouse dating from around 1530, organises an annual beer festival at the end of May. The other pubs in the village are a gastropub The Crown and The Red Lion. Previously known as The Lion, the Red Lion is a traditional pub with 16th century origins, although the present building is of the 18th century. The pub was situated in Wattisham until 1882 when changes to the parish boundary incorporated it into Bildeston Parish.

== St Mary Magdalene Church ==
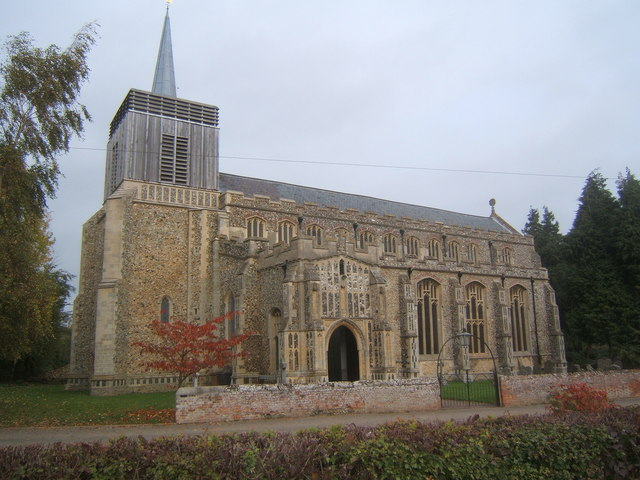
The church of St Mary Magdalene, Bildeston

St Mary Magdalene Church stands isolated, about half a mile from the village of Bildeston. On the morning of 8 May 1975 the church tower collapsed. The tower was undergoing a significant renovation at the time, and the medieval bells had already been removed. The replacement tower is topped by a bare, functional box, with a slender little spire on top. The south porch has grand flushwork, a testimony to 15th century piety and Marian devotion. The doorway must be among the best in the county of its period. The south aisle features a window by the Kempe workshop, depicting the Annunciation and richly adorned with subsidiary scenes.

On 23 January 1958, the church was designated as a Grade I listed building, the highest ranking and one denoting a building of exceptional interest.

== Notable people ==
- Richard Wilson (1759–1834), Member of Parliament (MP) for Ipswich, from 1806 to 1807.
- Frederic Growse (1836–1893), British civil servant of the Indian Civil Service (ICS), Hindi scholar, archaeologist and collector, was born in Bildeston.
- The Kray Twins, like many other Eastenders, were evacuated to nearby Hadleigh in WW2. They came to love the area and subsequently bought a home in Bildeston, as well as another for their parents.
