= South Eastern Regional College =

Further and higher education college in Northern Ireland

- Other name: SERC
- Motto: Inspiring, Transforming, Enriching
- Type: Further & Higher Education College
- Established: August 2007; 19 years ago (predecessor Institutes date back to 1910)
- Principal: Tommy Martin
- Director: Heather McKee; Gary Ritchie
- Total staff: 776 FTE ^{a}
- Students: 13,091 ^{a}
- Location: Northern Ireland
- Campus: Bangor, Downpatrick, Lisburn, Newtownards
- Website: www.serc.ac.uk
- ^{a} 2023/24 Academic Year

South Eastern Regional College (SERC) is a further and higher education college in the south-east of Northern Ireland.

SERC was created following the merger of three institutes of further and higher education in the south-east of Northern Ireland. These were East Down Institute, Lisburn Institute and North Down and Ards Institute. The merger took effect from August 2007.

The college was inspected in 2009 by the Education and Training Inspectorate, with the finding that "the quality of education and training provided by the South Eastern Regional College is good".

== Campuses ==
The college's main campuses are situated in:

- Ballynahinch
- Bangor
- Downpatrick
- Lisburn (Institute established 1910)
- Newtownards

In addition to these main campuses, smaller campuses are also located in Newcastle, Ballynahinch and Holywood with multiple out-centers throughout the province.

Some SERC campuses have hair and beauty salons and restaurants that are open to the public.

== Courses ==
The college offers full-time and part-time' courses and has over 13,000 students and over 800 members of staff. Courses are available in a range of subjects at a further education or higher education level. There are also many part-time leisure courses which run in the evening, for example Holiday Spanish, Tai Chi, Painting For Pleasure or Baking Breads.

SERC also runs Apprenticeships and Higher Level Apprenticeships.
