= 1929 in the United Kingdom =

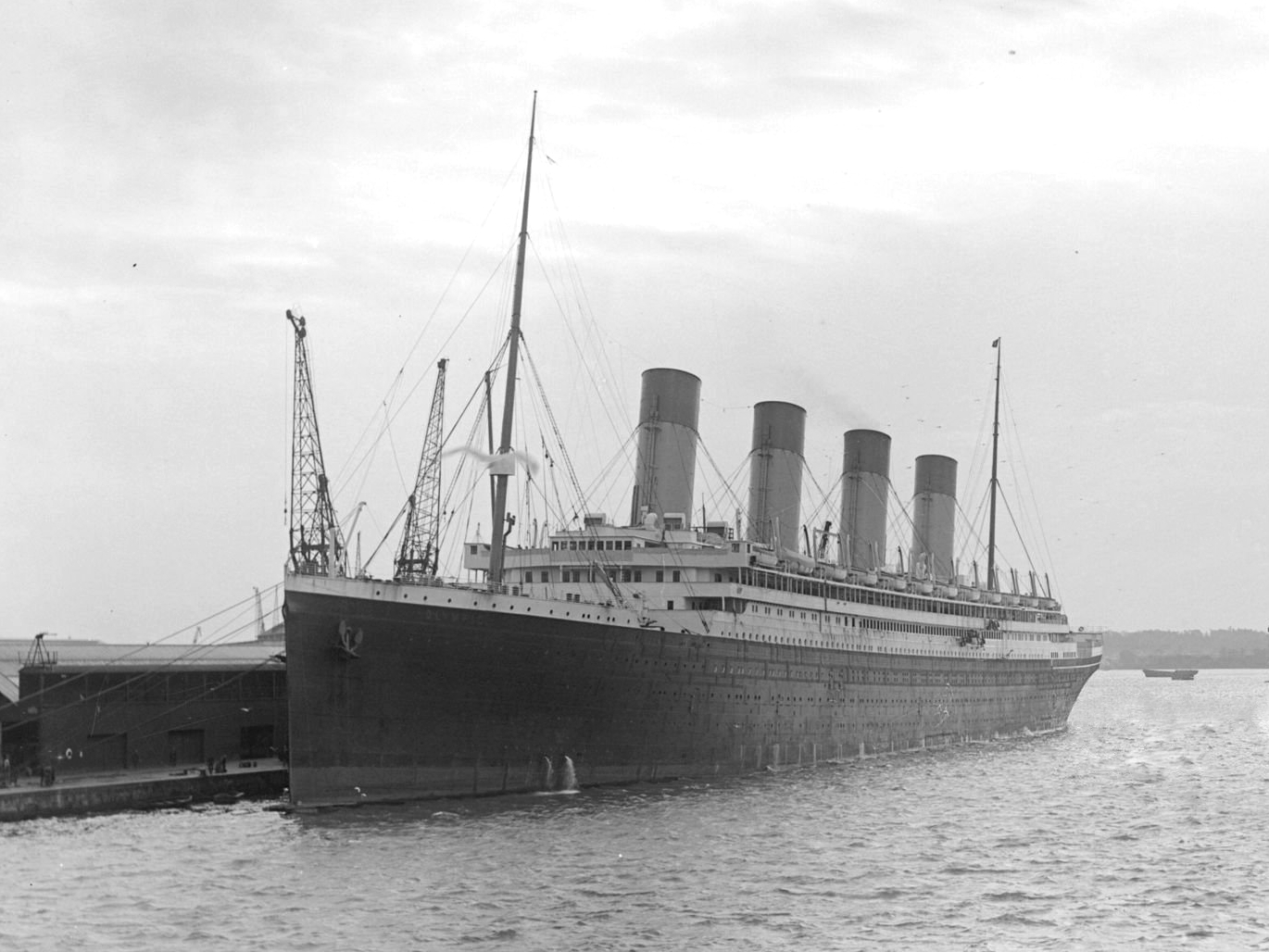
RMS Olympic at Southampton in 1929

Events from the year 1929 in the United Kingdom. This year sees the start of the Great Depression.

== Incumbents ==
- Monarch – George V
- Prime Minister
  - Stanley Baldwin (Conservative) (until 5 June)
  - Ramsay MacDonald (Labour) (starting 5 June)

== Events ==
- 23 January – The Lancashire Cotton Corporation is set up by the Bank of England to rescue the Lancashire cotton milling (spinning) industry by means of horizontal integration.
- 18 March – An underground fire at Coombs Wood colliery near Halesowen kills 8 miners, the last major disaster in the Black Country coalfield.
- 30 March – Imperial Airways begins operating the first commercial flights between London and Karachi.
- 22 April – Chat Moss airport opens in Manchester, Britain's first municipal airport.
- 10 May
  - Age of Marriage Act 1929 passed, raising the legal marriageable age to sixteen years for both parties to a marriage.
  - Yorkshire cricketer Wilfred Rhodes takes his 4000th first-class wicket during a match against Oxford University.
- 14 May – The North East Coast Exhibition opens, and would run for six months.
- 31 May – The general election returns a hung parliament, with Labour as the largest party. Liberals will determine who has power. Amongst the Conservative casualties is future Prime Minister Harold Macmillan, the 35-year-old MP for Stockton-on-Tees, who first entered parliament five years earlier. This is the first UK general election in which women have an equal franchise with men and they form a majority of the electorate.
- 7 June
  - The Conservatives concede power rather than risk courting Liberals for a fragile majority.
  - Ross County F.C. founded in Dingwall, Scotland. They initially play in the Highland League.
- 8 June – Ramsay MacDonald forms a new Labour government. Margaret Bondfield becomes the first female member of the Cabinet when she is named Minister of Labour.
- 17 June – Alfred Hitchcock's Blackmail shown for the first time in London, the first British sound film.
- 1 July – C. P. Scott retires after 57 and a half years as editor of The Manchester Guardian and is succeeded by his son, Ted Scott.
- 5 July – Scotland Yard seizes thirteen paintings of male and female nudes by D. H. Lawrence from a Mayfair gallery on grounds of indecency under the Vagrancy Act 1838.
- 11 July – Gillingham Fair fire disaster kills nine boys and six men as a firefighting demonstration goes catastrophically wrong in Kent.
- July – The last insurance company fire brigade, that of Norwich Union in Worcester, is stood down (last fire attended 25 February at Peopleton).
- 4 August – Bekonscot opens to the public in Buckinghamshire, the world's oldest original miniature park.
- 20 August – First transmissions of John Logie Baird's experimental 30-line television system by the BBC in London.
- 2 October – The union between the Church of Scotland and the United Free Church of Scotland takes place.
- 28 October – Sharp fall on the London Stock Exchange, following a similar crash on Wall Street on 24 October.
- 1 November
  - The Pony Club established.
  - Release in the United States of the historical film Disraeli. George Arliss plays the title rôle, for which he will be awarded the Academy Award for Best Actor, the first British winner.
- 10 November – Première of John Grierson's documentary film Drifters about North Sea herring fishermen, made for the Empire Marketing Board, effectively inaugurating the British Documentary Film Movement. (It debuts at the private Film Society in London on a double-bill with the UK première of Eisenstein's The Battleship Potemkin.)
- 1 December – Underground Electric Railways Company of London officially opens its new headquarters building at 55 Broadway designed by Charles Holden and incorporating sculptures by Jacob Epstein, Eric Gill and Henry Moore.
- 10 December
  - Arthur Harden wins the Nobel Prize in Chemistry jointly with Hans von Euler-Chelpin "for their investigations on the fermentation of sugar and fermentative enzymes".
  - Frederick Hopkins wins the Nobel Prize in Physiology or Medicine "for his discovery of the growth-stimulating vitamins".
- 15 December – Beatification of the One Hundred and Seven Martyrs of England and Wales by Pope Pius XI.
- 31 December – Glen Cinema disaster in Paisley, Scotland: 69 children die trying to escape smoke.

=== Undated ===
- First Tesco store opens, at Burnt Oak, Edgware, Middlesex.
- Coypu introduced to East Anglia for their fur.

== Publications ==
- Agatha Christie's novel The Seven Dials Mystery.
- Robert Graves' memoir Good-Bye to All That.
- Patrick Hamilton's play Rope.
- Richard Hughes' novel A High Wind in Jamaica.
- Charles Kay Ogden's book Basic English.
- J. B. Priestley's novel The Good Companions.
- Alison Uttley's children's book The Squirrel, The Hare and the Little Grey Rabbit, introducing Little Grey Rabbit.
- Virginia Woolf's essay A Room of One's Own.

== Births ==
- 10 January – Tony Soper, naturalist, author and broadcaster (died 2024)
- 12 January – Alasdair MacIntyre, Scottish philosopher (died 2025)
- 14 January – Peter Barkworth, actor (died 2006)
- 15 January – Ronnie Allen, footballer (died 2001)
- 21 January – John Hayes, art historian (died 2005)
- 23 January
  - George Ffitch, journalist and broadcaster (died 2001)
  - Ian Thomson, cricketer (died 2021)
- 28 January – Acker Bilk, jazz clarinetist and band leader (died 2014)
- 30 January – Richard Long, 4th Viscount Long, politician (died 2017)
- 31 January – Jean Simmons, actress (died 2010)
- 4 February – Mary Coombs, computer programmer (died 2022)
- 6 February – Keith Waterhouse, novelist and journalist (died 2009)
- 15 February – Graham Hill, racing driver (died 1975)
- 17 February
  - Nicholas Ridley, Baron Ridley of Liddesdale, English politician, Secretary of State for Business, Innovation and Skills (died 1993)
  - Patricia Routledge, actress (died 2025)
- 18 February – Len Deighton, thriller writer (died 2026)
- 21 February – James Beck, actor (died 1973)
- 5 March – David Sheppard, cricketer and Bishop of Liverpool (died 2005)
- 13 March
  - Keith Schellenberg, Olympic sportsman, businessman and laird (died 2019)
  - Jim Slater, investor (died 2015)
- 21 March – John Oaksey, horse racing jockey and journalist (died 2012)
- 23 March – Sir Roger Bannister, middle-distance runner (died 2018)
- 24 March – Francis Essex, television producer (died 2009)
- 1 April – Barbara Bryne, actress (died 2023)
- 5 April
  - Nigel Hawthorne, actor (died 2001)
  - Joe Meek, record producer (died 1967)
- 6 April – Edmund Percey, architect (died 2014)
- 10 April – Mike Hawthorn, racing driver (died 1959)
- 11 April – John Brownjohn, literary translator (died 2020)
- 13 April – Ronald Eyre, theatre and television director (died 1992)
- 14 April – Gerry Anderson, puppeteer, television producer and director (died 2012)
- 15 April – Adrian Cadbury, businessman (died 2015)
- 17 April
  - John Erickson, historian (died 2002)
  - John Raymond Hobbs, pathologist (died 2008)
- 18 April
  - Peter Jeffrey, actor (died 1999)
  - Eddie Stobart, businessman (died 2024)
- 19 April – Lady Pamela Hicks, socialite, cousin of Prince Philip, Duke of Edinburgh (died 2026)
- 21 April – Barbara Keogh, actress (died 2005)
- 22 April
  - Michael Atiyah, mathematician (died 2019)
  - John Nicks, figure skater and skating coach
- 29 April – Jeremy Thorpe, Liberal leader (died 2014)
- 4 May – Audrey Hepburn, Belgian-born actress (died 1993)
- 6 May – Rosemary Cramp, archaeologist (died 2023)
- 8 May – Tristan Jones, sailor and writer (died 1995)
- 9 May – Tony Lloyd, Baron Lloyd of Berwick, lawyer and judge (died 2024)
- 10 May – Thomas McGhee, footballer (died 2018)
- 12 May – Don Gibson, footballer (died 2024)
- 14 May – Henry McGee, actor (died 2006)
- 15 May – Andrew Bertie, Grand Master of the Sovereign Military Order of Malta (died 2008)
- 18 May
  - William Kerr Fraser, civil servant (died 2018)
  - Adrian Morris, artist (died 2004)
  - Norman St John-Stevas, politician (died 2012)
- 19 May
  - David Jacobs, broadcaster (died 2013)
  - Jack Walker, industrialist (died 2000)
  - Johnny Wright, boxer (died 2001)
- 21 May – Robert Welch, designer (died 2000)
- 23 May – Peter Wells, athlete (died 2018)
- 26 May – John Jackson, lawyer and businessman
- 29 May – Peter Higgs, theoretical physicist, winner of Nobel Prize in Physics (died 2024)
- 1 June – Giles Constable, historian (died 2021)
- 5 June – Denis Coe, soldier, educator and politician (died 2015)
- 8 June – Robert Shirley, 13th Earl Ferrers, politician (died 2012)
- 10 June – Thomas Taylor, Baron Taylor of Blackburn, Labour Party politician (died 2016)
- 12 June – Brigid Brophy, author (died 1995)
- 13 June – Alan Civil, horn player (died 1989)
- 20 June – Anne Weale, romantic novelist (died 2007)
- 22 June – Bruce Kent, peace campaigner, previously Catholic priest (died 2022)
- 23 June
  - Peter Dunn, paediatrician (died 2021)
  - Dave King, actor and comedian (died 2002)
- 26 June – Rodney Nuckey, racing driver (died 2000)
- 30 June
  - Ron Phoenix, English footballer (died 2021)
  - Ivor Seemley, English professional footballer (died 2014)
- 5 July – Tony Lock, cricketer (died 1995)
- 6 July – Jack Edwards, Welsh footballer and manager (died 2014)
- 7 July – Colin Walker, footballer (died 2017)
- 8 July – A. T. Q. Stewart, Northern Irish historian and academic (died 2010)
- 9 July
  - Christopher Morahan, stage, television director and production executive (died 2017)
  - Derek Ratcliffe, conservationist (died 2005)
- 10 July – Winnie Ewing, Scottish nationalist politician (died 2023)
- 12 July – Brian Woodward, footballer (died 2014)
- 15 July
  - Rhoda Bulter, Scottish poet (died 1994)
  - Larry Lamb, newspaper editor (died 2000)
- 17 July – Kenneth Grange, industrial designer (died 2024)
- 20 July – Irving Wardle, writer and theatre critic (died 2023)
- 21 July – John Woodvine, stage and screen actor (died 2025)
- 22 July – U. A. Fanthorpe, poet (died 2009)
- 24 July
  - Lady Rosemary Spencer-Churchill, aristocrat
  - Peter Yates, film director (died 2011)
- 25 July – Bryan Pearce, artist (died 2007)
- 27 July – Jack Higgins, born Harry Patterson, thriller writer (died 2022)
- 30 July – Donald Hamilton Fraser, artist (died 2009)
- 31 July
  - Lynne Reid Banks, author (died 2024)
  - Johnny Carlyle, ice hockey player and coach (died 2017)
- 2 August – David Waddington, Baron Waddington, politician (died 2017)
- 5 August – Al Alvarez, poet and critic (died 2019)
- 8 August – Ronald Biggs, criminal (died 2013)
- 11 August – Alun Hoddinott, Welsh composer (died 2008)
- 12 August – Jean Miller, actress and painter (died 2014)
- 23 August – Pete King, saxophonist (died 2009)
- 25 August – Clifford Forsythe, politician (died 2000)
- 28 August – John Evans, footballer (died 2004)
- 29 August
  - Thom Gunn, poet (died 2004)
  - Susan Shaw, actress (died 1978)
- 30 August – Ian McNaught-Davis, television presenter (died 2014)
- 2 September – Victor Spinetti, actor (died 2012)
- 4 September – Robin Hunter, actor (died 2004)
- 8 September – Roger Byrne, footballer (died 1958)
- 15 September – John Julius Norwich, historian (died 2018)
- 17 September – Stirling Moss, racing driver (died 2020)
- 18 September
  - Richard Grimsdale, electrical engineer (died 2005)
  - Elizabeth Spriggs, actress (died 2008)
- 19 September
  - Timothy Colman, businessman (died 2021)
  - Charles Gordon-Lennox, 10th Duke of Richmond (died 2017)
- 21 September – Bernard Williams, philosopher (died 2003)
- 23 September – James Carnegie, 3rd Duke of Fife, peer (died 2018)
- 25 September – Ronnie Barker, comic actor (died 2005)
- 28 September – Gordon Reece, journalist and political strategist (died 2001)
- 2 October – Robin Hardy, film director and author (died 2016)
- 6 October – George Carman, lawyer (died 2001)
- 7 October
  - Tony Beckley, character actor (died 1980)
  - Robert Westall, author (died 1993)
- 8 October – Betty Boothroyd, Speaker of the House of Commons (died 2023)
- 11 October – Vivian Matalon, theatre director (died 2018)
- 16 October
  - Jane Griffiths, actress (died 1975)
  - Ray Jessel, Welsh songwriter, screenwriter, orchestrator and musical theatre composer (died 2015)
  - Mary Parry, figure skater (died 2017)
- 20 October – Colin Jeavons, actor
- 24 October – Clifford Rose, actor (died 2021)
- 25 October – Robin Parkinson, actor (died 2022)
- 28 October
  - Jack Hedley, character actor (died 2021)
  - Joan Plowright, actress (died 2025)
- 30 October
  - Jean Chapman, romantic novelist
  - Bill Shelton, politician (died 2003)
- 4 November – Dickie Valentine, singer and actor (died 1971)
- 7 November
  - Peter Evans, musicologist (died 2018)
  - Lila Kaye, actress (d. 2012)
- 9 November – Eric Thompson, actor (died 1982)
- 12 November – Peter Lamont, art director and production designer (died 2020)
- 13 November – Theo Aronson, royal biographer (died 2003)
- 20 November – Penelope Hobhouse, garden writer and designer
- 23 November – Maurice Flitcroft, golfer (died 2007)
- 27 November
  - David Nickson, Baron Nickson businessman and crossbench peer
  - Alan Simpson, comedy scriptwriter (died 2017)
- 29 November – Derek Jameson, journalist and broadcaster (died 2012)
- 8 December – Ali Bongo, magician (died 2009)
- 9 December – Reay Tannahill, writer (died 2007)
- 11 December – Kenneth MacMillan, ballet dancer and choreographer (died 1992)
- 12 December – John Osborne, playwright and film producer (died 1994)
- 16 December
  - Nicholas Courtney, actor (died 2011)
  - Bernard Crick, political theorist (died 2008)
  - James Moore, author (died 2017)
- 17 December – Jacqueline Hill, actress (died 1993)
- 23 December – Hugh Millais, actor and author (died 2009)
- 24 December – Tim Brinton, politician (died 2009)
- 25 December – Stuart Hall, presenter
- 28 December – Brian Redhead, journalist and broadcaster (died 1994)
- 31 December – Peter May, England cricketer (died 1994)

== Deaths ==
- 15 January – Sir William Boyd Dawkins, geologist (born 1837)
- 24 January – Wilfred Baddeley, tennis player (born 1872)
- 6 February – Charlotte Carmichael Stopes, Scottish writer and women's rights activist (born 1840)
- 12 February – Lillie Langtry, British singer and actress (born 1853)
- 14 February – Sydney Carline, painter, war artist (born 1888)
- 2 March – Sir Edward Seymour, admiral (born 1840)
- 12 April – Flora Annie Steel, writer (born 1847)
- 21 April – Lucy Clifford, novelist, dramatist and screenwriter (born 1846)
- 9 May – Kate Perugini, née Dickens, painter (born 1839)
- 21 May – Archibald Primrose, 5th Earl of Rosebery, Prime Minister of the United Kingdom (born 1847)
- 5 June – Sir Cecil Burney, admiral (born 1858)
- 16 June – Bramwell Booth, General of The Salvation Army (born 1856)
- 21 June – Leonard Hobhouse, political theorist and sociologist (born 1864)
- 24 June – Queenie Newall, archer (born 1854)
- 28 June – Edward Carpenter, English poet (born 1844)
- 5 August – Dame Millicent Fawcett, British suffragist and feminist (born 1847)
- 13 August – Sir Ray Lankester, zoologist (born 1847)
- 14 August – Henry Horne, 1st Baron Horne, general (born 1861)
- 26 August – Sir Ernest Satow, British diplomat and scholar (born 1843)
- 7 September – Frederic Weatherly, English lyricist (born 1848)
- 19 September – Francis Darwin, botanist and academic (born 1848)
- 27 September – Johnny Hill, flyweight boxer (born 1905)
- 29 October – Emily Robin, brothel owner, in road accident (born 1874)
- 30 October – Gertrude Keightley, English-born Northern Ireland local government and charity official (born c. 1864)
- 14 December – Sir Henry Jackson, admiral (born 1855)
- 17 December – Arthur G. Jones-Williams, aviator (born 1898)

== See also ==
- List of British films of 1929
