= 1929 in association football =

The following are the football (soccer) events of the year 1929 throughout the world.

== Events ==
- Formation of the Football Association of Zambia in 1929.

== Winners club national championship ==
- Argentina: Club de Gimnasia y Esgrima La Plata
- Austria: Rapid Wien
- Belgium: Royal Antwerp
- Czechoslovakia: Slavia Prague
- Denmark: B93
- England: Sheffield Wednesday
- France: Olympique Marseille
- Germany: SpVgg Fürth
- Greece: not held due to financial reasons
- Hungary: MTK Hungaria
- Iceland: KR
- Ireland: Shelbourne
- Italy: Bologna
- Luxembourg: Spora Luxembourg
- Netherlands: PSV Eindhoven
- Paraguay: Olimpia Asunción
- Poland: Warta Poznan
- Romania: Venus București
- Scotland:
  - Division One: Rangers
  - Scottish Cup: Kilmarnock
- Spain: F.C. Barcelona
- Sweden: Hälsingborgs IF (not awarded)
- Switzerland: Young Boys

== International tournaments ==
- 1929 British Home Championship (October 22, 1928 – April 13, 1929)

Scotland

- Baltic Cup 1929 in Latvia (August 14–16, 1929)

Estonia

- 1929-32 Nordic Football Championship (June 14, 1929 – September 25, 1932)
  1929: (June 14 - October 13, 1929)

Norway (1929)
Norway (1929-1932)

- South American Championship 1929 in Argentina (November 1, 1929 – November 17, 1929)

Argentina

== Births ==
- January 5: Aulis Rytkönen, Finnish international footballer (died 2014)
- January 7: Manfred Kaiser, East German international footballer (died 2017)
- February 3: Néstor Carballo, Uruguayan international footballer (died 1981)
- February 3: Büyük Jeddikar, Iranian international footballer (died 2013)
- February 6: Ramón Martínez Pérez, Spanish footballer (died 2017)
- February 28: Yevgeny Goryansky, Russian football striker and coach (died 1999)
- April 17: Karl-Erik Palmér, Swedish international footballer (died 2015)
- April 18 – Ion Voinescu, Romanian footballer (died 2018)
- April 19:
  - Jiří Hledík, Czech international footballer (died 2015)
  - Dennis Pell, English professional footballer (died 2003)
- May 12: Don Gibson, English club footballer
- May 18: Herbert Schoen, East German international footballer (died 2014)
- May 19: Frank Lynn, English professional footballer (died 2011)
- June 23: Bart Carlier, Dutch football player (died 2017)
- July 1: Parviz Koozehkanani, Iranian footballer (died 2025)
- July 7: Colin Walker, English footballer (died 2017)
- July 13: Luciano Panetti, Italian footballer (died 2016)
- July 18:
  - Enore Boscolo, Italian footballer (died 2023)
  - Roy Killin, Canadian soccer player (Manchester United)
- July 21: José Santamaría, Spanish-Uruguayan international footballer
- August 13: Vivien Felton, English football (died 2005)
- October 10: David Proctor, Northern Irish former footballer (died 2011)
- October 22: Lev Yashin, Soviet international footballer (died 1990)
- November 3: Kevin Wood, English professional footballer (died 2012)
- November 12: Ríkharður Jónsson, Icelandic international footballer (died 2017)
- November 25: Marcel De Corte, Belgian footballer (died 2017)
- November 30: Doğan Babacan, Turkish football referee (died 2018)
- December 9: Luis Cid, Spanish football coach, manager (died 2018)
- December 17: Eliseo Prado, Argentine international footballer (died 2016)
