= 1929 in British music =

This is a summary of 1929 in music in the United Kingdom.

== Events ==
- 22 January – Gordon Jacob's First String Quartet is premiered by the Spencer Dyke Quartet in London.
- 13 June – Eugene Goossens conducts the UK premiere of Ottorino Respighi's Feste Romane, at the Queen's Hall, London.
- 27 June – First London performances of two ballets by Igor Stravinsky, Apollon musagète and Le baiser de la fée, conducted by the composer at the Kingsway Hall and broadcast on the wireless.
- 4 October – Beethoven’s complete Ninth Symphony (with full chorus) is performed at the Proms for the first time since 1902. It has become a regular annual fixture of the festival ever since.
- 12 October – Sir Thomas Beecham, supported by Peter Warlock, launches a six-day festival of the work of Frederick Delius, at the Queen's Hall in London. The composer attends in his wheelchair.
- October – George Formby has a recording session with Dominion Records.
- date unknown
  - Jimmy Campbell and Reg Connelly form their music publishing company as a result of the success of their song "Show Me the Way to Go Home".
  - Ray Noble becomes leader of the New Mayfair Dance Orchestra, an His Master's Voice studio band featuring members of many of the top hotel orchestras of the day.
  - Will Fyffe participates in a screen test, shot for Pathe in New York; it provides rare screen footage of his music hall act.

== Popular music ==
- "Dear Little Cafe" w.m. Noël Coward
- "I Lift Up My Finger (and I Say "Tweet Tweet")" w.m. Leslie Sarony
- "Spread a Little Happiness" w.m. Vivian Ellis, recorded by Binnie Hale

== Classical music: new works ==
- Kenneth J. Alford
  - Old Panama
  - HM Jollies
- Arnold Bax – Symphony No. 3
- Benjamin Britten – Rhapsody for String Quartet
- Alan Bush – Dialectic Op. 15 for string quartet
- Frederick Delius – Cynara
- David John de Lloyd – Forty Welsh Traditional Tunes (arrangements)
- John Ireland – Ballad
- William Walton – Viola Concerto

== Opera ==
- Ralph Vaughan Williams – Sir John in Love

== Musical theatre ==
- 12 July – Bitter Sweet, by Noël Coward, opens at His Majesty's Theatre.

== Musical films ==
- Auld Lang Syne, starring Sir Harry Lauder and Dorothy Boyd (silent film with soundtrack added later)
- The Broken Melody, starring Enid Stamp Taylor (silent film with soundtrack added later)

== Births ==
- 5 January – Norman Kay, composer (died 2001)
- 28 January – Acker Bilk, jazz clarinetist and band leader (died 2014)
- 14 February – Wyn Morris, conductor (died 2010)
- 25 February – Sandy Brown, Scottish clarinetist (died 1975)
- 5 April – Joe Meek, record producer (died 1967)
- 6 April – Edmund Percey, architect and jazz pianist (died 2014)
- 11 May – Stan Kane, Scottish-Canadian actor and singer (died 2015)
- 13 June – Alan Civil, horn player (died 1989)
- 9 July – Alex Welsh, Scottish singer, cornetist, and trumpeter (died 1982)
- 2 August – Roy Crimmins, trombonist and composer (died 2014)
- 5 August – John Armatage, drummer and arranger
- 11 August – Alun Hoddinott, composer (died 2008)
- 20 September – Joe Temperley, jazz saxophonist (died 2016)
- 2 October – Kenneth Leighton, pianist and composer (died 1988)
- 4 November – Dickie Valentine, singer (died 1971)
- 11 December – Kenneth MacMillan, ballet dancer and choreographer (died 1992)
- date unknown – Maurice Handford, horn player (died 1986)

== Deaths ==
- 12 February – Lillie Langtry, singer and actress, 75
- 22 August – Lucy Broadwood, folk song collector and researcher, 71
- 7 September – Frederic Weatherly, songwriter, 80
- 29 December – Josiah Booth, hymn-writer, 77

== See also ==
- 1929 in British television
- 1929 in the United Kingdom
- List of British films of 1929
