= 1928–29 Football League =

37th season of the Football League

The Football League
- Season: 1928–29
- Champions: The Wednesday
- Relegated: Ashington
- New Team in League: Carlisle United

The 1928–29 season was the 37th season of The Football League.

== Final league tables ==
The tables and results below are reproduced here with home and away statistics separated, as per RSSSF and Rothmans Book of Football League Records 1888–89 to 1978–79.

Beginning with the season 1894–95, clubs finishing level on points were separated according to goal average (goals scored divided by goals conceded), or more properly put, goal ratio. When two teams had the same goal difference, this system favoured those teams who had scored fewer goals. The goal average system was eventually scrapped beginning with the 1976–77 season.

From the 1922–23 season, re-election was required of the bottom two teams of both Third Division North and Third Division South.

== First Division ==
First Division
- Season: 1928–29
- Champions: The Wednesday; 3rd English title
- Relegated: Bury; Cardiff City
- Matches: 462
- Goals: 1,688 (3.65 per match)
- Top goalscorer: Dave Halliday (43 goals)
- Biggest home win: Leicester City 10–0 Portsmouth (20 October 1928); Sheffield United 10–0 Burnley (19 January 1929)
- Biggest away win: Newcastle United 2–7 Burnley (29 April 1929)
- Highest scoring: Leicester City 10–0 Portsmouth (20 October 1928); Sheffield United 10–0 Burnley (19 January 1929); West Ham United 8–2 Leeds United (9 February 1929)

Pos	Team	Pld	W	D	L	GF	GA	GAv	Pts	Relegation
1	The Wednesday (C)	42	21	10	11	86	62	1.387	52	
2	Leicester City	42	21	9	12	96	67	1.433	51	
3	Aston Villa	42	23	4	15	98	81	1.210	50	
4	Sunderland	42	20	7	15	93	75	1.240	47	
5	Liverpool	42	17	12	13	90	64	1.406	46	
6	Derby County	42	18	10	14	86	71	1.211	46	
7	Blackburn Rovers	42	17	11	14	72	63	1.143	45	
8	Manchester City	42	18	9	15	95	86	1.105	45	
9	Arsenal	42	16	13	13	77	72	1.069	45	
10	Newcastle United	42	19	6	17	70	72	0.972	44	
11	Sheffield United	42	15	11	16	86	85	1.012	41	
12	Manchester United	42	14	13	15	66	76	0.868	41	
13	Leeds United	42	16	9	17	71	84	0.845	41	
14	Bolton Wanderers	42	14	12	16	73	80	0.913	40	
15	Birmingham	42	15	10	17	68	77	0.883	40	
16	Huddersfield Town	42	14	11	17	70	61	1.148	39	
17	West Ham United	42	15	9	18	86	96	0.896	39	
18	Everton	42	17	4	21	63	75	0.840	38	
19	Burnley	42	15	8	19	81	103	0.786	38	
20	Portsmouth	42	15	6	21	56	80	0.700	36	
21	Bury (R)	42	12	7	23	62	99	0.626	31	Relegation to the Second Division
22	Cardiff City (R)	42	8	13	21	43	59	0.729	29	Relegation to the Second Division

Source: World Football
Rules for classification: 1) Points; 2) Goal average; 3) Goals scored
(C) Champions; (R) Relegated

=== Results ===
Home \ Away	ARS	AST	BIR	BLB	BOL	BUR	BRY	CAR	DER	EVE	HUD	LEE	LEI	LIV	MCI	MUN	NEW	POR	SHU	SUN	WED	WHU
Arsenal		2–5	0–0	1–0	2–0	3–1	7–1	2–1	1–3	2–0	2–0	1–0	1–1	4–4	0–0	3–1	1–2	4–0	2–0	1–1	2–2	2–3
Aston Villa	4–2		1–2	2–1	3–5	4–2	7–1	1–0	2–3	2–0	4–1	1–0	4–2	3–1	5–1	0–0	1–1	3–2	3–2	3–1	4–1	5–2
Birmingham	1–1	2–4		4–0	0–2	3–6	3–2	0–0	1–4	1–3	1–2	5–1	1–0	0–0	4–1	1–1	0–0	1–0	2–2	1–0	4–1	2–2
Blackburn Rovers	5–2	2–5	4–1		1–3	1–1	1–1	2–0	3–1	2–1	1–1	0–1	1–1	2–1	2–2	0–3	2–0	4–0	1–1	2–0	4–1	2–0
Bolton Wanderers	1–2	3–1	6–2	0–3		0–1	0–1	1–0	3–0	2–3	1–1	4–1	5–0	0–0	1–1	1–1	1–0	4–2	3–1	2–2	2–2	4–1
Burnley	3–3	4–1	4–0	2–2	3–1		0–0	3–0	2–2	2–0	3–2	5–0	0–1	3–2	2–3	3–4	4–3	4–1	2–1	3–1	0–2	3–3
Bury	1–0	2–2	3–1	1–0	3–4	2–1		4–1	3–3	1–2	2–1	2–2	3–1	2–2	1–2	1–3	2–0	0–0	4–0	1–3	0–4	0–3
Cardiff City	1–1	0–2	1–4	1–1	1–1	7–0	4–0		3–0	0–2	0–0	2–1	1–2	1–2	1–3	2–2	2–0	1–1	0–0	0–1	3–1	3–2
Derby County	0–0	1–0	2–2	5–1	2–1	4–0	3–1	2–0		3–0	1–2	3–4	5–2	2–5	1–1	6–1	1–2	1–0	2–2	0–0	6–0	6–0
Everton	4–2	0–1	0–2	5–2	3–0	2–0	1–0	1–0	4–0		0–3	0–1	3–1	1–0	2–6	2–4	5–2	4–0	1–3	0–0	0–0	0–4
Huddersfield Town	0–1	3–0	0–0	0–2	4–1	7–1	0–2	1–1	0–0	3–1		6–1	1–1	1–3	2–2	1–2	2–1	3–1	6–1	1–2	0–0	4–0
Leeds United	1–1	4–1	0–1	0–1	2–2	2–1	3–1	3–0	1–1	3–1	1–2		4–3	2–2	4–1	3–2	0–0	3–2	2–0	0–3	0–2	4–1
Leicester City	1–1	4–1	5–3	2–1	6–1	1–1	5–2	2–0	1–0	4–1	4–1	4–4		2–0	3–2	2–1	1–1	10–0	3–1	1–0	1–1	5–0
Liverpool	2–4	4–0	1–2	1–1	3–0	8–0	3–0	2–0	3–0	1–2	2–3	1–1	6–3		1–1	2–3	2–1	0–0	1–2	5–2	3–2	2–1
Manchester City	4–1	3–0	2–3	1–2	5–1	4–1	6–4	1–1	2–3	5–1	3–2	3–0	2–3	2–3		2–2	2–4	2–1	3–1	5–3	2–2	4–2
Manchester United	4–1	2–2	1–0	1–4	1–1	1–0	1–0	1–1	0–1	1–1	1–0	1–2	1–1	2–2	1–2		5–0	0–0	1–1	3–0	2–1	2–3
Newcastle United	0–3	2–1	1–0	0–2	4–1	2–7	2–1	1–1	4–1	2–0	4–1	3–2	1–0	2–2	4–0	5–0		0–1	4–2	4–3	2–1	1–0
Portsmouth	2–0	3–2	3–1	2–2	4–4	3–1	4–1	0–1	1–5	3–0	1–0	0–2	1–0	0–1	1–0	3–0	0–1		2–3	4–0	3–2	3–0
Sheffield United	2–2	1–3	3–2	2–1	1–1	10–0	6–1	3–1	2–1	2–1	1–0	1–1	1–4	1–3	1–3	6–1	3–1	3–0		4–0	1–1	3–3
Sunderland	5–1	1–3	3–4	3–1	4–0	2–1	3–1	1–0	4–0	2–2	4–1	2–1	1–2	2–1	3–1	5–1	5–2	5–0	4–4		4–3	4–1
The Wednesday	3–2	4–1	3–0	1–0	0–0	1–1	3–1	1–0	5–0	1–0	1–1	4–2	1–0	3–2	4–0	2–1	3–1	2–1	5–2	2–1		6–0
West Ham United	3–4	4–1	2–1	3–3	3–0	4–0	2–3	1–1	2–2	2–4	1–1	8–2	2–1	1–1	3–0	3–1	1–0	0–1	4–0	3–3	3–2	

Updated to match(es) played on unknown. Source:
Legend: Blue = home team win; Yellow = draw; Red = away team win.

=== Maps ===
Locations of the Football League First Division London teams
Locations of the Football League First Division teams

== Second Division ==
Football League Second Division
- Season: 1928–29
- Champions: Middlesbrough (2nd title)
- Relegated: Clapton Orient; Port Vale
- Matches: 462
- Goals: 1,576 (3.41 per match)
- Top goalscorer: Jimmy Hampson (Blackpool), 40
- Biggest home win: Port Vale – West Bromwich Albion 8–1 (9 Mar 1929); Blackpool – Reading 7–0 (10 Nov 1929); Preston North End – Reading 7–0 (27 Apr 1929)
- Biggest away win: Millwall – Wolverhampton Wanderers 0–5 (3 Sept 1928)
- Highest scoring: Middlesbrough – Wolverhampton Wanderers 8–3 (9 Feb 1929)

Pos	Team	Pld	W	D	L	GF	GA	GAv	Pts	Promotion or relegation
1	Middlesbrough (C, P)	42	22	11	9	92	57	1.614	55	Promotion to the First Division
2	Grimsby Town (P)	42	24	5	13	82	61	1.344	53	Promotion to the First Division
3	Bradford (Park Avenue)	42	22	4	16	88	70	1.257	48	
4	Southampton	42	17	14	11	74	60	1.233	48	
5	Notts County	42	19	9	14	78	65	1.200	47	
6	Stoke City	42	17	12	13	74	51	1.451	46	
7	West Bromwich Albion	42	19	8	15	80	79	1.013	46	
8	Blackpool	42	19	7	16	92	76	1.211	45	
9	Chelsea	42	17	10	15	64	65	0.985	44	
10	Tottenham Hotspur	42	17	9	16	75	81	0.926	43	
11	Nottingham Forest	42	15	12	15	71	70	1.014	42	
12	Hull City	42	13	14	15	58	63	0.921	40	
13	Preston North End	42	15	9	18	78	79	0.987	39	
14	Millwall	42	16	7	19	71	86	0.826	39	
15	Reading	42	15	9	18	63	86	0.733	39	
16	Barnsley	42	16	6	20	69	66	1.045	38	
17	Wolverhampton Wanderers	42	15	7	20	77	81	0.951	37	
18	Oldham Athletic	42	16	5	21	54	75	0.720	37	
19	Swansea Town	42	13	10	19	62	75	0.827	36	
20	Bristol City	42	13	10	19	58	72	0.806	36	
21	Port Vale (R)	42	15	4	23	71	86	0.826	34	Relegation to the Third Division North
22	Clapton Orient (R)	42	12	8	22	45	72	0.625	32	Relegation to the Third Division South

(C) Champions; (P) Promoted; (R) Relegated

=== Results ===
Home \ Away	BAR	BLP	BPA	BRI	CHE	CLA	GRI	HUL	MID	MIL	NOT	NTC	OLD	PTV	PNE	REA	SOU	STK	SWA	TOT	WBA	WOL
Barnsley		3–1	1–2	4–2	0–1	2–0	0–2	2–2	2–2	2–2	1–2	2–0	2–1	6–0	4–1	2–3	4–1	4–2	2–1	4–1	2–0	2–2
Blackpool	0–1		3–0	2–1	0–1	0–1	1–1	2–1	3–0	3–0	2–2	3–2	4–0	4–0	3–2	7–0	3–0	2–0	2–2	2–2	0–2	3–0
Bradford Park Avenue	2–1	5–2		3–2	1–2	2–1	1–0	5–1	3–2	4–0	1–1	2–2	2–0	2–0	7–2	1–0	4–1	2–1	3–1	4–1	4–1	4–1
Bristol City	3–1	3–2	1–0		0–0	1–0	2–2	0–0	0–1	5–0	2–5	0–4	6–0	2–1	1–0	0–0	1–1	1–1	2–1	2–1	2–3	3–2
Chelsea	1–0	2–3	3–1	3–0		2–2	3–2	0–0	2–0	0–3	3–0	1–1	2–3	3–3	2–1	2–1	1–1	3–1	4–0	1–1	2–5	0–2
Clapton Orient	3–1	2–4	1–0	0–1	1–0		3–1	0–2	3–0	1–1	1–4	2–2	2–0	1–0	1–0	1–1	1–1	1–0	1–2	2–3	0–2	2–0
Grimsby Town	2–1	1–4	4–2	3–2	1–0	6–1		0–1	1–4	3–0	2–2	2–2	1–0	3–1	1–0	4–0	2–1	2–1	4–1	2–0	3–1	2–0
Hull City	0–0	1–3	1–0	5–1	2–2	0–0	2–3		1–1	4–0	0–1	1–1	1–0	2–0	5–1	3–0	2–2	1–3	1–1	1–1	4–1	1–3
Middlesbrough	1–0	4–1	5–3	3–1	4–5	4–0	3–0	1–1		3–0	1–0	3–1	1–0	5–1	2–3	0–0	1–2	1–0	0–0	3–0	1–1	8–3
Millwall	0–2	2–1	1–3	3–1	2–1	2–0	4–1	0–0	2–3		1–1	0–1	3–3	2–1	3–1	5–1	2–4	1–3	3–0	5–1	2–2	0–5
Nottingham Forest	1–3	2–0	3–2	1–1	3–0	0–0	0–1	3–1	1–1	0–4		1–2	3–1	2–2	4–1	1–2	1–1	1–5	2–1	2–2	1–2	2–1
Notts County	4–1	3–1	3–3	2–0	4–3	2–0	1–2	6–0	0–3	4–5	1–1		2–0	3–0	0–1	1–1	1–1	1–0	5–1	2–0	3–1	3–0
Oldham Athletic	1–0	4–2	2–1	1–0	1–0	1–1	0–3	0–1	1–3	4–1	2–0	3–2		1–1	2–0	2–1	3–1	1–0	2–1	3–1	3–0	0–4
Port Vale	3–0	1–0	0–1	5–0	1–0	3–0	0–3	4–1	2–3	5–2	4–2	3–0	2–1		3–2	4–0	1–2	1–2	0–0	2–1	8–1	1–4
Preston North End	2–1	3–1	2–0	2–2	3–0	5–2	5–2	1–0	0–0	3–4	3–2	0–1	3–2	7–1		7–0	0–1	2–2	2–2	2–2	1–1	5–1
Reading	1–0	4–1	4–0	2–1	3–3	4–2	1–3	3–0	2–3	0–2	0–3	1–2	6–1	2–1	0–0		0–1	1–1	2–0	4–3	5–3	3–0
Southampton	1–2	8–2	2–2	2–1	1–2	2–0	3–1	3–2	1–1	3–0	2–1	4–0	2–1	1–2	4–0	2–2		0–0	3–0	1–1	1–1	2–1
Stoke City	0–0	1–1	2–0	2–0	0–1	3–1	1–2	1–1	3–2	0–0	1–1	5–0	1–1	2–1	1–1	5–0	3–0		5–0	2–0	4–1	4–3
Swansea Town	2–1	5–5	3–1	0–2	0–1	0–1	2–1	0–1	2–0	2–0	3–5	1–0	3–2	2–0	5–0	0–1	1–1	3–3		4–0	6–1	2–0
Tottenham Hotspur	2–0	1–2	3–2	1–1	4–1	2–1	2–1	4–1	2–5	2–1	2–1	3–0	4–1	4–2	2–0	2–2	3–2	1–0	1–1		2–0	3–2
West Bromwich Albion	6–2	2–2	1–2	1–1	3–0	3–1	1–0	2–0	1–1	3–2	3–0	1–3	1–0	3–1	1–1	5–0	3–1	2–3	5–1	3–2		0–2
Wolverhampton Wanderers	3–1	1–5	3–1	2–1	1–1	3–2	2–2	2–4	3–3	0–1	2–3	3–1	0–0	4–0	1–2	2–0	1–1	4–0	0–0	4–2	0–1	

Updated to match(es) played on unknown. Source: Ian Laschke: Rothmans Book of Football League Records 1888–89 to 1978–79. Macdonald and Jane's, London & Sydney, 1980.
Legend: Blue = home team win; Yellow = draw; Red = away team win.

=== Maps ===
Locations of the Football League Second Division London teams
Locations of the Football League Second Division teams

== Third Division North ==
Football League Third Division North
- Season: 1928–29
- Champions: Bradford City (1st title)
- Failed re-election: Ashington
- Matches: 462
- Goals: 1,696 (3.67 per match)
- Top goalscorer: Jimmy McConnell (Carlisle United), 42

Pos	Team	Pld	W	D	L	GF	GA	GAv	Pts	Promotion or relegation
1	Bradford City (C, P)	42	27	9	6	128	43	2.977	63	Promotion to the Second Division
2	Stockport County	42	28	6	8	111	58	1.914	62	
3	Wrexham	42	21	10	11	91	69	1.319	52	
4	Wigan Borough	42	21	9	12	82	49	1.673	51	
5	Doncaster Rovers	42	20	10	12	76	66	1.152	50	
6	Lincoln City	42	21	6	15	91	67	1.358	48	
7	Tranmere Rovers	42	22	3	17	79	77	1.026	47	
8	Carlisle United	42	19	8	15	86	77	1.117	46	
9	Crewe Alexandra	42	18	8	16	80	68	1.176	44	
10	South Shields	42	18	8	16	83	74	1.122	44	
11	Chesterfield	42	18	5	19	71	77	0.922	41	
12	Southport	42	16	8	18	75	85	0.882	40	
13	Halifax Town	42	13	13	16	63	62	1.016	39	
14	New Brighton	42	15	9	18	64	71	0.901	39	
15	Nelson	42	17	5	20	77	90	0.856	39	
16	Rotherham United	42	15	9	18	60	77	0.779	39	
17	Rochdale	42	13	10	19	79	96	0.823	36	
18	Accrington Stanley	42	13	8	21	68	82	0.829	34	
19	Darlington	42	13	7	22	64	88	0.727	33	
20	Barrow	42	10	8	24	64	93	0.688	28	
21	Hartlepools United	42	10	6	26	59	112	0.527	26	Re-elected
22	Ashington (R)	42	8	7	27	45	115	0.391	23	Failed re-election and demoted

Source: rsssf.com
(C) Champions; (P) Promoted; (R) Relegated

=== Results ===
Home \ Away	ACC	ASH	BRW	BRA	CRL	CHF	CRE	DAR	DON	HAL	HAR	LIN	NEL	NWB	ROC	ROT	SOU	SSH	STP	TRA	WIG	WRE
Accrington Stanley		0–1	1–0	0–1	2–3	0–0	2–0	4–0	6–0	1–1	2–2	0–1	4–4	3–1	2–2	1–3	2–0	2–0	2–0	2–0	2–0	4–3
Ashington	2–2		1–0	2–8	0–4	0–2	0–5	4–2	4–7	0–3	3–1	1–1	3–2	1–1	2–1	0–1	1–3	1–3	0–1	3–2	1–1	2–2
Barrow	2–1	3–0		1–3	1–1	1–2	2–4	3–1	2–2	1–3	2–1	2–3	7–2	0–0	3–3	4–0	1–2	1–1	2–4	1–2	1–0	2–2
Bradford City	4–1	2–0	8–0		4–2	6–1	4–1	3–0	3–0	2–2	4–1	2–3	0–2	5–2	0–0	11–1	5–0	3–1	2–1	8–0	1–0	5–0
Carlisle United	4–3	5–1	4–1	2–2		1–2	1–0	3–0	1–2	2–1	8–0	3–1	4–0	2–1	4–2	1–1	4–2	5–0	0–5	4–1	2–1	1–1
Chesterfield	4–1	4–1	3–0	0–5	1–2		1–0	2–1	0–1	3–2	4–1	1–1	3–2	0–2	2–1	1–2	6–0	3–2	1–2	4–1	0–0	3–1
Crewe Alexandra	4–0	7–0	3–1	0–0	1–1	6–1		2–0	1–1	3–0	4–2	1–3	1–1	3–0	1–1	3–0	1–1	1–5	2–0	0–1	0–4	3–1
Darlington	0–0	4–0	1–2	3–3	0–0	2–2	4–2		1–0	2–0	4–1	2–1	3–2	3–1	5–3	2–1	3–1	2–2	2–3	1–2	3–0	0–0
Doncaster Rovers	4–1	2–1	1–0	1–1	3–0	2–0	0–1	3–1		1–0	4–1	0–0	2–2	1–2	4–2	1–0	4–2	2–1	0–2	2–1	1–2	1–0
Halifax Town	4–2	1–0	2–0	1–1	5–2	1–1	2–2	5–1	2–2		2–0	4–2	1–2	1–1	1–1	3–1	2–1	0–2	1–1	2–0	1–0	1–2
Hartlepool	1–3	1–3	1–0	1–3	1–0	0–2	2–1	2–0	2–2	3–1		3–2	2–2	5–2	0–2	1–1	4–2	0–5	1–1	4–1	1–3	0–2
Lincoln City	3–1	3–1	5–0	3–4	3–0	1–0	1–0	0–0	2–1	3–0	7–1		5–1	4–0	2–0	1–1	4–1	5–0	1–2	3–1	1–3	1–1
Nelson	0–2	5–0	3–4	0–1	1–0	1–0	4–1	2–1	2–4	3–1	1–0	3–4		3–0	3–0	4–2	1–1	1–0	4–1	4–2	2–1	1–3
New Brighton	2–1	3–2	1–3	0–3	1–0	2–3	2–3	1–0	1–1	1–0	1–3	6–1	0–1		6–1	0–0	3–1	1–0	4–1	1–2	2–2	2–0
Rochdale	2–1	5–0	4–2	1–3	4–0	2–1	2–1	5–0	1–3	2–2	7–4	0–2	2–1	4–2		2–1	1–1	1–2	1–3	5–1	0–0	4–4
Rotherham United	2–1	0–0	2–1	2–2	4–0	2–0	1–2	2–0	1–2	0–0	3–2	3–2	4–0	3–1	5–0		0–2	1–1	3–3	0–1	4–2	2–1
Southport	3–1	2–1	2–2	0–3	4–3	1–0	6–2	3–1	3–3	1–0	6–2	2–1	5–1	0–0	1–1	2–0		5–0	1–1	1–2	3–0	1–3
South Shields	3–0	0–0	2–2	1–1	5–0	6–3	3–0	1–3	1–0	2–1	1–1	1–0	3–2	0–2	5–1	10–1	4–0		0–1	4–1	2–2	3–2
Stockport County	6–1	4–0	3–2	2–1	2–2	3–1	2–2	7–3	4–1	3–0	3–0	7–3	3–0	2–1	4–0	1–0	2–1	7–1		4–1	2–1	6–2
Tranmere	1–1	3–2	2–1	1–0	1–2	3–0	1–2	4–0	1–1	2–1	3–0	2–1	6–1	1–3	5–1	3–0	6–1	4–0	2–1		3–2	1–1
Wigan Borough	5–2	5–1	2–1	2–0	2–2	5–1	4–2	2–0	4–2	1–1	2–0	4–0	1–0	1–1	4–1	1–0	1–0	4–0	4–0	0–1		1–1
Wrexham	4–1	4–0	5–0	2–1	5–1	4–3	1–2	4–3	4–2	2–2	3–1	2–1	3–1	1–1	3–0	2–0	3–1	1–0	2–1	3–1	1–3	

Updated to match(es) played on unknown. Source: Ian Laschke: Rothmans Book of Football League Records 1888–89 to 1978–79. Macdonald and Jane's, London & Sydney, 1980.
Legend: Blue = home team win; Yellow = draw; Red = away team win.

=== Maps ===
Locations of the Football League Third Division North teams

== Third Division South ==
Football League Third Division South
- Season: 1928–29
- Champions: Charlton Athletic (1st title)
- Failed re-election: None
- Matches: 462
- Goals: 1,614 (3.49 per match)
- Top goalscorer: Andy Rennie (Luton Town), 43

Pos	Team	Pld	W	D	L	GF	GA	GAv	Pts	Qualification or relegation
1	Charlton Athletic (C, P)	42	23	8	11	86	60	1.433	54	Promotion to the Second Division
2	Crystal Palace	42	23	8	11	81	67	1.209	54	
3	Northampton Town	42	20	12	10	96	57	1.684	52	
4	Plymouth Argyle	42	20	12	10	83	51	1.627	52	
5	Fulham	42	21	10	11	101	71	1.423	52	
6	Queens Park Rangers	42	19	14	9	82	61	1.344	52	
7	Luton Town	42	19	11	12	89	73	1.219	49	
8	Watford	42	19	10	13	79	74	1.068	48	
9	Bournemouth & Boscombe Athletic	42	19	9	14	84	77	1.091	47	
10	Swindon Town	42	15	13	14	75	72	1.042	43	
11	Coventry City	42	14	14	14	62	57	1.088	42	
12	Southend United	42	15	11	16	80	75	1.067	41	
13	Brentford	42	14	10	18	56	60	0.933	38	
14	Walsall	42	13	12	17	73	79	0.924	38	
15	Brighton & Hove Albion	42	16	6	20	58	76	0.763	38	
16	Newport County	42	13	9	20	69	86	0.802	35	
17	Norwich City	42	14	6	22	69	81	0.852	34	
18	Torquay United	42	14	6	22	66	84	0.786	34	
19	Bristol Rovers	42	13	7	22	60	79	0.759	33	
20	Merthyr Town	42	11	8	23	55	103	0.534	30	
21	Exeter City	42	9	11	22	67	88	0.761	29	Re-elected
22	Gillingham	42	10	9	23	43	83	0.518	29	Re-elected

(C) Champions; (P) Promoted

=== Results ===
Home \ Away	B&BA	BRE	B&HA	BRR	CHA	COV	CRY	EXE	FUL	GIL	LUT	MER	NPC	NOR	NWC	PLY	QPR	STD	SWI	TOR	WAL	WAT
Bournemouth & Boscombe Athletic		1–1	3–2	6–2	4–2	2–1	2–0	3–1	1–0	4–3	3–3	3–0	0–1	2–0	2–0	4–1	2–3	2–2	2–1	4–3	1–2	3–3
Brentford	0–0		5–1	2–0	1–0	1–0	2–4	4–2	1–2	4–1	0–1	2–1	1–3	2–2	4–0	0–2	1–1	1–0	2–0	0–0	1–0	0–1
Brighton & Hove Albion	1–0	3–2		4–0	2–3	0–1	1–5	3–2	2–0	3–1	1–0	2–1	2–1	0–3	3–0	2–1	2–1	2–1	2–2	1–2	2–1	1–1
Bristol Rovers	1–2	2–0	3–0		3–0	1–1	1–1	1–1	5–3	2–4	1–1	3–0	0–3	1–2	2–0	0–1	1–1	4–1	1–4	2–1	4–1	1–1
Charlton Athletic	6–2	1–0	3–0	1–2		3–1	1–3	3–1	0–0	1–1	4–1	2–2	2–2	3–1	1–0	2–1	2–2	3–2	4–1	2–0	5–0	2–0
Coventry City	1–2	1–0	3–0	2–0	0–1		1–3	1–1	1–2	2–0	1–1	6–1	3–1	0–2	3–0	1–4	0–0	1–1	4–1	2–1	1–1	1–1
Crystal Palace	1–3	1–0	1–0	5–2	0–2	0–3		1–0	2–1	3–0	3–0	2–0	1–1	1–0	2–1	1–4	1–4	3–2	6–1	2–0	1–1	3–0
Exeter City	6–3	2–3	4–1	2–2	2–5	2–3	1–2		1–4	4–2	1–1	5–0	6–1	2–0	3–1	1–2	1–1	1–2	1–1	1–3	1–1	2–2
Fulham	3–0	1–0	3–1	6–1	2–5	2–2	2–2	0–0		4–2	4–2	4–0	2–3	2–1	2–1	5–2	5–0	2–4	2–0	2–1	5–1	2–3
Gillingham	2–2	1–2	1–1	1–0	1–0	1–1	0–1	1–3	2–2		1–0	1–0	0–4	2–1	4–0	2–0	0–0	0–2	0–0	1–1	1–4	0–0
Luton Town	2–1	2–1	1–0	4–2	3–0	1–1	5–3	4–0	1–3	8–0		2–0	5–2	4–0	2–1	2–2	3–2	4–2	5–3	1–2	3–1	2–2
Merthyr Town	1–0	2–2	1–0	4–0	2–3	2–2	2–2	2–1	4–1	2–3	3–4		2–1	2–2	2–1	2–2	1–2	2–1	0–0	3–0	1–0	2–1
Newport County	0–2	1–1	1–2	2–0	2–0	2–1	1–3	1–1	3–3	5–0	1–2	6–1		0–3	2–2	1–0	0–0	2–2	0–1	4–1	3–1	0–2
Northampton Town	2–0	1–1	1–1	3–1	4–1	3–3	8–1	4–0	3–3	1–0	2–2	4–1	7–0		2–0	3–0	4–2	2–3	1–1	6–1	4–2	3–0
Norwich City	5–1	2–4	3–1	2–1	0–1	3–0	0–1	5–0	2–2	1–2	3–0	3–1	3–1	1–1		0–3	3–1	2–5	1–1	3–0	2–1	5–2
Plymouth Argyle	2–0	4–0	1–0	2–0	2–2	3–0	1–1	0–0	4–2	3–0	2–0	4–0	5–2	1–1	4–0		1–2	1–1	3–0	4–0	2–2	2–0
Queens Park Rangers	0–0	2–2	3–2	0–3	2–2	3–1	1–1	1–0	2–1	1–0	1–1	8–0	0–0	4–1	3–0	2–0		3–1	4–2	5–1	2–2	3–2
Southend	4–4	1–1	1–1	1–0	1–3	0–0	3–0	1–0	0–1	2–0	5–0	5–1	4–2	2–2	5–3	1–1	0–3		1–1	3–0	3–1	1–3
Swindon Town	3–3	3–1	2–2	2–1	1–1	1–2	3–2	2–0	1–2	2–1	4–2	2–1	5–2	0–1	1–2	0–0	2–1	3–1		1–1	5–1	5–0
Torquay United	4–1	4–1	5–1	0–1	3–1	0–2	1–2	1–3	1–1	2–1	2–2	6–2	4–1	0–1	0–3	2–2	3–4	2–1	2–4		3–2	1–0
Walsall	2–1	2–0	1–2	1–3	0–2	0–0	3–1	7–2	2–2	4–0	0–0	1–1	3–1	4–3	3–3	1–1	3–1	4–1	1–1	1–0		4–0
Watford	0–3	2–0	2–1	1–0	3–1	4–2	3–3	3–0	2–3	1–0	3–2	4–0	3–0	1–1	2–2	6–3	4–1	4–1	3–2	0–2	4–1	

Updated to match(es) played on unknown. Source: Ian Laschke: Rothmans Book of Football League Records 1888–89 to 1978–79. Macdonald and Jane's, London & Sydney, 1980.
Legend: Blue = home team win; Yellow = draw; Red = away team win.

=== Maps ===
Locations of the Football League Third Division South London teams
Locations of the Football League Third Division South teams

== Attendances ==
=== Division One ===
No.	Club	Average	Highest	Lowest
1	Manchester City FC	31,715	61,007	15,198
2	Newcastle United FC	31,667	65,838	17,587
3	Aston Villa FC	29,531	56,528	8,496
4	Everton FC	29,513	55,415	7,996
5	Liverpool FC	28,257	45,095	8,852
6	The Wednesday	27,113	57,143	13,705
7	Arsenal FC	26,690	43,327	11,696
8	Sunderland AFC	25,196	50,519	9,469
9	Leicester City FC	23,773	35,744	12,938
10	Manchester United	23,659	42,555	12,020
11	Leeds United FC	22,402	32,866	8,151
12	Sheffield United FC	22,395	44,576	11,849
13	Birmingham City FC	20,646	36,261	11,001
14	Portsmouth FC	20,225	33,475	11,973
15	West Ham United FC	19,989	33,221	8,603
16	Bolton Wanderers FC	19,419	37,181	10,271
17	Burnley FC	17,239	35,694	6,238
18	Derby County FC	16,866	30,651	9,319
19	Blackburn Rovers FC	16,841	33,966	5,461
20	Huddersfield Town AFC	16,720	39,869	3,997
21	Cardiff City FC	15,256	20,439	5,738
22	Bury FC	14,507	27,167	5,352
