= Gamine (disambiguation) =

Gamine is a term for an mischievous, playful, elfish, and pert girl or young woman.

Gamine may also refer to:

- Gamine, a term for female street children.
- Gamine, a brothel founded by Emily Robin in Hull, England in 1898
- Gamine, champion American racehorse

== See also ==
- Gamín, a 1977 documentary film about street children in Bogotá
