= Kevin Wood =

Kevin Wood may refer to:

- Kevin Wood (footballer) (1929–2012), English footballer
- Kevin Wood (guitarist) (born 1961), American guitarist
