= Frank Lynn =

Frank Lynn may refer to:

- Frank Lynn (footballer)
- Frank Lynn, a pseudonym used by composer Joseph Schillinger
