= Brian Woodward =

Brian Woodward may refer to:

- Brian Woodward (footballer) (1929–2014), English footballer
- Brian Woodward (speedway rider) (1952–2022), Welsh motorcycle speedway rider

== See also ==
- Bryan Woodward (born 1974), American middle distance runner
