= 1929 in British television =

This is a list of British television related events in 1929.

== Events ==
Month	Day	Event
August	20	First transmissions of Baird's 30-line television system by the BBC in London.
November		The BBC and John Logie Baird begin daily experimental broadcasting of 30-line television transmissions using the BBC's 2LO transmitter.

== Births ==
- 17 February – Patricia Routledge, actress (died 2025)
- 21 February – James Beck, actor (died 1973)
- 24 March – Francis Essex, television producer (died 2009)
- 5 April – Nigel Hawthorne, actor (died 2001)
- 14 April – Gerry Anderson, puppeteer, television producer and director (died 2012)
- 18 April – Peter Jeffrey, actor (died 1999)
- 25 May – Arthur Montford, Scottish sports journalist (died 2014)
- 26 May – Lloyd Reckord, Jamaican-born actor (died 2015)
- 9 July – Christopher Morahan, director and production executive (died 2017)
- 19 July – Denis Goodwin, comedy scriptwriter (suicide 1975)
- 30 August – Ian McNaught-Davis, television presenter (died 2014)
- 14 September – Michael Peacock, television executive (died 2019)
- 25 September – Ronnie Barker, comic actor (died 2005)
- 27 November – Alan Simpson, comedy scriptwriter (died 2017)
- 16 December – Nicholas Courtney, actor (Doctor Who) (died 2011)
- 25 December – Stuart Hall, journalist and television presenter
- 26 December – Irene Shubik, television drama producer (died 2019)

== See also ==
- 1929 in British music
- 1929 in the United Kingdom
- List of British films of 1929
