= 1929–30 Football League =

38th season of the Football League

The Football League
- Season: 1929–30
- Champions: Sheffield Wednesday
- Relegated: Merthyr Town
- New Team in League: York City

The 1929–30 season was the 38th season of The Football League.

== Final league tables ==
The tables and results below are reproduced here in the exact form that they can be found at The Rec.Sport.Soccer Statistics Foundation website and in Rothmans Book of Football League Records 1888–89 to 1978–79, with home and away statistics separated.

Beginning with the season 1894–95, clubs finishing level on points were separated according to goal average (goals scored divided by goals conceded), or more properly put, goal ratio. In case one or more teams had the same goal difference, this system favoured those teams who had scored fewer goals. The goal average system was eventually scrapped beginning with the 1976–77 season. From the 1922–23 season onwards, re-election was required of the bottom two teams of both Third Division North and Third Division South.

== First Division ==
First Division
- Season: 1929–30
- Champions: Sheffield Wednesday; 4th English title
- Relegated: Burnley; Everton
- Matches: 462
- Goals: 1,758 (3.81 per match)
- Top goalscorer: Vic Watson (41 goals)
- Biggest home win: Blackburn Rovers 7–0 Middlesbrough (1 January 1930); Arsenal 8–1 Sheffield United (12 April 1930)
- Biggest away win: Liverpool 0–6 Sunderland (19 April 1930)
- Highest scoring: Blackburn Rovers 7–5 Birmingham (28 September 1929); Sheffield United 5–7 Blackburn Rovers (3 March 1930); Leicester City 6–6 Arsenal (21 April 1930)

Pos	Team	Pld	W	D	L	GF	GA	GAv	Pts	Relegation
1	Sheffield Wednesday (C)	42	26	8	8	105	57	1.842	60	
2	Derby County	42	21	8	13	90	82	1.098	50	
3	Manchester City	42	19	9	14	91	81	1.123	47	
4	Aston Villa	42	21	5	16	92	83	1.108	47	
5	Leeds United	42	20	6	16	79	63	1.254	46	
6	Blackburn Rovers	42	19	7	16	99	93	1.065	45	
7	West Ham United	42	19	5	18	86	79	1.089	43	
8	Leicester City	42	17	9	16	86	90	0.956	43	
9	Sunderland	42	18	7	17	76	80	0.950	43	
10	Huddersfield Town	42	17	9	16	63	69	0.913	43	
11	Birmingham	42	16	9	17	67	62	1.081	41	
12	Liverpool	42	16	9	17	63	79	0.797	41	
13	Portsmouth	42	15	10	17	66	62	1.065	40	
14	Arsenal	42	14	11	17	78	66	1.182	39	
15	Bolton Wanderers	42	15	9	18	74	74	1.000	39	
16	Middlesbrough	42	16	6	20	82	84	0.976	38	
17	Manchester United	42	15	8	19	67	88	0.761	38	
18	Grimsby Town	42	15	7	20	73	89	0.820	37	
19	Newcastle United	42	15	7	20	71	92	0.772	37	
20	Sheffield United	42	15	6	21	91	96	0.948	36	
21	Burnley (R)	42	14	8	20	79	97	0.814	36	Relegation to the Second Division
22	Everton (R)	42	12	11	19	80	92	0.870	35	Relegation to the Second Division

Rules for classification: 1) Points; 2) Goal average; 3) Goals scored
(C) Champions; (R) Relegated

=== Results ===
Home \ Away	ARS	AST	BIR	BLB	BOL	BUR	DER	EVE	GRI	HUD	LEE	LEI	LIV	MCI	MUN	MID	NEW	POR	SHU	SHW	SUN	WHU
Arsenal		2–4	1–0	4–0	1–2	6–1	1–1	4–0	4–1	2–0	4–0	1–1	0–1	3–2	4–2	1–2	0–1	1–2	8–1	2–3	0–1	0–1
Aston Villa	5–2		2–1	3–0	2–0	1–2	2–2	5–2	4–1	5–3	3–4	3–0	2–3	0–2	1–0	4–2	2–0	0–1	5–1	1–3	2–1	2–3
Birmingham	2–3	1–1		1–2	3–1	2–0	2–4	0–0	0–2	4–1	1–0	3–0	1–0	3–0	0–1	1–1	5–1	1–0	2–1	1–0	3–1	4–2
Blackburn Rovers	1–1	2–0	7–5		3–1	8–3	0–3	3–1	4–1	5–2	2–1	3–1	1–0	1–3	5–4	7–0	4–2	1–0	0–1	0–1	5–3	3–3
Bolton Wanderers	0–0	3–0	0–0	2–1		1–1	1–2	5–0	2–3	7–1	4–2	1–0	0–2	1–2	4–1	2–2	1–1	2–1	2–1	1–3	3–0	4–1
Burnley	2–2	1–4	3–1	3–2	2–2		6–2	1–1	3–1	1–3	0–3	1–1	4–1	4–2	4–0	4–1	0–3	4–0	5–0	2–4	2–0	1–1
Derby County	4–1	4–0	3–1	4–3	2–1	1–3		2–1	5–4	2–2	3–0	2–2	2–2	4–2	1–1	3–1	3–1	3–2	2–1	4–1	3–0	4–3
Everton	1–1	3–4	2–4	2–2	3–3	3–0	4–0		2–4	0–2	1–1	4–5	3–3	2–3	0–0	3–2	5–2	1–1	3–2	1–4	4–1	1–2
Grimsby Town	1–1	0–2	2–1	5–3	1–1	4–0	2–1	0–3		4–2	1–2	1–4	3–2	2–2	2–2	0–3	4–0	1–1	4–1	0–5	0–1	2–2
Huddersfield Town	2–2	1–1	1–1	0–0	0–2	3–0	0–1	1–2	0–1		1–0	3–2	3–0	1–1	2–2	1–0	2–0	2–1	2–2	4–1	0–2	3–0
Leeds United	2–0	4–1	1–0	4–2	2–1	3–0	2–1	2–1	6–0	0–1		1–2	1–1	3–2	3–1	1–2	5–2	1–0	2–2	3–0	5–0	1–3
Leicester City	6–6	4–3	2–1	1–1	5–2	4–3	0–0	5–4	1–0	1–2	2–2		2–1	3–1	4–1	4–1	6–1	0–5	3–3	2–1	1–2	1–2
Liverpool	1–0	2–0	1–1	1–1	3–0	1–3	2–2	0–3	2–0	3–0	1–0	1–1		1–6	1–0	5–2	0–0	2–0	2–0	1–3	0–6	3–1
Manchester City	3–1	1–2	1–4	1–1	2–0	2–2	3–0	1–2	3–1	1–1	4–1	3–2	4–3		0–1	3–1	3–0	5–2	2–1	3–3	2–2	4–3
Manchester United	1–0	2–3	0–0	1–0	1–1	1–0	3–2	3–3	2–5	1–0	3–1	2–1	1–2	1–3		0–3	5–0	3–0	1–5	2–2	2–1	4–2
Middlesbrough	1–1	2–3	5–1	2–4	3–1	3–1	4–0	1–2	1–5	1–3	1–1	0–2	5–0	1–0	2–3		2–2	2–0	3–1	4–1	3–0	2–0
Newcastle United	1–1	2–2	1–1	5–1	2–3	2–1	2–3	1–0	3–1	5–2	2–1	2–1	3–1	2–2	4–1	3–2		4–1	3–5	1–3	3–0	1–0
Portsmouth	0–1	1–2	2–1	4–0	3–0	7–1	3–1	1–4	1–1	0–1	0–0	3–0	3–3	2–2	3–0	1–1	2–0		3–1	0–4	1–1	3–1
Sheffield United	4–1	3–3	4–2	5–7	2–3	3–1	2–0	2–0	2–3	0–1	3–2	7–1	4–0	1–2	3–1	1–3	1–0	2–3		2–2	4–2	4–2
Sheffield Wednesday	0–2	3–0	1–1	4–0	1–0	4–1	6–3	4–0	1–0	3–1	1–2	4–0	2–1	5–1	7–2	1–0	4–2	1–1	1–1		1–1	2–1
Sunderland	0–1	4–1	2–0	3–1	4–1	3–3	3–1	2–2	2–0	1–0	1–4	2–1	2–3	5–2	2–4	3–2	1–0	1–1	3–2	2–4		4–2
West Ham United	3–2	5–2	0–1	2–3	5–3	1–0	2–0	3–1	2–0	2–3	3–0	1–2	4–1	3–0	2–1	5–3	5–1	0–1	1–0	1–1	1–1	

Updated to match(es) played on unknown. Source:
Legend: Blue = home team win; Yellow = draw; Red = away team win.

=== Maps ===
Locations of the Football League First Division London teams
Locations of the Football League First Division teams

== Second Division ==
Second Division
- Season: 1929–30
- Champions: Blackpool
- Promoted: Blackpool; Chelsea
- Relegated: Hull City; Notts County
- Matches: 462
- Goals: 1,513 (3.27 per match)
- Top goalscorer: Jimmy Hampson (45 goals)
- Biggest home win: Blackpool 7–1 Bristol City (26 October 1929); Oldham Athletic 6–0 Wolverhampton Wanderers (9 November 1929); Bradford Park Avenue 6–0 Millwall (3 March 1930)
- Biggest away win: Nottingham Forest 0–5 Southampton (28 September 1929)
- Highest scoring: Preston North End 4–6 Blackpool (19 October 1929); West Bromwich Albion 7–3 Wolverhampton Wanderers (28 December 1929)

Pos	Team	Pld	W	D	L	GF	GA	GAv	Pts	Relegation
1	Blackpool (C, P)	42	27	4	11	98	67	1.463	58	Promotion to the First Division
2	Chelsea (P)	42	22	11	9	74	46	1.609	55	Promotion to the First Division
3	Oldham Athletic	42	21	11	10	90	51	1.765	53	
4	Bradford (Park Avenue)	42	19	12	11	91	70	1.300	50	
5	Bury	42	22	5	15	78	67	1.164	49	
6	West Bromwich Albion	42	21	5	16	105	73	1.438	47	
7	Southampton	42	17	11	14	77	76	1.013	45	
8	Cardiff City	42	18	8	16	61	59	1.034	44	
9	Wolverhampton Wanderers	42	16	9	17	77	79	0.975	41	
10	Nottingham Forest	42	13	15	14	55	69	0.797	41	
11	Stoke City	42	16	8	18	74	72	1.028	40	
12	Tottenham Hotspur	42	15	9	18	59	61	0.967	39	
13	Charlton Athletic	42	14	11	17	59	63	0.937	39	
14	Millwall	42	12	15	15	57	73	0.781	39	
15	Swansea Town	42	14	9	19	57	61	0.934	37	
16	Preston North End	42	13	11	18	65	80	0.813	37	
17	Barnsley	42	14	8	20	56	71	0.789	36	
18	Bradford City	42	12	12	18	60	77	0.779	36	
19	Reading	42	12	11	19	54	67	0.806	35	
20	Bristol City	42	13	9	20	61	83	0.735	35	
21	Hull City (R)	42	14	7	21	51	78	0.654	35	Relegation to the Third Division North
22	Notts County (R)	42	9	15	18	54	70	0.771	33	Relegation to the Third Division South

Rules for classification: 1) Points; 2) Goal average; 3) Goals scored
(C) Champions; (P) Promoted; (R) Relegated

=== Results ===
Home \ Away	BAR	BLP	BRA	BPA	BRI	BRY	CAR	CHA	CHE	HUL	MIL	NOT	NTC	OLD	PNE	REA	SOU	STK	SWA	TOT	WBA	WOL
Barnsley		2–4	2–1	1–1	3–1	2–1	2–2	2–0	1–1	3–0	1–2	1–1	2–2	2–1	0–0	1–0	3–1	3–1	1–0	2–0	2–2	3–1
Blackpool	2–1		3–0	1–0	7–1	2–1	3–0	6–0	1–1	1–2	4–3	5–1	1–2	3–0	5–1	4–2	5–1	0–2	3–0	3–2	1–0	3–2
Bradford City	0–1	1–1		1–2	3–0	2–1	0–1	4–1	0–1	2–1	1–1	1–1	2–0	2–4	1–1	1–0	2–5	3–0	3–3	0–2	2–2	2–2
Bradford Park Avenue	4–4	5–0	0–2		3–1	2–1	2–0	4–0	1–3	4–2	6–0	5–1	3–3	2–2	5–2	5–2	1–1	3–2	3–0	2–1	5–1	0–0
Bristol City	2–1	0–1	1–3	0–0		1–2	2–0	1–1	2–1	4–0	1–0	4–1	0–0	0–4	2–2	5–3	3–1	2–6	2–1	1–0	2–1	1–2
Bury	2–1	0–1	2–4	5–1	2–0		4–2	2–2	1–0	2–1	5–1	0–0	2–0	0–2	1–2	2–4	4–2	2–0	1–0	2–1	3–2	3–1
Cardiff City	1–0	4–2	0–1	2–0	1–1	5–1		1–0	1–0	0–1	3–1	1–1	3–1	5–0	2–0	2–1	5–2	1–2	0–0	1–0	3–2	0–0
Charlton Athletic	2–0	1–4	1–3	2–0	3–1	1–2	4–1		1–1	4–0	1–1	5–0	1–0	1–1	1–1	0–0	4–1	4–4	0–2	1–0	0–1	2–0
Chelsea	2–0	4–0	3–2	1–2	2–1	5–3	1–0	1–1		3–0	3–0	2–0	3–1	1–1	5–0	1–0	2–0	3–2	1–0	3–0	2–0	1–1
Hull City	2–0	0–3	0–0	0–2	0–1	1–3	2–2	0–2	1–3		3–2	1–2	0–0	1–0	2–0	4–2	2–0	3–0	1–0	2–0	3–2	2–0
Millwall	2–1	3–1	2–2	1–2	1–1	2–4	2–0	1–1	0–0	0–0		2–2	2–0	2–1	2–0	3–1	1–1	2–1	0–2	2–5	2–1	4–0
Nottingham Forest	4–0	0–0	2–1	1–1	5–2	1–2	3–1	0–2	0–0	2–1	1–1		1–1	1–2	2–4	5–0	0–5	2–1	1–0	0–0	0–2	5–2
Notts County	3–0	0–2	2–0	1–1	3–1	1–3	2–1	4–0	2–2	4–1	1–1	0–0		1–1	0–3	3–0	1–2	3–3	0–0	0–1	2–1	0–3
Oldham Athletic	3–2	1–2	6–1	5–1	2–2	2–0	4–1	1–0	4–2	3–1	2–2	0–0	2–2		0–2	0–0	3–2	5–0	4–1	2–0	5–0	6–0
Preston North End	3–1	4–6	2–2	4–1	2–2	1–1	2–3	0–3	1–2	1–2	3–1	1–2	3–1	0–3		2–1	1–1	5–1	0–0	4–0	2–2	1–1
Reading	1–0	1–1	1–1	1–0	1–6	0–1	2–0	3–1	3–1	1–1	0–1	0–1	2–0	1–1	2–0		1–1	0–0	3–1	3–0	2–2	3–1
Southampton	4–0	4–2	2–1	2–2	3–0	0–0	1–1	2–0	4–2	2–2	0–0	2–0	2–2	2–0	1–2	4–3		2–1	2–1	1–0	3–2	3–1
Stoke City	3–0	0–1	2–0	2–1	6–2	1–0	1–1	2–1	1–1	3–1	1–0	6–0	1–1	0–2	2–3	2–2	4–0		0–1	1–0	0–3	3–0
Swansea Town	0–2	3–0	5–0	2–4	1–1	2–4	1–0	2–0	3–0	2–0	3–1	1–1	3–2	3–0	4–0	0–1	2–2	2–2		0–1	1–0	2–2
Tottenham Hotspur	2–1	6–1	1–1	1–1	2–1	2–2	1–2	3–0	3–3	2–2	1–1	1–1	2–0	2–1	1–0	0–0	3–2	3–1	3–0		0–2	4–2
West Bromwich Albion	4–2	5–1	4–2	5–0	2–0	5–1	0–2	1–1	2–0	7–1	6–1	1–3	4–2	0–3	2–0	1–0	5–1	2–3	6–2	4–3		7–3
Wolverhampton Wanderers	3–0	1–2	6–0	4–4	1–0	2–0	4–0	0–4	0–1	4–2	1–1	2–1	5–1	1–1	4–0	2–1	2–0	2–1	4–1	3–0	2–4	

Updated to match(es) played on unknown. Source: Ian Laschke: Rothmans Book of Football League Records 1888–89 to 1978–79. Macdonald and Jane’s, London & Sydney, 1980.
Legend: Blue = home team win; Yellow = draw; Red = away team win.

=== Maps ===
Locations of the Football League Second Division London teams
Locations of the Football League Second Division teams

== Third Division North ==
Football League Third Division North
- Season: 1929–30
- Champions: Port Vale (1st title)
- Failed re-election: None
- Matches: 462
- Goals: 1,681 (3.64 per match)
- Top goalscorer: Frank Newton (Stockport County), 36

Pos	Team	Pld	W	D	L	GF	GA	GAv	Pts	Promotion
1	Port Vale (C, P)	42	30	7	5	103	37	2.784	67	Promotion to the Second Division
2	Stockport County	42	28	7	7	106	44	2.409	63	
3	Darlington	42	22	6	14	108	73	1.479	50	
4	Chesterfield	42	22	6	14	76	56	1.357	50	
5	Lincoln City	42	17	14	11	83	61	1.361	48	
6	York City	42	15	16	11	77	64	1.203	46	
7	South Shields (Note: After this season, South Shields moved to Gateshead and became Gateshead A.F.C.)	42	18	10	14	77	74	1.041	46	
8	Hartlepools United	42	17	11	14	81	74	1.095	45	
9	Southport	42	15	13	14	81	74	1.095	43	
10	Rochdale	42	18	7	17	89	91	0.978	43	
11	Crewe Alexandra	42	17	8	17	82	71	1.155	42	
12	Tranmere Rovers	42	16	9	17	83	86	0.965	41	
13	New Brighton	42	16	8	18	69	79	0.873	40	
14	Doncaster Rovers	42	15	9	18	62	69	0.899	39	
15	Carlisle United	42	16	7	19	90	101	0.891	39	
16	Accrington Stanley	42	14	9	19	84	81	1.037	37	
17	Wrexham	42	13	8	21	67	88	0.761	34	
18	Wigan Borough	42	13	7	22	60	88	0.682	33	
19	Nelson	42	13	7	22	51	80	0.638	33	
20	Rotherham United	42	11	8	23	67	113	0.593	30	
21	Halifax Town	42	10	8	24	44	79	0.557	28	Re-elected
22	Barrow	42	11	5	26	41	98	0.418	27	Re-elected

Source: rsssf.com
(C) Champions; (P) Promoted

=== Results ===
Home \ Away	ACC	BRW	CRL	CHF	CRE	DAR	DON	HAL	HAR	LIN	NEL	NWB	PTV	ROC	ROT	SOU	SSH	STP	TRA	WIG	WRE	YOR
Accrington Stanley		3–1	7–2	3–0	0–3	3–1	3–3	7–1	3–0	0–3	3–0	5–0	0–2	6–2	2–0	1–1	1–2	0–1	3–3	3–1	1–3	1–1
Barrow	3–1		0–2	0–1	1–0	0–1	1–0	0–4	3–0	2–1	0–2	3–0	1–1	2–0	5–1	0–2	1–3	1–4	1–1	4–1	3–3	0–0
Carlisle United	2–1	7–1		6–0	2–0	1–4	1–1	2–0	5–1	2–4	2–2	2–2	1–4	2–0	3–1	4–0	4–1	1–5	4–3	5–0	5–1	2–2
Chesterfield	4–2	2–1	3–1		5–1	4–1	2–1	2–0	2–0	2–1	3–0	1–0	1–1	2–0	2–1	2–0	1–2	1–3	1–0	5–0	5–0	3–0
Crewe Alexandra	2–1	0–0	1–2	2–1		1–2	4–0	4–1	5–2	1–1	4–0	2–3	0–2	6–1	6–1	5–4	2–2	1–1	3–1	2–1	2–0	2–2
Darlington	2–4	4–0	3–0	1–4	3–0		6–2	3–2	0–0	1–1	6–1	1–2	0–1	3–0	8–1	2–1	8–3	1–2	7–2	2–0	5–1	5–2
Doncaster Rovers	3–1	4–0	1–4	2–1	2–1	3–1		1–0	0–0	0–0	3–0	1–1	0–2	3–1	2–0	3–1	1–0	1–1	1–1	4–2	4–2	0–3
Halifax Town	1–1	0–1	1–0	3–2	1–3	3–1	1–0		0–0	1–1	1–1	4–0	1–2	2–3	1–1	1–1	0–2	0–3	0–1	2–1	2–0	2–2
Hartlepool	2–2	2–0	1–0	0–0	5–1	2–5	3–0	3–0		4–0	1–2	1–1	2–0	2–8	5–1	1–1	2–1	0–1	2–0	4–0	5–0	3–1
Lincoln City	3–3	3–0	4–1	2–1	2–2	2–2	3–1	0–1	2–2		4–1	5–3	3–2	0–0	1–1	1–1	2–2	1–0	8–0	2–0	3–0	3–0
Nelson	2–1	2–0	2–2	0–2	1–1	0–1	4–1	1–0	3–2	0–0		2–1	2–3	1–0	0–1	2–2	0–1	1–2	0–1	1–3	4–0	3–1
New Brighton	5–0	5–0	2–1	1–1	3–1	1–3	1–0	4–0	0–0	1–4	2–1		0–1	2–0	2–2	1–3	4–1	3–2	3–0	5–0	2–1	1–1
Port Vale	5–2	5–0	4–0	4–1	2–0	0–2	2–1	3–0	2–1	5–2	3–1	5–0		3–3	7–1	1–0	3–0	1–2	1–0	4–0	3–0	1–1
Rochdale	4–0	6–1	2–0	2–1	3–1	4–1	2–4	0–3	1–1	3–4	4–1	5–0	0–0		1–2	2–2	2–0	3–1	2–1	2–1	5–4	4–2
Rotherham United	2–4	7–0	4–1	1–1	2–1	1–4	1–0	2–0	0–4	1–0	1–2	2–2	2–2	0–4		6–3	0–1	2–2	5–0	4–1	1–3	2–5
Southport	2–0	0–2	4–3	5–1	0–3	3–0	1–1	4–0	1–1	3–2	0–0	2–1	1–2	2–3	7–1		2–1	1–2	4–4	1–1	5–3	1–0
South Shields	2–2	2–0	5–2	3–1	1–0	3–3	2–1	1–0	3–5	3–1	2–1	1–2	0–0	2–2	5–0	4–0		2–3	1–5	2–2	1–1	4–1
Stockport County	1–0	5–0	7–1	1–0	2–3	4–0	3–0	6–0	5–1	1–1	6–1	2–0	4–2	4–2	6–1	2–2	2–0		3–1	1–1	0–1	2–3
Tranmere	2–2	5–2	3–0	1–2	1–2	3–0	2–1	3–3	7–1	0–1	2–3	3–1	1–5	2–2	5–4	3–1	3–0	2–0		3–0	2–1	4–4
Wigan Borough	2–1	2–0	8–0	2–1	2–2	3–2	3–2	2–1	1–3	4–1	2–0	5–0	0–3	3–1	1–1	1–1	1–1	0–1	0–2		2–1	0–2
Wrexham	0–1	3–0	3–3	1–1	1–0	2–2	0–2	2–1	3–5	3–1	5–1	2–1	0–2	8–0	1–0	1–2	1–3	1–1	2–0	2–1		1–1
York City	2–0	3–1	2–2	1–1	4–2	1–1	2–2	3–0	4–1	1–0	1–0	3–0	0–2	6–0	3–0	0–4	2–2	1–2	0–0	4–0	0–0	

Updated to match(es) played on unknown. Source: Ian Laschke: Rothmans Book of Football League Records 1888–89 to 1978–79. Macdonald and Jane’s, London & Sydney, 1980.
Legend: Blue = home team win; Yellow = draw; Red = away team win.

=== Maps ===
Locations of the Football League Third Division North teams

== Third Division South ==
Football League Third Division South
- Season: 1929–30
- Champions: Plymouth Argyle (1st title)
- Failed re-election: Merthyr Town
- Matches: 462
- Goals: 1,632 (3.53 per match)
- Top goalscorer: George Goddard (Queens Park Rangers), 37

Pos	Team	Pld	W	D	L	GF	GA	GAv	Pts	Promotion or relegation
1	Plymouth Argyle (C, P)	42	30	8	4	98	38	2.579	68	Promotion to the Second Division
2	Brentford	42	28	5	9	94	44	2.136	61	
3	Queens Park Rangers	42	21	9	12	80	68	1.176	51	
4	Northampton Town	42	21	8	13	82	58	1.414	50	
5	Brighton & Hove Albion	42	21	8	13	87	63	1.381	50	
6	Coventry City	42	19	9	14	88	73	1.205	47	
7	Fulham	42	18	11	13	87	83	1.048	47	
8	Norwich City	42	18	10	14	88	77	1.143	46	
9	Crystal Palace	42	17	12	13	81	74	1.095	46	
10	Bournemouth & Boscombe Athletic	42	15	13	14	72	61	1.180	43	
11	Southend United	42	15	13	14	69	59	1.169	43	
12	Clapton Orient	42	14	13	15	55	62	0.887	41	
13	Luton Town	42	14	12	16	64	78	0.821	40	
14	Swindon Town	42	13	12	17	73	83	0.880	38	
15	Watford	42	15	8	19	60	73	0.822	38	
16	Exeter City	42	12	11	19	67	73	0.918	35	
17	Walsall	42	13	8	21	71	78	0.910	34	
18	Newport County	42	12	10	20	74	85	0.871	34	
19	Torquay United	42	10	11	21	64	94	0.681	31	
20	Bristol Rovers	42	11	8	23	67	93	0.720	30	
21	Gillingham	42	11	8	23	51	80	0.638	30	Re-elected
22	Merthyr Town (R)	42	6	9	27	60	135	0.444	21	Failed re-election and demoted to the Southern League

(C) Champions; (P) Promoted; (R) Relegated

=== Results ===
Home \ Away	B&BA	BRE	B&HA	BRR	CLA	COV	CRY	EXE	FUL	GIL	LUT	MER	NPC	NOR	NWC	PLY	QPR	STD	SWI	TOR	WAL	WAT
Bournemouth & Boscombe Athletic		1–2	1–1	3–1	5–1	1–0	2–1	3–0	5–0	1–2	5–1	4–2	1–1	3–1	2–3	1–1	0–0	0–0	1–3	4–1	1–1	3–2
Brentford	1–0		5–2	2–1	3–1	3–1	2–0	2–0	5–1	2–1	2–0	6–0	1–0	2–0	3–0	3–0	3–0	2–1	3–2	5–0	6–2	5–0
Brighton & Hove Albion	4–3	2–0		1–0	1–0	1–1	1–2	1–1	5–0	2–0	4–1	4–1	3–2	2–1	6–3	0–1	2–3	1–0	3–0	5–0	4–0	2–1
Bristol Rovers	2–1	4–1	1–0		0–0	1–3	2–3	1–0	4–1	3–0	2–2	2–2	2–3	2–3	0–1	2–3	4–1	4–2	3–2	2–0	3–1	1–2
Clapton Orient	0–0	1–1	4–1	3–0		3–1	2–1	3–0	2–4	2–0	6–1	1–0	3–1	0–0	0–0	0–2	2–4	1–1	2–1	1–1	1–1	1–1
Coventry City	0–2	2–1	0–2	1–0	5–2		1–0	3–3	3–1	5–0	5–1	2–2	2–0	2–2	3–1	1–0	2–3	5–1	1–2	4–1	4–0	3–1
Crystal Palace	1–1	2–1	2–2	3–0	3–0	4–3		1–1	4–3	5–1	4–1	6–1	1–0	1–3	3–2	3–0	1–1	1–2	1–0	4–2	5–1	1–1
Exeter City	1–2	0–0	1–4	5–2	4–0	1–1	6–1		2–1	3–0	2–2	1–1	0–4	6–4	3–0	1–1	0–2	3–1	5–1	0–0	0–2	1–0
Fulham	3–3	2–0	5–1	6–2	2–2	2–0	1–1	2–2		2–1	1–1	5–4	2–1	1–0	3–3	1–3	0–2	2–2	4–1	1–0	3–2	6–1
Gillingham	1–5	1–3	2–2	3–3	2–0	0–3	1–1	2–0	0–1		2–0	6–0	5–0	5–2	1–2	0–0	3–1	1–0	0–0	0–2	2–1	1–2
Luton Town	1–0	2–1	1–0	3–0	1–2	1–1	2–2	0–4	4–1	2–0		4–0	4–2	1–0	1–1	5–2	2–1	0–3	1–1	3–1	2–3	2–0
Merthyr Town	0–1	2–3	2–8	1–1	0–1	2–2	5–2	0–2	3–4	1–1	3–1		5–1	1–0	1–5	0–3	1–4	2–2	3–3	3–0	2–3	2–2
Newport County	1–1	1–3	2–2	2–2	0–0	4–2	0–0	4–1	1–1	5–1	0–0	10–0		2–1	4–4	0–2	4–5	0–0	2–1	2–1	3–2	1–0
Northampton Town	2–0	1–1	1–3	6–1	3–0	2–2	2–0	2–2	3–1	3–1	4–1	2–0	2–0		4–0	1–1	2–1	5–1	3–3	2–2	1–0	2–0
Norwich City	1–0	2–2	2–0	4–2	1–0	10–2	2–2	3–1	0–4	2–0	1–1	5–1	4–1	4–3		1–2	3–0	1–1	1–5	2–0	3–0	3–1
Plymouth Argyle	2–1	1–1	1–1	3–0	3–0	3–0	6–1	4–1	3–1	3–0	6–1	2–1	3–1	1–0	4–1		4–0	1–0	5–0	5–0	1–1	2–1
Queens Park Rangers	3–1	2–1	3–1	2–1	1–1	3–1	4–1	2–0	0–0	2–1	1–0	2–0	4–1	0–2	3–2	1–2		2–5	8–3	1–1	2–2	0–0
Southend	4–1	2–0	0–0	6–0	4–1	1–2	3–2	1–0	1–2	0–0	1–1	6–0	2–1	1–2	1–1	1–1	1–0		3–1	1–1	1–0	1–3
Swindon Town	1–1	0–2	0–1	2–2	0–0	1–1	3–1	1–0	1–1	3–0	1–1	6–3	5–1	2–0	2–1	1–2	2–2	5–1		2–1	3–1	1–3
Torquay United	7–0	2–1	5–2	2–1	0–5	1–3	2–2	2–1	2–4	1–1	2–2	4–0	3–2	0–1	2–2	3–4	1–3	1–1	1–1		5–2	4–0
Walsall	2–2	1–2	2–0	0–0	0–1	3–2	0–0	5–2	2–2	1–2	1–0	6–0	2–1	1–2	1–0	1–3	4–0	1–3	4–0	7–0		1–2
Watford	0–0	1–2	3–0	4–3	3–0	1–3	1–1	2–1	0–0	4–1	0–4	2–3	2–3	1–2	2–1	0–2	1–1	2–1	4–1	2–0	2–1	

Updated to match(es) played on unknown. Source: Ian Laschke: Rothmans Book of Football League Records 1888–89 to 1978–79. Macdonald and Jane’s, London & Sydney, 1980.
Legend: Blue = home team win; Yellow = draw; Red = away team win.

=== Maps ===
Locations of the Football League Third Division South London teams
Locations of the Football League Third Division South teams

== Attendances ==
=== Division One ===
No.	Club	Average	Highest	Lowest
1	Arsenal FC	35,537	49,433	18,082
2	Manchester City FC	33,339	68,704	10,907
3	Everton FC	32,989	52,600	15,946
4	Newcastle United FC	32,559	49,304	16,974
5	Liverpool FC	30,219	45,287	15,210
6	Aston Villa FC	27,726	41,919	8,965
7	Sheffield Wednesday FC	25,588	54,459	9,310
8	Sunderland AFC	24,553	58,519	8,909
9	Leicester City FC	21,344	35,644	13,156
10	Birmingham City FC	20,398	35,682	10,901
11	West Ham United FC	20,127	31,268	12,092
12	Leeds United FC	19,916	40,789	3,590
13	Sheffield United FC	19,711	47,039	7,987
14	Middlesbrough FC	19,172	40,538	5,370
15	Blackburn Rovers FC	18,714	25,591	8,544
16	Manchester United	18,599	57,201	5,656
17	Portsmouth FC	18,495	28,687	11,245
18	Bolton Wanderers FC	18,047	42,543	6,990
19	Derby County FC	15,977	30,307	9,102
20	Huddersfield Town AFC	15,767	28,287	5,182
21	Burnley FC	14,726	27,515	6,640
22	Grimsby Town FC	14,724	22,390	9,337

== See also ==
- 1929-30 in English football
- 1929 in association football
- 1930 in association football
