= Thomas McGhee =

English footballer (1929–2018)

Tommy McGhee
Personal information
- Full name: Thomas Edward McGhee
- Date of birth: 10 May 1929
- Place of birth: Manchester, England
- Date of death: 19 May 2018 (aged 89)
- Place of death: Portsmouth, England
- Position: Full back

Youth career
- Wealdstone

Senior career*
Years	Team	Apps	(Gls)
1954–1959	Portsmouth	136	(0)
1959–1960	Reading	8	(0)
- Poole Town
- Fareham Town
- * Club domestic league appearances and goals

Thomas Edward McGhee (10 May 1929 – 19 May 2018) was an English footballer best known for his spell at Portsmouth FC during the 1950s, making 136 appearances which gained him England recognition at Amateur and 'B' level.

== Football career ==
=== Early years ===
Early in his boyhood, McGhee caught the football bug when going to watch his uncle play in the Manchester Amateur League. At the age of twelve he started taking a serious interest in playing when he became a permanent member of the St. Teresa's School team. He later spent two years at the Stretford Technical College, opposite Lancashire County Cricket Club's ground and about half a mile from Old Trafford.

He took part in locally organised coaches – one week to Manchester United and the next to Manchester City. McGhee favoured the latter, and when he went to Maine Road he'd watch Albert Emptage and Frank Swift.

=== Early career ===
Towards the end of the war, McGhee started playing senior amateur football. He joined the Fleet Air Arm for a seven-year term in November 1946, but due to training, did not play for the first six months. Just one year later that all changed. He was stationed in Scotland and Service Football started to shape his future.

He regularly played for the Air Command and in 1952, he began playing for the Navy in the Inter-Service Championships which was usually won by the Army or the RAF who were able to field a host of professionals such as Ron Flowers of Wolves, Eddie Firmani of Charlton Athletic, and Jackie Henderson and Gordon Dale both of Portsmouth FC.

=== Portsmouth ===
In 1952, McGhee signed amateur forms with Portsmouth and at the same time joined Wealdstone FC, in North London. In that season, Wealdstone won the Athenian League championship for the first time in their history. McGhee signed for Portsmouth in May 1954. McGhee had previously been on the club's books as an amateur, but this had been allowed to lapse.

Portsmouth's manager Eddie Lever was impressed with the full back when he turned out for a senior service side against a FA eleven on 31 December 1953. He kept a keen eye on the player for several months. In May 1954, Lever, knowing that McGhee was being sought after by tops clubs including Tottenham Hotspur, was tipped off that the 25-year-old Petty Officer was on Portsmouth Harbour about to leave for his home in Manchester. The Pompey manager jumped into a taxi and arrived just before the train pulled out and signed him on professional forms for the club.

McGhee's Pompey career began in the reserve team, but in November he was handed his senior debut at home to Everton which Portsmouth won 5–0. He made tremendous progress, forging a very successful full-back partnership with Jack Mansell and he played in every remaining fixture of the 1954–55 season which saw Pompey finish 3rd in Division 1.

Tommy McGhee only missed two games throughout the next term. McGhee remained at Fratton Park for three more seasons, leaving for Reading F.C. in 1959 after Pompey had been relegated to Division 2.

=== Reading ===
In July 1959, McGhee had a short spell at Reading F.C. where, after making his home debut against Port Vale, a series of injuries restricted him to nine Division 3 appearances.

=== Poole Town and Fareham Town ===
In the 1960s, McGhee played non-league football for Poole Town and Fareham Town.

== International career ==
McGhee's part in Wealdstone's success was recognised and in 1953–54, he won three England Amateur international caps.

In the 1955–56 season, McGhee's performances led to him being picked to play in an England 'B' international.

== Personal life & death ==
McGhee enjoyed his retirement in the Portsmouth area and was a season ticket holder at Portsmouth FC until his death. McGhee died in May 2018.
