= For No One =

1966 song by the Beatles

- Cover of the Northern Songs sheet music (licensed to Sonora Musikförlag)

Song by the Beatles

from the album Revolver
- Released: 5 August 1966
- Recorded: 9, 16 and 19 May 1966
- Studio: EMI, London
- Genre: Baroque pop
- Length: 2:00
- Label: Parlophone
- Songwriter: Lennon–McCartney
- Producer: George Martin

"For No One" is a song by the English rock band the Beatles from their 1966 album Revolver. It was written by Paul McCartney, and credited to Lennon–McCartney. An early example of baroque pop drawing on both baroque music and nineteenth-century art song, it describes the end of a romantic relationship. Mostly performed by McCartney, the track is distinguished by its French horn line performed by Alan Civil, played first as a solo and then as counterpoint in the final verse. It was considered one of McCartney's most mature compositions to date on its release.

== Writing and recording ==
McCartney recalls writing "For No One" in the bathroom of a ski resort in the Swiss Alps while on holiday with his then girlfriend Jane Asher. In his book The Lyrics: 1956 to the Present (2021), McCartney said that the song is "about rejection": "I'm talking about two people who've broken up, but obviously, as with any writer, it all comes from your own experience, and inevitably you're talking about yourself." The lyrics end enigmatically with the line "A love that should have lasted years". The song's working title was "Why Did It Die?" The composition is built on a descending scale progression in B major with a refrain that modulates to C-sharp minor.

The song was recorded on 9, 16 and 19 May 1966. McCartney sang and played clavichord (rented from George Martin's AIR company), piano and bass guitar, while Ringo Starr played drums, tambourine and maracas. Neither John Lennon nor George Harrison contributed to the recording.

The French horn solo was by Alan Civil, a British horn player described by recording engineer Geoff Emerick as the "best horn player in London". During the session, McCartney pushed Civil to play a note that was beyond the usual range of the instrument. According to Emerick, the result was the "performance of his life". Civil said that the song was "recorded in rather bad musical style, in that it was 'in the cracks' [not in concert pitch], neither B-flat nor B-major. This posed a certain difficulty in tuning my instrument." Civil is one of the few session musicians to receive credit on a Beatles album.

== Reception ==
In her contemporaneous review of Revolver, for The Evening Standard, Maureen Cleave highlighted "For No One" among McCartney's contributions and deemed it "as moving as 'Yesterday'".

Thomas Ward of AllMusic describes "For No One" as "one of Paul McCartney's great ballads with the Beatles", adding that it is "a simply beautiful song, full of idiosyncratic McCartney touches yet undeniably inspired". Ward praises McCartney's vocal performance and calls the song's melody "one of the most inspired of the singer's whole career". Ward also admires the bass line and French horn solo, and concludes his review by calling the song "one of the most delicate and fine ballads of the Beatles' entire canon".

Rob Sheffield of Rolling Stone writes that McCartney's songs on Revolver "[had] a new caustic realism". He calls "For No One" the "ultimate 'you stay home, she goes out' break-up song". Lennon called the song "one of [his] favourites of [McCartney's]" and "a nice piece of work."

Elvis Costello named it his favourite Beatles song, stating in an interview, "'For No One' is everything that's great about Paul McCartney in one song ... It's a really beautiful melody. He's like a fantastic movie actor who doesn't do anything. He doesn't over-dramatize." Costello went on to call it McCartney's best lyric and lauded the song's arrangement, concluding, "It's about as perfect a record as you could make."

== Personnel ==
According to Ian MacDonald, except where noted:

The Beatles

- Paul McCartney – vocals, bass, piano, clavichord
- Ringo Starr – drums, tambourine, maracas

Additional musician

- Alan Civil – French horn
