= Vivien Felton =

English footballer

Personal information
- Full name: Vivien Edward Felton
- Date of birth: 13 August 1929
- Place of birth: Southgate, England
- Date of death: 13 October 2005 (aged 76)
- Place of death: Enfield, England
- Position: Left-half

Senior career*
| Years | Team | Apps | (Gls) |
- Southgate Athletic
- Barnet
| 1954–1956 | Crystal Palace | 2 | (0) |
- Tonbridge
- Tunbridge Wells United
- * Club domestic league appearances and goals

Vivien Edward Felton (13 August 1929 — 13 October 2005) was an English footballer who played as a left-half.

== Career ==
Felton began his career with local club Southgate Athletic, before moving across north London to sign for Barnet. In 1954, Felton signed for Crystal Palace, making two league appearances over the course of two years, before returning to non-League football to sign for Tonbridge. Following his time at Tonbridge, Felton signed for Tunbridge Wells United.
