= David Proctor (footballer, born 1929) =

Northern Ireland footballer

Personal information
- Date of birth: 10 October 1929
- Place of birth: Belfast, Northern Ireland
- Date of death: September 2011 (aged 81)
- Place of death: Belfast, Northern Ireland
- Position: Right half

Youth career
- Portadown

Senior career*
Years	Team	Apps	(Gls)
1949–1952	Blackpool	0	(0)
1952–1954	Norwich City	17	(0)
1954	Northwich Victoria		
1954–1959	Barrow	160	(2)
1959–1960	Wrexham	2	(0)
- * Club domestic league appearances and goals

David Proctor (10 October 1929 – September 2011) was a Northern Irish former footballer who made English football league appearances with Norwich City, Barrow and Wrexham.

== Career ==
Proctor started out as a youth at Northern Irish club Portadown before being signed by Blackpool in 1949.

He would then move to Norwich City, before a short stint with Northwich Victoria.

In 1954 he signed for Barrow, where he was made Captain and he made 160 league appearances in 5 years, before moving to Welsh club Wrexham.
