= Luciano Panetti =

Italian footballer

Personal information
- Date of birth: 13 July 1929
- Place of birth: Porto Recanati, Italy
- Date of death: 26 December 2016 (aged 87)
- Place of death: Civitanova Marche, Italy
- Height: 1.82 m (5 ft 11 1/2 in)
- Position: Goalkeeper

Senior career*
| Years | Team | Apps | (Gls) |
| 1949–1952 | Jesi | | |
| 1952–1955 | Modena | 88 | (0) |
| 1955–1961 | Roma | 147 | (0) |
| 1961–1962 | Torino | 21 | (0) |
| Total | | 256 | (0) |
- * Club domestic league appearances and goals

Luciano Panetti (13 July 1929 – 26 December 2016) was an Italian professional footballer who played as a goalkeeper.

== Career ==
Throughout his career, Panetti played for 7 seasons (168 games) in the Italian Serie A for A.S. Roma and Torino F.C.

== Honours ==
Roma

- Inter-Cities Fairs Cup winner: 1960–61.
