= Tristan Jones =

British mariner and author

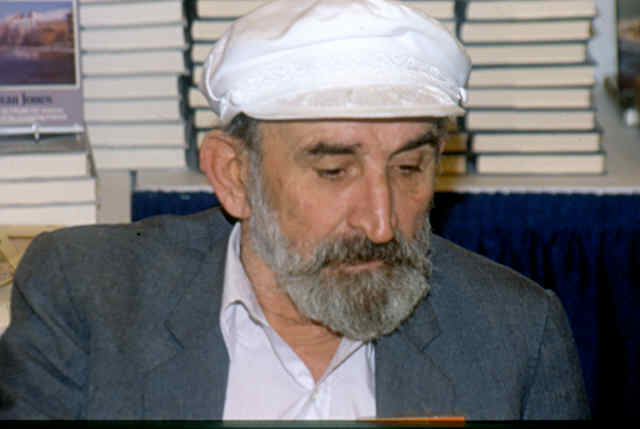
Tristan Jones at book signing, Annapolis Sailboat Show 1987

Arthur Jones, pen name Tristan Jones (8 May 1924 – 21 June 1995) was a British mariner and author. He spent most of his life at sea, first in the British Royal Navy, and then sailing in small yachts for various purposes, including self-appointed adventure trips. Starting in 1977, he wrote sixteen books and many articles about sailing and his adventures, including several memoirs. His writing, while highly entertaining, often mixes fact and fiction. In his memoirs, he invented a fictional childhood and youth.

== Early life ==
Tristan Jones, whose real name was Arthur Jones, was born in 1929 in Liverpool. He was the illegitimate son of a working-class girl, and was brought up mainly in orphanages, with little real education. He joined the Royal Navy in 1946, after the end of World War II, and served for 14 years.

Then he bought a sailboat, tried whiskey smuggling, and scraped a living sailing the Mediterranean Sea. He taught himself to write, and sold articles to yachting magazines.

== The Incredible Voyage ==
In the early 1970s, he conceived the idea of setting "the altitude record for sailing" by sailing both the Dead Sea (the lowest open water in the world) and Lake Titicaca, which is 3,812 meters (12,507 ft) up in the Andes Mountains. He sailed to Israel, and trucked his sailboat to the Dead Sea. Though he was not allowed to launch his boat, he did make a brief sail on the Sea in an Israeli naval officer's sailboat.

He then sailed his boat from Israel around Africa to the West Indies, where he traded it for a smaller boat. He sailed this boat to Peru, trucked it up to Lake Titicaca, and sailed the lake, thus achieving the "record". He then hauled his sailboat across Bolivia to Brazil on the Paraguay River, and sailed down through the Mato Grosso to Paraguay and Argentina.

His account of this adventure was published in 1977 as his first book, The Incredible Voyage.

== Writing career and "reinvention" ==
Jones wrote The Incredible Voyage while living in Greenwich Village in New York City. It was a success, and he soon wrote several more books.

According to Anthony Dalton's account, "Then came a midlife sea change. Arthur Jones looked into his future, imagined greatness, and began to claw his way to it. Having taught himself to sail, he taught himself to write. He was a natural at both. As Tristan Jones, in his mid-forties, he sailed out of Brazil's Mato Grosso and into a Greenwich Village apartment to write six books in three years and reinvent his past."

In his imagined past, he was born at sea, on his father's tramp freighter off Tristan da Cunha in 1924 (thus the name "Tristan"), left school at 14 to work on sailing barges (A Steady Trade), and served as a boy seaman in the Royal Navy during World War II (Heart of Oak).

While his account of war service is entertaining, Jones has been compared to a 'rum gagger' (19th century British slang for a man who got money or drinks by telling fraudulent tales of supposed suffering at sea).

Besides the two volumes of autobiography, he wrote five volumes of entertaining (if unreliable) memoirs of his sailing adventures: Ice! (1978), Saga of a Wayward Sailor (1979), Dutch Treat (1979), Adrift (1980), and Aka (1981).

"Tristan" Jones became a noted personality in the sailing community. In 1982, he published One Hand for Yourself, One for the Ship: The Essentials of Single Handed Sailing.

== Later life ==
His left leg was amputated in 1982, due to health problems and accidents. Despite this, he resumed sailing, to inspire other people with disabilities. He sailed the trimaran Outward Leg from San Diego to London by way of Colombia, Panama, and New York City; the story of this voyage was told in his book Outward Leg. He then continued across central Europe by river and canal to the Black Sea, as told in The Improbable Voyage, and then around southern Asia to Thailand, as recounted in Somewheres East of Suez.

In 1991, he also lost his right leg, and became depressed, although he returned briefly to sea.

He settled in Phuket, Thailand for the last ten years of his life, converted to Islam, and took the name 'Ali'. Though he seems not to have informed all his older friends of this, he signed his name as 'Ali' in correspondence with Rafiq A. Tschannen, a Swiss Muslim living in Bangkok. The change is also confirmed in Dalton's biography.

The cause of death was complications after a stroke, according to the Associated Press.

== Films about Tristan Jones ==
- Tristan Jones: the Psychology of Adventure (1990)
- The Incredible Tristan Jones (1990)

A few years after his voyage from San Diego to Thailand, Jones visited New York, and spoke about his travels at the New York Open Center. This talk was recorded, and has been released as a videotape and DVD, titled Tristan Jones: the Psychology of Adventure. Later, the producers of The Psychology of Adventure sat down with Jones at a pub in Greenwich Village for a videotaped interview, which became The Incredible Tristan Jones.

== Books by Tristan Jones ==
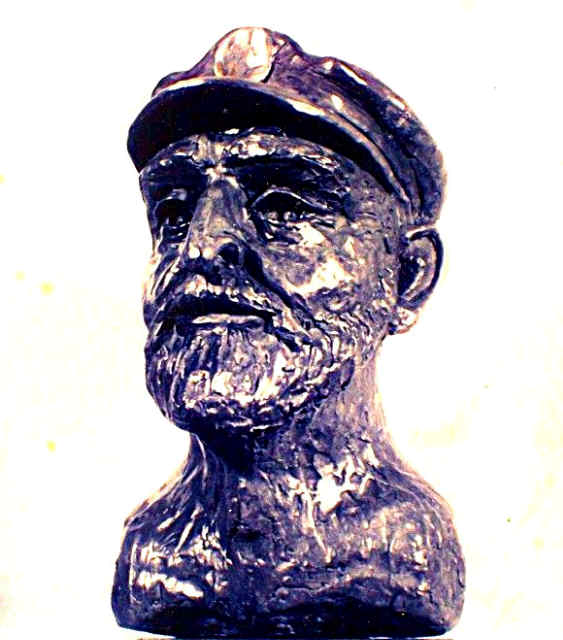
Bronze portrait bust of Tristan Jones, sculpted from life, by William Barth Osmundsen during the 1987 Annapolis Sailboat Show. Bronze cast in 1988.

- The Incredible Voyage (1977)
- Ice! (1978)
- Saga of a Wayward Sailor (1979)
- Dutch Treat (1979)
- Adrift (1980)
- Aka (1981)
- A Steady Trade: A Boyhood at Sea (1982)
- One Hand for Yourself, One for the Ship: The Essentials of Single Handed Sailing (1982)
- Yarns (1983)
- Heart of Oak (1984)
- Outward Leg (1985)
- The Improbable Voyage (1986)
- Somewheres East of Suez (1988)
- Seagulls in My Soup (1991)
- To Venture Further (1991)
- Encounters of a Wayward Sailor (1995)
