= Carriega =

Spanish football player and coach (1929–2018)

Personal information
- Full name: Luis Cid Pérez
- Date of birth: 9 December 1929
- Place of birth: Allariz, Spain
- Date of death: 13 February 2018 (aged 88)
- Place of death: Allariz, Spain
- Height: 1.68 m (5 ft 6 in)
- Position: Forward

Senior career*
Years	Team	Apps	(Gls)
1949–1952	Orensana	65	(13)
1952–1954	Racing de Ferrol	42	(14)
1954–1956	Oviedo	11	(1)
1956–1957	Burgos	34	(6)
1957–1958	Cartagena		

Managerial career
- 1961–1963: Cartagena
- 1965–1966: Europa
- 1966–1968: Langreo
- 1968–1972: Real Gijón
- 1972–1976: Zaragoza
- 1976–1979: Sevilla
- 1979–1981: Real Betis
- 1981: Atlético Madrid
- 1982–1983: Elche
- 1985–1986: Real Betis
- 1986–1987: Figueres
- 1989–1990: Orense
- * Club domestic league appearances and goals

Luis Cid Pérez, known as Carriega (9 December 1929 – 13 February 2018) was a Spanish professional football coach and player. He managed a number of club sides including Sporting de Gijón, Real Zaragoza, Sevilla, Real Betis, Atlético Madrid and UE Figueres.
