= Gertrude Keightley =

- Born: Gertrude Emily Smith c. 1864
- Died: 30 October 1929 (aged 65); Drum House, Drumbeg, Lisburn

Lady Gertrude Keightley (c. 1864 - 30 October 1929) was an Irish local government and charity official, and the first woman magistrate to be appointed in County Antrim.

== Biography ==
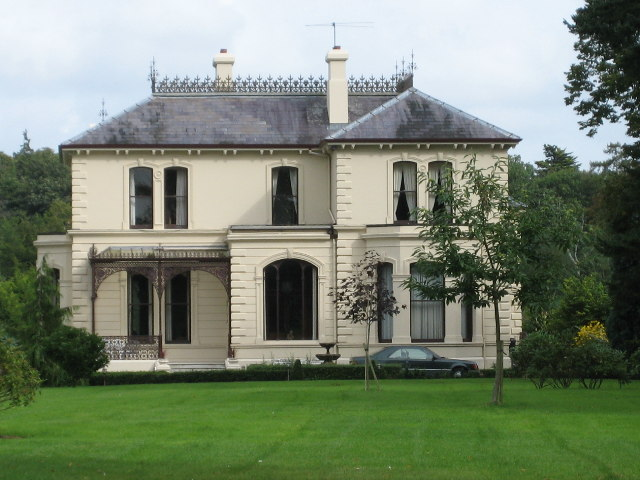
Drum House, seen in 2005

Gertrude Emily Keightley was the younger daughter of Henry Smith of Northampton. She married the barrister, politician, and author, Samuel Robert Keightley of Lisburn, in 1892. They had two sons and two daughters, Maurice, Katherine, Patricia, and Philip Charles Russell. The couple first lived at Fort House, Lisburn, and later Drum House, Drumbeg.

She was elected to the Lisburn board of guardians in 1896, only three years after the law was changed to allow women to serve on these boards. She served on this board until her death in 1929, and was the chair from 1913 to 1920. Like many other women who sat on these boards, Keightley sat on a number of sub-committees dealing with female staff, schools, clothing and workhouse visiting which were deemed suitable for women to oversee. She was the only woman on this board from 1900 to 1906, and during this time was in charge of supervising the "boarded-out" or fostered workhouse children. This work when combined with raising her own children, was a difficult task and led to her offering to resign from the board in 1905, a suggestion that was rebuffed. It was through her work with fostering children that led her to work with child emigration schemes as well.

Keightley was among those responsible for the extension of legislation to Ireland in 1911 which facilitated the fostering of children whose parents were found to be "physically or morally unfit" rather than just those children who were orphaned or deserted. She ran unsuccessfully in the 1920 Hillsborough rural district council, possibly due to her husband's liberal politics. Around this time she was a prominent member of the National Society for the Prevention of Cruelty to Children and chaired the maternity and child welfare committee of Lisburn urban district council. She was a member of the board of governors of Lisburn and Hillsborough district hospital as well as the vice-chairman of Lisburn employment committee. She became a Lady after her husband received a knighthood in 1912.

Keightley became the first woman magistrate to be appointed in County Antrim in 1925 when she became a justice of the peace. She had always suffered with poor health, declining in her later years, but remained active in her chosen causes. She died aged 65 at home at Drum House, on 30 October 1929 after a long illness. One of her eulogists described her "as possessing a self-sacrificing sense of public duty." Her husband claimed that her days spent working on poor law where her happiest and most productive days.
