= Southgate Athletic F.C. =

Southgate Athletic
- Full name: Southgate Athletic Football Club
- Founded: 1948
- Dissolved: 1997
- Ground: Tottenhall Sports Ground, Palmers Green
- Final season; 1996–97: Middlesex County League Premier Division, 12th of 12

Southgate Athletic Football Club was a football club based in Palmers Green, England.

== History ==
Founded in May 1948 as Southgate Estate Athletic, entering the Wood Green & Southgate League. In 1951–52, the club entered the Northern Suburban Intermediate League, winning Division One. In 1962, the club dropped the "Estate" in their name, becoming Southgate Athletic. In 1971, Southgate joined the reserve section of the Metropolitan–London League, winning Division Two in their first season. Following a merger of the Metropolitan–London League and the Spartan League, Southgate became members of the intermediate section of the London Spartan League in 1975. Ahead of the 1985–86 season, Southgate were granted senior status, being promoted to the Premier Division in the same season. In 1987, the club entered the FA Vase for the first time, reaching the third round, before being knocked out by Northampton Spencer after a replay. In 1994, Southgate dropped down to the Middlesex County League. The club dissolved in 1997, after finishing bottom of the Middlesex County League Premier Division.

== Ground ==
For the majority of the club's history, Southgate played at Tottenhall Sports Ground in Palmers Green. Before moving to Tottenhall Sports Ground, the club played at Bramley Sports Ground and Oakwood Park in Southgate.

== Records ==
- Best FA Vase performance: Third round, 1987–88
