= John Jackson (businessman) =

English businessman

- Born: John Bernard Haysom Jackson; 26 May 1929 (age 97); Devon, England
- Education: University of Cambridge
- Organization: Mishcon de Reya

John Bernard Haysom Jackson (born 26 May 1929) is an author and campaigner, a current chairman at the solicitors firm Mishcon de Reya, and a former chairman of the Countryside Alliance. Qualifying as a barrister in 1954, he had a career in business and the technology industries during the 60s, 70s and 80s: most notably with technology company Philips. From the 90s onwards he moved into democratic and constitutional advocacy, particularly through the Countryside Alliance, OpenDemocracy.net and Unlock Democracy.

== Early life and family ==
Jackson was born in Devon in 1929, where he lives now. His family moved to the Dorset coast for several years, and then to London as his father found work during the Great Depression years of the 1930s. He was educated at The King's School, Canterbury, and from there he went on to the University of Cambridge to read law as the Squire Scholar in 1949, before qualifying in 1954.

Jackson has three children, five grandchildren and two great grandchildren, and has been married twice. He spent much of his married life in Kent, continuing the self-sufficient lifestyle he learnt as a child.

== Career ==
Over the last 60 years Jackson has been engaged in a number of industries, holding chairmanships or directorships in Philips, Ladbroke Group (later Hilton Group plc, of which he became non-executive chairman in 1994), BHP, Graseby, Instore, Celltech, WPP, Wyndham Press and in the Oxford Technology Venture Capital Trusts. He was appointed non-solicitor Chairman of London law firm Mishcon de Reya., in 1992

Jackson has also become increasingly involved in political and constitutional debates, initially through campaigning with the Countryside Alliance, and later by contributing to public discussions and writing articles.

== Publishing ==
John Jackson's first book, A Bucket of Nuts and a Herring Net was published in 1979 (Collins and Harvill Press). It was an account of family life on a small-holding in rural Kent, and of self-sufficiency. The book was reprinted with a new introduction and an end piece in 2000, as A Little Piece of England: A Tale of Self-Sufficiency by Merlin Unwin Books.

Jackson's independent publishing venture JJ Books was launched in 2011, with the aim of JJ Books reissued A Little Piece of England in July 2011. In October 2011, the company published the hardback edition of "Tales for Great Grandchildren", a collection of fables and mythological tales that Jackson gathered during his travels in Nepal in 1978.

The company plans to publish several new collections of stories (in illustrated hardback and digital editions).
