= Ron Phoenix =

English footballer (1929–2021)

Personal information
- Full name: Ronald James Phoenix
- Date of birth: 30 June 1929
- Place of birth: Stretford, England
- Date of death: 10 March 2021 (aged 91)
- Position: Wing half

Youth career
- Humphrey Park

Senior career*
Years	Team	Apps	(Gls)
1951–1960	Manchester City	53	(2)
1960–1962	Rochdale	64	(0)
- Altrincham
Total		117	(2)
- * Club domestic league appearances and goals

Ronald James Phoenix (30 June 1929 – March 2021) was an English footballer who played as a wing half in the Football League for Manchester City and Rochdale.

In May 2019, Phoenix resided in a care home in Trafford, Greater Manchester.

His death was announced on 10 March 2021. He was 91.
