= Dennis Pell =

English footballer (1929–2003)

Personal information
- Date of birth: 19 April 1929
- Place of birth: Normanton, West Yorkshire, England
- Date of death: 2003 (aged 73–74)
- Height: 5 ft 11 in (1.80 m)
- Position: Winger

Senior career*
Years	Team	Apps	(Gls)
1951–1952	Methley		
1952–1955	Rotherham United	11	(3)
1955–1957	Grimsby Town	3	(1)
1957–19??	Frickley Colliery		
- * Club domestic league appearances and goals

Dennis Pell (19 April 1929 – 2003) was an English professional footballer who played as a winger.
