= Maurice Handford =

British horn player and conductor

Maurice James Handford (29 April 1928 – 16 December 1986) was a British horn player and conductor.

Handford was born in Salisbury. He was principal horn of the Hallé Orchestra from 1949 to 1961, then associate conductor 1966–71, and staff conductor. He died in Warminster.
