= Gordon Dale =

English footballer

Personal information
- Full name: Gordon Dale
- Date of birth: 28 May 1928
- Place of birth: Worksop, England
- Date of death: 14 March 1996 (aged 67)
- Place of death: Portsmouth, England
- Position: Left winger

Senior career*
Years	Team	Apps	(Gls)
- Worksop Town
1948–1951	Chesterfield	92	(3)
1951–1957	Portsmouth	114	(18)
1957–1961	Exeter City	124	(8)
1961–1962	Chelmsford City	25	(1)
1962–1963	Newport County		
- Crawley Town
- * Club domestic league appearances and goals

Gordon Dale (20 May 1928 — 14 March 1996) was an English footballer who played as a left winger.

== Career ==
Upon leaving school, Dale signed for hometown club Worksop Town. In February 1948, Chesterfield signed Dale for £500. On 12 March 1949, after spending time in Chesterfield's reserves, Dale made his debut for the club in a 2–1 defeat against Fulham.

On 27 June 1951, following Chesterfield's relegation from the 1950–51 Second Division, First Division side Portsmouth signed Dale for £20,000, becoming Portsmouth's record transfer fee at the time, as well as Chesterfield's record outgoing transfer. Dale only made eight appearances during his first season with Portsmouth, due to injuries. In the 1954–55 season, Dale appeared in more than half of Portsmouth's fixtures for the first time in his career with the club.

On 25 October 1957, Dale signed for Exeter City for a fee of £5,000. A day after signing, Dale made his debut for Exeter in a 2–1 loss away to Bournemouth & Boscombe Athletic. Dale's time at Exeter was a "success", scoring 8 goals in 124 league appearances for the club. In July 1961, Dale signed for Southern League club Chelmsford City. After a season at Chelmsford, Dale signed for Newport County in October 1962. In October 1963, following a successful trial, Dale joined Crawley Town.
