= Brian Woodward (footballer) =

English footballer (1929–2014)

Personal information
- Full name: Brian Woodward
- Date of birth: 12 July 1929
- Place of birth: Leeds, West Riding of Yorkshire, England
- Date of death: 11 October 2014 (aged 85)
- Height: 5 ft 9 1/2 in (1.77 m)
- Position: Striker

Senior career*
Years	Team	Apps	(Gls)
1947–1949	Leeds United	0	(0)
1949–1950	Hereford United		
1950–1951	York City	5	(0)
Total		5	(0)
- * Club domestic league appearances and goals

Brian Woodward (12 July 1929 – 11 October 2014) was an English professional footballer who played as a striker in the Football League for York City, in non-League football for Hereford United and was on the books of Leeds United without making a league appearance.
