= Kevin Wood (footballer) =

English footballer

Personal information
- Full name: Kevin Wood
- Date of birth: 3 November 1929
- Place of birth: Armthorpe, England
- Date of death: 19 September 2012 (aged 82)
- Place of death: Doncaster, England
- Position: Inside forward

Senior career*
Years	Team	Apps	(Gls)
1949–1950	Doncaster Rovers	0	(0)
1950–1951	Worksop Town		
1951–1952	Grimsby Town	3	(2)
1952–1954	Peterborough United	9	(3)
- * Club domestic league appearances and goals

Kevin Wood (3 November 1929 – 19 September 2012) was an English professional footballer who played as an inside forward in the Football League for Grimsby Town. He was on the books of Doncaster Rovers, without playing league football for them, and played non-league football for Worksop Town and Peterborough United.
