= Colin Walker (footballer, born 1929) =

English footballer

Personal information
- Date of birth: 7 July 1929
- Place of birth: Stapleford, England
- Date of death: November 2017 (aged 88)
- Place of death: Stapleford, England
- Position: Wing half

Senior career*
Years	Team	Apps	(Gls)
1946–1954	Derby County	25	(0)
- Gresley Rovers
- * Club domestic league appearances and goals

Colin Walker (7 July 1929 – November 2017) was an English footballer. He was born in Stapleford, England.

== Career ==
Walker started his career with Derby County in October 1946. He went on to play for Gresley Rovers.
