= Alan Civil =

English French horn player (1929–1989)

Alan Civil OBE
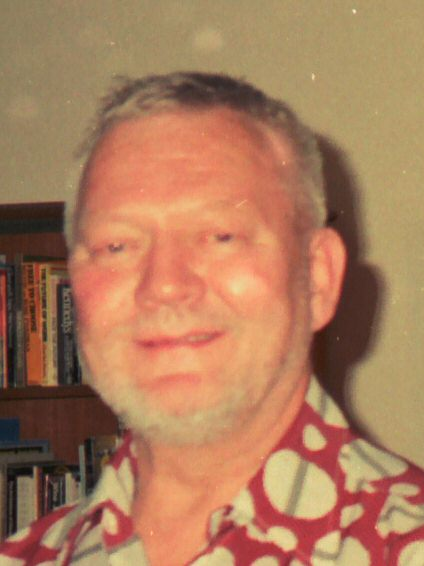
- Civil in Hong Kong, 1987
- Born: 13 June 1929; Northampton, Northamptonshire, England
- Died: 19 March 1989 (aged 59); Lambeth, London, England
- Occupation: Musician
- Known for: French horn

Alan Civil (13 June 1929 – 19 March 1989) was an English French horn player.

Civil began to play the horn at a young age and joined the famous Royal Artillery Band and Orchestra at Woolwich while still in his teens. He studied the instrument under Aubrey Brain, father of Dennis Brain, in 1943 and later with Willy von Stemm in Hamburg.

Civil was engaged by Thomas Beecham to play second horn to Dennis Brain in the Royal Philharmonic Orchestra, and when Brain left for the Philharmonia, Civil took over leadership of the section. In 1955, Civil joined the Philharmonia himself, becoming principal horn player when Brain died in a car crash in 1957.

In the 1960s, Civil became the first non-German to be approached by the Berlin Philharmonic Orchestra to become a member. Civil stuck with the Philharmonia however, who were reshaping themselves into the New Philharmonia. In 1966 he became principal horn of the BBC Symphony Orchestra, remaining there until his retirement in 1988.

As a soloist, Civil recorded the horn concertos of Mozart (with the Philharmonia, under Otto Klemperer, 1960). His recording of Benjamin Britten's Serenade for Tenor, Horn and Strings with Robert Tear is quite well known. He also played chamber music in the Alan Civil Horn Trio.

As well as his work in classical music, Civil played the horn solo on The Beatles' song "For No One" from the album Revolver and was one of only five session musicians to get a named credit on a Beatles recording. Civil was also part of the orchestra crescendo in the song "A Day in the Life" from the album Sgt. Pepper's Lonely Hearts Club Band. Civil taught at the Royal College of Music. Among his pupils was Timothy Brown. He was appointed President of the British Horn Society in 1979 and was awarded an OBE in 1985.

Civil died of liver and kidney failure on 19 March 1989 at King's College Hospital in London. He was 59 years old.
