= Frank Lynn (footballer) =

English footballer

Personal information
- Full name: Francis Lynn
- Date of birth: 29 May 1929
- Place of birth: Consett, England
- Date of death: 2011 (aged 81–82)
- Position: Winger

Senior career*
Years	Team	Apps	(Gls)
1946–1947	Blackhall Colliery Welfare		
1947–1951	Grimsby Town	2	(0)
- * Club domestic league appearances and goals

Francis Lynn (19 May 1929 – 2011) was an English professional footballer who played as a winger.
