= Emily Robin =

British bordello owner

Emily Robin (1874 – 29 October 1929), also known as Lady Emily Robin or Madam Robin, was an infamous British bordello owner at the beginning of the 20th century.

== Biography ==
In 1898 she started a brothel in Hull, England, called "Gamine". It became one of the most notorious cat-houses in Western Europe, primarily for its large occupancy and the (relatively) high prices that were charged.

Robin insisted on being referred to, at least by her girls and customers, as Lady Robin, rather than the traditional, and in her opinion degrading, title of Madam.

She died after being run over by the driver of a wagon on Kensington High Street in London at the age of 55.

== In film ==
The character of Gabriella in the cult-classic Mad Dog Time is based on Robin.
